= Municipalities of South Tyrol =

Autonomous province

This is a list of municipalities (Gemeinden/comuni) of the autonomous province of Bolzano - South Tyrol in the autonomous region of Trentino-Alto Adige/Südtirol in Italy. Both German and Italian are official languages in this province. Some municipalities have a third official language, Ladin.

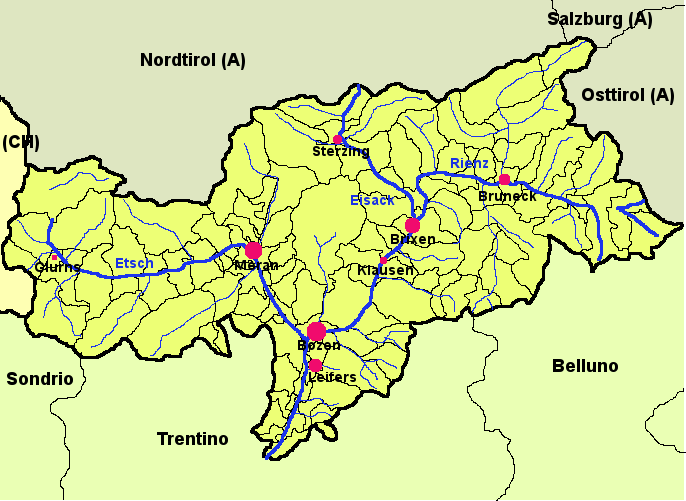
Map of South Tyrol

== List ==
Italian name	German name	Ladin name	Population (2026)	Area (km²)	Density
Aldino	Aldein		1,609	62.69	25.7
Andriano	Andrian		1,058	4.89	216.4
Anterivo	Altrei		388	11.06	35.1
Appiano sulla Strada del Vino	Eppan an der Weinstraße		15,062	59.45	253.4
Avelengo	Hafling		823	27.40	30.0
Badia	Abtei	Badia	3,589	83.18	43.1
Barbian	Barbian	Perbian	1,788	24.51	72.9
Bolzano	Bozen	Balsan, Bulsan	106,901	52.29	2,044.4
Braies	Prags	Braies	690	90.25	7.6
Brennero	Brenner	Prëner	2,434	114.29	21.3
Bressanone	Brixen	Persenon, Porsenù	23,350	84.70	275.7
Bronzolo	Branzoll		2,824	7.54	374.5
Brunico	Bruneck	Bornech, Burnech	17,166	45.00	381.5
Caines	Kuens		386	1.63	236.8
Caldaro sulla Strada del Vino	Kaltern an der Weinstraße		8,301	48.04	172.8
Campo di Trens	Freienfeld		2,811	95.39	29.5
Campo Tures	Sand in Taufers		5,877	163.98	35.8
Castelbello-Ciardes	Kastelbell-Tschars		2,418	11.10	217.8
Castelrotto	Kastelruth	Ciastel	7,062	117.90	59.9
Cermes	Tscherms		1,653	6.62	249.7
Chienes	Kiens		3,067	33.68	91.1
Chiusa	Klausen	Tluses, Tlüses	5,225	51.29	101.9
Cornedo all'Isarco	Karneid		3,447	40.61	84.9
Cortaccia sulla Strada del Vino	Kurtatsch an der Weinstraße		2,238	29.27	76.5
Cortina sulla Strada del Vino	Kurtinig an der Weinstraße		676	2.00	338.0
Corvara in Badia	Corvara	Corvara	1,438	38.92	36.9
Curon Venosta	Graun im Vinschgau		2,398	209.65	11.4
Dobbiaco	Toblach		3,492	125.42	27.8
Egna	Neumarkt		5,518	23.57	234.1
Falzes	Pfalzen	Falzes	3,192	33.13	96.3
Fiè allo Sciliar	Völs am Schlern	Fíe, Fië	3,747	43.96	85.2
Fortezza	Franzensfeste		1,139	61.77	18.4
Funes	Villnöß	Funès	2,550	81.38	31.3
Gais	Gais		3,283	60.62	54.2
Gargazzone	Gargazon		1,790	4.91	364.6
Glorenza	Glurns		937	13.22	70.9
La Valle	Wengen	La Val	1,419	13.89	102.2
Laces	Latsch		5,279	38.92	135.6
Lagundo	Algund		5,075	78.71	64.5
Laion	Lajen	Laion, Laiun	2,833	23.68	119.6
Laives	Leifers		18,681	24.11	774.8
Lana	Lana		12,745	36.12	352.9
Lasa	Laas		4,182	36.12	115.8
Lauregno	Laurein		316	110.23	2.9
Luson	Lüsen	Lujon, Lijun	1,579	74.41	21.2
Magrè sulla Strada del Vino	Margreid an der Weinstraße		1,312	13.86	94.7
Malles Venosta	Mals		5,246	247.43	21.2
Marebbe	Enneberg	Mareo	3,221	160.32	20.1
Marlengo	Marling		2,910	12.86	226.3
Martello	Martell		840	142.80	5.9
Meltina	Mölten		1,724	36.95	46.7
Merano	Meran	Maran	41,658	26.34	1,581.5
Monguelfo-Tesido	Welsberg-Taisten		2,904	46.44	62.5
Montagna sulla Strada del Vino	Montan		1,766	19.51	90.5
Moso in Passiria	Moos in Passeier		2,029	193.53	10.5
Nalles	Nals		2,111	12.24	172.5
Naturno	Naturns		6,101	67.11	90.9
Naz-Sciaves	Natz-Schabs		3,522	15.96	220.7
Nova Levante	Welschnofen	Nueva Ladina, Nöia Ladina	2,110	51.10	41.3
Nova Ponente	Deutschnofen		4,148	112.49	36.9
Ora	Auer		3,932	11.79	333.5
Ortisei	St. Ulrich in Gröden	Urtijëi	4,710	24.16	195.0
Parcines	Partschins		3,973	55.40	71.7
Perca	Percha		1,768	30.36	58.2
Plaus	Plaus		760	4.87	156.1
Ponte Gardena	Waidbruck	Pruca	271	2.33	116.3
Postal	Burgstall		2,057	6.69	307.5
Prato allo Stelvio	Prad am Stilfser Joch		3,866	51.00	75.8
Predoi	Prettau		508	86.36	5.9
Proves	Proveis		243	18.37	13.2
Racines	Ratschings		4,702	203.29	23.1
Rasun-Anterselva	Rasen-Antholz		2,936	121.57	24.2
Renon	Ritten	Renon	8,332	111.36	74.8
Rifiano	Riffian		1,393	35.94	38.8
Rio di Pusteria	Mühlbach		3,330	83.82	39.7
Rodengo	Rodeneck	Redant	1,304	29.62	44.0
Salorno	Salurn an der Weinstraße		3,835	33.13	115.8
San Candido	Innichen	Sanciana	3,318	79.85	41.6
San Genesio Atesino	Jenesien		3,026	68.84	44.0
San Leonardo in Passiria	St. Leonhard in Passeier		3,680	89.03	41.3
San Lorenzo di Sebato	St. Lorenzen	San Laurënz	3,993	51.46	77.6
San Martino in Badia	St. Martin in Thurn	San Martin de Tor	1,794	75.94	23.6
San Martino in Passiria	St. Martin in Passeier		3,323	29.99	110.8
San Pancrazio	St. Pankraz		1,548	63.17	24.5
Santa Cristina Valgardena	St. Christina in Gröden	Santa Cristina Gherdëina	2,036	31.92	63.8
Sarentino	Sarntal		7,282	302.27	24.1
Scena	Schenna		3,069	48.13	63.8
Selva dei Molini	Mühlwald		1,367	104.79	13.0
Selva di Val Gardena	Wolkenstein in Gröden	Sëlva	2,630	56.24	46.8
Senale-San Felice	Unsere Liebe Frau im Walde-St. Felix		814	27.63	29.5
Senales	Schnals		1,234	209.84	5.9
Sesto	Sexten	Sest, Le Sest	1,799	80.42	22.4
Silandro	Schlanders		6,408	115.17	55.6
Sluderno	Schluderns		1,894	20.72	91.4
Stelvio	Stilfs		1,179	141.63	8.3
Terento	Terenten		1,837	42.16	43.6
Terlano	Terlan		5,017	18.57	270.2
Termeno sulla Strada del Vino	Tramin an der Weinstraße		3,393	19.44	174.5
Tesimo	Tisens		2,083	38.13	54.6
Tires	Tiers	Tires	1,036	42.18	24.6
Tirolo	Tirol		2,493	25.62	97.3
Trodena nel parco naturale	Truden im Naturpark		1,068	20.56	51.9
Tubre	Taufers im Münstertal		961	46.27	20.8
Ultimo	Ulten		2,921	208.12	14.0
Vadena	Pfatten		1,097	13.74	79.8
Val di Vizze	Pfitsch		3,107	142.12	21.9
Valdaora	Olang	Valdaura, Valdaora	3,276	49.08	66.7
Valle Aurina	Ahrntal		6,016	187.89	32.0
Valle di Casies	Gsies		2,356	110.14	21.4
Vandoies	Vintl	Vandoies	3,384	110.82	30.5
Varna	Vahrn		5,104	70.34	72.6
Velturno	Feldthurns		3,101	24.58	126.2
Verano	Vöran		1,013	22.01	46.0
Villabassa	Niederdorf		1,607	18.03	89.1
Villandro	Villanders	Olaneres	1,872	43.95	42.6
Vipiteno	Sterzing		7,040	32.97	213.5

== See also ==
- List of municipalities of Trentino-Alto Adige/Südtirol
- List of municipalities of Italy
- Prontuario dei nomi locali dell'Alto Adige
- Municipalities of Trentino
