= South Tyrolean Unterland =

Region in South Tyrol, Italy

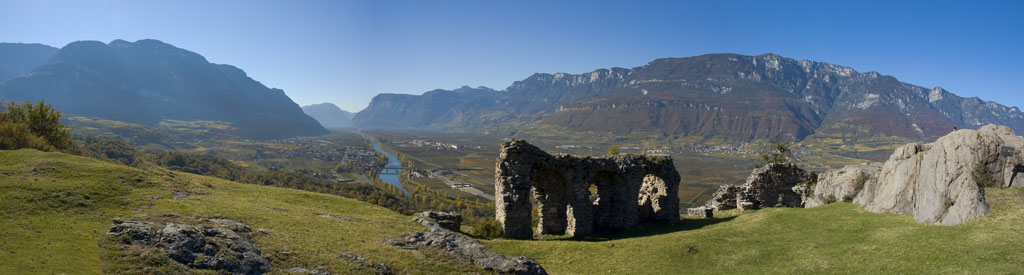
Adige valley and Tramin, view from Castelfeder hill

The South Tyrolean Unterland (German: Südtiroler Unterland) or Bozen Unterland (Bozner Unterland; Italian: Bassa Atesina) is a section of the Etschtal valley stretching from the regional capital Bolzano (Bozen) down the Adige (Etsch) river to Tramin and Salorno (Salurn). The area is known for its history, particularly regarding Rhaetic, Roman, and Germanic archaeological sites; its bilingualism (German and Italian), and its viticulture; the Gewürztraminer grape originated here.

The region should not be confused with the Tyrolean Unterland in the Austrian state of Tyrol.

== Geography ==
The Adige valley between the Fiemme Mountains in the east and the Nonsberg Group in the west is part of an important north–south transport route, traversed by the Brenner Autobahn (Autostrada A22, part of the European route E45) and the Brenner Railway line from Innsbruck to Verona.

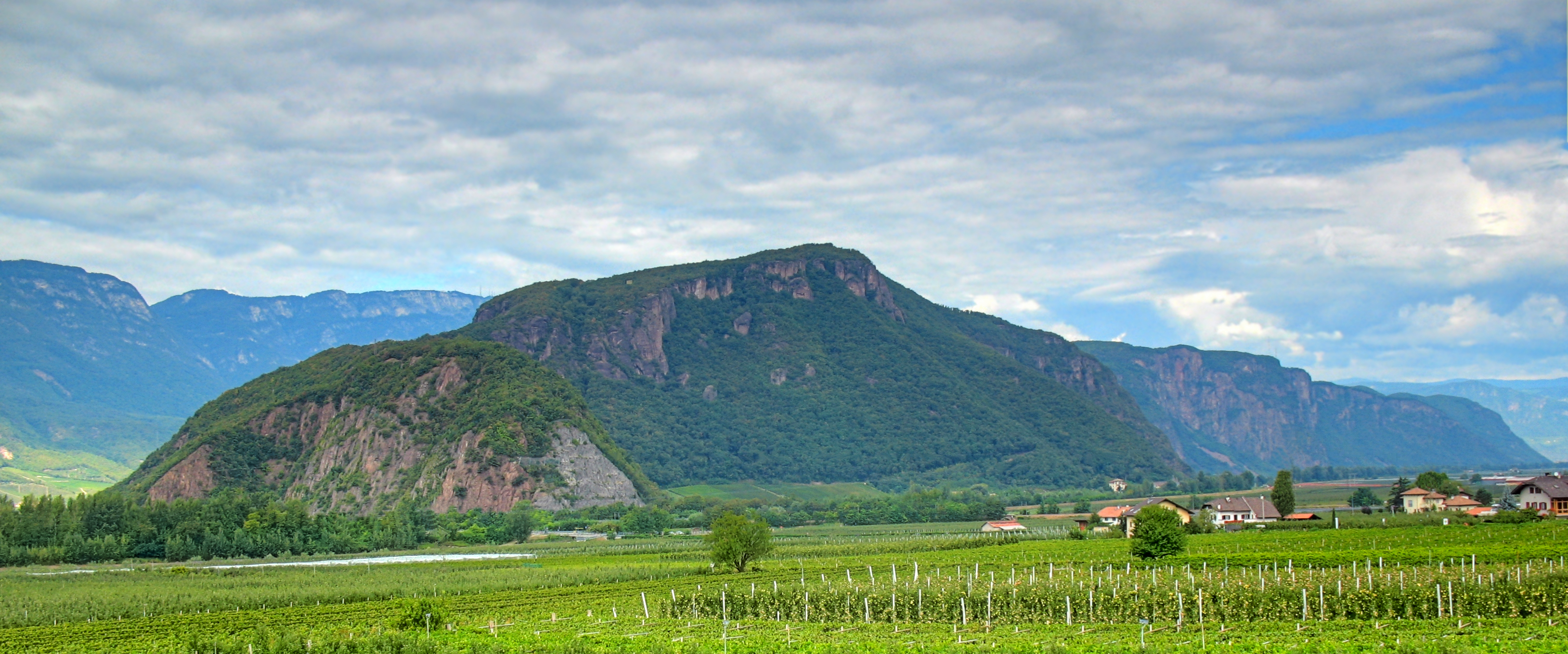
Mitterberg seen from Auer

The South Tyrolean Unterland comprises the valley municipalities of Auer, Bronzolo, Kurtatsch, Kurtinig, Laives, Margreid, Montan, Neumarkt, Salorno, Tramin, and Vadena as well as the mountain communities of Aldein, Altrei in the Fiemme Valley, and Truden. Neumarkt usually rates as the chief town of the Unterland area, though the largest settlement is Laives (Leifers). The adjacent municipalities of Eppan and Kaltern in the west, beyond the Mitterberg massif, form the separate Überetsch area. Both are part of the South Tyrolean Überetsch-Unterland district.

== History ==
After the fall of the Roman Empire and the Migration Period, the Adige valley south of Bolzano was gradually settled by Bavarian peasants from the 6th century onwards. By 800 AD, the border region with the Italian Duchy of Tridentum was incorporated in the Carolingian duchy of Bavaria, which itself formed a constituent stem duchy of the German kingdom and of the Holy Roman Empire from 962 onwards. In the 12th and 13th century, the Counts of Tyrol continued to expand their dominant possession in the region and finally achieved independence from the Bavarian dukes as well as from the prince-bishops of Trent and Brixen. In 1363 the Tyrolean lands fell to the Austrian House of Habsburg.

The Unterland area remained a transition zone between the German and Italian lands for centuries. A distinct language border did not develop until early modern times; during rising 19th century nationalism it was consolidated at the Adige narrow south of Salorno (Salurner Klause, Chiusa di Salorno). When after World War I the Tyrolean lands up to Brenner Pass fell to the Kingdom of Italy according to the 1915 Treaty of London, the Italian authorities shifted the border northwards and from 1921 the entire Unterland area up to Bronzolo belonged to the Trentino province. The Fascist regime in Italy decided to force the so-called mixed-language regions to be Italianised while German South Tyroleans insisted on the Salorno border (see Bozner Bergsteigerlied).

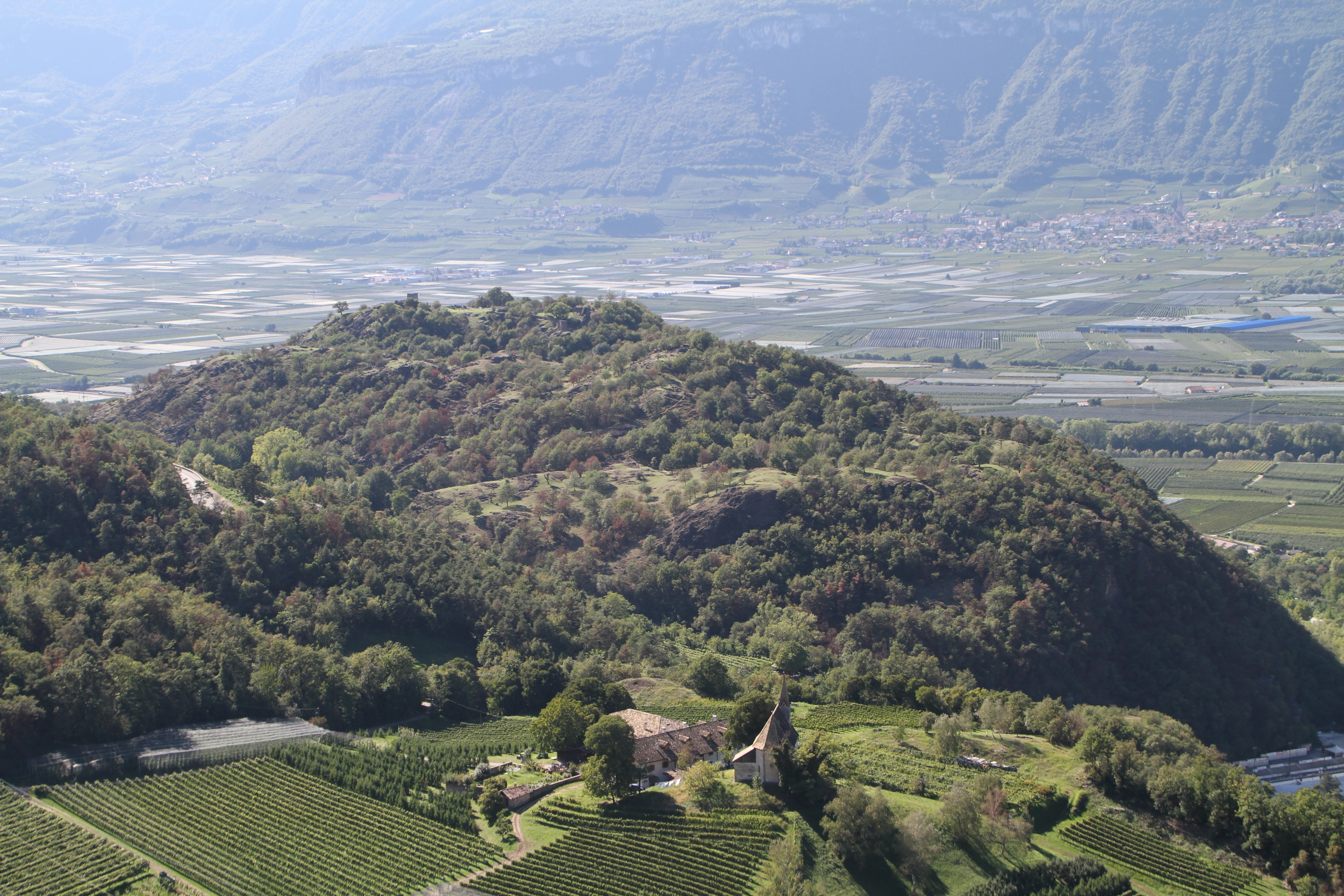
Castelfeder hill and Adige valley

After the war, German-speaking activists again demanded the return of the Unterland to the South Tyrol province. On 30 May 1946 a large protest rally on the Castelfeder hill near Neumarkt was organised by the newly established South Tyrolean People's Party (SVP). By the First Statute of Autonomy of South Tyrol in 1948, the Unterland was finally affiliated with the Bolzano province. Since 1975, the area is part of the South Tyrolean Überetsch-Unterland district.

== Sources ==
- Südtiroler Kulturinstitut (publ.): Das Südtiroler Unterland, Bozen: Athesia 1980.
- Erich Egg: Kunst im Südtiroler Unterland, Bozen ²1991.

== See also ==
- Vinschgau
- Baron Longo estate
