= List of renamed municipalities in Italy =

The following is a list of settlements in Italy whose name was changed between 1861 and today, sorted by region. This list contains only settlements within the present-day borders of Italy, but omits the German place names in South Tyrol (see Prontuario dei nomi locali dell'Alto Adige and Italianization of South Tyrol) and the italianized versions of the French place names in Aosta Valley.

== Abruzzo ==
Former name	New name	Date
Bacucco	Arsita	1905

== Aosta Valley ==
Former name	New name	Date
Allain	Allein	1976
Arnaz	Arnad	1976
Donnaz	Donnas	1976
Pont Bozet	Pontboset	1976
Valgrisanche	Valgrisenche	1976
Valsavaranche	Valsavarenche	1976
Valtournanche	Valtournenche	1976
Saint Rhémy	Saint-Rhémy-en-Bosses	1991

== Apulia ==
Former name	New name	Date
Saline di Barletta	Margherita di Savoia	1879

== Basilicata ==
Former name	New name	Date
Salvia	Savoia di Lucania	1878
Montepeloso	Irsina	1895

== Calabria ==
Former name	New name	Date
Cotrone	Crotone	1928
Monteleone	Vibo Valentia	1928
Casino	Castelsilano	1950

== Campania ==
Former name	New name	Date
Santa Maria Maggiore	Santa Maria Capua Vetere	1861
Capriati	Capriati a Volturno	1862
Mirabella	Mirabella Eclano	1862
Orta	Orta di Atella	1862
San Cipriano	San Cipriano d'Aversa	1862
San Felice	San Felice a Cancello	1862
Vietri	Vietri sul Mare	1862
Volturara	Volturara Irpina	1862
Ajello	Aiello del Sabato	1863
Barano	Barano d'Ischia	1863
Capriglia	Capriglia Irpina	1863
Castelvetere	Castelvetere in Val Fortore	1863
Mojo	Moio della Civitella	1863
Sala di Gioi	Salento	1863
Tocco	Tocco Caudio	1863
Valle di Prata	Valle Agricola	1863
Sant'Arcangelo	Sant'Arcangelo Trimonte	1864
Sessa	Sessa Aurunca	1864
San Martino Ave Gratia Plena	San Martino Sannita	1872
Piaggine Sottane	Valle dell'Angelo	1873
Vitulaccio	Vitulazio	1882
Santa Croce di Morcone	Santa Croce del Sannio	1883
Pomigliano di Atella	Frattaminore	1890
Melito Valle Bonito	Melito Irpino	1923
Vico di Pantano	Villa Literno	1927
Sicignano	Sicignano degli Alburni	1928
San Giorgio La Montagna	San Giorgio del Sannio	1929
Ariano di Puglia	Ariano Irpino	1930
Ortodonico	Montecorice	1930
Ottaiano	Ottaviano	1933
Morra Irpino	Morra De Sanctis	1934
San Severino Rota	Mercato San Severino	1945
Pescolamazza	Pesco Sannita	1947
Trentola	Trentola-Ducenta	1949
Frignano Piccolo	Villa di Briano	1950
Frignano Maggiore	Frignano	1952
Casamicciola	Casamicciola Terme	1956
Piedimonte d'Alife	Piedimonte Matese	1970
Contursi	Contursi Terme	1974
Piana di Caiazzo	Piana di Monte Verna	1976
Telese	Telese Terme	1992
Capaccio	Capaccio Paestum	2016

== Emilia-Romagna ==
Original name	New name	Year
Albareto	Albareto di Borgotaro	1862
Bagnolo	Bagnolo in Piano	1862
Calderara	Calderara di Reno	1862
Campagnola	Campagnola Emilia	1862
Castel San Pietro	Castel San Pietro Dell'Emilia	1862
Serravalle	Castello di Serravalle	1862
Castelvetro	Castelvetro di Modena	1862
Castelvetro	Castelvetro Piacentino	1862
Civitella	Civitella di Romagna	1862
Fiorano	Fiorano Modenese	1862
Fornovo	Fornovo di Taro	1862
Gragnano	Gragnano Trebbiense	1862
Belvedere	Lizzano in Belvedere	1862
Lugagnano	Lugagnano Val d'Arda	1862
Marano	Marano sul Panaro	1862
Misano	Misano in Villa Vittoria	1862
Montescudolo	Montescudo	1862
Novi	Novi di Modena	1862
Ozzano	Ozzano dell'Emilia	1862
Pellegrino	Pellegrino Parmense	1862
Piano	Pian del Voglio	1862
Pianello	Pianello Val Tidone	1862
Polignano	Polignano Piacentino	1862
Pomaro	Pomaro Piacentino	1862
Prignano	Prignano sulla Secchia	1862
Reggio	Reggio nell'Emilia	1862
Rivalta	Rivalta Trebbia	1862
Sala	Sala Bolognese	1862
San Cesario	San Cesario sul Panaro	1862
San Donato	San Donato d'Enza	1862
San Felice	San Felice sul Panaro	1862
San Giorgio	San Giorgio Piacentino	1862
San Lazzaro	San Lazzaro Alberoni	1862
San Lazzaro	San Lazzaro di Savena	1862
San Mauro	San Mauro di Roma	1862
San Pancrazio	San Pancrazio Parmense	1862
San Polo	San Polo d'Enza in Caviano	1862
San Secondo	San Secondo Parmense	1862
Sant'Agata	Sant'Agata Bolognese	1862
Sant'Antonio	Sant'Antonio a Trebbia	1862
Sant'Ilario	Sant'Ilario d'Enza	1862
Savignano	Savignano di Romagna	1862
Savignano	Savignano sul Panaro	1862
Sogliano	Sogliano al Rubicone	1862
Tavernola	Tavernola Reno	1862
Vezzano	Vezzano sul Crostolo	1862
Villanova	Villanova sull'Arda	1862
Bagnaja	Bagnara di Romagna	1863
Castelfranco	Castelfranco dell'Emilia	1863
Argile	Castello d'Argile	1863
Castiglione	Castiglione dei Pepoli	1863
Concordia	Concordia sulla Secchia	1863
Finale	Finale Nell'Emilia	1863
Fontana	Fontana Elice	1863
Montecchio	Montecchio Emilia	1863
Montefiore	Montefiorito	1863
Monticelli	Monticelli d'Ongina	1863
Pavullo	Pavullo nel Frignano	1863
Sala	Sala Baganza	1863
San Mauro di Roma	San Mauro di Romagna	1863
Sant'Agata	Sant'Agata sul Santerno	1863
Sant'Arcangelo	Sant'Arcangelo di Romagna	1863
Tizzano	Tizzano Val Parma	1863
Anzola	Anzola dell'Emilia	1864
Rio	Rio Saliceto	1864
Morciano	Morciano di Romagna	1865
Fiorenzuola	Fiorenzuola d'Arda	1866
Polesine	Polesine Parmense	1869
Culagna	Collagna	1872
Ciano	Ciano d'Enza	1873
Pieve San Vincenzo	Ramiseto	1873
Viadagola	Granarolo dell'Emilia	1875
Castel Guelfo	Castel Guelfo di Bologna	1876
Pomaro Piacentino	Piozzano	1877
Bettola	Borgonure	1881
Porretta	Bagni della Porretta	1882
Tavernola Reno	Grizzana	1882
Caprara Sopra Panico	Marzabotto	1882
Polignano Piacentino	San Pietro in Cerro	1882
Migliaro	Migliarino	1883
Santa Maria in Duno	Bentivoglio	1885
Borgonure	Bettola	1885
Rivalta Trebbia	Gazzola	1888
Vicomarino	Ziano	1888
Casio e Casola	Castel di Casio	1896
Lesignano di Palmia	Terenzo	1897
Fontana Elice	Fontanelice	1911
Le Venezie	Jolanda di Savoia	1911
San Giovanni in Persiceto	Persiceto	1912
Sant'Arcangelo di Romagna	Santarcangelo di Romagna	1913
Riolo	Riolo dei Bagni	1915
Montefiorito	Montefiore Conca	1917
Pian del Voglio	San Benedetto Val di Sambro	1924
Terra del Sole e Castrocaro	Castrocaro e Terra del Sole	1925
Borgo San Donnino	Fidenza	1927
Predappio	Predappio Nuova	1927
Borgo Taro	Borgo Val di Taro	1928
Persiceto	San Giovanni in Persiceto	1928
Ziano	Ziano Piacentino	1928
Carpaneto	Carpaneto Piacentino	1929
Bagni della Porretta	Porretta Terme	1931
Metti e Pozzolo	Bore	1932
San Mauro di Romagna	San Mauro Pascoli	1932
Savignano di Romagna	Savignano sul Rubicone	1933
Monchio	Monchio delle Corti	1935
Praduro e Sasso	Sasso Bolognese	1935
Predappio Nuova	Predappio	1936
Misano in Villa Vittoria	Misano Adriatico	1938
Sasso Bolognese	Sasso Marconi	1938
Scorticata	Torriana	1938
Castelfranco dell'Emilia	Castelfranco Emilia	1940
Finale Nell'Emilia	Finale Emilia	1940
Monfestino in Serra Mazzoni	Serramazzoni	1948
Tossignano	Borgo Tossignano	1954
San Polo d'Enza in Caviano	San Polo d'Enza	1955
Salsomaggiore	Salsomaggiore Terme	1956
Riolo dei Bagni	Riolo Terme	1957
Castel San Pietro Dell'Emilia	Castel San Pietro Terme	1959
Castrocaro e Terra del Sole	Castrocaro Terme e Terra del Sole	1962
Farini d'Olmo	Farini	1980
Grizzana	Grizzana Morandi	1985
Ciano d'Enza	Canossa	1991

== Friuli-Venezia Giulia ==
Former name	New name	Date
Azzano	Azzano Decimo	1867
Bagnaria	Bagnaria Arsa	1867
Cosarza	Casarsa della Delizia	1867
Castelnovo	Castelnovo del Friuli	1867
Cavasso	Cavasso Nuovo	1867
Cavazzo	Cavazzo Carnico	1867
Chiusa	Chiusaforte	1867
Cividale	Cividale del Friuli	1867
Collalto	Collalto della Soima	1867
Feletto	Feletto Umberto	1867
Magnano	Magnano in Riviera	1867
Marano	Marano Lacunare	1867
Montereale	Montereale Cellina	1867
Morsano	Morsano al Tagliamento	1867
Muzzana	Muzzana del Turgnano	1867
Pavia	Pavia di Udine	1867
Pinzano	Pinzano al Tagliamento	1867
Pozzuolo	Pozzuolo del Friuli	1867
Prata	Prata di Pordenone	1867
Prato	Prato Carnico	1867
Reana	Reana del Rojale	1867
Passariano	Rivolto	1867
Roveredo	Roveredo in Piano	1867
San Daniele	San Daniele del Friuli	1867
San Martino	San Martino al Tagliamento	1867
Sesto	Sesto al Reghena	1867
Trivignano	Trivignano Udinese	1867
Villa	Villa Santina	1867
Collalto della Soima	Segnacco	1878
Fiume	Fiume Veneto	1911
Nabresina	Aurisina	1923
Pasian Schiavonesco	Basiliano	1923
Campolongo	Campolongo al Torre	1923
Camporosso	Camporosso in Valcanale	1923
Capriva	Capriva di Cormons	1923
Cervignano	Cervignano del Friuli	1923
Doberdò	Doberdò del Lago	1923
Dolegna	Dolegna del Collio	1923
Farra	Farra d'Isonzo	1923
Fogliano	Fogliano di Monfalcone	1923
Roccalba	Fusine in Valromana	1923
Gradisca	Gradisca d'Isonzo	1923
San Leopoldo Alaglesie	Laglesie San Leopoldo	1923
Manchinie	Malchina	1923
Mariano	Mariano del Friuli	1923
Podgora	Piedimonte del Calvario	1923
Pontefella	Pontebba Nova	1923
Ronchi	Ronchi di Monfalcone	1923
Repno	Rupingrande	1923
San Canziano	San Canzian d'Isonzo	1923
Dolina	San Dorligo della Valle	1923
San Floriano	San Floriano del Collio	1923
San Pietro dell'Isonzo	San Pier d'Isonzo	1923
Sant'Andrea	Sant'Andrea di Gorizia	1923
Savogna	Savogna d'Isonzo	1923
Slivno	Slivia	1923
Ucovizza	Ugovizza Valbruna	1923
Ronchi di Monfalcone	Ronchi dei Legionari	1925
San Giovanni di Manzano	San Giovanni al Natisone	1928
Fogliano di Monfalcone	Fogliano Redipuglia	1929
Rupingrande	Monrupino	1932
Gemona	Gemona del Friuli	1935
Forgaria	Forgaria nel Friuli	1937
Meretto di Tomba	Mereto di Tomba	1940
Camino di Codroipo	Camino al Tagliamento	1949
Capriva di Cormons	Capriva del Friuli	1954
Montereale Cellina	Montereale Valcellina	1955
Arta	Arta Terme	1965
San Lorenzo di Mossa	San Lorenzo Isontino	1968

== Lazio ==
Former name	New name	Date
Toscanella	Tuscania	1911
Leprignano	Capena	1933
Corneto	Tarquinia	1934
Littoria	Latina	1946

== Liguria ==
Former name	New name	Date
Castelfranco	Castel Vittorio	1862
Ortonovo	Luni	2017

== Lombardy ==
Former name	New name	Date
Cazzone	Cantello	1924
Turano	Valvestino	1931
Corteno	Corteno Golgi	1956
Polpenazze	Polpenazze del Garda	1967
Lonato	Lonato del Garda	2007
Rivanazzano	Rivanazzano Terme	2009
Godiasco	Godiasco Salice Terme	2012
Tremosine	Tremosine sul Garda	2013
Sermide	Sermide e Felonica	2017
San Giorgio di Mantova	San Giorgio Bigarello	2019

== Marche ==
Former name	New name	Date
Pausula	Corridonia	1931

== Molise ==
Former name	New name	Date
Castelluccioacquaborrana	Castelmauro	1885
Ripalta sul Trigno	Mafalda	1903

== Piedmont ==
Former name	New name	Date
Fiaccone	Fraconalto	1927
Incisa Belbo	Incisa Scapaccino	1928
Grazzano Monferrato	Grazzano Badoglio	1939
Castellinaldo	Castellinaldo d'Alba	2015
Fubine	Fubine Monferrato	2017

== Sardinia ==
Former name	New name	Date
Terranova Pausania	Olbia	1939
Mussolinia di Sardegna	Arborea	1947

== Sicily ==
Former name	New name	Date
San Filippo d'Argiriò	Agira	1861
Acquaviva	Acquaviva Platani	1862
Altavilla	Altavilla Milicia	1862
Castronuovo	Castronuovo di Sicilia	1862
Piazza	Piazza Armerina	1862
Santa Caterina	Santa Caterina Villarmosa	1862
Terranova	Terranova di Sicilia	1862
Alessandria	Alessandria della Rocca	1863
Centorbi	Centuripe	1863
Chiusa	Chiusa Sclafani	1863
Lucca	Lucca Sicula	1863
Molo	Porto Empedocle	1863
Montemaggiore	Montemaggiore Belsito	1863
Palma	Palma di Montechiaro	1863
Sambuca	Sambuca Labat	1863
Sambuca	Sambuca Zabut	1863
Santa Margherita	Santa Margherita di Belice	1863
Santo Stefano	Santo Stefano Quisquina	1863
Termini	Termini Imerese	1863
Ventimiglia	Ventimiglia di Sicilia	1863
Villafranca	Villafranca Sicula	1863
Ogliastro	Santa Maria di Ogliastro	1864
Cattolica	Cattolica Eraclea	1874
Contessa	Contessa Entellina	1875
San Giovanni di Cammarata	San Giovanni Gemini	1879
Solanto	Santa Flavia	1880
Chiaramonte	Chiaramonte Gulfi	1881
Santa Maria di Ogliastro	Bolognetta	1882
Sambuca Zabut	Sambuca di Sicilia	1923
Bauso	Villafranca Tirrena	1924
Terranova	Gela	1928
Girgenti	Agrigento	1928
Castrogiovanni	Enna	1928
Adernò	Adrano	1929
Monte San Giuliano	Erice	1934
Spaccaforno	Ispica	1935
Biscari	Acate	1938
Piana dei Greci	Piana degli Albanesi	1941
Resina	Ercolano	1969

== Trentino-South Tyrol ==
Original name	New name	Year
Aveligna	Avelengo	1923
Castello di Pusteria	Casteldarne	1923
Acernes	Cermes	1923
Zedes	Ceves	1923
Chiusa all'Isarco	Chiusa	1923
Ciars	Ciardes	1923
Colderano	Coldrano	1923
Carnedo	Cornedo	1923
Corte in Pusteria	Corti in Pusteria	1923
Cavolano	Covelano	1923
Corona Alla Muta	Curon	1923
Fundoles	Fundres	1923
Gries di Bolzano	Gries	1923
Villa in Selva	Grimaldo	1923
Cissigo	Issengo	1923
Lacigno	Lacinigo	1923
Malles	Mallas	1923
Montale in Pusteria	Mantana	1923
Maranza in Pusteria	Maranza	1923
Mezzaselva all'Isarco	Mezzaselva	1923
Monghezzo Esterno	Monghezzo di Fuori	1923
Montassilo	Montassilone	1923
Monte a Mezzodì	Monte di Mezzodì	1923
Monte a Tramontana	Monte di Tramontana	1923
Piano in Passiria	Moso	1923
Noci	Naz	1923
Perga	Perca	1923
Plagnolo	Planol	1923
Platea	Plata	1923
Palus	Plaus	1923
San Valentino in Predoi	Predoi	1923
Curaces	Quarazze	1923
Racignes	Racines	1923
Resia all'Adige	Resia	1923
Rinna	Rina	1923
Raissa	Riscone	1923
Riva in Valle	Riva di Tures	1923
San Giacomo in Valle Aurina	San Giacomo	1923
San Giorgio in Val Tures	San Giorgio	1923
San Giovanni in Valle Aurina	San Giovanni	1923
San Leonardo in Passiria	San Leonardo	1923
San Lorenzo in Pusteria	San Lorenzo	1923
San Martino in Badia	San Martino in Badia	1923
San Martino in Passiria	San Martino	1923
San Pietro in Valle Aurina	San Pietro	1923
San Valentino alla Muta	San Valentino alla Mutta	1923
Santa Cristina in Gardena	Santa Cristina	1923
Scale	Scaleres	1923
Scaves	Sciaves	1923
Selva in Gardena	Selva	1923
Senales in Venosta	Senales	1923
Sliniga	Slingia	1923
Spignes	Spinga	1923
Stave	Stava	1923
Tarres di Sopra	Tarces	1923
Tarres di Sotto	Tarres	1923
Teodona	Teodone	1923
Tisa	Tiso	1923
Velasio	Valas	1923
Valdigiovo	Valgiovo	1923
Vallelunga Carlino	Vallelunga	1923
Vezzano in Venosta	Vezzano	1923
Villa d'Uta	Villa Ottone	1923
Corvara in Badia	Ladinia	1925
Campitello	Campitello di Fassa	1926
Bondo Breguzzo	Arnò	1928
Salter Malgolo	Malgolo	1928
Pergine	Pergine Valsugana	1928
San Genesio	San Genesio Atesino	1928
San Lorenzo	San Lorenzo in Pusteria	1928
San Martino	San Martino in Badia	1928
Tione	Tione di Trento	1928
Valdagno	Valdagno di Trento	1928
Cornedo	Cornedo all'Isarco	1929
Arnò	Bondo Breguzzo	1931
Ladinia	Corvara in Badia	1938
Ponte all'Isarco	Ponte Gardena	1938
San Lorenzo in Pusteria	San Lorenzo di Sebato	1940
Mezzaselva	Fortezza	1942
Valdagno di Trento	Valdagno	1948
Fai	Fai della Paganella	1952
Prato allo Stelvio	Prato Venosta	1953
San Martino	San Martino in Passiria	1953
Prato Venosta	Prato allo Stelvio	1954
Valdagno	Aldino	1955
Baselga	Baselga di Vezzano	1955
Castello	Castel Condino	1955
Moso	Moso in Passiria	1955
Pozza	Pozza di Fassa	1955
Santa Cristina	Santa Cristina Valgardena	1955
Selva	Selva di Val Gardena	1955
Ziano	Ziano di Fiemme	1955
Calceranica	Calceranica al Lago	1957
Ronchi	Ronchi Valsugana	1957
Palù	Palù del Fersina	1959
Levico	Levico Terme	1969
Riva	Riva del Garda	1969
Appiano	Appiano sulla Strada del Vino	1971
Caldaro	Caldaro sulla Strada del Vino	1971
Cortaccia	Cortaccia sulla Strada del Vino	1971
Cortina all'Adige	Cortina sulla Strada del Vino	1971
Fiè	Fiè allo Sciliar	1971
Magrè all'Adige	Magrè sulla Strada del Vino	1971
Pannone	Ronzo-Chienis	1971
Termeno	Termeno sulla Strada del Vino	1971
Castello di Fiemme	Castello-Molina di Fiemme	1973
Sant'Orsola	Sant'Orsola Terme	1986
Garniga	Garniga Terme	1993
Monguelfo	Monguelfo-Tesido	2003
Roncegno	Roncegno Terme	2005
Ruffré	Ruffré-Mendola	2005
Caderzone	Caderzone Terme	2008
Trodena	Trodena nel parco naturale	2008
Soraga	Soraga di Fassa	2017

== Tuscany ==
Former name	New name	Date
Colonna di Buriano	Vetulonia	1887

== Umbria ==
Former name	New name	Date
Bastia	Bastia Umbra	1863
Belmonte	Belmonte in Sabina	1863
Calvi	Calvi dell'Umbria	1863
Canemorto	Orvinio	1863
Cantalupo	Cantalupo in Sabina	1863
Castelnuovo	Castelnuovo di Farfa	1863
Cerreto	Cerreto di Spoleto	1863
Fara	Fara in Sabina	1863
Fossato	Fossato di Vico	1863
Frasso	Frasso Sabino	1863
Fratta	Umbertide	1863
Fratta	Fratta Todina	1863
Giano	Giano dell'Umbria	1863
Longone di San Salvatore Maggiore	Longone Sabino	1863
Lugnano	Lugnano in Teverina	1863
Magliano	Magliano Sabina	1863
Massa	Massa Martana	1863
Montecastello	Monte Castello di Vibio	1863
Monteleone	Monteleone di Spoleto	1863
Monteleone	Monteleone Sabino	1863
Monteleone	Monteleone d'Orvieto	1863
Montenero	Montenero Sabino	1863
Montopoli	Montopoli di Sabina	1863
Morro	Morro Reatino	1863
Nocera	Nocera Umbra	1863
Penna	Penna in Teverina	1863
Sant'Anatolia	Sant'Anatolia di Narco	1863
Torri	Torri in Sabina	1863
Torricella	Torricella in Sabina	1863
Vallo	Vallo di Nera	1863
Castelvecchio	Castel di Tora	1864
Lisciano	Lisciano Niccone	1864
Varco	Varco Sabino	1873
Monte San Giovanni	Monte San Giovanni in Sabina	1882
Collalto	Collalto Sabino	1893
Pozzaglia	Pozzaglia Sabina	1911
Passignano	Passignano sul Trasimeno	1918
Tuoro	Tuoro sul Trasimeno	1922

== Veneto ==
Original name	New name	Year
Abano Bagni	Abano	1867
Alano	Alano di Piave	1867
Albaredo	Sant'Andrea di Cavasagra	1867
Albaredo	Albaredo d'Adige	1867
Altavilla	Altavilla Vicentina	1867
Annone	Annone Veneto	1867
Ariano	Ariano nel Polesine	1867
Badia	Badia Polesine	1867
Bagnoli	Bagnoli di Sopra	1867
Bagnolo	Bagnolo di Po	1867
Belfiore di Porcile	Belfiore	1867
Bolzano	Bolzano Vicentino	1867
Sant'Eufemia	Borgoricco	1867
Buso	Buso Sarzano	1867
Camisano	Camisano Vicentino	1867
Campagna	Campagna Lupia	1867
Campiglia	Campiglia dei Berici	1867
Campolongo	Campodoro	1867
Campolongo	Campolongo Maggiore	1867
Campolongo	Campolongo sul Brenta	1867
Capodimonte	Ponte nelle Alpi	1867
Cappella	Cappella Maggiore	1867
Caprino	Caprino Veronese	1867
Carmignano	Carmignano di Brenta	1867
Casale	Casale di Scodosia	1867
Castelfranco	Castelfranco Veneto	1867
Godego	Castello di Godego	1867
Castelnovo	Castelnovo Bariano	1867
Castelnuovo	Castelnuovo di Verona	1867
Cavajon	Cavaion Veronese	1867
Cazzano	Cazzano di Tramigna	1867
Cerro	Cerro Veronese	1867
Cesana	Lentiai	1867
Cesio	Cesiomaggiore	1867
Cinto	Cinto Euganeo	1867
Cinto	Cinto Caomaggiore	1867
Cison	Cison di Valmarino	1867
Colle	Colle Umberto	1867
Cologna	Cologna Veneta	1867
Colognola	Colognola ai Colli	1867
San Cascian del Meschio	Cordignano	1867
Costa	Costa di Rovigo	1867
Crespano	Crespano Veneto	1867
Danta	Danta di Cadore	1867
Farra	Farra di Soligo	1867
Fiesso	Fiesso Umbertiano	1867
Fiesso	Fiesso d'Artico	1867
Fossalta	Fossalta di Piave	1867
Fossalta	Fossalta di Portogruaro	1867
Frassinelle	Frassinelle Polesine	1867
Fratta	Fratta Polesine	1867
Galliera	Galliera Veneta	1867
Gazzo	Gazzo Veronese	1867
Godega	Godega di Sant'Urbano	1867
Grignano	Grignano di Polesine	1867
Grisignano	Grisignano di Zocco	1867
Lago	San Giorgio di Lago	1867
Lozzo	Lozzo Atestino	1867
Marano	Marano di Valpolicella	1867
Marano	Marano Vicentino	1867
Mareno	Mareno di Piave	1867
Mason	Mason Vicentino	1867
Montebello	Montebello Vicentino	1867
San Sebastiano	Monte di Malo	1867
Monteforte	Monteforte d'Alpone	1867
Montorio	Montorio Veronese	1867
Nogarole	Nogarole Rocca	1867
Nogarole	Nogarole Vicentino	1867
Noventa	Noventa Padovana	1867
Noventa	Noventa di Piave	1867
Ospedaletto	Ospedaletto Euganeo	1867
Paderno	Paderno d'Asolo	1867
Palazzolo	Palazzolo dello Stella	1867
Parona	Parona all'Adige	1867
Peschiera	Peschiera sul Lago di Garda	1867
Pettorazza	Pettorazza Grimani	1867
Piacenza	Piacenza d'Adige	1867
Piazzolo	Piazzola sul Brenta	1867
Piombino	Piombino Dese	1867
Capodimonte	Ponte nelle Alpi	1867
San Niccolò	Porto Tolle	1867
Pozzo	Pozzoleone	1867
Quinto	Quinto di Valpantena	1867
Quinto	Quinto Vicentino	1867
Quinzano	Quinzano Veronese	1867
Riva	Rivamonte	1867
Rivoli	Rivoli Veronese	1867
Rocca	Rocca di Agordo	1867
Ronco	Ronco all'Adige	1867
Rossano	Rossano Veneto	1867
Roveredo	Roveredo di Guà	1867
San Germano	San Germano dei Berici	1867
San Giorgio	San Giorgio della Richinvelda	1867
San Gregorio	San Gregorio nelle Alpi	1867
San Martino	San Martino di Venezze	1867
San Massimo	San Massimo all'Adige	1867
Saline	San Mauro di Saline	1867
San Michele	San Michele al Tagliamento	1867
San Michele	San Michele Extra	1867
San Polo	San Polo di Piave	1867
San Vito	San Vito di Cadore	1867
San Vito	San Vito di Leguzzano	1867
Montagna di Montebaldo	San Zeno di Montagna	1867
San Zenone	San Zenone degli Ezzelini	1867
Sant'Ambrogio	Sant'Ambrogio di Valpolicella	1867
Sant'Angelo	Sant'Angelo di Piove di Sacco	1867
Sant'Apollinare	Sant'Apollinare con Selva	1867
Santa Lucia	Santa Lucia di Piave	1867
Santa Margherita	Santa Margherita d'Adige	1867
Terrassa	Terrassa Padovana	1867
Torri	Torri del Benaco	1867
Valeggio	Valeggio sul Mincio	1867
Valle	Valle di Cadore	1867
Velo	Velo d'Astico	1867
Velo	Velo Veronese	1867
Vighizzolo	Vighizzolo d'Este	1867
Villabona	Villa d'Adige	1867
Villa di Villa	Villa Estense	1867
Villafranca	Villafranca di Verona	1867
Villafranca	Villafranca Padovana	1867
Villanova	Villanova di Camposampiero	1867
Vodo	Vodo Cadore	1867
Zenson	Zenson di Piave	1867
Arqua	Arquà Petrarca	1868
Arqua	Arquà Polesine	1868
Boara	Boara Pisani	1868
Breda	Breda di Piave	1868
Casale	Casale sul Sile	1868
Castione	Castione Veronese	1868
Concordia	Concordia Sagittaria	1868
Lozzo	Lozzo Cadore	1868
Lugo	Lugo di Vicenza	1868
Maserà	Maserà di Padova	1868
Mogliano	Mogliano Veneto	1868
Monastier	Monastier di Treviso	1868
Motta	Motta di Livenza	1868
Ponzano	Ponzano Veneto	1868
Quinto	Quinto di Treviso	1868
Romano	Romano d'Ezzelino	1868
San Nicolò	San Nicolò di Comelico	1868
San Pietro	San Pietro Cadore	1868
Teglio	Teglio Veneto	1868
San Pietro degli Schiavi	San Pietro al Natisone	1869
Treppo	Treppo Carnico	1869
Castelletto	Castelletto di Brenzone	1870
Caerano	Caerano di San Marco	1872
Isola Porcarizza	Isola Rizza	1872
Favaro	Favaro Veneto	1873
Pontecasale	Candiana	1878
Servo	Sovramonte	1881
Fasana di Polesine	Ca' Emo	1882
Anguillara	Anguillara Veneta	1883
Meduna	Meduna di Livenza	1884
San Pietro Engù	San Pietro in Gu	1884
Gorgo	Gorgo al Monticano	1886
Mure	Salcedo	1889
San Tiziano di Goimna	Zoldo Alto	1890
Marano Lacunare	Marano Lagunare	1893
Comelico Inferiore	Santo Stefano di Cadore	1894
Cucca	Veronella	1902
Selva Bellunese	Selva di Cadore	1903
Isola di Malo	Isola Vicentina	1905
Parona all'Adige	Parona di Valpolicella	1905
Roverè di Velo	Roverè Veronese	1908
Borso	Borso del Grappa	1920
Crespano Veneto	Crespano del Grappa	1920
Musile	Musile di Piave	1920
Paderno d'Asolo	Paderno del Grappa	1920
Cavaso	Cavaso del Tomba	1922
Ampezzo	Cortina d'Ampezzo	1923
Nervesa	Nervesa della Battaglia	1923
Vittorio	Vittorio Veneto	1923
Abano	Abano Terme	1924
Castelletto di Brenzone	Brenzone	1924
Cogollo	Cogollo del Cengio	1924
Sernaglia	Sernaglia della Battaglia	1924
Forni	Tonezza	1924
Battaglia	Battaglia Terme	1925
Maserada	Maserada sul Piave	1925
Volpago	Volpago del Montello	1925
Barbarano	Barbarano Vicentino	1926
Valli dei Signori	Valli del Pasubio	1926
Cismon	Cismon del Grappa	1927
Sant'Odorico	Flaibano	1927
Asigliano	Asigliano Veneto	1928
Bassano	Bassano del Grappa	1928
Cornedo	Cornedo Vicentino	1928
Crocetta Trevigliana	Crocetta del Montello	1928
Magrè	Magrè Vicentino	1928
Pontecchio	Pontecchio Polesine	1929
Cavazuccherina	Jesolo	1930
Peschiera sul Lago di Garda	Peschiera del Garda	1930
Vigo	Vigo di Cadore	1930
Platischis	Taipana	1931
Taglio di Porto Viro	Porto Viro	1932
Livinallongo	Livinallongo del Col di Lana	1933
Piovene	Piovene Rocchette	1933
San Pietro Montagnon	Montegrotto Terme	1934
Recoaro	Recoaro Terme	1934
Melma	Silea	1935
Tezze	Tezze sul Brenta	1939
Lorenzago	Lorenzago di Cadore	1940
Borca	Borca di Cadore	1941
Casal Ser Ugo	Casalserugo	1941
San Michele del Quarto	Quarto d'Altino	1946
Ospitale	Ospitale di Cadore	1949
Pove	Pove del Grappa	1950
Grisolera	Eraclea	1951
Riese	Riese Pio X	1952
Perarolo	Perarolo di Cadore	1955
Seren	Seren del Grappa	1955
Zoppè	Zoppè di Cadore	1955
Domegge	Domegge di Cadore	1957
Lozzo Cadore	Lozzo di Cadore	1957
San Pietro Cadore	San Pietro di Cadore	1957
Calalzo	Calalzo di Cadore	1959
Tonezza	Tonezza del Cimone	1959
Auronzo	Auronzo di Cadore	1961
Moriago	Moriago della Battaglia	1962
Forno di Canale	Canale d'Agordo	1964
Cencenighe	Cencenighe Agordino	1964
La Valle	La Valle Agordina	1964
Rivamonte	Rivamonte Agordino	1964
Rocca di Agordo	Rocca Pietore	1964
San Tomaso	San Tomaso Agordino	1964
Taibon	Taibon Agordino	1964
Vallada	Vallada Agordina	1964
Voltago	Voltago Agordino	1964
Concordia Sagitaria	Concordia Sagittaria	1965
Cibiana	Cibiana di Cadore	1968
Castelnuovo di Verona	Castelnuovo del Garda	1970
Galzignano	Galzignano Terme	1979
Brenzone	Brenzone sul Garda	2014
Costermano	Costermano sul Garda	2016

== Uncategorised ==
Most Italian cities have historical Latin names, and some have Greek or Etruscan names.

- Maleventum → Beneventum → Benevento
- Ζάγκλη Zankle (Zancle Dankle) → Μεσσήνη Messene → Μεσσάνα Messana → Messina
