= Ulten =

- Comune
- Gemeinde Ulten; Comune di Ultimo
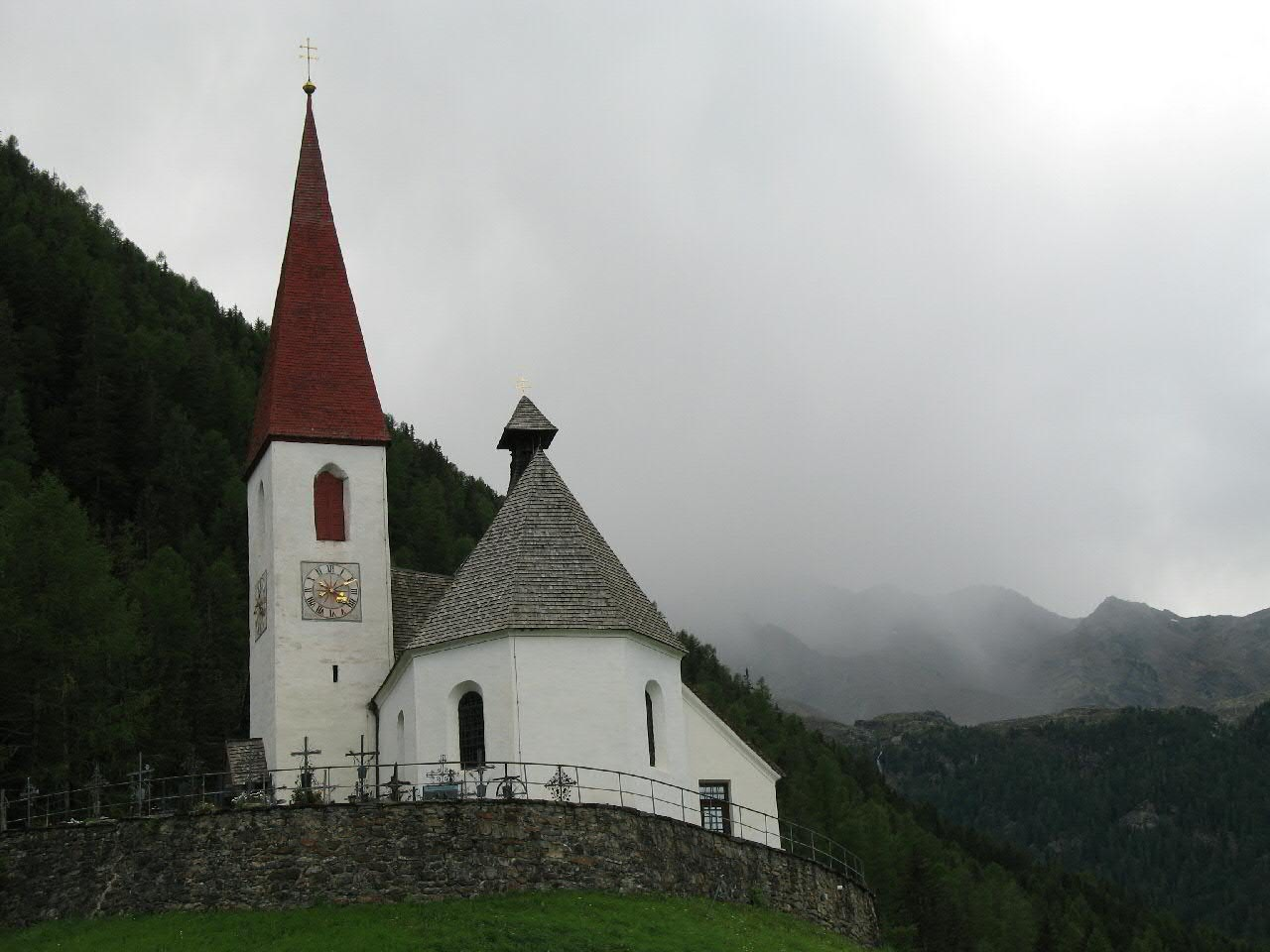
- Church of St. Gertrud in Ulten

- Location within Italy Location within Trentino-Alto Adige/Südtirol
- Coordinates: 46°33′N 10°52′E
- Country: Italy
- Region: Trentino-Alto Adige/Südtirol
- Province: South Tyrol (BZ)
- Frazioni: St. Gertraud (San Gertrude), St. Nikolaus (San Nicolò), St. Walburg (Santa Valburga)

Government
  - Mayor: Stefan Schwarz (SVP)

Area
  - Total: 208.8 km^{2} (80.6 sq mi)
- Elevation: 1,190 m (3,900 ft)

Population (Nov. 2010)
  - Total: 2,934
  - Density: 14.05/km^{2} (36.39/sq mi)
- Demonym(s): German: Ultner; Italian: della val d'Ultimo
- Time zone: UTC+1 (CET)
  - Summer (DST): UTC+2 (CEST)
- Postal code: 39016
- Dialing code: 0473
- Website: Official website

Ulten (German pronunciation: [ˈʊltn̩]; Italian: Ultimo [ˈultimo]) is a comune (municipality) in South Tyrol in northern Italy, located about 35 kilometres (22 mi) west of Bolzano.

== History ==
=== Coat-of-arms ===
The shield is party per pale of argent; the first part shows half Tyrolean eagle; the second part is tierced per fess of sable and argent. It is the arms of the Counts of Eschenlch and the Tyrolean eagle represents the membership to the Tirol. The emblem was granted in 1967.

== Demographics ==
=== Linguistic distribution ===
According to the 2024 census, 99.09% of the population speak German, 0.84% Italian and 0.07% Ladin as first language.

=== Demographic evolution ===
Historical population

Year	Pop.	±%
1860	?	—
1870	?	—
1880	3,504	—
1900	?	—
1910	2,122	—

Year	Pop.	±%
1921	2,118	−0.2%
1931	2,310	+9.1%
1936	2,330	+0.9%
1951	2,612	+12.1%
1961	3,043	+16.5%

Year	Pop.	±%
1971	3,070	+0.9%
1981	3,036	−1.1%
1991	2,945	−3.0%
2001	3,006	+2.1%
2011	2,920	−2.9%

Source: Data from ISTAT

- note: in 1897 the largest village of Ulten St. Pankraz became a Gemeinde on its own.
