= Pannone =

Pannone is a surname. Notable people with the surname include:

- Gianfranco Pannone, Italian film director
- Ryan Pannone (born 1985), American basketball coach
- Thomas Pannone (born 1994), American baseball player

== See also ==
- Pannone solicitors, law firm based in the UK
