= Italianization of South Tyrol =

1920s–1940s Italian government policy

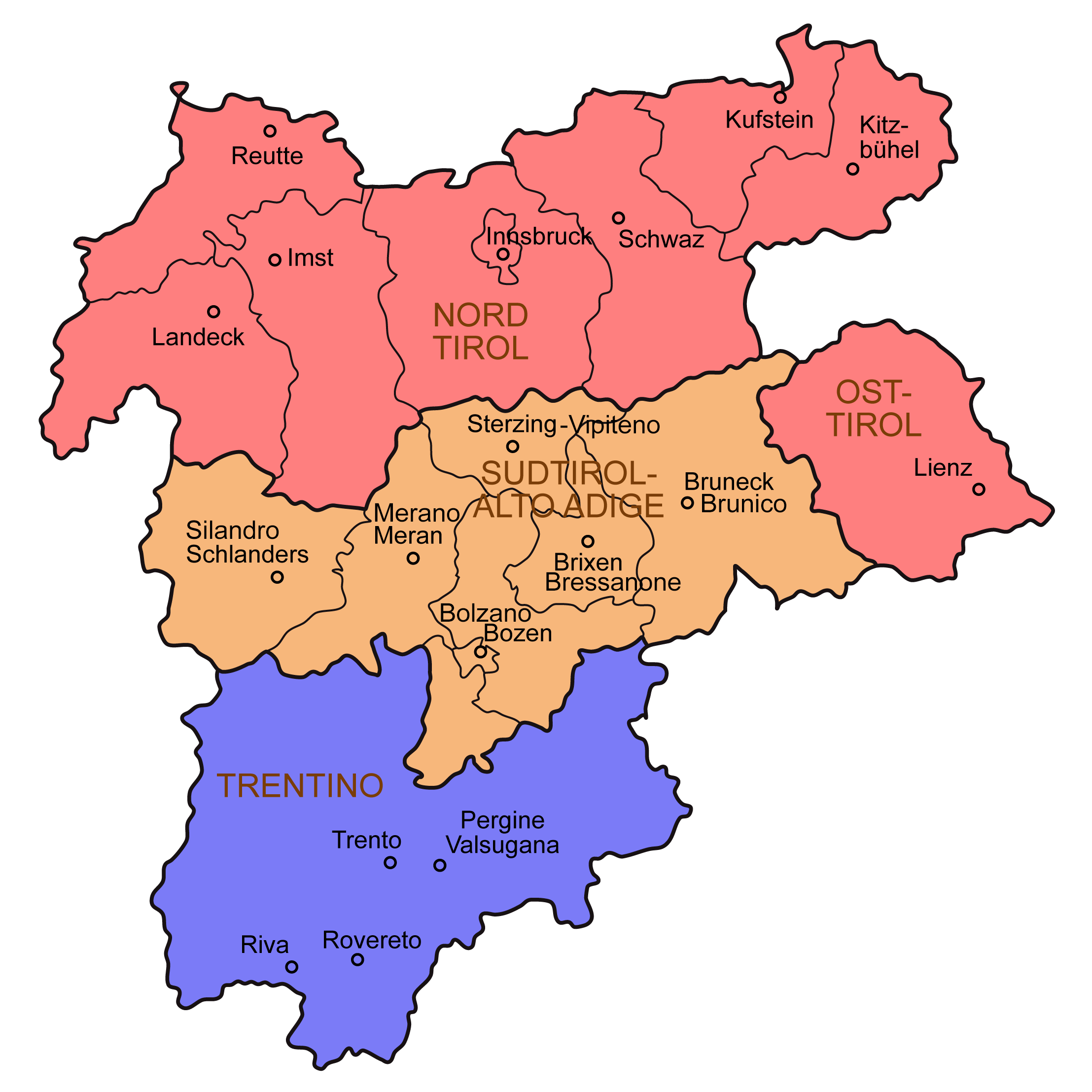
The middle part of Tyrol, partitioned in 1919, contained a large German-speaking majority.

In 1919, at the time of its annexation, the middle part of the County of Tyrol, which is today called South Tyrol (Italian: Alto Adige), was inhabited by almost 90% German speakers. Under the 1939 South Tyrol Option Agreement, Adolf Hitler and Benito Mussolini determined the status of ethnic Germans and Ladins (a Rhaeto-Romance–speaking ethnic group) living in the region. They could emigrate to Germany, or stay in Italy and accept their complete Italianization. As a consequence of this, the society of South Tyrol was deeply riven. Those who wanted to stay, the so-called Dableiber, were condemned as traitors while those who left (Optanten) were defamed as Nazis. Because of the outbreak of World War II, this agreement was never fully implemented. Illegal Katakombenschulen ('Catacomb schools') were set up to teach children the German language.

== Italianization programme ==
=== Fascist period (1922–1945) ===
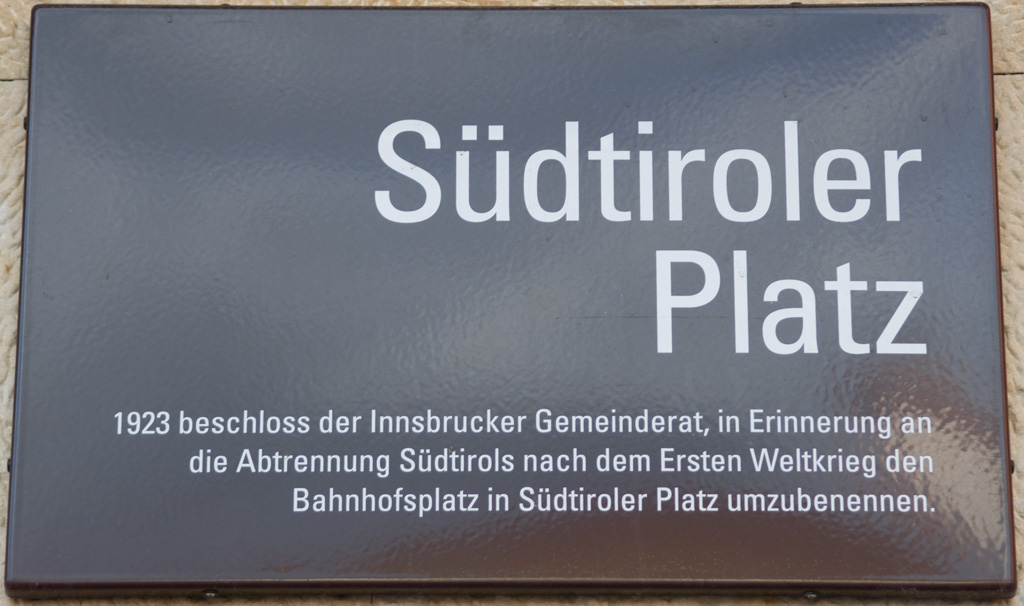
Street sign in Innsbruck, North Tyrol, commemorating the separation of South Tyrol, set up in 1923 in response to the prohibition of the original southern Tyrolean place names

In 1923, three years after South Tyrol had been formally annexed, Italian place names, almost entirely based on the Prontuario dei nomi locali dell'Alto Adige, were made official by means of a decree. The German name "Tyrol" was banned, likewise its derivants and compound words such as "Tyrolean" and "South Tyrolean". German newspapers, publishing houses, organized clubs and associations, including the South Tyrolean Alpine Club had to be renamed, with the decree said to have been strictly enforced by Italian carabinieri on the ground. The basis for these actions was a manifesto published by Ettore Tolomei on 15 July 1923, called the Provvedimenti per l'Alto Adige ('Measures for the Alto Adige'), becoming the blueprint for the Italianization campaign. Its 32 measures were:

1. Association of Alto Adige and Trentino in a single province with the capital city of Trento
2. Appointment of Italian municipal secretaries
3. Revision of the citizenship options and closure of the Brenner border for all persons to whom the Italian citizenship was not granted
4. Entry and residence difficulties for Germans and Austrians
5. Prevention of German immigration
6. Revision of the census of 1921
7. Introduction of Italian as the official language
8. Dismissal of German officials or transfer to the old provinces (i.e., pre-war Italian provinces)
9. Dissolution of the "Deutscher Verband" ('German Association')
10. Dissolution of Alpine associations not under command of the Italian Alpine Club, transfer of all Alpine refuges to the Italian Alpine Club
11. Prohibition of the name "Südtirol" and "Deutsch-Südtirol"
12. Closure of the newspaper Der Tiroler published in Bozen (Bolzano)
13. Italianization of German local names
14. Italianization of public inscriptions
15. Italianization of road and path names
16. Italianization of the German surname
17. Removal of the Walther von der Vogelweide monument from the Walther Square in Bozen (Bolzano)
18. Increase in Carabinieri troops in the province, with the exclusion of Germans
19. Preferential treatment for land acquisition and immigration for Italians
20. Non-interference by foreign powers in South Tyrolean affairs
21. Elimination of German banks, establishment of an Italian mortgage bank
22. Establishment of border customs offices in Sterzing (Vipiteno) and Toblach (Dobbiaco)
23. Generous support for the Italian language and culture
24. Establishment of Italian nursery and primary schools
25. Establishment of Italian secondary schools
26. Strict control of foreign university diplomas
27. Expansion of the "Istituto di Storia per l'Alto Adige" ('Institute for the History of Alto Adige')
28. Realignment of the territory of the Diocese of Brixen and strict control of clergy activity
29. Using only Italian in trials and court
30. State control of the Chamber of Commerce and the agricultural authorities (corporazioni)
31. Extensive programs for new rail junctions to facilitate the Italianization of Alto Adige (rail projects Milan-Mals, Veltlin-Brenner, Agordo-Brixen)
32. Increase military garrisons in Alto Adige

In October 1923, the "use of the Italian language became mandatory on all levels of federal, provincial and local government". Regulations by the fascist authorities required that all kinds of signs and public notices had to be in Italian only, while maps, postcards and other graphic material had to show Italian place names. In September 1925, Italian became the sole permissible language in courts of law, meaning that from then on, cases could be heard only in Italian. The fascist law regulations remained in effect after World War II, becoming a bone of contention for decades until they were eventually reconsidered in the 1990s.

The German-language press, which was still published, was harassed by the authorities and subjected to censorship prior to publication. In 1926 the fascist authorities began to publish their own German-language newspaper, the Alpenzeitung. Other German-language papers were obliged to follow a strictly pro-regime editorial policy.

The programme of Italianization was particularly forcefully applied in schools, aiming at the destruction of the German school system. As of 1928, Italian had become the only language of instruction in 760 South Tyrolean classes, affecting over 360 schools and 30,000 pupils. Likewise, German Kindergartens were required to use Italian, while substitutes were forced to shut down. German teachers were systematically dismissed on the grounds of "insufficient didactics", or transferred to the south, from where Italian teachers were recruited instead. Degrees from Austrian or German universities became valid only through an additional stay of one year at an Italian university.

In religious affairs, a royal decree of November 1923 required religious instruction in Italian for all Italianized schools. Fascist calls for the Italianization of German charitable organizations and religious orders, and the complete abolition of German religious instruction to the Vatican were not entirely successful, not least due to the repeated interventions of the Bishop of Brixen and the setting up of informal parish schools. In state schools, though, Italian became mandatory for the last five classes, while the use of German was only allowed in teaching the Italian catechism in the first three years.

The German-speaking population reacted by the establishment of Katakombenschulen ('catacomb schools'), clandestine home schools outside the Italianized standard educational system. German schoolbooks were secretly smuggled across the border, often hidden in religious buildings before being distributed to the South Tyrolean pupils. After initial difficulties, secret seminars for the instruction of teachers were organized throughout the province, usually under the protection of the Catholic Church. Fascist countermeasures ranged from searches and confiscations to imprisonments and deportations. The balancing act between the instruction in Italian and German schools, where often the exact opposite was taught, especially in history and the social fields, left many Tyrolean pupils with a torn identity. The newly composed Bozner Bergsteigerlied quickly became one of South Tyrol's unofficial hymns by celebrating an unbroken attachment of the South Tyroleans to their homeland. In the 21st century, just over 100 years after the Italian annexation of the region, 64% of the population of South Tyrol speak German as their first and everyday language.

=== Post-war period ===
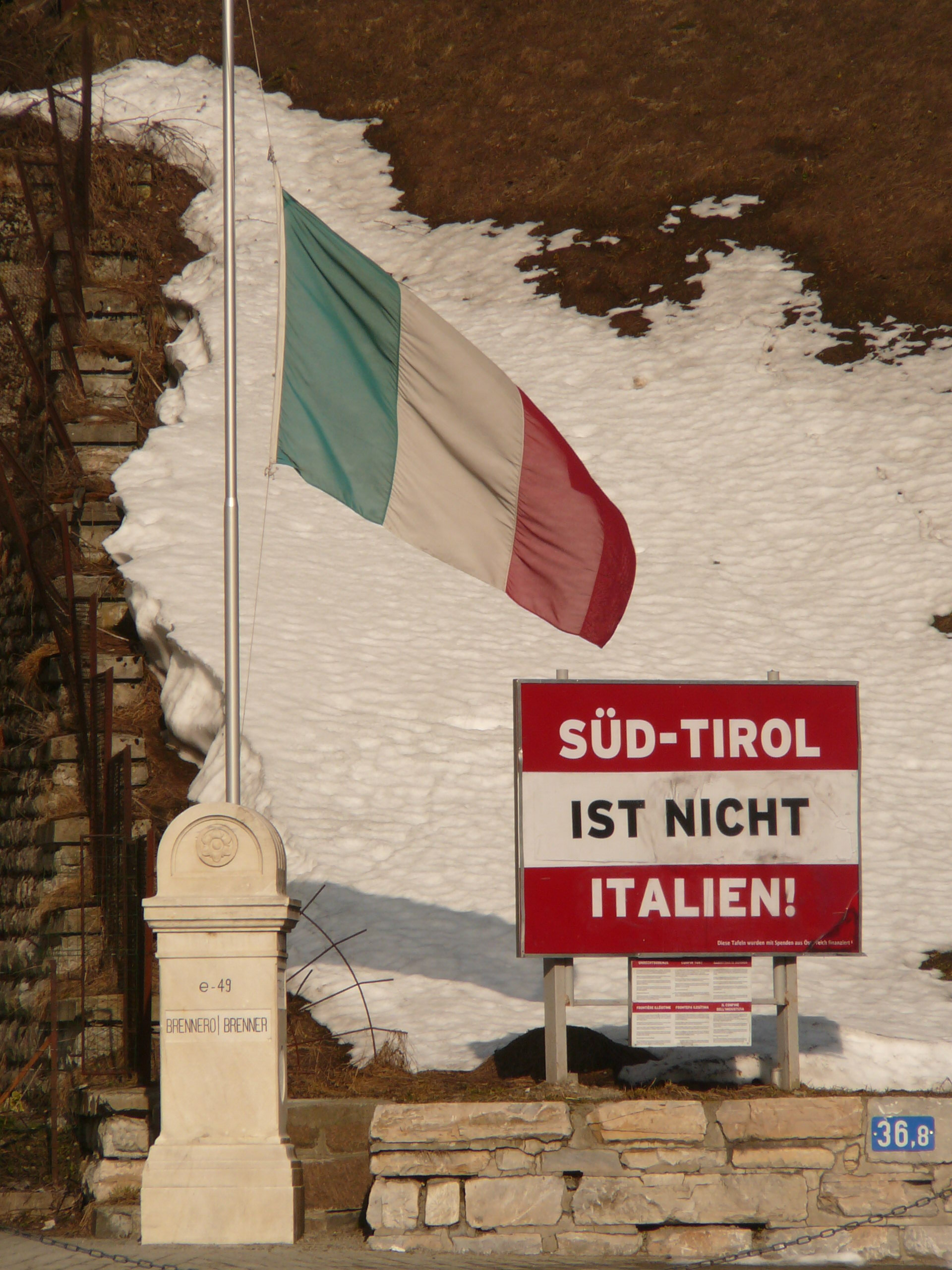
Poster saying "South Tyrol is not Italy!" on the background of an Austrian flag. The poster is located on the Austrian side of the Brennerpass border, not in South Tyrol.

After the end of the Second World War, reform processes tolerated the dual use of names on street signs, while the Italian names remain as the official ones, based on the 1940 law.

In the 1990s, a commission consisting of the Professors Josef Breu (Vienna, representing Austria in the Toponymy commission of the UN), Peter Glatthard (Berne) and Carlo Alberto Mastrelli (Florence, current "Archivio per l'Alto Adige") failed as Mastrelli insisted on the fascist decrees, while Breu and Glatthard promoted the UN guidelines.

== See also ==
- Italianization
- Prontuario dei nomi locali dell'Alto Adige

== Sources ==
- Steininger, Rolf (2003). South Tyrol: a minority conflict of the twentieth century. New Brunswick, N.J., U.S.A: Transaction Publishers. ISBN 0-7658-0800-5.
- Georg Grote, Hannes Obermair (2017). A Land on the Threshold. South Tyrolean Transformations, 1915–2015. Oxford, Bern, New York: Peter Lang. pp. 417+. ISBN 978-3-0343-2240-9.
