= Tramin an der Weinstraße =

Tramin
- Comune
- Gemeinde Tramin an der Weinstraße; Comune di Termeno sulla Strada del Vino
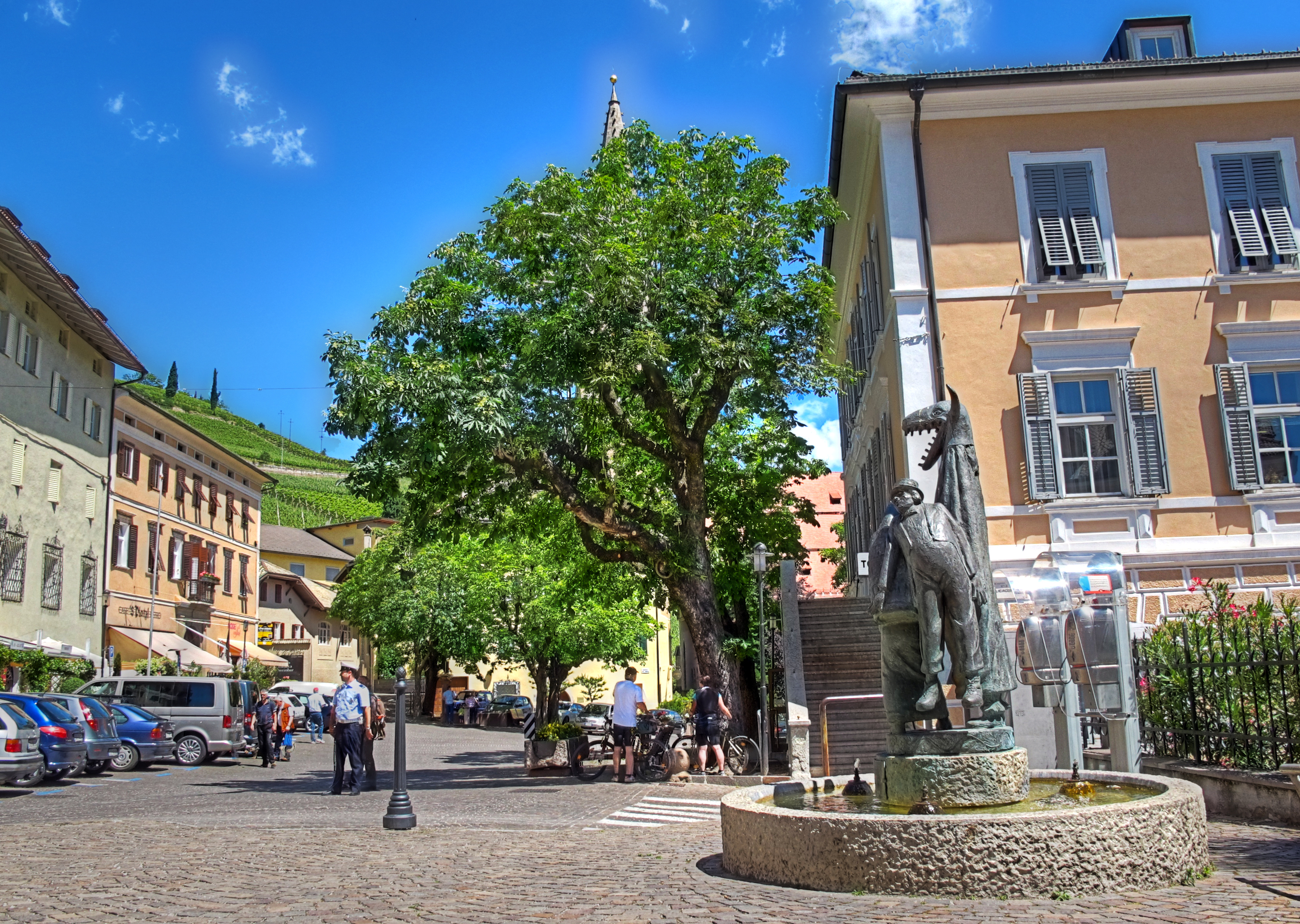
- Market place

- Coat of arms

- Location within Italy Location within Trentino-Alto Adige/Südtirol
- Coordinates: 46°21′N 11°15′E
- Country: Italy
- Region: Trentino-Alto Adige/Südtirol
- Province: South Tyrol (BZ)
- Frazioni: Rungg (Ronchi), Söll (Sella)

Government
  - Mayor: Wolfgang Oberhofer

Area
  - Total: 19.4 km^{2} (7.5 sq mi)
- Elevation: 276 m (906 ft)

Population (Nov. 2010)
  - Total: 3,296
  - Density: 170/km^{2} (440/sq mi)
- Demonym(s): German: Traminer; Italian: di Termeno
- Time zone: UTC+1 (CET)
  - Summer (DST): UTC+2 (CEST)
- Postal code: 39040
- Dialing code: 0471
- Website: Official website

Tramin an der Weinstraße (Austrian German: [traˈmiːn an deːɐ̯ ˈvaɪnˌʃtraːsɛ]; Italian: Termeno sulla Strada del Vino [terˈmɛːno sulla ˈstraːda del ˈviːno]), often abbreviated to Tramin or Termeno, is a comune (municipality) in South Tyrol, northern Italy, located about 20 kilometres (12 miles) southwest of the city of Bolzano. The name of the grape variety Gewürztraminer has its origins in Tramin.

== Geography ==
As of November 30, 2010, Tramin had a population of 3,296 and an area of 19.4 square kilometres (7.5 sq mi).

The municipality contains the frazioni (subdivisions, mainly villages and hamlets) Rungg (Ronchi) and Söll (Sella).

Tramin borders the following municipalities: Amblar, Kaltern, Coredo, Kurtatsch, Neumarkt, Montan, Auer, Sfruz and Vadena.

== History ==
=== Coat of arms ===
The emblem represents a six points star of or surmounted by an or overturned crescent on azure background. The origin of the coat is not known but derives from that of Lords of Eppan. The arms were granted in 1929.

== Landmarks ==
- St. James's Church, a church on Kastelaz hill.

== Society ==
=== Linguistic distribution ===
According to the 2024 census, 94.99% of the population speak German, 4.69% Italian and 0.32% Ladin as first language.

=== Demographic evolution ===
Historical population

Year	Pop.	±%
1860	?	—
1870	?	—
1880	1,798	—
1900	?	—
1910	2,424	—

Year	Pop.	±%
1921	2,810	+15.9%
1931	2,862	+1.9%
1936	2,734	−4.5%
1951	2,743	+0.3%
1961	2,828	+3.1%

Year	Pop.	±%
1971	2,886	+2.1%
1981	2,935	+1.7%
1991	2,963	+1.0%
2001	3,193	+7.8%

Source: Data from ISTAT

== Twin cities ==
Tramin is twinned with:

- (Germany) Rödermark, since 1978
- (Germany) Mindelheim, since 1994
- (Austria) Schwaz, since 1998
