= Prontuario dei nomi locali dell'Alto Adige =

List of Italianized toponyms in South Tyrol

The Prontuario dei nomi locali dell'Alto Adige (Italian: Reference Work of Place Names of Alto Adige) is a list of Italianized toponyms aimed at replacing the place names used by the German language community in South Tyrol (Alto Adige in Italian) which was published in 1916 by the Royal Italian Geographic Society (Reale Società Geografica Italiana). The list later formed an important part of the Italianization campaign initiated by the fascist regime, as it became the basis for the official place names in the predominantly German-speaking Italian-annexed southern part of the County of Tyrol.

Given the political background of its creation and implementation, the Prontuario has remained a politically contentious topic between the German-speaking and the Italian-speaking communities in South Tyrol.

== Development ==
In the 1890s Ettore Tolomei founded a nationalist magazine The Italian Nation, and in 1906, the Archivio per l'Alto Adige. His intention was to create the impression that South Tyrol had originally been an Italian territory, that the German history of South Tyrol was merely a short interruption and that as a consequence the land rightfully belonged to Italy.

Toponymy played a major part in Tolomei's struggle right from the beginning. In the articles he wrote for The Italian Nation he already used Italianized names, although these early attempts lacked the method and purpose of his later activities. In those days he would use the name Alto Trentino for South Tyrol, not having yet come upon and revived the Napoleonic creation Alto Adige, which would become the official Italian designation for the province after World War I and up to this day. Likewise, he used to call the Brenner Pass "Pirene", which in his later publications would become "Brennero". His work became more systematical with the founding of the Archivio per l' Alto Adige, through which he began to propose Italianized names for villages and geographical features in South Tyrol. In 1916, a year after Italy, instigated by Allied promises and its own nationalist tendencies, entered the First World War, a commission was set up to find Italian names for places in the "soon to be conquered territory". The commission (composed of Tolomei himself, the Professor of Botany and Chemistry Ettore De Toni as well as the librarian Vittorio Baroncelli) reported almost 12,000 Italian place and district names on the basis of Tolomei's studies. In June 1916, this list was published as Volume XV, Part II of Memorie of the Reale Società Geografica Italiana as well as in the Archivio per l'Alto Adige.

== Methodology ==
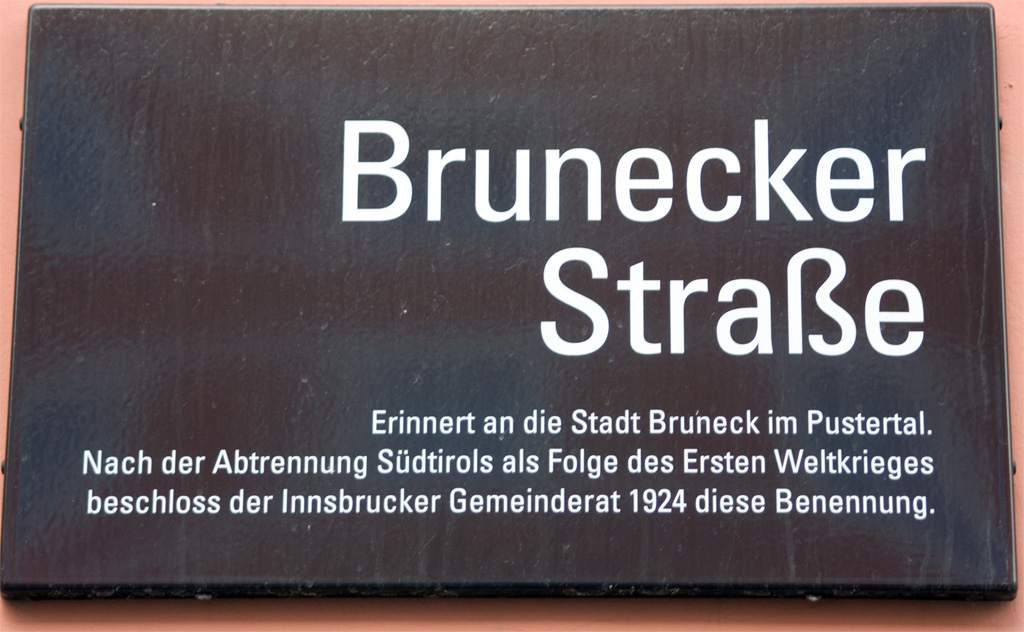
Street sign in Innsbruck, Tyrol, commemorating the city of Bruneck, set up in 1923 in response to the prohibition of the original southern Tyrolean place names

Tolomei explained the methodology for creating Italian names in his introduction to the Prontuario. The main principles are:

1. Ladin names would be adapted to the current Italian pronunciation;
2. Pre-existing Italian names: e.g. (Bozen/Bolzano, Meran/Merano) were mostly unchanged, though there are exceptions;
3. Names of pre-Romance and Rhaetic origin were not changed when adopted by the Romance-speaking population. Germanized Rhaetic names were replaced by the allegedly original version or by a historical Latinized form. The same method was applied in the case of names with a Celtic origin;
4. German names going back to a Romance form were to be returned to their Latin antecedent;
5. Irreducibly German names were translated into Italian or substituted with Italian names. This was done by phonetic reduction, where the name was simply Italianized (normally by adding a vowel to the end of the name): e.g. Brenner/Brennero, Moos/Moso. Or by direct translation, e.g. Lago Verde ('green lake') for Grünsee; this was a frequent source of mistakes, as Linsberg was translated with Monte Luigi, a name also used as the translation of Luisberg; Blumau was wrongly interpreted as 'flower meadow', and translated to Prato all'Isarco. Alternatively, the name of the patron saint of the town was used, e.g. Innichen/San Candido, or the Italian name was inspired by geographical derivations: e.g. Colle Isarco ('Hill-upon-Isarco') for Gossensaß.

This methodology was however not applied in a uniform, consistent manner, so that often the choice of name were criticised to have been arbitrary — thus increasing the perception of imposition. While the aim of Tolomeis toponymy was that of bringing the Latin history back to the surface, more often than not it has been perceived as to bury the Romance roots of historically grown names even deeper due to the relative linguistic incompetence of Tolomei and his team. This can be exemplified by the name of the village Lana, which probably goes back to a Roman landholder named Leo, whose territory was called (praedium) Leonianum. In the High Middle Ages, the name was pronounced Lounan. In the Bavarian dialect, the vocal ou changed to a in the 12th century, leading to Lanan, which became today's Lana in German. Contrary to his stated methodology Tolomei kept the name Lana, probably because it sounded Italian and in Italian lana means 'wool'. The correct Italianization would have been "Leoniano" (although exact reconstruction may have been abandoned in favor of pragmatism and aesthetics). The same applies to German Trens and Terenten, derived from Latin torrens ('stream'), which were Italianized as Trens and Terento, not recognizing the Romanic roots still present in the German name.

Apart from the frequent mistakes and inconsistencies of Tolomei's toponymy, according to critics, its main fault is the loss of historical information contained in the historically grown geographical names, an effect which was fully intended by Tolomei. Instead of bringing back Alpine Romanity which spoke a Rhaeto-Romance language, he superimposed a distant substitute to the area, the Tuscan dialect, on which Standard Italian is based, rather than examining a variant of Italian dialect closer to the Alpine region (local Romanic traditions). A case in point is the name Vipiteno, derived from Latin Vipitenum. Tolomei preferred this Latin name to Sterzen, the name commonly used by Italians at that time. In doing so, however, he unwittingly chose a name which had undergone Germanization. The original Alpine-Romanic name would have been Vibidina; the German sound change in the 8th century changed this into Wipitina. As such it was first mentioned in the medieval Latin manuscripts, and in the more recent ones it was further Latinized into Vipitenum, a name which sounded as if it could have been of ancient Roman origin and thus was chosen by Tolomei.

Some academics like Giovan Battista Pellegrini or Johannes Kramer have positively judged the linguistic correctness of some of the new names.

== See also ==
- Related to Italy and the German-speaking world:
  - 1938 renaming of East Prussian placenames
  - German as a minority language
  - History of South Tyrol
  - Italianization of South Tyrol
  - List of renamed places in Italy
- Commission for the Determination of Place Names in the territories annexed by Poland after World War II.
- Geographical name changes in Greece
- Geographical renaming
- List of city name changes
- List of renamed places in South Africa
- Neighborhood rebranding in New York City
- Renaming of cities in India
