= Bronzolo =

- Comune
- Comune di Bronzolo; Gemeinde Branzoll
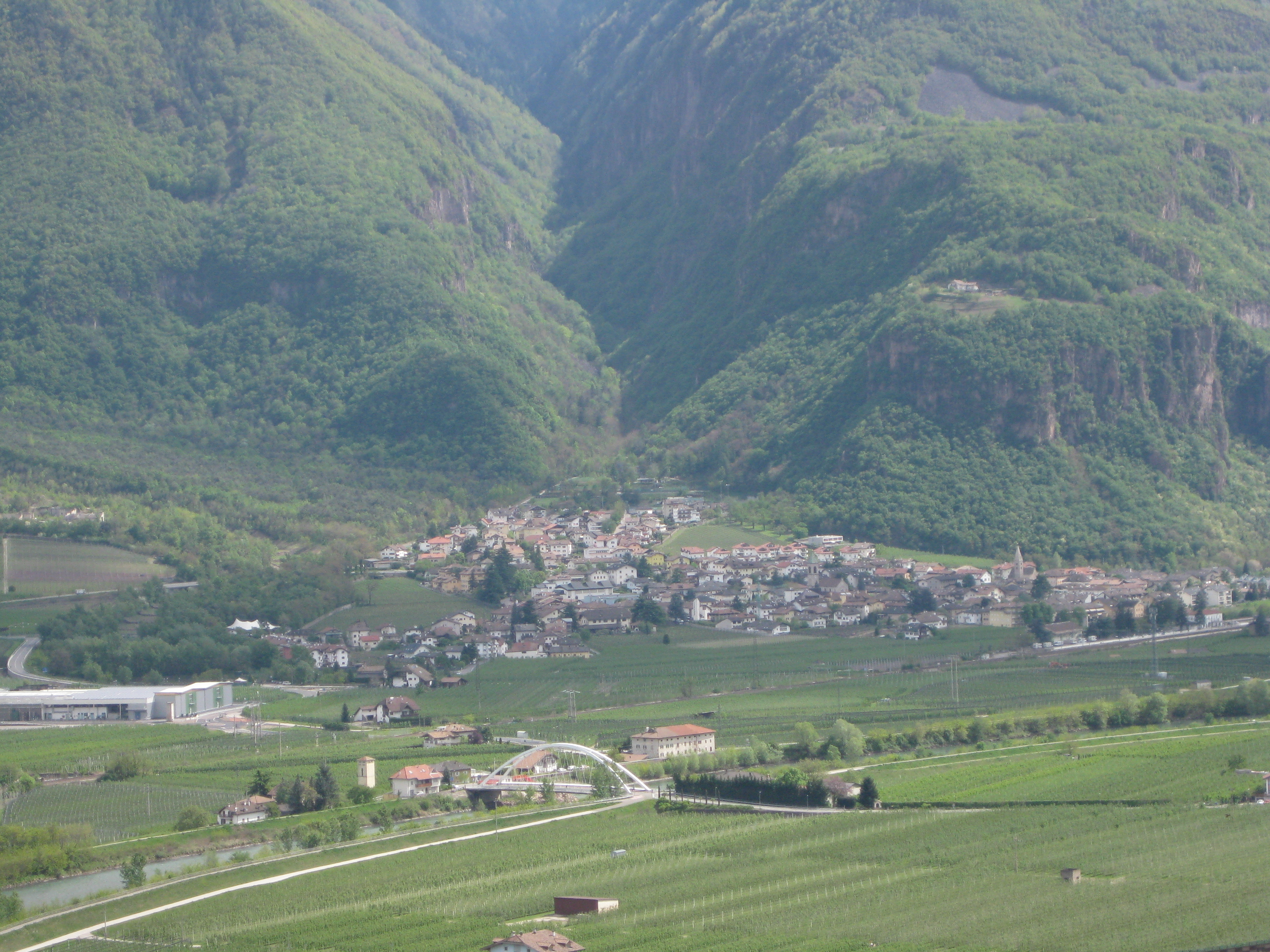
- Bronzolo / Branzoll seen from the northwest

- Coat of arms

- Location within Italy Location within Trentino-Alto Adige/Südtirol
- Coordinates: 46°24′N 11°19′E
- Country: Italy
- Region: Trentino-Alto Adige/Südtirol
- Province: South Tyrol (BZ)

Government
  - Mayor: Giorgia Mongillo

Area
  - Total: 7.4 km^{2} (2.9 sq mi)
- Elevation: 263 m (863 ft)

Population (Nov. 2010)
  - Total: 2,652
  - Density: 360/km^{2} (930/sq mi)
- Demonym(s): Italian: bronzolotti German: Branzoller
- Time zone: UTC+1 (CET)
  - Summer (DST): UTC+2 (CEST)
- Postal code: 39051
- Dialing code: 0471
- Website: Official website

Bronzolo (Italian pronunciation: [bronˈdzɔːlo]; German: Branzoll [branˈtsɔl]) is a comune (municipality) and a village in South Tyrol in northern Italy, located about 11 kilometres (7 mi) south of the city of Bolzano. It is one of only six mainly Italian speaking municipalities in South Tyrol.

== Geography ==
As of 30 November 2010, it had a population of 2,652 and an area of 7.4 square kilometres (2.9 mi^{2}).

Bronzolo borders the following municipalities: Aldein, Laives, Deutschnofen, Auer and Vadena.

== History ==
=== Coat-of-arms ===
The arms is party per bend sinister of argent and vert. At the center is a sable cornet trimmed with a cord of or. The vert represents the Etsch mountain and the valleys; the cornet is a reference to the village's long use as a mail station. The emblem was adopted in 1968.

== Society ==
=== Linguistic distribution ===
According to the 2024 census, 63.46% of the population speak Italian, 35.88% German and 0.66% Ladin as first language.

| Language | 2001 | 2011 | 2024 |
|---|---|---|---|
| German | 39.68% | 37.34% | 35.88% |
| Italian | 59.85% | 62.01% | 63.46% |
| Ladin | 0.47% | 0.65% | 0.66% |

=== Demographic evolution ===
Historical population

| Year | Pop. | ±% |
|---|---|---|
| 1861 | ? | — |
| 1871 | ? | — |
| 1881 | ? | — |
| 1901 | ? | — |
| 1911 | ? | — |

| Year | Pop. | ±% |
|---|---|---|
| 1921 | 1,525 | — |
| 1931 | 1,762 | +15.5% |
| 1936 | 1,662 | −5.7% |
| 1951 | 1,550 | −6.7% |
| 1961 | 1,704 | +9.9% |

| Year | Pop. | ±% |
|---|---|---|
| 1971 | 1,561 | −8.4% |
| 1981 | 1,595 | +2.2% |
| 1991 | 1,973 | +23.7% |
| 2001 | 2,293 | +16.2% |

Source: Data from ISTAT
