= Neumarkt, South Tyrol =

Italian comune in the South Tyrol province

Neumarkt
- Comune
- Gemeinde Neumarkt; Comune di Egna
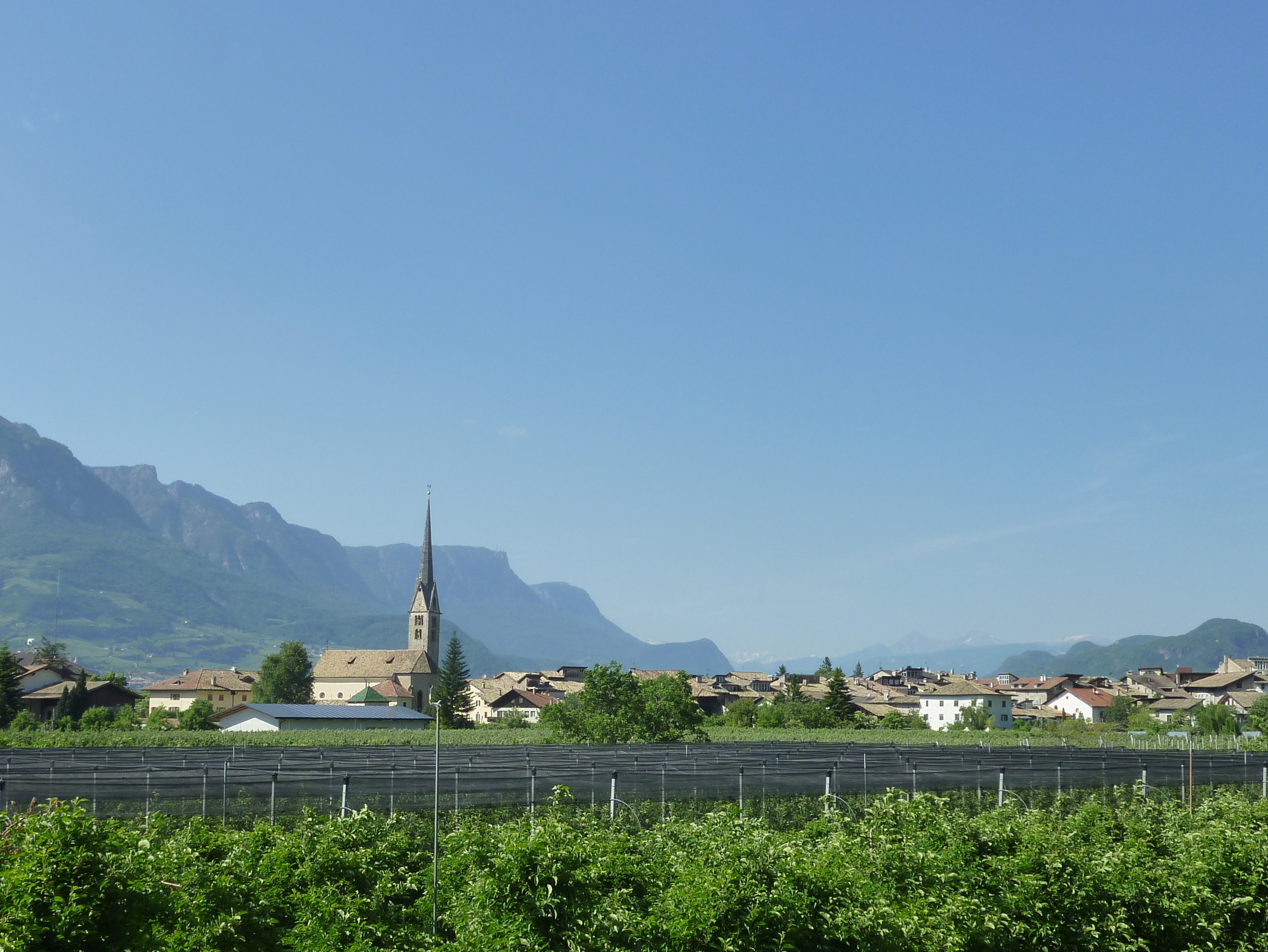
- View from the south

- Location of Neumarkt/Egna in the province of South Tyrol.

- Location within Italy Location within Trentino-Alto Adige/Südtirol
- Coordinates: 46°19′1″N 11°16′1″E
- Country: Italy
- Region: Trentino-Alto Adige/Südtirol
- Province: South Tyrol (BZ)
- Frazioni: Laag (Laghetti), Mazon (Mazzon), St. Florian (San Floriano), Vill (Villa)

Government
  - Mayor: Karin Jost (South Tyrolean People's Party)

Area
  - Total: 23 km^{2} (8.9 sq mi)
- Elevation: 214 m (702 ft)

Population (Nov. 2010)
  - Total: 5,001
  - Density: 220/km^{2} (560/sq mi)
- Demonym(s): German: Neumarktner; Italian: egnesi
- Time zone: UTC+1 (CET)
  - Summer (DST): UTC+2 (CEST)
- Postal code: 39044
- Dialing code: 0471
- Saint day: 6 December
- Website: Official website

Neumarkt (German: [ˈnɔʏmarkt], lit. 'New Market') or Egna (Italian: [ˈeɲɲa]) is a comune (municipality) and a village in South Tyrol in northern Italy, located about 25 kilometres (16 mi) south of the city of Bolzano. It is one of I Borghi più belli d'Italia ("The most beautiful villages of Italy").

== Geography ==
As of 30 November 2010, it had a population of 5,001 and an area of 23 square kilometres (8.9 mi^{2}).

Neumarkt borders the following municipalities: Kaltern, Kurtatsch, Kurtinig, Margreid, Montan, Salorno and Tramin.

Neumarkt serves as the administrative center of the Überetsch-Unterland district. Recognized as the region's primary cultural, historical, and artistic hub, the municipality features a distinguished historic center. Its jurisdiction encompasses the surrounding communities of Vill, Laag, and Mazon. Demographically, Neumarkt is the third most populous town in the district, trailing only Laives and Eppan, which are integrated into the greater Bolzano metropolitan area.

The town is situated on the plain, elevation 214 metres (702 ft), on the left side of the Adige river.

Neumarkt was a Roman village on the Claudia Augusta road; it was called Endidae. The sightseeing include the arcades of the old town, the parish church, the Local Culture Museum and the church of Vill.

=== Frazioni ===
The municipality of Neumarkt contains the frazioni (subdivisions, mainly villages and hamlets) Laag (Laghetti), Mazon (Mazzon), St. Florian (San Floriano) and Vill (Villa).

== History ==
=== Coat-of-arms ===
The escutcheon is party per pale, the left side represents the argent crescent moon on a gules background; in the right side a gules cross, with shortened arms, on an argent background. In a document dated 1395 Albrecht of Austria, brother of Duke Rudolf IV of Austria granted to the village, then called Newnmarkt, the use of the arms. The emblem was granted in 1967.

== Society ==
=== Linguistic distribution ===
According to the 2024 census, 60.78% of the population speak German, 38.84% Italian and 0.38% Ladin as first language.

=== Notable people ===
- Lilli Gruber (born 1957 in Neumarkt), journalist and former politician

=== Sport ===
The ice hockey team HC Neumarkt-Egna is based in the town.
