= Vadena =

- Comune
- Comune di Vadena; Gemeinde Pfatten
- Location within Italy Location within Trentino-Alto Adige/Südtirol
- Coordinates: 46°25′N 11°18′E
- Country: Italy
- Region: Trentino-Alto Adige/Südtirol
- Province: South Tyrol
- Frazioni: Piccolongo (Piglon)

Government
  - Mayor: Elmar Oberhofer

Area
  - Total: 13.5 km^{2} (5.2 sq mi)
- Elevation: 243 m (797 ft)

Population (July 2023)
  - Total: 1,101
  - Density: 81.6/km^{2} (211/sq mi)
- Demonym(s): Italian: vadenesi German: Pfattner
- Time zone: UTC+1 (CET)
  - Summer (DST): UTC+2 (CEST)
- Postal code: 39051
- Dialing code: 0471
- Website: Official website

Vadena (Italian pronunciation: [ˈvaːdena]; German: Pfatten [ˈpfatn̩]) is a comune (municipality) in South Tyrol in northern Italy, located about 10 kilometres (6 mi) southwest of the city of Bolzano. It is one of only six mainly Italian speaking municipalities in South Tyrol.

== Geography ==
As of November 30, 2010, it had a population of 1,005 and an area of 13.5 square kilometres (5.2 mi^{2}).

Vadena borders the following municipalities: Auer, Bolzano, Bronzolo, Eppan, Kaltern, Laives and Tramin.

=== Frazioni ===
The municipality of Vadena contains the frazione (subdivision) Piccolongo (Piglon) and is home to the medieval castle of Laimburg.

== History ==
=== Coat-of-arms ===
The emblem is party per fess of argent and vert with a thin fess of argent under the division. In the first part is depicted in a central position, a green mountain with the ruins of a tower, and on each side two highest mountains. In the second part is a thin barry wavy of argent. The emblem symbolizes the geographical position of the municipality: the ruins of the tower represent the Laimburg Castle, the two peaks of the Mitterberg, the thin band of the motorway A22 and the wavy river Adige. The coat of arms was granted in 1969.

== Society ==
=== Linguistic distribution ===
According to the 2024 census, 61.52% of the population speak Italian, 38.14% German and 0.34% Ladin as their first language.

Language	2001	2011	2024
German	42.40%	38.06%	38.14%
Italian	57.09%	61.50%	61.52%
Ladin	0.51%	0.44%	0.34%

=== Demographic evolution ===
Historical population

Year	Pop.	±%
1860	?	—
1870	?	—
1880	437	—
1900	?	—
1910	565	—

Year	Pop.	±%
1921	602	+6.5%
1931	624	+3.7%
1936	668	+7.1%
1951	706	+5.7%
1961	708	+0.3%

Year	Pop.	±%
1971	679	−4.1%
1981	560	−17.5%
1991	707	+26.2%
2001	842	+19.1%
2021	1,076	+27.8%

Source: Data from ISTAT
