= Kurtinig an der Weinstraße =

Kurtinig
- Comune
- Gemeinde Kurtinig an der Weinstraße; Comune di Cortina sulla Strada del Vino
- Location within Italy Location within Trentino-Alto Adige/Südtirol
- Coordinates: 46°16′N 11°13′E
- Country: Italy
- Region: Trentino-Alto Adige/Südtirol
- Province: South Tyrol (BZ)

Government
  - Mayor: Manfred Mayr (South Tyrolean People's Party)

Area
  - Total: 2.0 km^{2} (0.77 sq mi)

Population (Nov.2010)
  - Total: 646
  - Density: 320/km^{2} (840/sq mi)
- Demonym(s): German:Kurtiniger; Italian: cortineri
- Time zone: UTC+1 (CET)
  - Summer (DST): UTC+2 (CEST)
- Postal code: 39040
- Dialing code: 0471
- Website: Official website

Kurtinig an der Weinstraße (Austrian German: [kʊrˈtiːnɪɡ an deːɐ̯ ˈvaɪnˌʃtraːsɛ]) or Cortina sulla Strada del Vino (Italian: [korˈtiːna sulla ˈstraːda del ˈviːno]), often abbreviated to Kurtinig or Cortina, is a comune (municipality) and a village in South Tyrol in northern Italy, located about 30 kilometres (19 mi) southwest of the city of Bolzano.

As of 30 November 2010, it had a population of 646 and an area of 2.0 square kilometres (0.77 mi^{2}).

Kurtinig borders the following municipalities: Margreid, Neumarkt, and Salorno.

== History ==
=== Coat-of-arms ===
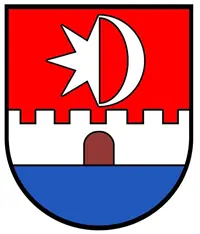
Coat-of-arms

The emblem is an argent embattled wall, with a portal, above an azure band in the lower half; an eight-pointed star on the left side and the crescent moon on the right, both of argent on a gules background, in the upper half. The embattled wall was built to protect the village from the flooding of the river Adige; the star and the moon are a recall to the arms of the Lords of Appian which the village belonged.

== Society ==
=== Linguistic distribution ===
According to the 2024 census, 72.00% of the population speak German, 27.67% Italian and 0.33% Ladin as first language.

=== Demographic evolution ===
Historical population

Year	Pop.	±%
1861	?	—
1871	?	—
1881	?	—
1901	?	—
1911	?	—

Year	Pop.	±%
1921	349	—
1931	426	+22.1%
1936	423	−0.7%
1951	428	+1.2%
1961	483	+12.9%

Year	Pop.	±%
1971	522	+8.1%
1981	477	−8.6%
1991	552	+15.7%
2001	594	+7.6%

Source: Data from ISTAT
