= Auer, South Tyrol =

Auer
- Comune
- Marktgemeinde Auer; Comune di Ora
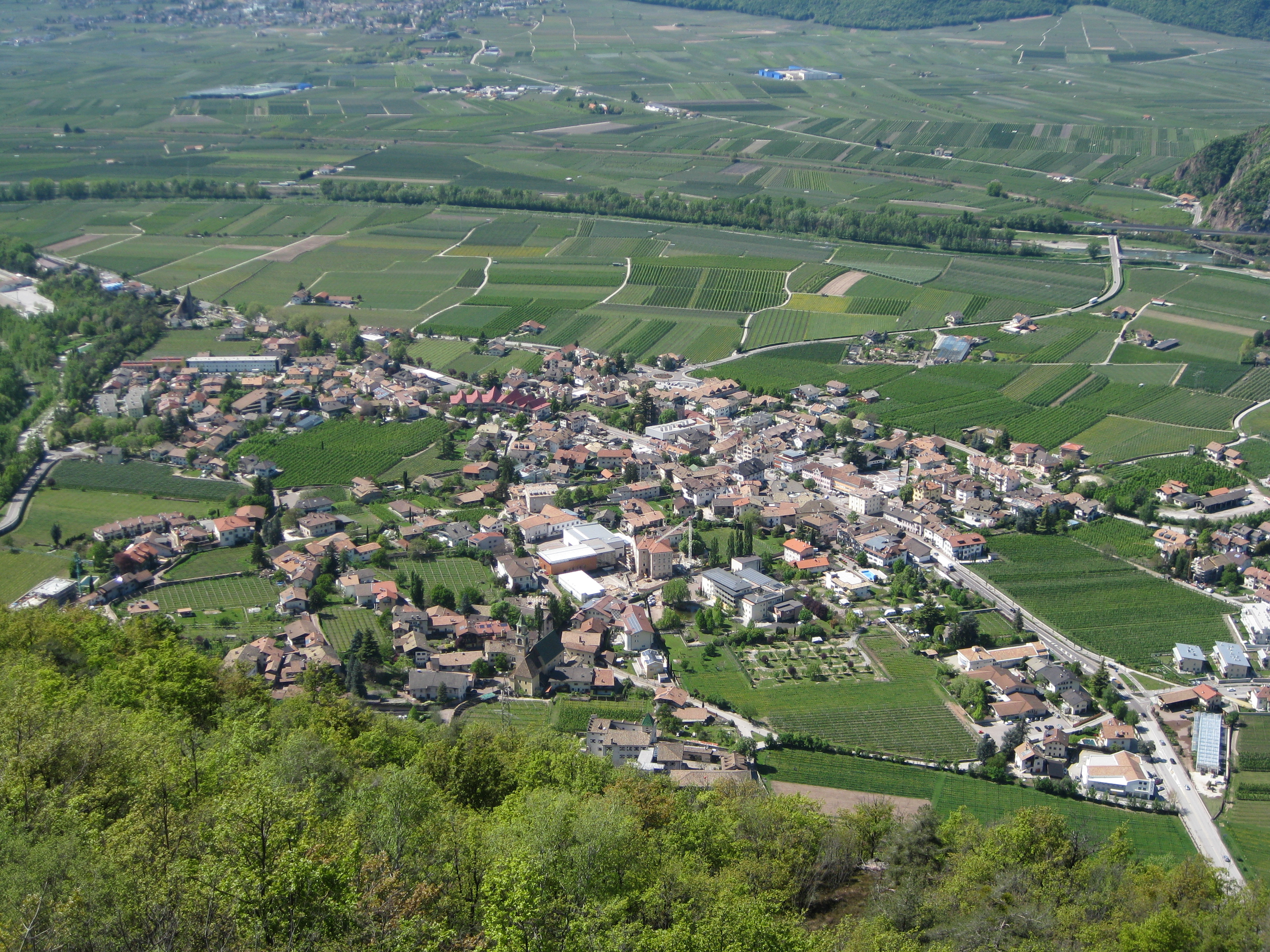
- View of Auer

- Location within Italy Location within Trentino-Alto Adige/Südtirol
- Coordinates: 46°21′N 11°18′E
- Country: Italy
- Region: Trentino-Alto Adige/Südtirol
- Province: South Tyrol (BZ)

Government
  - Mayor: Martin Feichter

Area
  - Total: 11.8 km^{2} (4.6 sq mi)
- Elevation: 236 m (774 ft)

Population (Dec. 2015)
  - Total: 3,648
  - Density: 309/km^{2} (801/sq mi)
- Demonyms: German: Auer; Italian: orensi
- Time zone: UTC+1 (CET)
  - Summer (DST): UTC+2 (CEST)
- Postal code: 39040
- Dialing code: 0471
- Website: Official website

Auer (German pronunciation: [ˈaʊɐ]; Italian: Ora [ˈɔːra]) is a municipality (Italian: comune) and a village in South Tyrol, northern Italy, about 15 kilometres (9 mi) south of the city of Bolzano.

== Geography ==
As of 31 December 2015, it had a population of 3,648 and an area of 11.8 square kilometres (4.6 mi^{2}).

Auer borders the following municipalities: Aldein, Bronzolo, Montan and Vadena.

== History ==
The name of the settlement is firstly mentioned in a deed of 1190 written in Latin which names Conradinus de Aura, a servant of the Enn noblemen.

The village of Auer emerged as an association of people as early as the 15th century, as a corresponding document from 1463 attests with the explicit naming of the "comunitas ville Awer" – the community of the village of Auer – and its Riegler (land managers).

In 2022, two Stolperstein were laid for Martin Krebs and Ida Kaufmann, both local victims of the Holocaust during the Operationszone Alpenvorland period of 1943–44.

=== Coat of arms ===
The shield is party per fess of argent and gules with an azure chief with a rampant lion. It is the emblem of the Khuen family, who took possession of the site from 1397 until 1690, when they were then elevated to Imperial Counts. On the azure chief, two crossed or keys are represented as a remembrance of the insignia of St. Peter, to whom the parish church is dedicated. The emblem was adopted in 1969.

== Society ==
=== Linguistic distribution ===
According to the 2024 census, 68.45% of the population speak German, 31.28% Italian and 0.27% Ladin as first language.

Language	2001	2011	2024
German	69.91%	69.74%	68.45%
Italian	29.84%	29.59%	31.28%
Ladin	0.25%	0.67%	0.27%

=== Demographic evolution ===
Historical population

Year	Pop.	±%
1861	?	—
1871	?	—
1881	?	—
1901	?	—
1911	?	—

Year	Pop.	±%
1921	1,650	—
1931	1,798	+9.0%
1936	1,919	+6.7%
1951	1,879	−2.1%
1961	2,239	+19.2%

Year	Pop.	±%
1971	2,318	+3.5%
1981	2,444	+5.4%
1991	2,637	+7.9%
2001	3,022	+14.6%

Source: Data from ISTAT
