= Margreid an der Weinstraße =

Margreid
- Comune
- Gemeinde Margreid an der Weinstraße; Comune di Magrè sulla Strada del Vino
- Coat of arms

- Location within Italy Location within Trentino-Alto Adige/Südtirol
- Coordinates: 46°17′N 11°13′E
- Country: Italy
- Region: Trentino-Alto Adige/Südtirol
- Province: South Tyrol (BZ)
- Frazioni: Unterfennberg (Favogna di Sotto)

Government
  - Mayor: Andreas Bonell

Area
  - Total: 13.9 km^{2} (5.4 sq mi)
- Elevation: 241 m (791 ft)

Population (November 2010)
  - Total: 1,302
  - Density: 93.7/km^{2} (243/sq mi)
- Demonym(s): German: Margreider; Italian: Magresi
- Time zone: UTC+1 (CET)
  - Summer (DST): UTC+2 (CEST)
- Postal code: 39040
- Dialing code: 0471
- Website: Official website

Margreid an der Weinstraße (Austrian German: [marˈɡraɪd an deːɐ̯ ˈvaɪnˌʃtraːsɛ]; Italian: Magrè sulla Strada del Vino [maˈɡrɛ ssulla ˈstraːda del ˈviːno]), often abbreviated to Margreid or Magrè, is a comune (municipality) and a village in South Tyrol in northern Italy, located about 25 kilometres (16 mi) southwest of the city of Bolzano.

Margreid borders the following municipalities: Kurtatsch, Kurtinig, Neumarkt, Roverè della Luna and Salorno.

== Coat-of-arms ==
The emblem is party per fess, of gules and sable, with an or horn. It is the arms of the family Ob der Platten who lived in the village until 1511. The emblem, which was adopted in 1968, appeared as a seal in 1780.

== Linguistic distribution ==
According to the 2024 census, 83.38% of the population speak German, 16.35% Italian and 0.27% Ladin as first language.
