= Aldein =

Municipality in South Tyrol, Italy

- Comune
- Gemeinde Aldein; Comune di Aldino
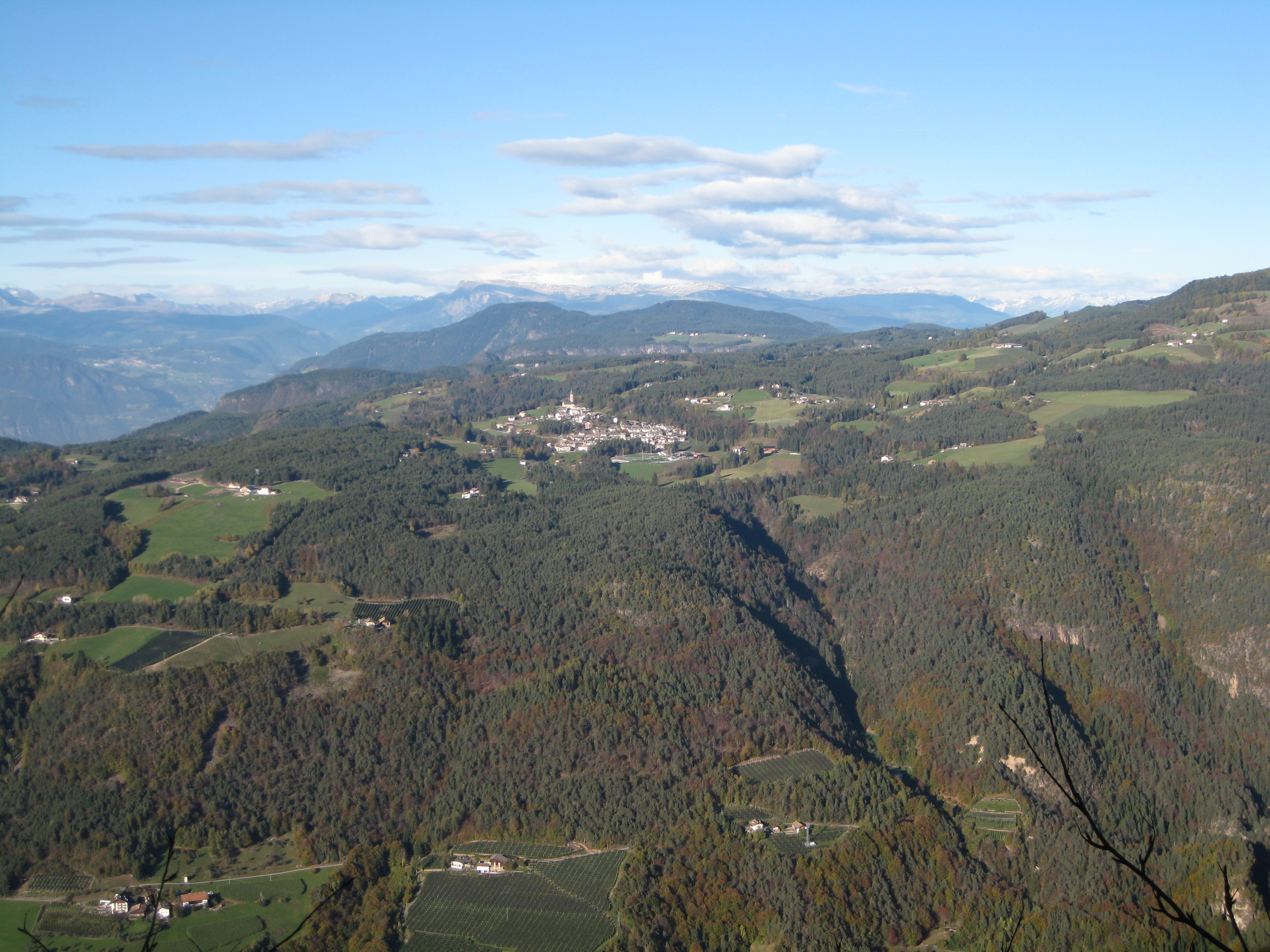
- View of Aldein

- Coat of arms

- Location of Aldein in Italy Aldein (Trentino-Alto Adige/Südtirol)
- Coordinates: 46°22′N 11°21′E
- Country: Italy
- Region: Trentino-Alto Adige/Südtirol
- Province: South Tyrol (BZ)
- Frazioni: Radein (Redagno)

Government
  - Mayor: Charlotte Oberberger Pichler

Area
  - Total: 63.2 km^{2} (24.4 sq mi)
- Elevation: 1,225 m (4,019 ft)

Population (31 August 2020)
  - Total: 1,648
  - Density: 26.1/km^{2} (67.5/sq mi)
- Demonyms: Italian: di Aldino; German: Aldeiner (Natives: Voldeiner)
- Time zone: UTC+1 (CET)
  - Summer (DST): UTC+2 (CEST)
- Postal code: 39040
- Dialing code: 0471
- Website: Official website

Aldein (German: [alˈdaɪn]; Italian: Aldino [alˈdiːno]) is a comune (municipality) and a village in South Tyrol in northern Italy, located about 15 kilometres (9 mi) south of the city of Bolzano.

Aldein borders the following municipalities: Bronzolo, Montan, Deutschnofen, Auer, Truden and Ville di Fiemme. It contains the frazione (subdivision) Radein (Redagno).

== History ==
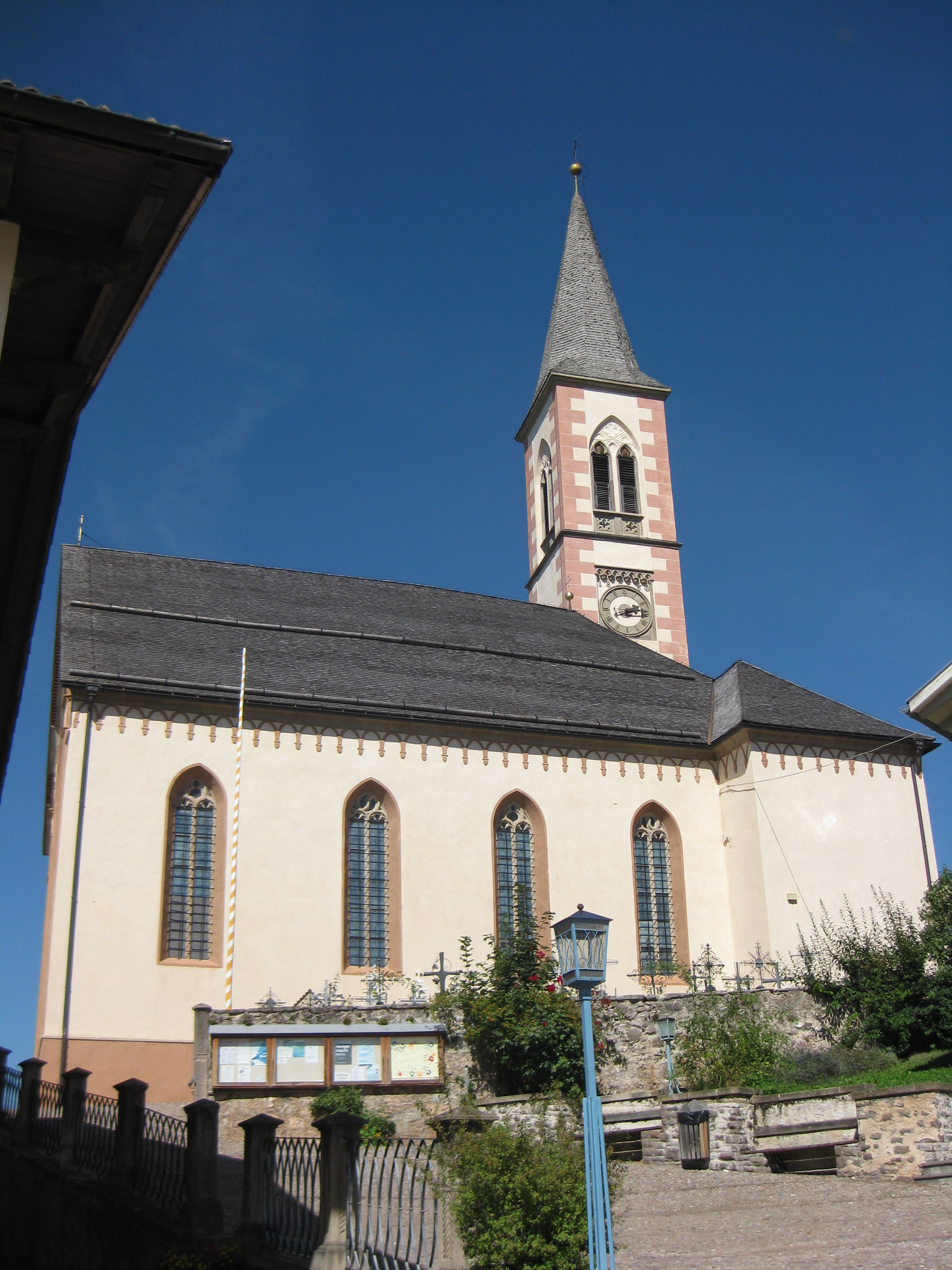
Parish Church of Saint Helena

A settlement called Aldinum is mentioned for the first time in 1177, in 1185 the name appears as Alden.

== Coat-of-arms ==
The coat of arms is divided party per fess; on the top are two quarter-circle, azure on argent background that represents the Weisshorn. The lower part shows the argent cross of Saint Andrew shortened that represents the four original hamlets on a gules background as the mountain of porphyrite. The arms were adopted in 1969.

== Linguistic distribution ==
According to the 2024 census, 97.89% of the population speak German, 1.85% Italian and 0.26% Ladin as first language.

Language	1991	2001	2011	2024
German	98.84%	98.38%	98.07%	97.89%
Italian	0.97%	1.37%	1.74%	1.85%
Ladin	0.19%	0.25%	0.19%	0.26%
