= Truden im Naturpark =

- Comune
- Comune di Trodena nel parco naturale Gemeinde Truden im Naturpark
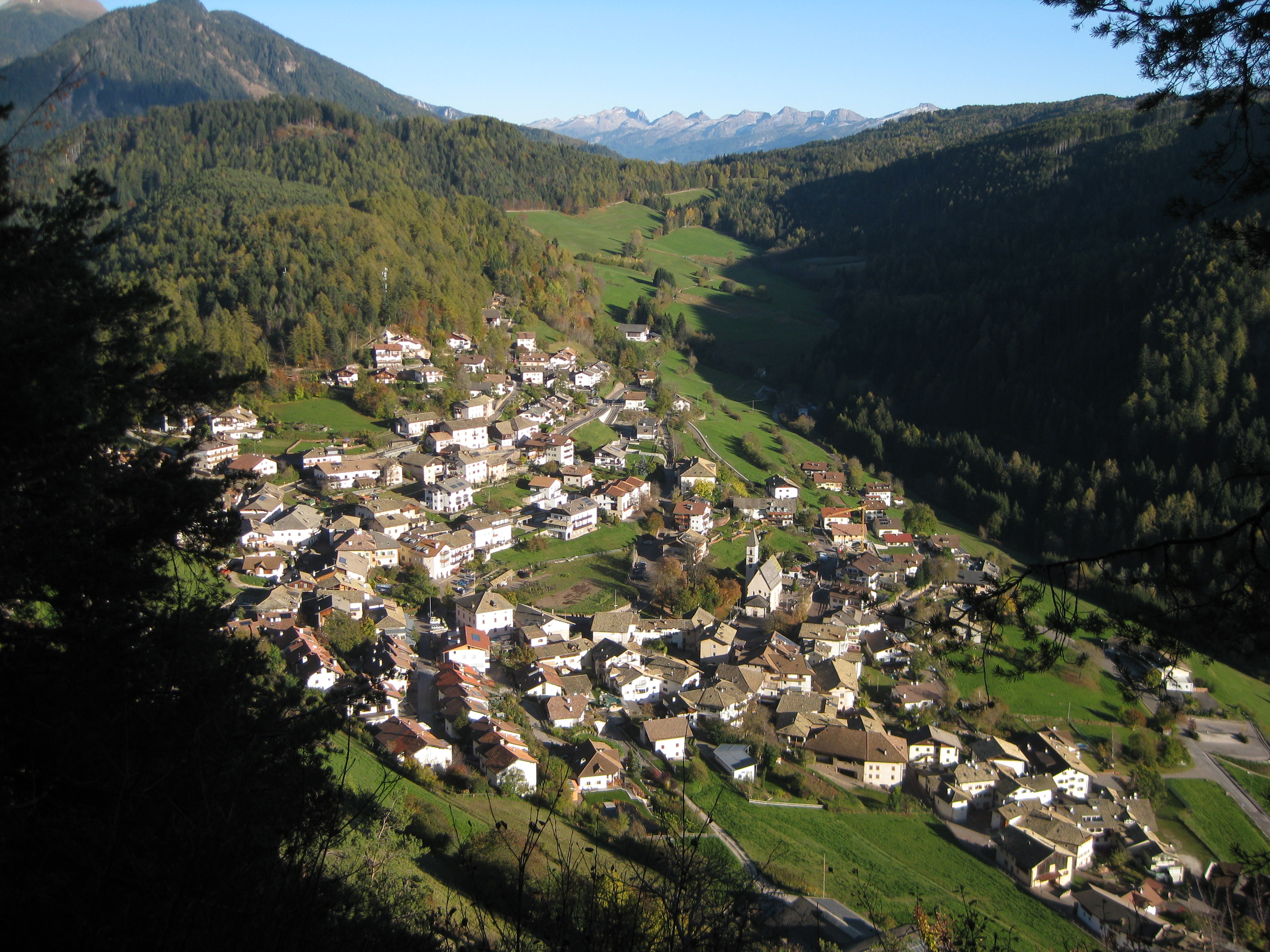
- General view of the village

- Location within Italy Location within Trentino-Alto Adige/Südtirol
- Coordinates: 46°19′N 11°21′E
- Country: Italy
- Region: Trentino-Alto Adige/Südtirol
- Province: South Tyrol (BZ)
- Frazioni: Kaltenbrunn (Fontanefredde), Mühlen (Molini di Trodena), San Lugano

Government
  - Mayor: Michael Epp (SVP)

Area
  - Total: 20.7 km^{2} (8.0 sq mi)
- Elevation: 1,127 m (3,698 ft)

Population (Nov. 2010)
  - Total: 1,007
  - Density: 48.6/km^{2} (126/sq mi)
- Demonym(s): German: Trudner; Italian: trodenesi
- Time zone: UTC+1 (CET)
  - Summer (DST): UTC+2 (CEST)
- Postal code: 39040
- Dialing code: 0462
- Website: Official website

Truden im Naturpark (German pronunciation: [ˈtruˑdn̩ ɪm naˈtuɐpark]; Italian: Trodena nel parco naturale [ˈtroːdena nel ˈparko natuˈraːle]) is a comune (municipality) in South Tyrol in northern Italy, located about 20 kilometres (12 mi) south of the city of Bolzano. Until March 2008 it was called simply Truden.

== Geography ==
As of November 30, 2010, it had a population of 1,007 and an area of 20.7 square kilometres (8.0 mi^{2}).

Truden borders the following municipalities: Aldein, Altrei, Capriana, Carano, and Montan.

=== Frazioni ===
The municipality of Truden contains the frazioni (subdivisions, mainly villages and hamlets) Kltenbrunn (Fontanefredde), Mühlen (Molini di Trodena), and San Lugano.

== History ==
=== Coat-of-arms ===
The shield is barry of four of argent and gules and represents the crosier and the martyrdom hook, both of or in saltire with two palm branches on each side and a mitre over all. The emblem, granted in 1930, represents the insignia of Saint Blaise the patron saint.

== Society ==
=== Linguistic distribution ===
According to the 2024 census, 76.05% of the population speak German, 23.33% Italian and 0.63% Ladin as first language.

=== Demographic evolution ===
Historical population

Year	Pop.	±%
1861	?	—
1871	?	—
1881	?	—
1901	?	—
1911	?	—

Year	Pop.	±%
1921	873	—
1931	975	+11.7%
1936	978	+0.3%
1951	907	−7.3%
1961	988	+8.9%

Year	Pop.	±%
1971	979	−0.9%
1981	938	−4.2%
1991	946	+0.9%
2001	957	+1.2%

Source: Data from ISTAT
