= Montan an der Weinstraße =

- Comune
- Gemeinde Montan an der Weinstraße; Comune di Montagna sulla Strada del Vino
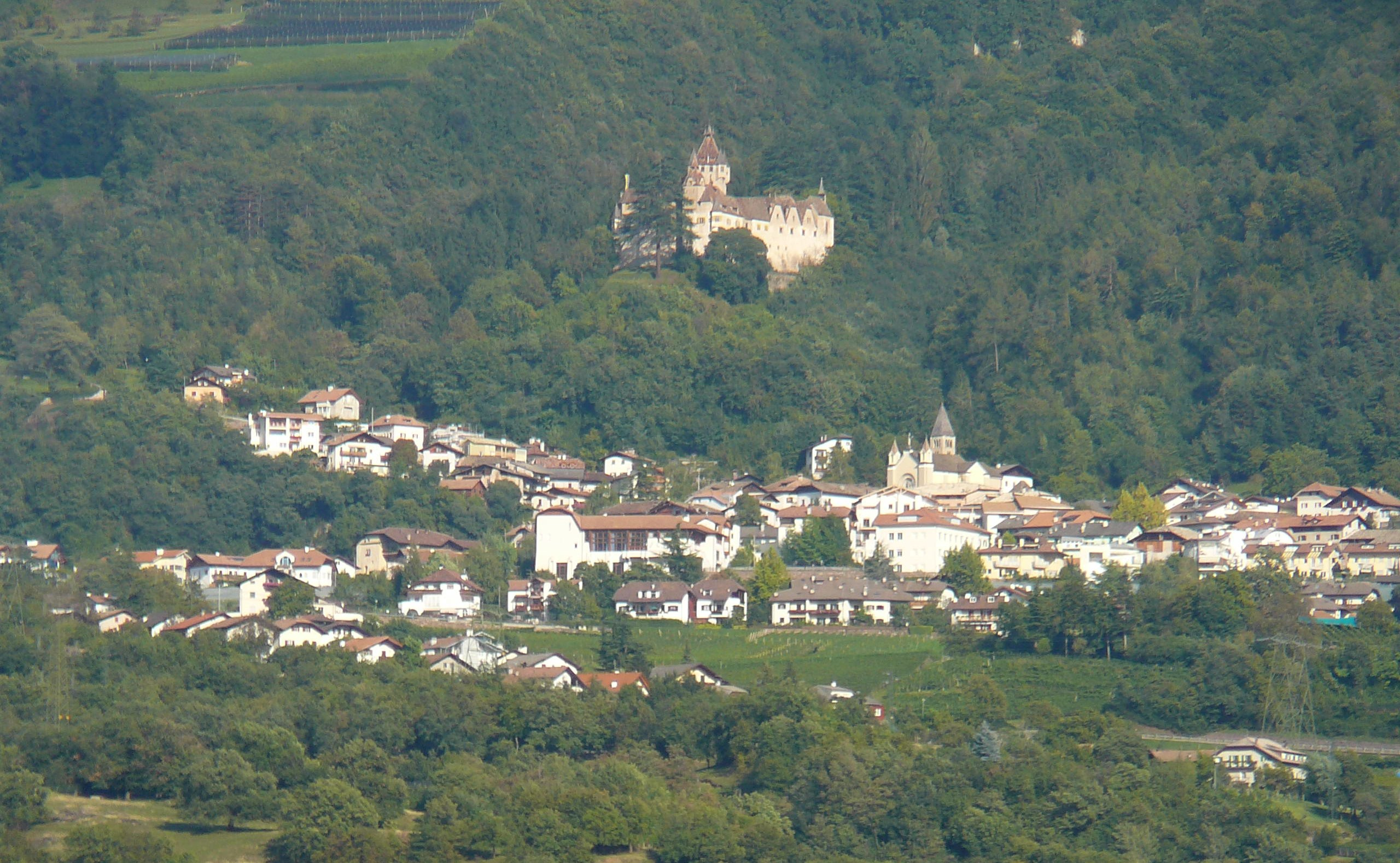
- View of Montan an der Weinstraße

- Location within Italy Location within Trentino-Alto Adige/Südtirol
- Coordinates: 46°20′N 11°18′E
- Country: Italy
- Region: Trentino-Alto Adige/Südtirol
- Province: South Tyrol (BZ)
- Frazioni: Glen (Gleno), Gschnon (Casignano), Kaltenbrunn (Fontanefredde), Pinzon (Pinzano)

Government
  - Mayor: Leo Tiefenthaler

Area
  - Total: 19.51 km^{2} (7.53 sq mi)
- Elevation: 497 m (1,631 ft)

Population (31 December 2020)
  - Total: 1,707
  - Density: 87.49/km^{2} (226.6/sq mi)
- Demonym(s): German: Montaner; Italian: montagnesi
- Time zone: UTC+1 (CET)
  - Summer (DST): UTC+2 (CEST)
- Postal code: 39040
- Dialing code: 0471
- Patron saint: St. Bartholomew
- Saint day: 24 August
- Website: Official website

Montan an der Weinstraße (Italian: Montagna sulla Strada del Vino) is a municipality with 1,701 inhabitants (as of 31 December 2018) and a village in the South of South Tyrol in northern Italy, about 15 km (9.3 miles) south of Bolzano. The name Montan derives from the Latin mons ("mountain").

== Geography ==
Totalling 18.91 km^{2} (7.30 square miles), the area extends on the orographically left, i.e. eastern flank of the South Tyrolean Lowlands (Unterland), as the section of the Adige valley between Bolzano and the Salorno chasm is called. The main settlement areas are located on a wide hillside terrace, on which sits the main town of Montan (390–530 m or 1,280–1,740 feet); somewhat south of it lie the two districts Pinzon (390–430 m or 1,280–1,410 feet) and Glen (520–580 m or 1,710–1,900 feet). The Castelfeder hill (405 m or 1,329 feet) between Neumarkt and Auer protrudes west of the main town into the Adige valley. Below the hill, the municipality of Montan also occupies a small part of the valley floor up to the Adige river.

To the east of the main town, the terrain rises to the Cislon (1,563 m or 5,128 feet), a ridge of the forested mountain range that is part of the Fiemme Valley, which separates Unterland from Fiemme. This vast majority of this ridge is part of the protected Trudner Horn Nature Park and borders on the municipality of Truden. To the North, the Schwarzenbach valley forms the border to Aldein; here, a narrow strip of the municipality encloses parts of Kaltenbrunn (970–1,000 m or 3,180–3,280 feet). In the south, another strip of territory crosses the Truden stream valley and – bordering Neumarkt, Salorno, Truden and Capriana in Trentino – occupies the northwestern slopes of the Trudner Horn (1,781 m or 5,843 feet), where the small settlement of Gschnon (930–960 m or 3,050–3,150 feet) is located.

== Frazioni ==
The municipality of Montan contains the frazioni (subdivisions, mainly villages and hamlets) Glen (Gleno), Gschnon (Casignano), Kaltenbrunn (Fontanefredde), Kalditsch (Doladizza), and Pinzon (Pinzano).

== Coat-of-arms ==
The emblem represents an argent lion, with fixed eyes and claws of or, on azure. It is the arms of the Lords of Enn who built the Castle in the twelfth century. The emblem was granted in 1967.

== History ==
Finds from the pre-Christian area show that early settlements in the Montan area date back to that period. Results from linguistics research in the field of place and field names support this assumption. Local names of pre-Roman (Gomaroa, Tschalfai) and Romanesque (Kalditsch, Montan, Glen, Pinzon) origin suggest a lively settlement activity in the centuries BC and AD. Around 955, Bavarian settlers began colonising the area. This colonisation culminated in the 12th century and ended in the mid-13th century. In 1133, the possession of the Weyarn monastery was registered at Enn court, as was the Sonnenburg monastery in Kalditsch in 1181. The lords of Enn appeared in Montan in the mid-12th century.

In 1435, Pastor Hans Hach of Montan ("her Hans Hach pharrer zu Montæny") was a member of the South Tyrolean priesthood, which pledged to hold the Austrian anniversary in Holy Mary parish church in Bozen. Until the end of the First World War, Montan belonged to the county of Tyrol and thus to the Austro-Hungarian empire. Within Tyrol, Montan was assigned to the Neumarkt judicial district, which in turn was part of the Bozen district. With the Treaty of Saint-Germain, Montan, along with most of Tyrol south of the main ridge of the Alps, was ceded to Italy in 1920. When these former Austrian territories became the two provinces of Bozen and Trento in 1927, Montan and other surrounding villages were assigned to the predominantly Italian-speaking province of Trento. In 1948 that Montan became again part of the province of Bolzano/South Tyrol.

The municipality of Montagna/Montan is renamed Montagna sulla Strada del Vino/Montan an der Weinstraße on 14 April 2023.

== Linguistic distribution ==
According to the 2024 census, 91.92% of the population speak German, 7.71% Italian and 0.37% Ladin as first language.

== Education ==
There is a German-language primary school in Montan, which is part of the school district of the neighbouring municipality of Auer.

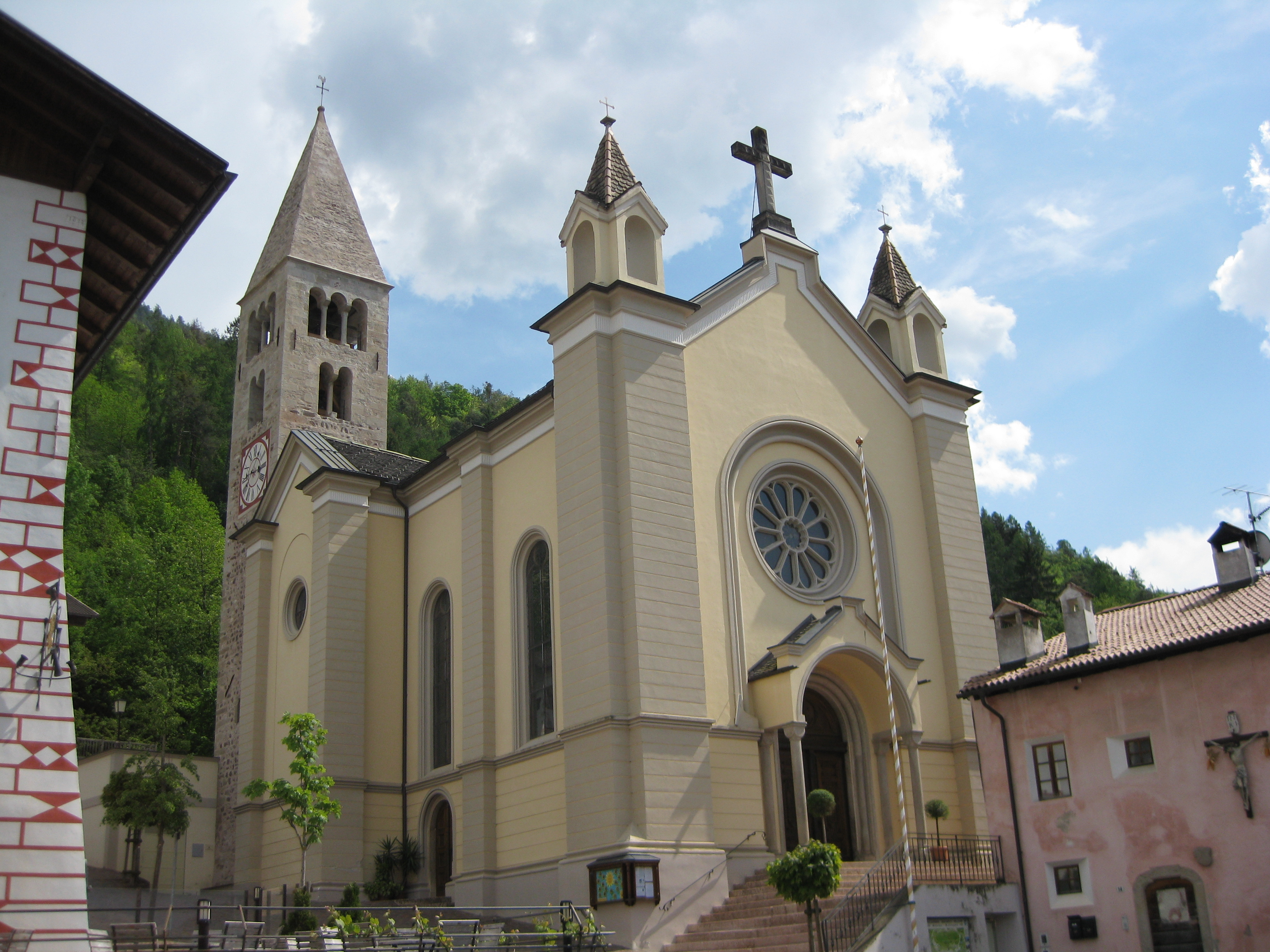
The parish church

== Main sights ==
- Castelfeder is a prehistoric and Roman settlement on a strategically important porphyry hill near Montan (South Tyrol) above Auer and represents a multi-sectioned, spacious dome. The upper “fortress” rises around 190 m (620 feet) above the valley floor and is located at 405 m (1,329 feet) above sea level.
- Enn castle
- Hans-Klocker altar, a winged altar by master Hans Klocker from Brixen in the St. Stefan church in Pinzon
- The cemetery holds the tomb of the Italian nationalist Ettore Tolomei.
- The former Fleimstal railway track is a destination for hikers in Montan. This railway line was built during the First World War. The route begins in Auer and originally led to Predazzo. A cycling and hiking trail now follows the well-preserved section between Auer and San Lugano.

== Twin cities ==
- Nuremberg, Germany
