= Standschützen =

Historical Tyrolean militia unit

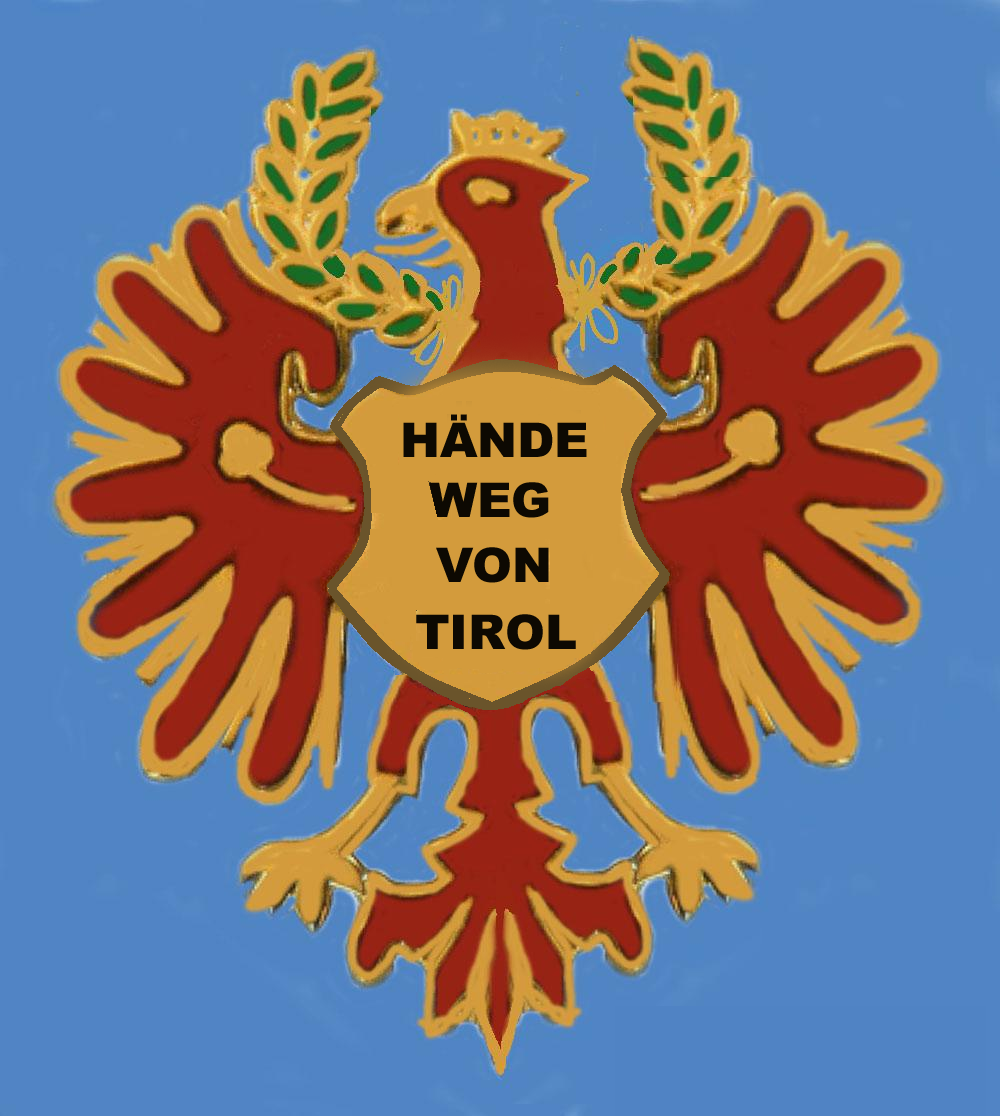
Capbadge of the Tyrolese Standschützen. The caption reads "Hands off Tyrol".

The Standschützen (singular: Standschütze (Note: The German noun Standschütze is a so-called nominal composition, composed of the nouns Stand- (en = social position, standing, status) and -Schütze (en = rifle man). In the Imperial-Royal Austria (e.g. Vorarlberg and Tirol) it referred to members of the Schützenstand (en = rifle guild) or a Schützenverein (en = shooting club). Standschützen were skilled in precision shooting and often volunteered for deployments in a k.k. Standschützen units.)) were originally rifle guilds and rifle companies that had been formed in the 15th and 16th centuries, and were involved time and again in military operations within the borders of the Austrian County of Tyrol. A Standschütze was a member of a Schützenstand ("shooting club"), into which he was enrolled, (Note: enrolliert is the Austrian military jargon for "enrolled" (from the Old French enroller).) which automatically committed him to the voluntary, military protection of the state of Tyrol (and Vorarlberg). In effect they were a type of Tyrolean local militia or home guard.

Even though the regular army was already stationed in the Tyrol and Vorarlberg, voluntary Standschützen were often called up, for example in the War of the First Coalition of 1796–1797, the revolutions of 1848 in the Austrian Empire, the Austro-Sardinian War of 1859 and the Austro-Prussian War of 1866. The highlights of their military involvement, however, were undoubtedly their struggle for freedom under Andreas Hofer against their Bavarian and French occupiers, culminating in the Battles of Bergisel, and their mobilization during the First World War.

The origins of the Standschützen are found in the Landlibell, a deed issued by Emperor Maximilian I dating to 1511, and a decree by Archduchess Claudia de' Medici of 1632, in which each Tyrolean judicial district had an obligation to provide volunteers, capable of acting as fighting men, the number to be determined in each case depending on the threat, to form of a Landwehr for the defence of the state.

== Development ==
In the late 19th century, the hitherto independent militia rifle companies were placed under command of the military and sponsored and supported as sources of manpower that could be used for the territorial defence of the state. The now officially titled Standschützen were given the opportunity to practise shooting under better conditions than before to be prepared to defend their homeland in a crisis.

The National Defence Act of 1887 specified that organizations formed for territorial defence were henceforth to be regarded as part of the armed forces, and were to be divided into the Standschützen, supplemented by new firing ranges, and the Landsturm.

With the enactment of regulations (§ 17) in the National Defence Act for Tyrol and Vorarlberg on 25 May 1913 and the law relating to firing range regulations (same date), the Schießstände (literally "firing ranges" but referring to the shooting clubs with their enrolled members) and all other entities of a military character (veterans and military societies) became liable for Landsturm service. From this point on, every registered Standschütze was committed to Landsturm duty; he was no longer regarded as a volunteer. Only those Standschützen enlisting after mobilization retained the title of "volunteer". Discharge from the militia was prevented by law from August 1914. From that date, the Standschützen were regarded as regular troops by the Hague Convention. They could only be deployed in their own country and used to defend the country's borders. However, this stipulation was not observed in the last years of the war.

== Formation ==
The formation of a Schießstand or shooting club could be carried out if there were at least 20 eligible men from one or more neighbouring villages or districts. Every Tyrolese and Vorarlberg male over 17 years of age who was physically and mentally fit to shoot was eligible. It was mandatory for every member to participate in at least four exercises per year and to fire at least 60 shots on each occasion as part of a proper training plan. These shooting clubs had no military importance in peacetime.

The Standschützen had the right to elect their own officers (which, to many serving officers, was a thorn in the side). The men first elected all the officers, initially to the rank of lieutenant. The officers then elected, from amongst themselves, the captains and the company commander and they, in turn, elected the major as battalion commander. The highest rank was major because Andreas Hofer was only a Standschützen major and no one was intended or allowed to be placed above him. The result of the election had to be notified to the military chain of command and confirmed by "His Majesty". Only in the rarest cases, was this rejected, as in the case of Standschützen officer who had been convicted and demoted years before to six months imprisonment.

The officers of the Standschützen had the same ranks as the regular army and a Standschützen command was the equivalent of a command in the army, even if it was commanded by an officer of lower rank. The officers of the Standschützen wore as rank badges the star rosettes of military officers in goldwork on grass-green gorgets in the same pattern as that of the other members of their arm of service.

Overall, there were 65,000 riflemen (Standschützen) in 444 Schießständen in North, East, South and Welsch Tyrol.

== Garrison and recruiting locations ==
The following tables show the location of the garrison and recruiting areas for the various Standschützen units. The abbreviation "k.k." stands for "Imperial-Royal".

Battalions	Companies
k.k. Standschützen Battalion No. IX, Auer	1 Coy, Auer/Aldein/Radein – 2 Coy, Leifers/Branzoll – 3 Coy, Neumarkt/Salurn – 4 Coy, Deutschnofen/Petersberg – 5 Coy, Montan/Truden
k.k. Standschützen Battalion No. I, Bozen	1 Coy, Bozen – 2 Coy, Bozen – 3 Coy, Ritten
k.k. Standschützen Battalion No. IV, Brixen	1 Coy, Brixen – 2 Coy, Brixen/St. Andrä – 3 Coy, Neustift/Vahrn/Natz – 4 Coy, Lüsen/Afers
k.k. Standschützen Battalion, Enneberg	1 Coy, Bruneck – 2 Coy, Enneberg – 3 Coy, St.Leonhard/Abtei – 4 Coy, Buchenstein/Ampezzo
k.k. Standschützen Battalion, Glurns	1 Standschützen Company, – 2 Standschützen Company, – 3 Standschützen Company, – 4 Standschützen Company,
k.k. Standschützen Battalion, Gries	1 Coy, Gries – 2 Coy, Jenesien/Afing – 3 Coy, Terlan/Andrian/Vilpan/Mölten/Flaas
k.k. Standschützen Battalion, Gröden	1 Coy, St. Ulrich – 2 Coy, Wolkenstein – 3 Coy, St. Christina
k.k. Standschützen Battalion, Imst	1 Standschützen Company, – 2 Standschützen Company, – 3 Standschützen Company,
k.k. Standschützen Battalion, Innsbruck I	1 Coy, Innsbruck – 2 Coy, Innsbruck – 3 Coy, Innsbruck – 4 Coy, Innsbruck – 5 Coy, Hötting
k.k. Standschützen Battalion, Innsbruck II	1 Coy, Hall – 2 Coy, Stubaital – 3 Coy, Wipptal
k.k. Standschützen Battalion, Innsbruck III (Telfs)	1 Coy, Telfs – 2 Coy, Inzing
k.k. Standschützen Battalion, Kaltern I	1 Coy, Eppan – 2 Coy, Kaltern
k.k. Standschützen Battalion, Kaltern II	1 Coy, Margreid an der Weinstraße – 2 Coy, Kurtatsch – 3 Coy, Tramin
k.k. Standschützen Battalion No. II, Kastelruth	1 Coy, Kastelruth – 2 Coy, Seis am Schlern – 3 Coy, Völs – 4 Coy, Barbian
k.k. Standschützen Battalion, Kitzbühel	1 Coy, Kitzbühel – 2 Coy, Hopfgarten – 3 Coy, Brixen im Thale – 4 Coy, Fieberbrunn
k.k. Standschützen Battalion No. III, Klausen	1 Coy, Klausen/Villanders – 2 Coy, Feldthurns/Latzfons – 3 Coy, Lajen – 4 Coy, Gufidaun/Villnöss/Theis
k.k. Standschützen Battalion, Kufstein	1 Coy, Kufstein – 2 Coy, Ellmau/Scheffau – 3 Coy, Langkampfen/Kirchbichl – 4 Coy, Thiersee/Ebbs
k.k. Standschützen Battalion, Lana	1 Coy, Lana/Villanders – 2 Coy, Völlian/Tisens/Nals
k.k. Standschützen Battalion, Landeck	1 Coy, Landeck/Villanders – 2 Coy, Stanzertal – 3 Coy, Paznauntal
k.k. Standschützen Battalion, Lienz	1 Coy, Lienz/Villanders – 2 Coy, Nußdorf – 3 Coy, Matrei – 4 Coy, Huben
k.k. Standschützen Battalion No. X, Meran I	1 Coy, Meran/(main shooting range) – 2 Coy, Meran (reservists) – 3 Coy, Dorf Tirol – 4 Coy, Meran (veterans)
k.k. Standschützen Battalion No. VI, Meran II	1 Coy, Schenna/ Riffian /Tall – 2 Coy, Algund – 3 Coy, Partschins – 4 Coy, Naturns
k.k. Standschützen Battalion, Meran III	1 Coy, Obermais/ Untermais – 2 Coy, Marling/Tscherms – 3 Coy, Burgstall/Gargazon/Hafling/Vöran
k.k. Standschützen Battalion, Nauders-Ried	1 Coy, Ried – 2 Coy, Reschen – 3 Coy, Graun
k.k. Standschützen Battalion No. VII, Passeier	1 Coy, St. Martin – 2 Coy, St. Leonhard – 3 Coy, Moos – 4 Coy, Platt/Pfelders
k.k. Standschützen Battalion, Prad	1 Coy, Prad – 2 Coy, Laas – 3 Coy, Tschengls – 4 Coy, Lichtenberg
k.k. Standschützen Battalion, Rattenberg	1 Coy, Alpbach/Brixlegg – 2 Coy, Brandenberg
k.k. Standschützen Battalion, Reutte I	1 Coy, Reutte – 2 Coy, Berwang/Bichlbach – 3 Coy, Lermoos/Ehrwald
k.k. Standschützen Battalion, Reutte II	1 Coy, Steeg/Bach – 2 Coy, Häselgehr/Forchach – 3 Coy, Nesselwängle/Jungholz
k.k. Standschützen Battalion, Sarnthein	1 Coy, Sarnthein – 2 Coy, Pens
k.k. Standschützen Battalion, Schlanders	1 Coy, Schlanders – 2 Coy, Kortsch – 3 Coy, Martello – 4 Coy, Latsch – 5 Coy, Tartsch – 6 Coy, Kastelbell – 7 Coy, Tabland – 8 Coy, Schnals
k.k. Standschützen Battalion, Schwaz	1 Coy, Schwaz – 2 Coy, Jenbach
k.k. Standschützen Battalion, Sillian	1 Coy, Sillian – 2 Coy, Lesachtal – 3 Coy, Sexten – 4 Coy, Toblach
k.k. Standschützen Battalion, Silz	1 Coy, Silz – 2 Coy, Oetz – 3 Coy, Umhausen – 4 Coy, Haiming (Tirol)
k.k. Standschützen Battalion, Sterzing	1 Standschützen Company, – 2 Standschützen Company, – 3 Standschützen Company, – 4 Standschützen Company,
k.k. Standschützen Battalion, Ulten	1 Coy, St. Pankraz/ Pawigl – 2 Coy, St. Walburg/Proveis – 3 Coy, St. Nikolaus/St. Gertraud
k.k. Standschützen Battalion, Welsberg	1 Coy, Vintl – 2 Coy, Sand in Taufers – 3 Coy, Welsberg
k.k. Standschützen Battalion, Welschnofen	1 Coy, Welschnofen – 2 Coy, Tiers/Karneid – 3 Coy, Ritten/Rentsch – 4 Coy, St. Nikolaus in Eggen
k.k. Standschützen Battalion, Zillertal	1 Coy, Mayrhofen/Brandberg – 2 Coy, Mittleres Zillertal/Stumm
k.k. Standschützen Company	Stilfs
k.k. Standschützen Company	Taufers

=== Welschtirol ===
Battalions	Companies
k.k. Standschützen Battalion, Cavalese	1 Coy, Predazzo – 2 Coy, Cavalese – 3 Coy, Altrei – 4 Coy, Primör
k.k. Standschützen Battalion, Cles	1 Coy, Cles – 2 Coy, Taio – 3 Coy, Fondo – 4 Coy, Flavon – 5 Coy, Brez – 6 Coy, Proveis/Laurein
k.k. Standschützen Battalion, Malè	1 Coy, Rabbi – 2 Coy, Caldès – 3 Coy, Malè
k.k. Standschützen Battalion, Trient	

I.
- k.k. Standschützen Company, Ala (Trentino)-Pilcante
- k.k. Standschützen Formation, Baselga
- k.k. Standschützen Formation, Bedolo
- k.k. Standschützen Company, Borgo
- k.k. Standschützen Company, Brentonico
- k.k. Standschützen Formation, Caldonazzo
- k.k. Standschützen Company, Campitello
- k.k. Standschützen Formation, Carbonare
- k.k. Standschützen Formation, Castel Tesino
- k.k. Standschützen Formation, Cavedine
- k.k. Standschützen Formation, Cembra
- k.k. Standschützen Formation, Civezzano
- k.k. Standschützen Formation, Faedo
- k.k. Standschützen Formation, Fai
- k.k. Standschützen Formation, Folgaria-Sebastiano
- k.k. Standschützen Formation, Lasino
- k.k. Standschützen Formation, Lavis
- k.k. Standschützen Formation, Levico
- k.k. Standschützen Formation, Lusern
- k.k. Standschützen Company, Mezzolombardo
II.

- k.k. Standschützen Company, Moena
- k.k. Standschützen Formation, Nomi
- k.k. Standschützen Company, Pedemonte-Casotto
- k.k. Standschützen Formation, Pergine
- k.k. Standschützen Formation, Peive-Tesino
- k.k. Standschützen Company, Pozza
- k.k. Standschützen Section, Riva-Arco (Trentino)
- k.k. Standschützen Formation, Rovere della Luna
- k.k. Standschützen Formation, Sardagna
- k.k. Standschützen Formation, Segonzano
- k.k. Standschützen Formation, Spormaggiore
- k.k. Standschützen Company, Strigno
- k.k. Standschützen Company, Tione
- k.k. Standschützen Formation, Trambileno
- k.k. Standschützen Company, Vallarsa
- k.k. Standschützen Formation, Wezzano
- k.k. Standschützen Formation, Vigo di Non
- k.k. Standschützen Formation, Vigolo-Vattaro
- k.k. South Tyrol Standschützen-Arbeiter Company,
- k.k. Weinberg Work Detail (Arbeitskommando) of the 11th AK

=== Vorarlberg ===
Battalions	Companies
k.k. Standschützen Battalion, Bezau	1 Coy, Bezau – 2 Coy, Mittelberg – 3 Coy, Lingenau/Hittisau
k.k. Standschützen Battalion, Bludenz	1 Coy, Walgau – 2 Coy, Klostertal – 3 Coy, Montafon
k.k. Standschützen Battalion, Bregenz	1 Coy, Bregenz – 2 Coy, Wolfurt/Kennelbach/Hard – 3 Coy, Sulzberg – 4 Coy, Alberschwende
k.k. Standschützen Battalion, Dornbirn	1 Coy, Dornbirn – 2 Coy, Lustenau – 3 Coy, Hohenems – 4 Coy, Höchst/Fußach
k.k. Standschützen Battalion No. 4, Feldkirch	1 Coy, Feldkirch – 2 Coy, Frastanz – 3 Coy, Altenstadt/Gisingen
k.k. Standschützen Battalion, Rankweil	1 Coy, Rankweil – 2 Coy, Götzis – 3 Coy, Sulz/Röthis

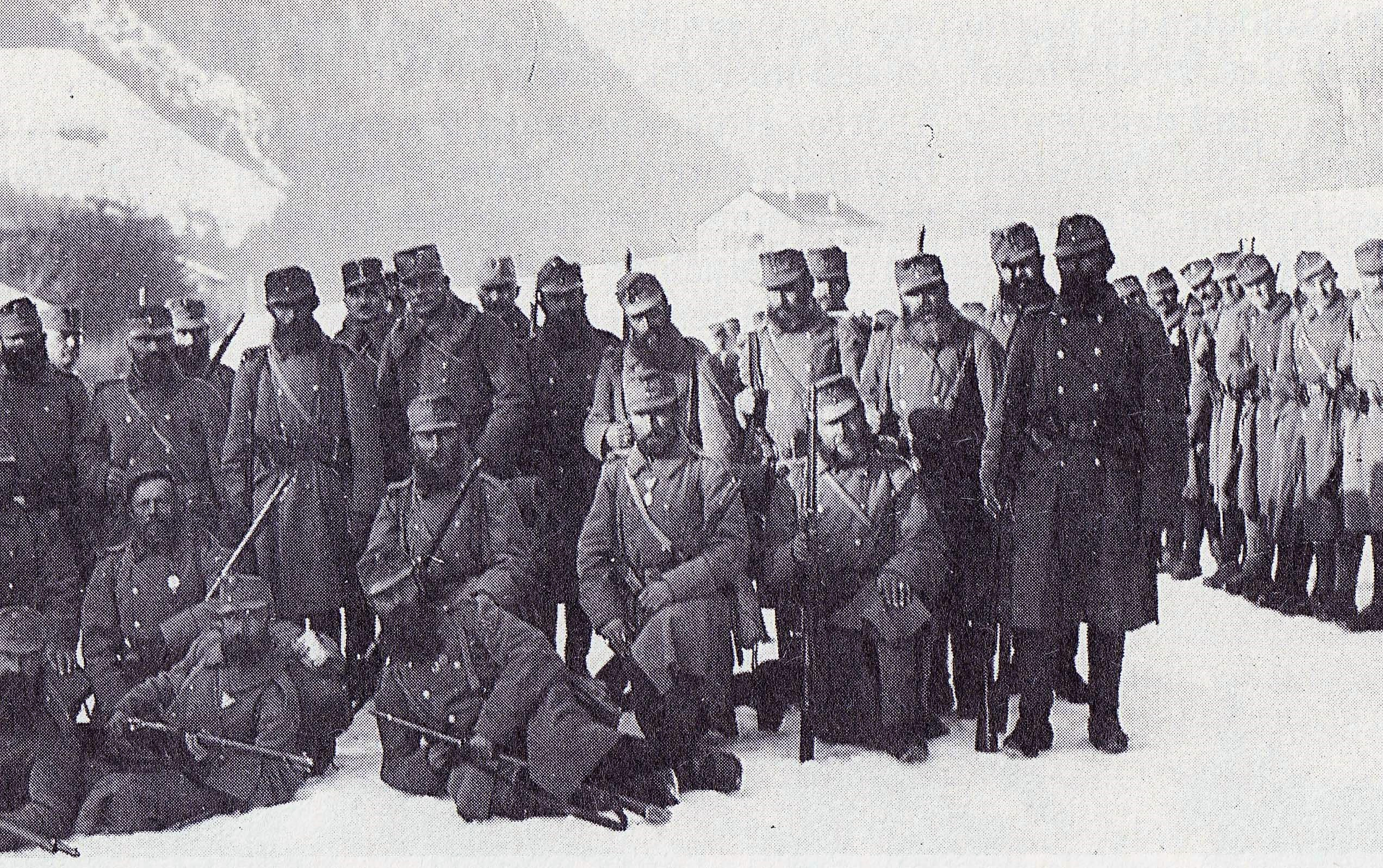
Standschützen from Enneberg with their CO, Major Kostner

== First World War ==
=== Preparation and mobilization ===
At the beginning of the First World War, the three regiments of Landesschützen were transferred to the Russian front, although, according to the letter of the law, they should only have been used to defend the Tyrol. As a result, in Tyrol, the only trained troops available to protect the border with Italy were two fully effective battalions (No. X march battalion of the 59th Infantry (K.u.k. Salzburgisch-Oberösterreichisches Infanterie-Regiment „Erzherzog Rainer" Nr. 59) and the Tyrolean Ist Landsturm Battalion. A further 19 battalions were only partially effective. The Tyrol defence command soon began to distrust "neutral" Italy.

Since the Standschützen, who were liable to call-up, had already been mobilized and were no longer available, the remaining, non-liable Standschützen were rapidly trained in military skills.

These included, for example, disabled or otherwise discharged Kaiserjäger or Landesschützen riflemen. Training took place in the national costume or shooting jackets; in addition the men had to furnish their own hunting rifles. Their initial tasks involved guard duties at military installations and on bridges or the like. Since no uniforms were available, black and yellow armbands were made. Training was not easy. In particular, the younger conscripts, who had not yet received any regular military training, but also the elderly, who had not done any military service for decades, gave their leaders headaches. The youngest rifleman was just 14 years old; (Note: and Standschützen under 17 years old were only allowed in to be employed on duties in the rear area.) the oldest was over 80. Because of these deficiencies, many serving officers did not take the Standschützen seriously for a long time, and often patronized or even insulted them. This was not surprising, because suddenly people were appointed as majors, in an instant, as it were, whereas a normal officer only attained this rank after serving about 15 years. A captain with ten or more years of service suddenly found himself facing a Standschützen major, who had only been a lance corporal or corporal when on active military service or who even had no military service at all. This inevitably caused tension. The commander in chief in Tyrol, Feldmarschalleutnant Dankl, issued an order in November 1915 that insults and improper treatment of Standschützen officers would be severely punished.

In April, the Standschützen units were inspected for the first time. In the wake of this inspection, the Standschützen were divided into those capable of service at the front (thus considered field formations) and those of lower capability (deployed on guarding duties or used as replacements). It was expected that Italy would declare war on Austria-Hungary. For this reason the Standschützen were mobilized on 18 May 1915. Only a day later, the first formations in South Tyrol advanced to the southern front. Another three days later trains arrived at the new front, having crossed the Brenner Pass, carrying North Tyrolese Standschützen. Italy finally declared war on Austria-Hungary on 23 May.

=== Welsch Tyrolese Standschützen ===
The Imperial and Royal leadership of the Army were uneasy about members of the Standschützen units in Trentino. Although the Schießstände had existed for a long time, they were mistrustful of the Italian-speaking Tyrolese and attempted to classify them according to their reliabity. The classification ranged from "fully reliable" to "completely unreliable". Weapons and uniforms were only issued to the Welsch Tyrolese Standschützen that were absolutely reliable units; even so they were only deployed in combat on a few occasions. In most cases they were assigned to guard duties or used as porters, or were divided into work details.

=== Equipment ===
Until the end of March 1915, no military clothing or weapons had even been envisaged for the Standschützen, much less made available or issued. But after it became increasingly evident that Italy would enter the war on the side of the Entente, the formation of Standschützen units, which had started in the January, began to accelerate. Initially they were issued with whatever uniforms could be found. On 23 May 1915, the two companies of the Schwaz battalion, for example, drew pike gray parade uniforms of the pattern designed for the Jägertruppe.

Mannlicher repeating rifles were initially either unavailable or only available in small numbers so, to begin with, the Standschützen were issued with old, single-shot Werndl rifles or forced to use their own weapons. In May 1915, the North Tyrol and Vorarlberg Standschützen received 16,000 Model 98 guns from German sources; at that time the South Tyrolean units were still only armed with Mannlicher rifles. The Welsch Tyrolese units kept their Werndl guns; only a few units, assigned to combat missions, were given Model 98s. Schwarzlose machine guns were allocated to individual units when needed and, where they had good relations, like the Bolzano battalion, were even given their own machine gun sections. The Standschützen had no artillery; only the Schlanders battalion had a very old 6-inch mountain gun of unknown origin.

After some initial difficulties, the Standschützen were issued with mountain infantry uniform. (Note: Montur is the Austrian word for working dress or uniform) The sudden effort made to do this stemmed from fears that non-uniformed combatants might be treated as guerrillas. Nevertheless, significant deficiencies in the quality of equipment remained. For example, instead of sashes (Riemenzeug), web belt material (Webgurtmaterial) was issued. There were no bread bags or spades – both were initially fashioned or improvised out of anything possible.

As a badge, troops wore the Tyrolean eagle of Tyrolese units on grass green gorgets. The Vorarlberg troops wore the Vorarlberg coat of arms. On the left side of the cap, the edelweiss of the mountain infantry could be attached. The front of the cap itself was specially designed for the additional badge with the slogan "Hands off Tyrol" (Hände weg von Tirol). The celluloid stars of the regular army were used as rank badges for non-commissioned officers and men, instead of the envisaged silver embroidered rosettes. The difficulties of ordering the latter in large quantities meant that they could only be issued to the officers.

The rescue equipment of the Alpine huts in the mountains were made to serve as medical facilities. Their equipment and medical stores were emptied out, packed onto wooden frames and assigned to the battalions. Each battalion was given two medicine and two bandage knapsacks.

Units were intended to have standards, but the only ones to receive them were the battalions at Bolzano, Kaltern, Passeier and Merano II. Many of the other units flew their club standards for the swearing-in ceremonies and march off parades.

=== Deployment ===
Following the mobilization order issued by Emperor Franz Joseph I on Tue 18 May 1915, 39 German Tyrolese rifle battalions and 2 independent rifle companies, 6 Vorarlberg battalions, 4 Welsch Tyrolese battalions and 41 Welsch Tyrolese rifle companies were formed.

On 22 May 1915, one day before Italy declared war, the Standschützen deployed to protect the frontier in the south and southwest. The only exceptions were the Zillertal and Nauders-Ried battalions, which remained to protect the main chain of the Alps, and the Lienz battalion, which was initially deployed to protect the East Tyrolean border south of the River Drau and remained there until September 1915.

=== Operational theatre and operations ===
The operational theatre of the Standschützen covered all five districts of the South Tyrolean front. It stretched from the Dreisprachenspitze mountain on the Swiss border to the eastern foothills of the Carnic Alps at the Kreuzberg Saddle.

Although the Standschützen were used almost exclusively to defend the Tyrol against the frequent Italian attacks, they also participated in attacks against Italy. In addition to trench warfare they also conducted patrols and reconnaissance operations. Their other main task was in the construction and repair of defensive works: they built defensive positions, accommodation, caverns and barbed wire barriers, and assisted in repairing damaged fortifications. They were also used to transport supplies, as stretcher bearers and on guard duties.

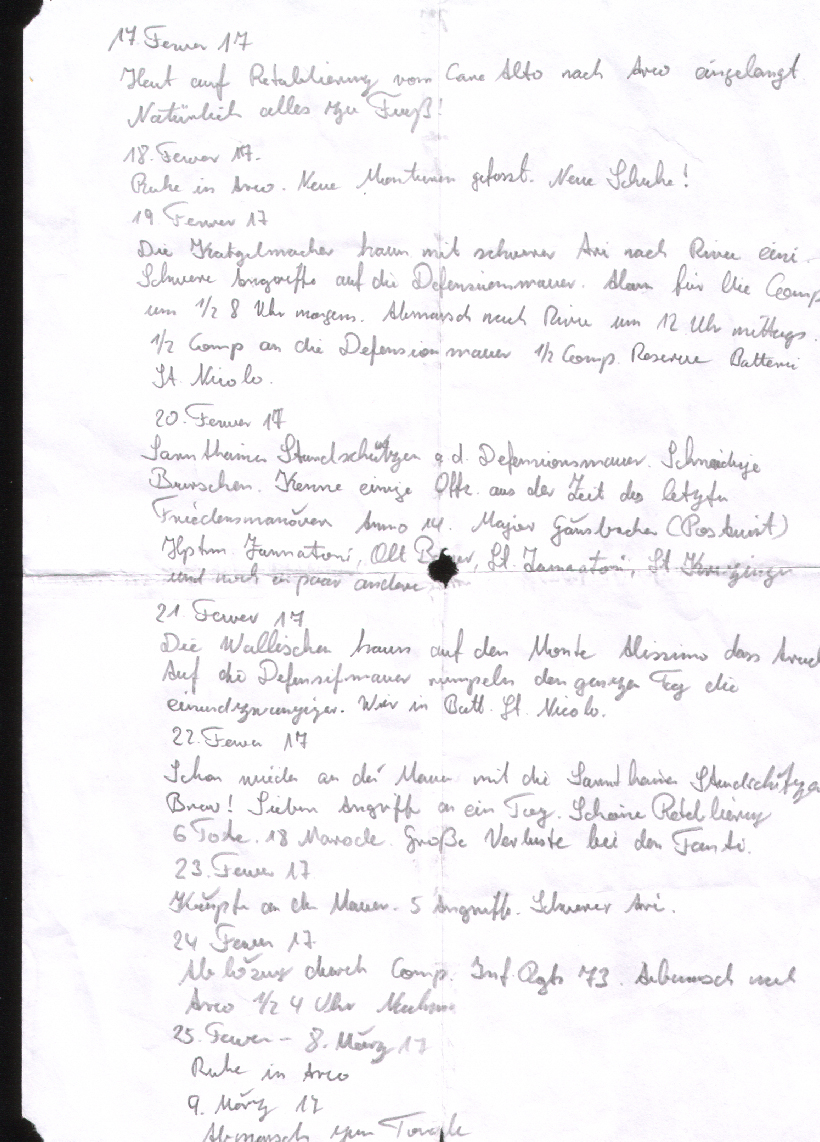
Mention of the Sarnthein Standschützen in the war diary of Zugsführer Franz Pomykahler of the IIIrd Innichen Rifles in 1917

In the early weeks the Standschützen were asked to defend the Tyrolean front on their own. Despite that, these weak forces were sufficient to withstand the Italian attacks, as the Italian leadership could not believe that the border stood virtually unprotected. Only later did regular troops and soldiers of the German Alpine Corps, the Kaiserschützen and Kaiserjäger arrive. Unlike many other officers, they recognized the Standschützen as proper soldiers. The Austrian war strategists described the Standschützen initially as "a disorderly mob with no experience of war." However, by their courage, marksmanship and mountaineering skills, the Standschützen soon acquired respect and esteem.

=== Summary ===
There is no doubt that the use of the Standschützen saved Austria-Hungary at that stage of the war in May 1915. There were only 12,000 regular troops available, which theoretically meant that a man with a rifle could only be stationed every 30 metres. Thus the 23,000 Standschützen men under arms, at two-thirds of the total available strength, formed the backbone of the defensive line. The German Alpine Corps could initially only intervene in a limited way, because Germany was not yet at war with Italy at that time and German troops were not allowed to enter Italian soil.

Thanks especially to the excellent local knowledge of the Standschützen, they were often able to intercept Italian patrols and reconnaissance companies and repulse them. In particular, since the correct uniforms had now been issued, the impression was given that they constituted regular forces, which may have influenced the reluctance of the Italian commanders. The moral value of the Standschützen lay in the fact his property and his family were often not far behind the front and had to be protected. The purely military value of Standschützen formations was highly variable. The proverbial obstinacy and stubbornness, particularly amongst the miners, often led to indiscipline and high-handedness. For example, Feldmarschalleutnant Goiginger reported on 12 June 1915 to Innsbruck that the Monte Piano Standschützen "had left the battle without authorization." However, such incidents were not common and restricted to isolated cases. To strengthen military discipline, active duty army officers began to be appointed as commanders to the Standschützen. Furthermore, after the manning situation had eased with the arrival of troops from the Eastern Front, work began to train the Standschützen and strengthen them militarily. Officers and men were sent off on various training courses to learn the latest tactics and techniques. At the suggestion of the German Alpine Corps, regular units were inserted into sections of the front that had previously been held by the Standschützen alone. In this way, a kind of "corset" was formed that further strengthened the combat power available.

== Rank badges of the Standschützen (examples) ==
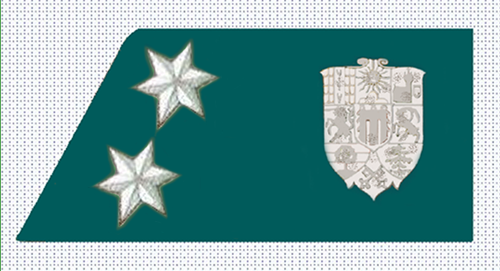
Unterjäger
(Corporal)
Vorarlberg

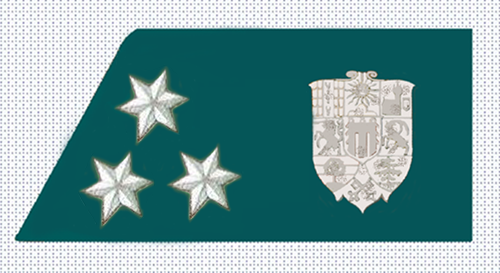
Zugsführer
(Master Cpl or L/Sergeant)
Vorarlberg

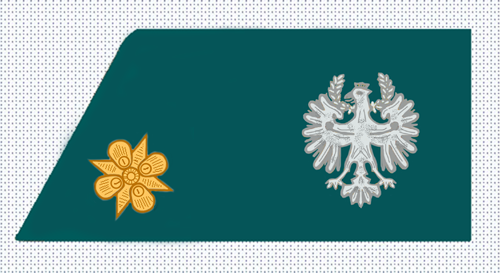
Leutnant
(2nd lieutenant)
Tyrol

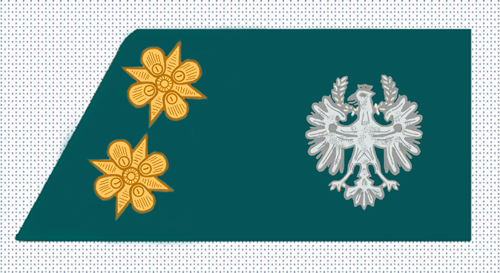
Oberleutnant
(Lieutenant)
Tyrol

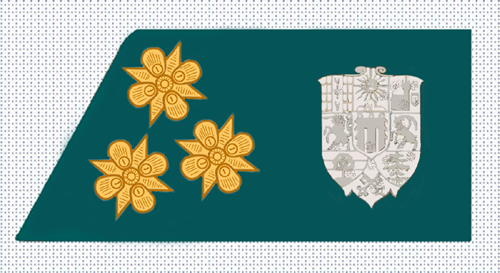
Hauptmann
(Captain)
Vorarlberg

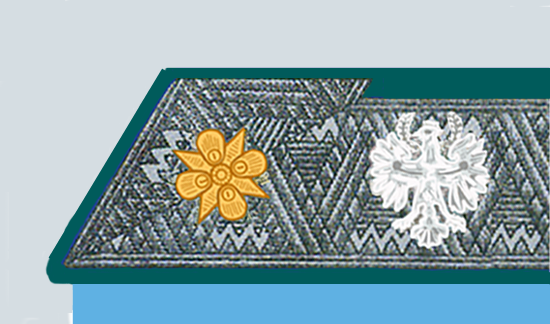
Major
(Major)
Tyrol

== Literature ==
- Jahrbuch der Kaiserschützen, Tiroler Standschützen und Tiroler Landstürmer. (published: 1924–1925). Wagner, Innsbruck, ZDB-ID 555983-2.
- Rudolf Huchler: Das Standschützen-Bataillon Dornbirn im Weltkriege. Verlag des Verfassers, Höchst 1927. (Online at ALO).
- Fritz Weiser (Red.), Kaiserschützenbund für Österreich (pub.): Kaiserschützen, Tiroler-Vorarlberger Landsturm und Standschützen. Göth, Vienna, 1933.
- Karl Kelz: Die Standschützen des Gerichtsbezirkes Feldkirch im Weltkrieg 1914–1918. Mit einem Anhang heimatgeschichtlicher Erinnerungen. Graff’sche Buchdruckerei, Feldkirch, 1934. (Online bei ALO).
- Anton von Mörl: Standschützen verteidigen Tirol 1915–1918. Universitätsverlag Wagner, Innsbruck, 1958 (Schlern-Schriften. 185, ZDB-ID 503740-2).
- Bernhard Wurzer: Tirols Heldenzeit vor 150 Jahren.--> Tyrolia-Verlag, Innsbruck (u. a.) 1959.
- Benedikt Bilgeri: Die Landesverteidigung. Zur Erinnerung an den Ausmarsch der Vorarlberger Standschützen vor 50 Jahren. Teutsch, Bregenz, 1965.
- Oswald Gschließer, Erich Egg: Tiroler Standschützen. Vierhundert Jahre Landesverteidigung in Tirol. Ausstellung im Gedenken an den Auszug der Tiroler Standschützen zu Pfingsten 1915, Juni bis September 1965. Tiroler Landesmuseum Ferdinandeum, Innsbruck, 1965.
- Helmut Golowitsch: „Und kommt der Feind ins Land herein …“ Schützen verteidigen Tirol und Kärnten. Standschützen und Freiwillige Schützen 1915–1918. „Buchdienst Südtirol“ Kienesberger, Nürnberg 1985, ISBN 3-923995-05-9 (Schriftenreihe zur Zeitgeschichte Tirols. 6, ZDB-ID 1068770-1).
- Rolando Cembran: „Baon Auer“. Die Odyssee des Standschützen-Bataillons „Auer“ No. IX (1915–1918). Manfrini, Calliano (Trentino), 1993, ISBN 88-7024-483-0.
- Heinz Tiefenbrunner, Südtiroler Schützenbund Bezirk Süd-Tiroler Unterland (publ.): Standschützen Bataillon Kaltern 1915–1918. Aus dem Kriegstagebuch des Major Johann Nepomuk Baron Di Pauli. Verlagsanstalt Athesia, Bolzano, 1996, ISBN 88-7014-865-3.
- Oswald Kaufmann (Hrsg.): Meine Kriegs-Chronik. Mit dem Standschützenbataillon Bezau in Südtirol und Albanien. 1. Weltkrieg, Kriegsgefangenschaft, Wirtschaftskrise und Inflation 1914–1925. 2. Auflage. Gesellschaft Vorarlberger Militärmuseum, Bregenz, 1997.
- Wolfgang Joly: Standschützen. Die Tiroler und Vorarlberger k.k. Standschützen-Formationen im Ersten Weltkrieg. Organisation und Einsatz. Universitätsverlag Wagner, Innsbruck, 1998, ISBN 3-7030-0310-3 (Schlern-Schriften. 303).
