= Eisacktal =

Coordinates: 46.72°N 11.67°E

- District
- Comunità comprensoriale Valle Isarco; Bezirksgemeinschaft Eisacktal
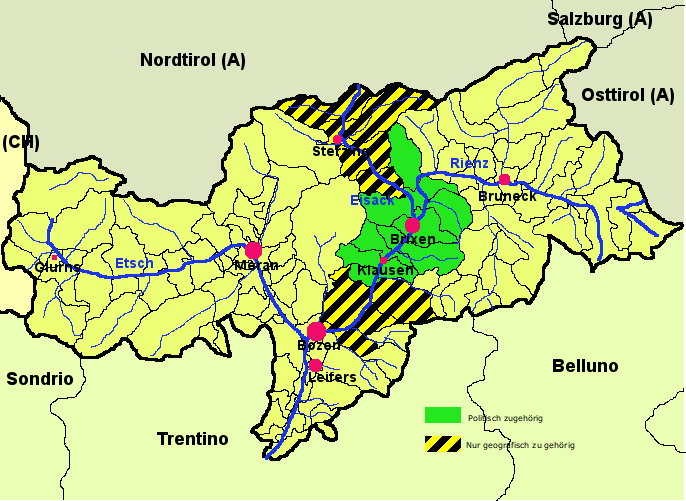
- Eisacktal (highlighted in green) within South Tyrol; the yellow-black stripes mark the geographical extent of the valley
- Country: Italy
- Autonomous region: Trentino-Alto Adige
- Autonomous province: South Tyrol
- Established: 1968
- Administrative seat: Brixen (Bressanone)

Area
  - Total: 624 km^{2} (241 sq mi)

Population (2005)
  - Total: 47,492
  - Density: 76.1/km^{2} (197/sq mi)
- Website: www.bzgeisacktal.it

Eisack Valley (Italian: Valle Isarco [ˈvalle iˈzarko]; German: Eisacktal) is a district (Italian: comprensorio; German: Bezirksgemeinschaft) in South Tyrol, Italy. It comprises the middle part of the valley of the Eisack, from Franzensfeste in the north to Waidbruck in the south.

== Overview ==
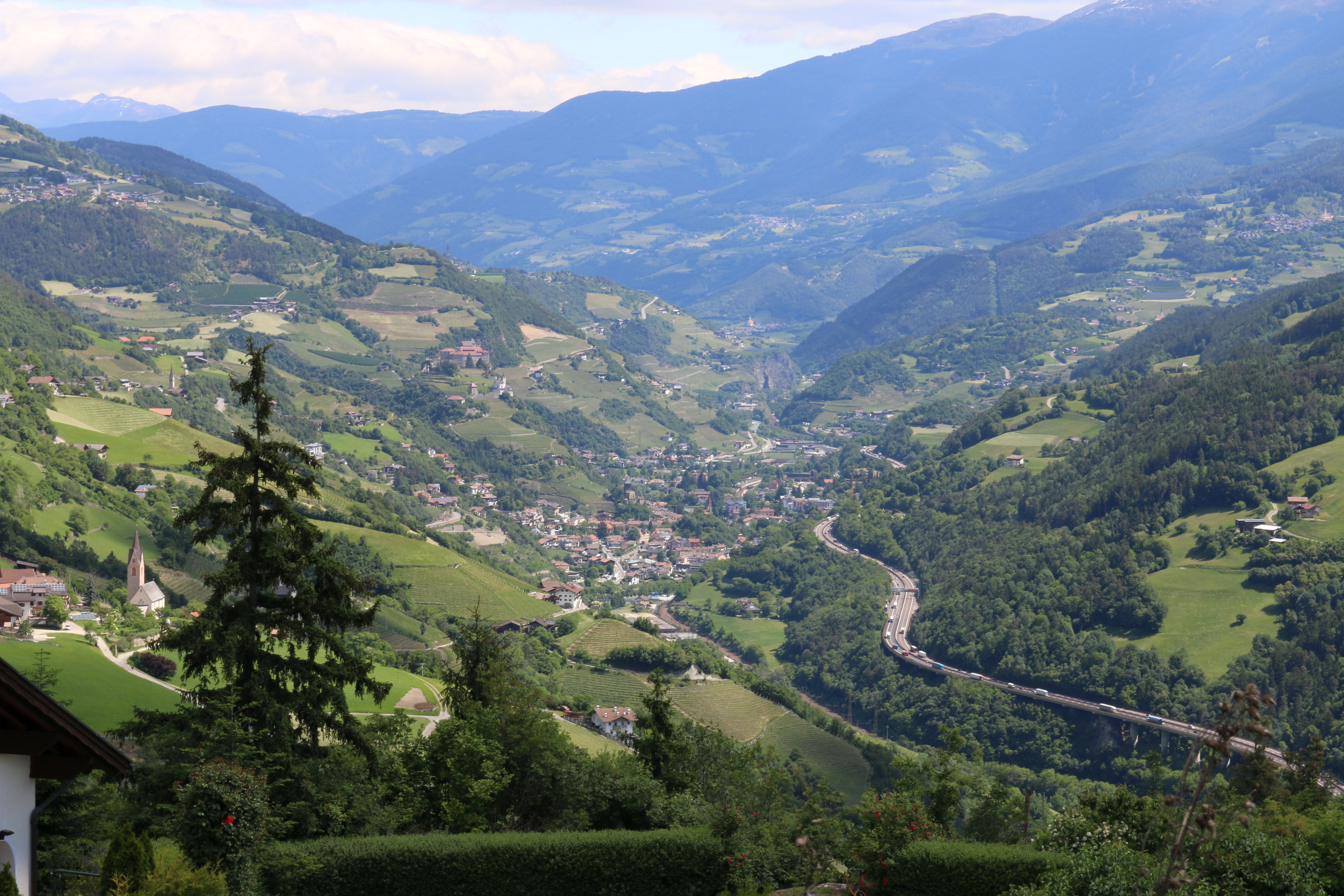
View from Barbian to Klausen

The valley of the Eisack river stretches from Brenner Pass southwards down to its confluence with the Adige near Bolzano. The upper valley north of Franzensfeste is known as Wipptal, while the lower parts belong to the Salten-Schlern administrative district. The valley is part of a major transport route across the eastern Alps, traversed by the Autostrada A22 (part of the European route E45) and the parallel Brenner Railway line.

According to the 2001 census, 85.76% of the population of the valley speak German, 13.22% Italian and 1.02% Ladin as first language.

== Subdivision ==
The following municipalities are part of the Eisacktal district:

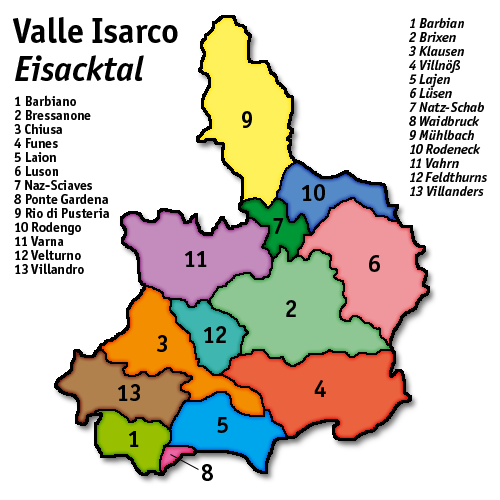
Eisacktal municipalities

- Barbian
- Brixen (district capital)
- Feldthurns
- Klausen
- Lajen
- Lüsen
- Mühlbach
- Natz-Schabs
- Rodeneck
- Vahrn
- Villanders
- Villnöß
- Waidbruck
