= Salten-Schlern =

Coordinates: 46.6°N 11.5°E

- District
- Comunità comprensoriale Salto-Sciliar; Bezirksgemeinschaft Salten-Schlern
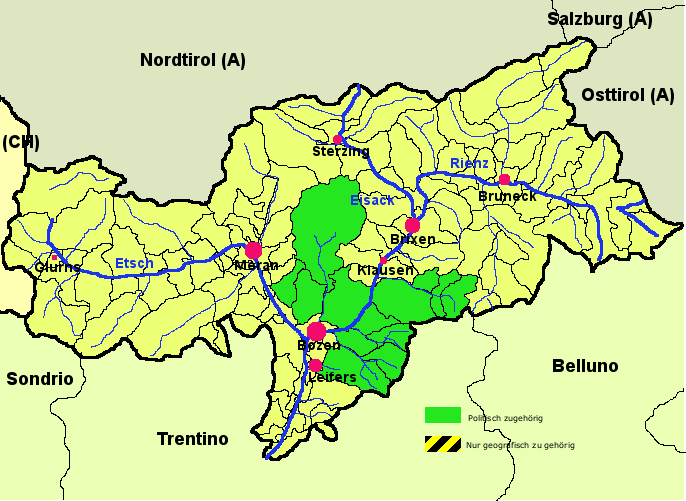
- Salten-Schlern district (highlighted in green) within South Tyrol
- Country: Italy
- Autonomous region: Trentino-Alto Adige
- Autonomous province: South Tyrol
- Established: 1973
- Administrative seat: Bolzano

Area
  - Total: 1,037 km^{2} (400 sq mi)

Population (2013)
  - Total: 48,286
  - Density: 46.56/km^{2} (120.6/sq mi)
- Website: www.ccsaltosciliar.it

Salten-Schlern (Italian: Salto-Sciliar [ˈsalto ʃʃiˈljar], German: Salten-Schlern) is a district (Italian: comprensorio; German: Bezirksgemeinschaft) in South Tyrol, Italy. It comprises the lower part of the valley of the Eisack River, from Waidbruck to Bolzano. It is named after the Salten plateau and the mountain Schlern. The seat of the district is in Bolzano, itself not part of the district.

== Overview ==
According to the 2001 census, 77.15% of the population of the district speak German, 18.82% Ladin and 4.03% Italian as mother language.

The following municipalities are part of the Salten-Schlern district:

- Deutschnofen
- Jenesien
- Karneid
- Kastelruth
- Mölten
- Ritten
- Santa Cristina Gherdëina
- Sarntal
- Sëlva
- Tiers
- Urtijëi
- Völs am Schlern
- Welschnofen

The capital, Bolzano, is administratively separated from the district.
