= Theodor Kofler =

Austrian photographer

Theodor Kofler (Innsbruck, 27 July 1877 – Bukoba, October 1957) was an Austrian photographer. Moving to Egypt in the early 1900s, he took the first known photos of the Pyramids from an airplane in 1914.

== Biography ==
Theodor Kofler was born in Innsbruck in 1877 as the fourth of seven brothers. His father, Franz Kofler, was originally from Sand in Taufers and had moved to Innsbruck where he married Theodore's mother, Kreszenz Egger.

In 1883 Kreszenz died, shortly after the last birth, and two years later his father remarried Antonia Graziadei, with whom he had four other children.

In 1898 Theodor was judged suitable for the Army and included in the Tyrolean Standschützen, Third Regiment stationed in Trento, but shortly after, in 1903, he immediately left for Egypt for Cairo.

It is not known if he was already a photographer before his departure, but when he arrived in Cairo at the beginning he collaborated with two photographers, Edelstein and Paul, and then bought a photographic studio in 1908: Cairo Studio.

In 1904 he married his wife Elvira, with whom he had two children: Stephanie and Wilhelm Kofler.

In 1914 he took the 21 photos which ended up in an album purchased by Alexandre Varille between 1931 and 1935. These photos are taken from Marc Bonnier's plane (the photos of the Giza Plateau date back to a period between 2 and January 12, 1914) and Louis Olivier (Karnak, Luxor and Thebes), before the latter destroyed his airplane in an accident.

On August 12, 1914, Great Britain declared war on Austria and the British colonial government deported the Austrians forced to conscript near Alexandria or Malta: it was on the island of Malta that Kofler was deported and where he became the photographer of the prisoners, who, according to Theodor's photographs, were not in deplorable living conditions, even if it is taken into account the social status to which Kofler's subjects belonged.

In April 1916 he was released and returned to Egypt at the end of the month. In 1917 his father, Franz Kolfer, died, but because of the war, Theodor was unable to attend his funeral.

In 1922 he obtained Austrian citizenship, since his father was Italian, while his mother was originally from Innsbruck. After 1914 Kofler had stopped devoting himself to archaeological photography, but he often worked for the press or held services for weddings and even schools.

In 1942, during the Second World War, the British deported the former Austrians to Palestine, then to South Africa, and then Kenya, where Wilhelm himself was to be found. Here he made a career in the most prestigious hotels and married Ursula Rose Sachs.

In 1952, before the Egyptian revolution, Kofler and his wife left for France, then turned to Kenya by their son and then moved to Lake Victoria in Tanzania. Here Elvira died in 1955, followed three years later by her husband.
