= Ritten =

- Comune
- Gemeinde Ritten; Comune di Renon
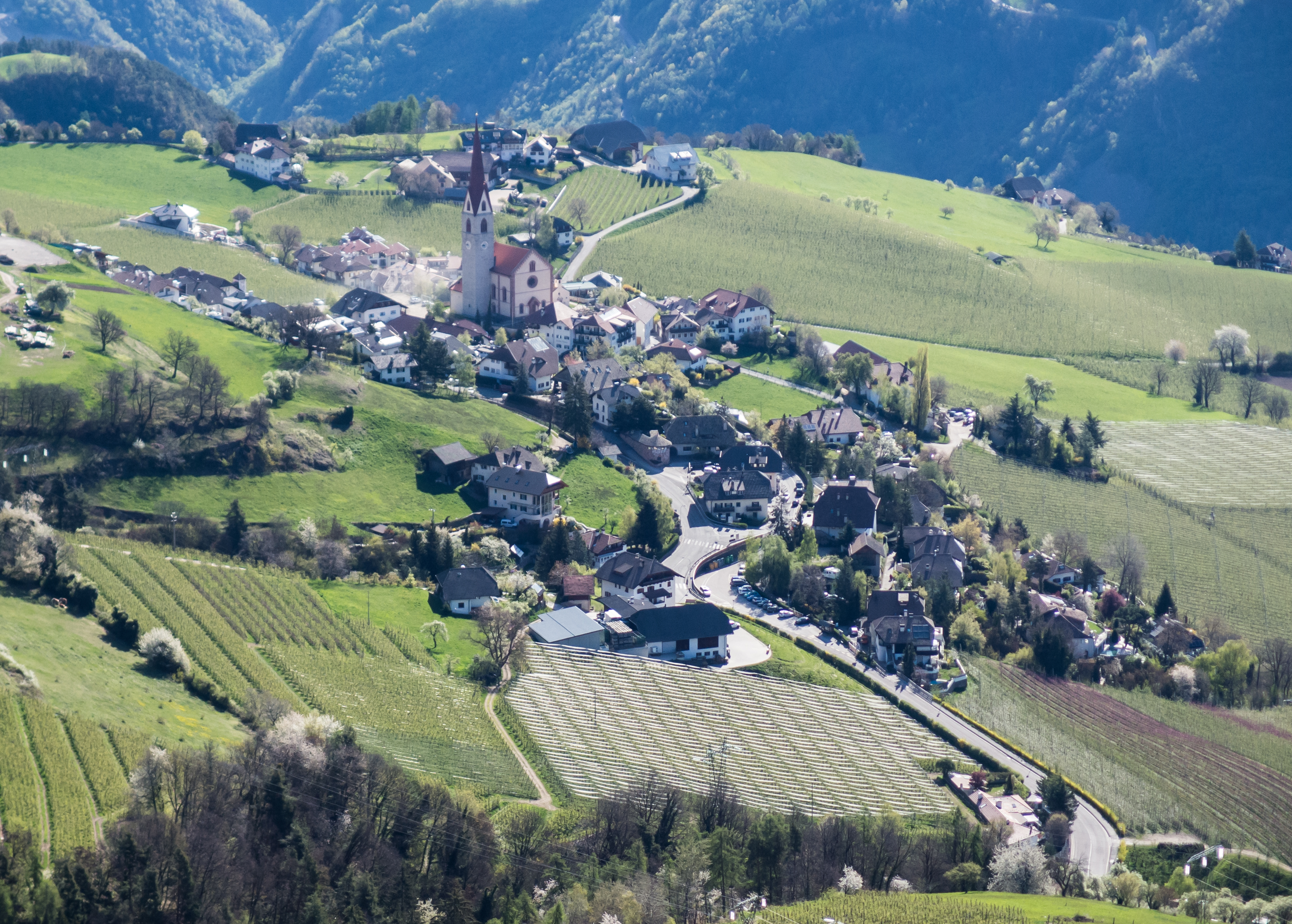
- The village of Unterinn in Ritten

- Coat of arms

- Location within Italy Location within Trentino-Alto Adige/Südtirol
- Coordinates: 46°32′N 11°27′E
- Country: Italy
- Region: Trentino-Alto Adige/Südtirol
- Province: South Tyrol (BZ)
- Frazioni: Oberinn (Auna di Sopra), Unterinn (Auna di Sotto), Atzwang (Campodazzo), Klobenstein (Collalbo), Lengmoos (Longomoso), Lengstein (Longostagno), Gissmann (Madonnina), Mittelberg (Monte di Mezzo), Rotwand (Pietrarossa), Oberbozen (Soprabolzano), Signat (Signato), Sill, Wangen (Vanga)

Government
  - Mayor: Julia Fulterer

Area
  - Total: 111 km^{2} (43 sq mi)
- Elevation: 1,154 m (3,786 ft)

Population (Aug. 2018)
  - Total: 7,925
  - Density: 71.4/km^{2} (185/sq mi)
- Demonym(s): German: Rittner; Italian: renonesi
- Time zone: UTC+1 (CET)
  - Summer (DST): UTC+2 (CEST)
- Postal code: 39054
- Dialing code: 0471
- Website: Official website

Ritten (German pronunciation: [ˈrɪtn̩]; Italian: Renon [reˈnon]) is a comune (municipality) in South Tyrol in northern Italy.

== Territory ==
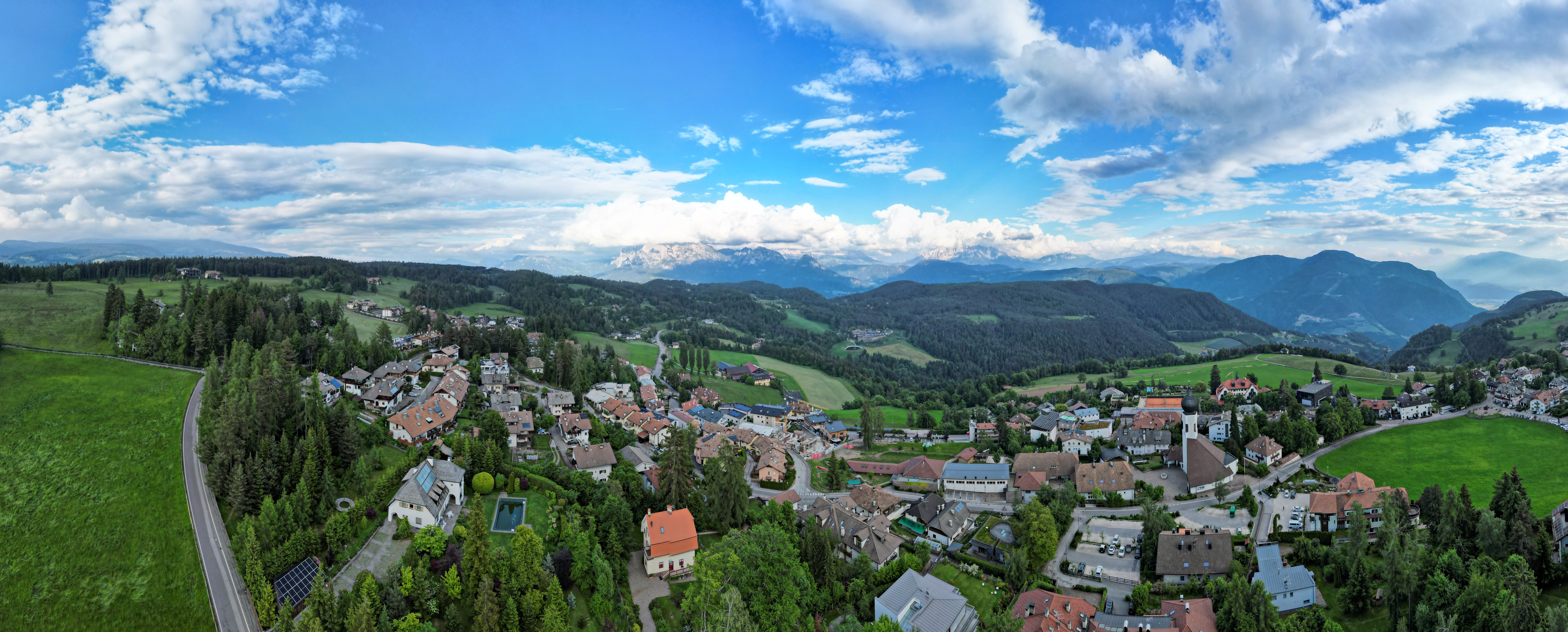
Dolomites from the perspective of Ritten in South Tyrol

The 111-square-kilometre (43 mi^{2}) community is named after the high plateau, elevation 1,100 to 1,400 metres (3,600 to 4,600 ft), the Ritten or the Renon, on which most of the villages are located. The plateau forms the southeast tip of the Sarntal Alps mountain range and is located between, and on average 800 metres (2,600 ft) above the rivers Eisack and Talfer. Ritten lies directly northeast of Bolzano, settled on the "meeting point" of the above rivers.

Ritten borders the following municipalities: Barbian, Bolzano, Kastelruth, Karneid, Völs, Jenesien, Sarntal and Villanders.

As of 31 December 2016, Ritten had a population of 7,847.

There are 17 fraziones (subdivisions, usually consisting of one or a few villages and hamlets). These include the central village Klobenstein (Collalbo), in which the townhall is located, as well as Atzwang (Campodazzo), Gissmann (Madonnina), Lengmoos (Longomoso), Lengstein (Longostagno), Mittelberg (Monte di Mezzo), Oberbozen (Soprabolzano), Oberinn (Auna di Sopra), Rotwand (Pietrarossa), Siffian (Siffiano), Signat (Signato), Sill (Castel Novale), Unterinn (Auna di Sotto), Wangen (Vanga), and Wolfsgruben (Costalovara).

Of these only Atzwang and Sill are not located on the plateau, but on the rivers Eisack and Talfer, respectively.

== History ==
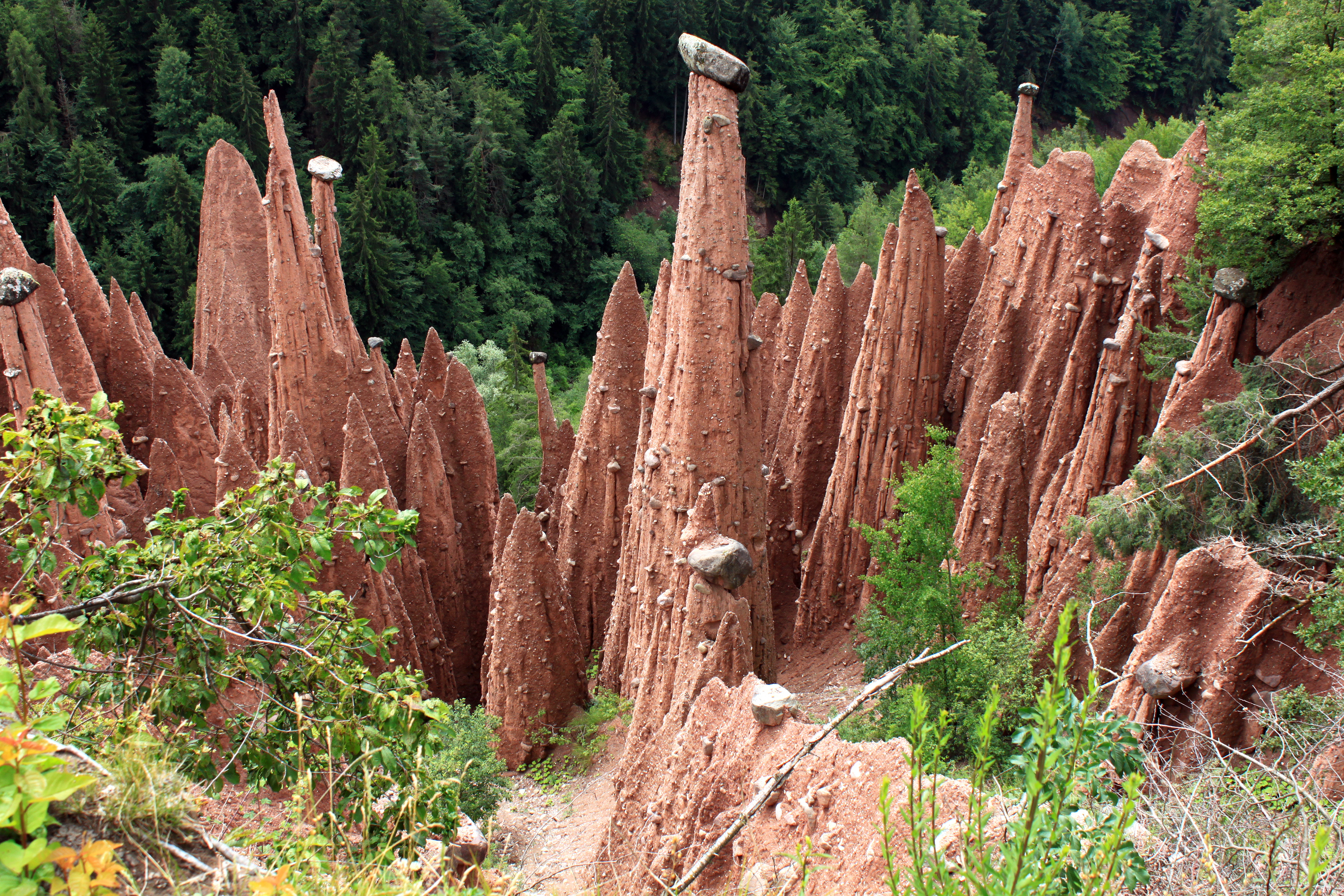
Earth pyramids in Ritten

The mountain ridge is first mentioned in AD 871–75 as "Mons Ritanus" and then in 1027 as "Mons Rittena". Already around 1200 a mountain inn was established on the plateau. In 1237 Runkelstein Castle was built on a rocky spur in Ritten territory by the lords of Wangen.

The Tyrolean patriotic hero Peter Mayr (1767–1810), involved in the rebellion against Napoleon's forces that occupied Tyrol, was born in the village of Siffian in Ritten.

From the 17th century Ritten has been a popular summer destination for citizens of Bolzano, since the air is considerably cooler on the plateau. Ritten is connected with Bolzano with a provincial road and with a cableway from Oberbozen, one of the longest cableways of the world in one track, about 4 kilometres (2.5 mi) long and 12 minutes to travel. In 1960, this cableway replaced the previous rack railway, built in 1907. The railway is still in function on the mountain side between Maria Himmelfahrt and Klobenstein.

=== Coat of arms ===
The official community coat of arms consists of gules two chevrons embowed argent; it is the arms of the Lords of Zwingenstein who ruled the village from their castle until 1531. The emblem was adopted in 1967.

== Main sights ==
- Near Oberbozen and Lengstein are several groups of fairy chimneys (earth pyramids).
- Klobenstein has a 1,198-metre (3,930 ft) high-elevation outdoor artificial ice track, the Arena Ritten or Ritten Kunsteisbahn, at which the 2007 and 2011 European Speed Skating Championships and many World Cup events have been held.

== Economy ==
The candy company Loacker is based in Ritten.

== Notable people ==
- Frederick von Wangen, bishop of Trento, early 13th century
- Bruno Platter (born 1944) a Roman Catholic priest and the 65th Grand Master of the Teutonic Order

== Society ==
=== Linguistic distribution ===
According to the 2024 census, 94.35% of the population speak German, 5.35% Italian and 0.30% Ladin as first language.

=== Demographic evolution ===
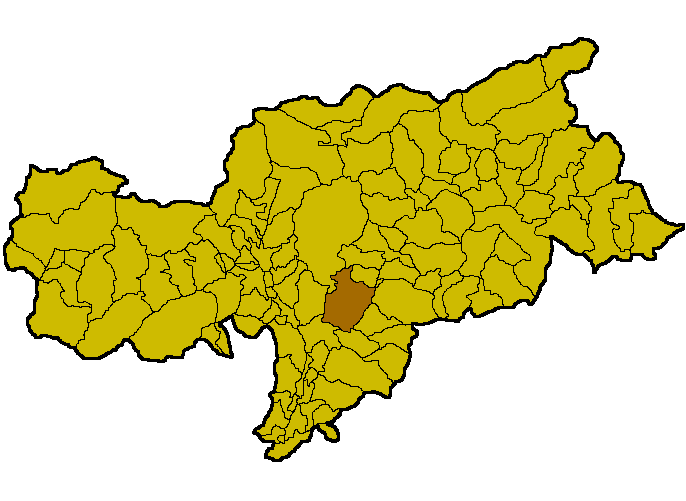
Location of Ritten within South Tyrol

Historical population

Year	Pop.	±%
1860	?	—
1870	?	—
1880	4,209	—
1900	?	—
1910	4,214	—

Year	Pop.	±%
1921	4,293	+1.9%
1931	4,688	+9.2%
1936	4,949	+5.6%
1951	4,900	−1.0%
1961	4,750	−3.1%

Year	Pop.	±%
1971	4,845	+2.0%
1981	5,391	+11.3%
1991	6,101	+13.2%
2001	6,993	+14.6%

Source: Data from ISTAT
