= Eisack =

Eisack/Isarco
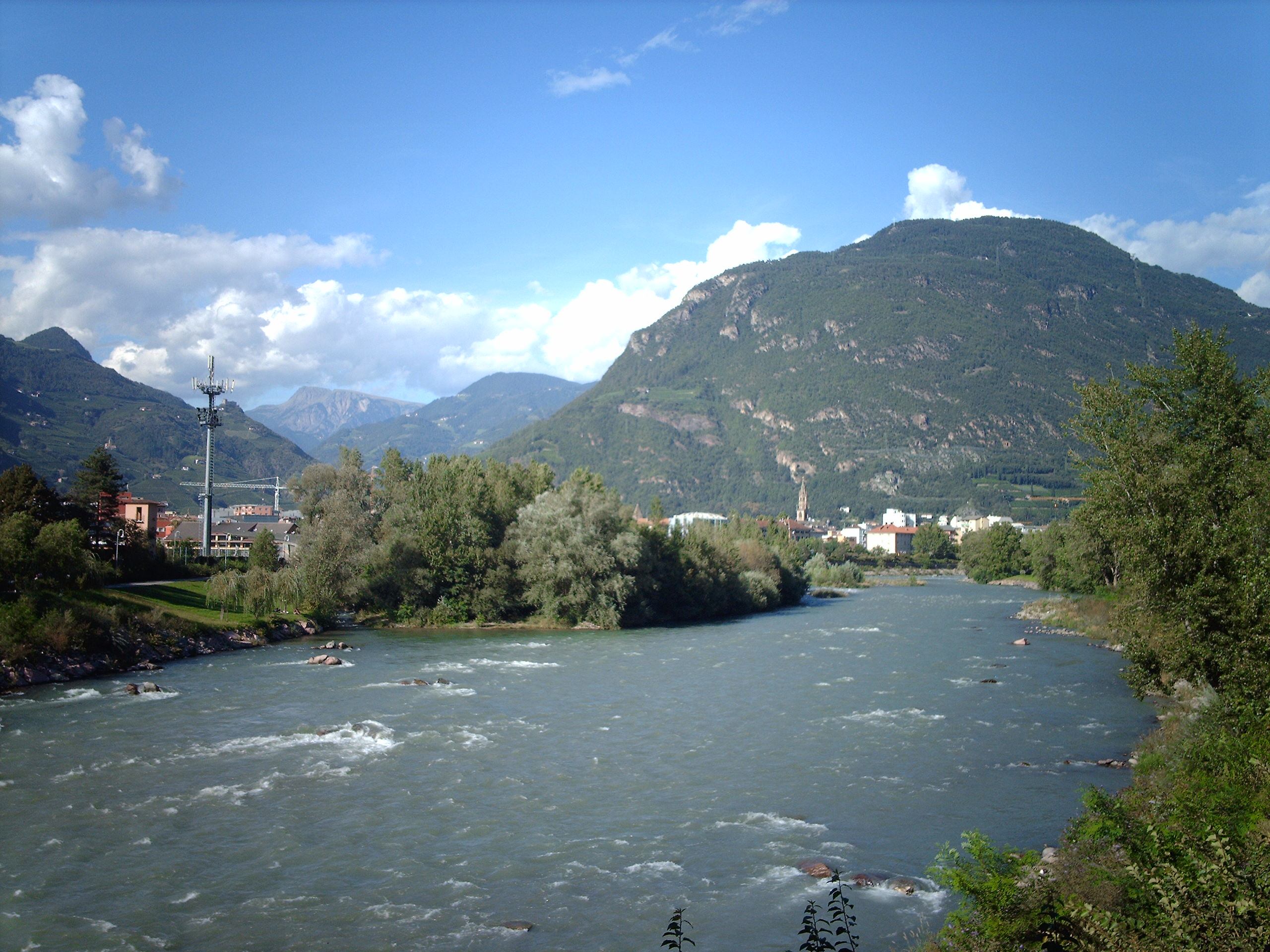
- The river near the city of Bolzano

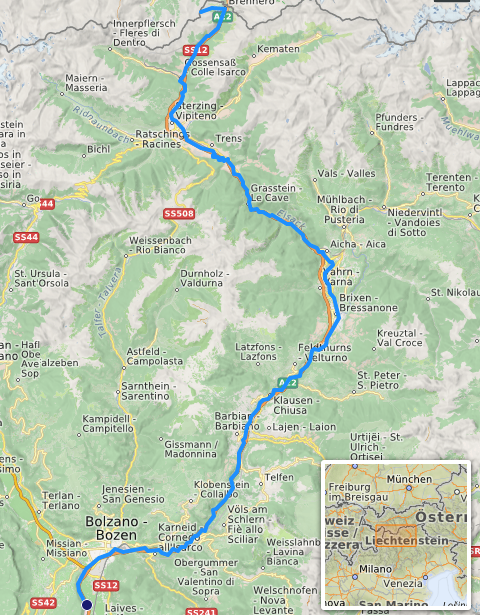

Location
- Country: Italy

Physical characteristics
- Source
  - location: Brenner Pass
  - elevation: 1,990 m (6,530 ft)
- Mouth: Adige
  - coordinates: 46.4412°N 11.3148°E
- Length: 99.9 km (62.1 mi)
- Basin size: 4,960.37 km^{2} (1,915.21 sq mi)
- Discharge
  - average: 58 m^{3}/s (2,000 cu ft/s)

Basin features
- Progression: Adige→ Adriatic Sea

The Eisack (German: Eisack, pronounced [ˈaɪzak]; Italian: Isarco [iˈzarko]; Latin: Isarus or Isarcus) is a river in Northern Italy, the second largest river in South Tyrol. Its source is near the Brenner Pass, at an altitude of about 1990 m above sea level. The river draws water from an area of about 4,200 km^{2}. After about 96 km, it joins the Adige river south of Bolzano. At first the river flows through the Wipptal and after the village of Vahrn through the Eisacktal. Its source is sung of in the Bozner Bergsteigerlied as the northern frontier of the South Tyrolean homeland.

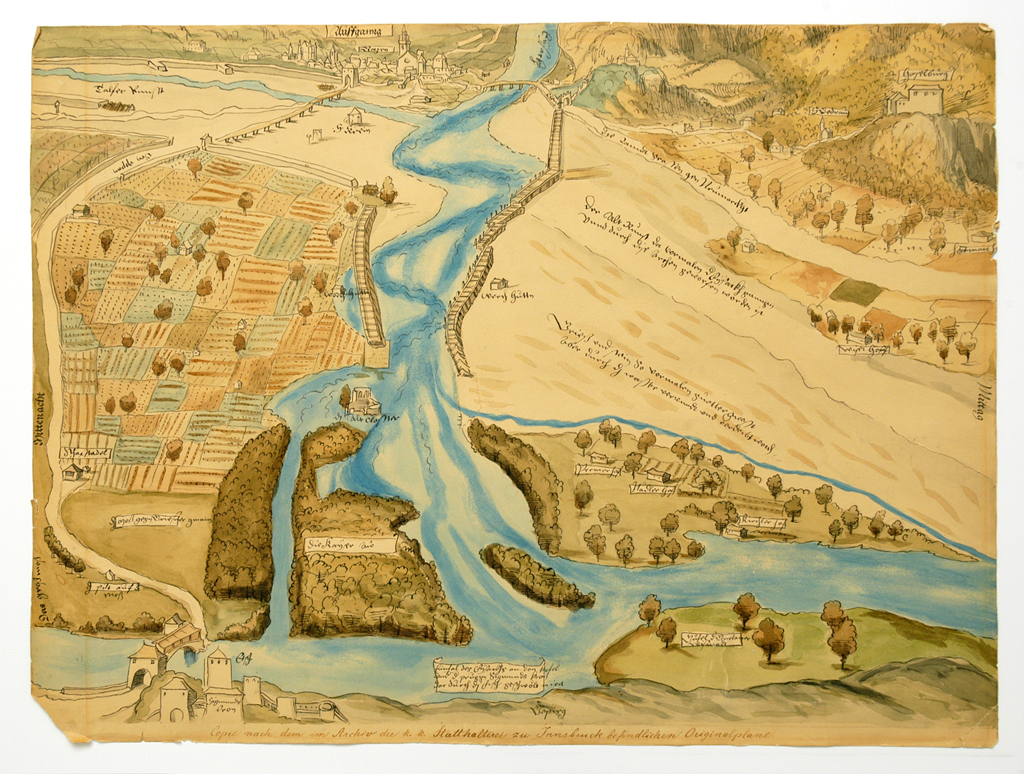
The first depiction of the Eisack: In 1541, the river inundated the southern areas of Bozen-Bolzano.

The major towns and villages along the course of the river are Sterzing, Franzensfeste, Brixen, Klausen, Waidbruck and finally the capital city of the province. In Brixen it merges with the Rienz. Several smaller creeks are tributaries, including the Ridnauner Bach, the Pflerscher Bach, the Pfitscher Bach, the Villnößer Bach, the Derjon, the Braibach (also known as Tierser Bach), the Eggentaler Bach and the Talfer flowing from Sarntal.

The Eisack is used extensively for the production of electricity; it is dammed near Franzensfeste, Klausen and Waidbruck.
