= Villanders =

Villanders/Villandro
- Comune
- Gemeinde Villanders; Comune di Villandro
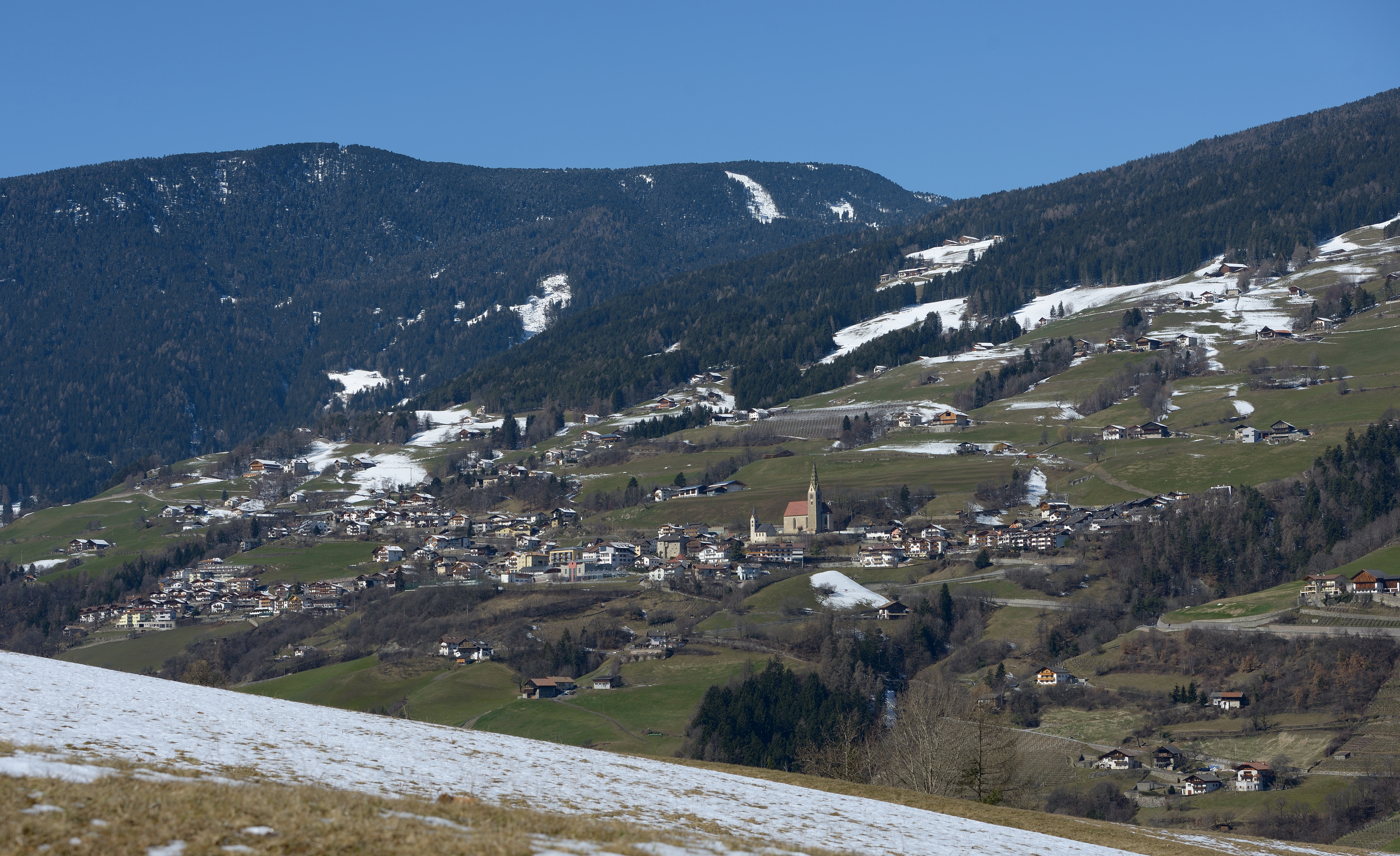
- View from NE

- Location within Italy Location within Trentino-Alto Adige/Südtirol
- Coordinates: 46°38′N 11°32′E
- Country: Italy
- Region: Trentino-Alto Adige/Südtirol
- Province: South Tyrol (BZ)
- Frazioni: St. Stefan (Santo Stefano), St. Moritz (San Maurizio), St. Valentin (San Valentino)

Government
  - Mayor: Walter Baumgartner

Area
  - Total: 44 km^{2} (17 sq mi)
- Elevation: 880 m (2,890 ft)

Population (Nov. 2010)
  - Total: 1,912
  - Density: 43/km^{2} (110/sq mi)
- Demonym(s): German: Villanderser; Italian: Villandresi
- Time zone: UTC+1 (CET)
  - Summer (DST): UTC+2 (CEST)
- Postal code: 39043
- Dialing code: 0472
- Website: Official website

Villanders (German pronunciation: [fɪˈlandɐs]; Italian: Villandro [vilˈlandro]) is a village and comune in South Tyrol in northern Italy with 1,875 inhabitants (as of December 31, 2013). It is located in the Eisack Valley above Klausen.

== Geography ==
Villanders lies on the Villanderer Berg (Mountain of Villanders), at the top of which lies the Totensee (Lake of death). The village is bordered by Barbian, Klausen, Lajen, Ritten and Sarntal.

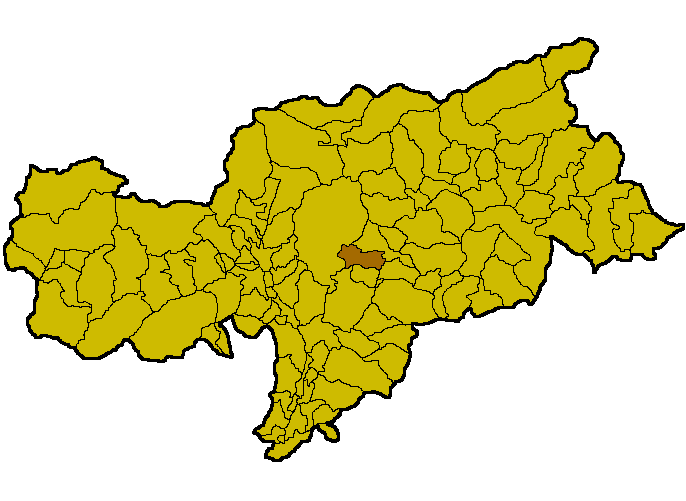
Map of South Tyrol showing Villanders

== History ==
=== Coat of arms ===
The emblem is party per fess of azure and gules, in the first three points of argent, in the second a fess dancetty of argent. It is the arms of the local Lords of Vilanders and Pardell. The emblem was granted in 1966.

=== Toponym ===
Villanders was first mentioned in an official document in 1070 under the name Filandres; in 1085 under the name Filanders, later on as Filanders or Vylanders.

The origin of the name Villanders, which is often believed to derive from the term "viel anders" meaning "a lot different", is not clear to date. Sometimes, the name is believed to have pre-Roman origins (similar to the neighbouring villages Verdings/Verdignes and Feldthurns/Velturno). Other linguists have tried to look for Roman roots (for example "villa antrorum" or "valles antri"), while others even suspect a connection to Flanders in Belgium. However, none of these proposals is convincing. Following a legend, some people in Villanders believe the village was first called "Schönberg", meaning beautiful mountain, and when it was destroyed by a landslide, everything looked "a lot different" ("viel anders" in German) afterwards.

=== Prehistory and early history ===
It can be supposed that in the distant mists of time people discovered that life was pleasant on the fertile moraine soil of the sunny slopes of Villanders and so they settled there. There is evidence that the adjoining Sarntal valley and the surrounding mountains, including the Villanders Mountain and the Alpine meadow have been explored by men and economically exploited since at least the Mesolithic. These finds and the features of the landscape of the alpine meadow of Villanders, which is an ideal grazing ground for ibex, the preferred prey of Mesolithic hunters, suggest that the entire meadow was a summer hunting ground at that time. During excavations in the archaeological zone at Plunacker in the area within and around the village of Villanders, a Mesolithic occupation layer was uncovered, containing stone tools made from flint from the 8th and 7th centuries BC.

At the beginning of the Neolithic from 5000 BC the cultivation of the land and the keeping of domestic animals indicate that people now lived a settled life in South Tyrol. The low mountain landscape in Villanders offered favourable conditions for this. The finds in the Plunacker archaeological zone in Villanders are among the most significant of this epoch in the whole of the Alps. Finds from the Neolithic on the alpine meadows of Villanders also provide evidence of the presence of men at higher levels, but allow no inference as to the use of the alpine meadow for agriculture in the narrower sense of the term.

Finds from the Copper and Bronze Ages are indeed rare; however finds in the surrounding communities of Brixen/Bressanone, Saubach and Barbian/Barbiano do suggest that there was a continuous history of settlement. It is probable that mining had already begun and the copper extracted was sold to communities to the South; at Lake Garda and in the Pianura Padana. The Mediterranean influence on the Southern Alps can also be seen in the world of the intellect: writing on the Etruscan model was introduced and depiction of the gods resembled the Greek and Italian or Etruscan style.

=== Roman times ===
Roman times in what is today known as South Tyrol, begins at the latest with the Emperor Augustus (31 BC - 14 AD) and continues into the 5th and 6th centuries AD. The area around Villanders at that time was continuously settled, but still patchily. The only finds discovered to date were found on the Plunacker. Here the remains of a large and well appointed Roman villa were discovered. At that time the area between Ritten/Renon and Villanders lay in the border country between Trento/Tridentum, Noricum and Rhaetia, but it is impossible to be more precise, because we lack archaeological evidence.

=== The Middle Ages ===
As in other parts of South Tyrol there are very few traces in Villanders from the Early and High Middle Ages (approx. 500-1350 AD). However, it can be assumed that settlement continued, but as yet we have not been fortunate enough to find the evidence of the unbroken inhabitation of any farm from Late Antiquity up to the High Middle Ages.

=== The Lords of Vilanders ===
The title, the "Lords of Vilanders" denoted one of the most powerful noble clans in the Tyrol of the Middle Ages, with its home in Villanders. They were prosperous farmers, who lived in large farmhouses, more like manor houses, and who were soon keen to extend their possessions and to gain political influence.

The first reference to the Lords of Vilanders can be found in church records from the first half of the 12th century. The addition of "von Vilanders" (of Vilanders) became increasingly common during the 13th century and was used by various families, who were not related to each other. The genealogy of the Lords of Vilanders begins with Ekkehard I of Vilanders (1176–1183) then divides into twelve branches.

At first the Lords of Vilanders established themselves as Ministeriales of the Brixen and Trento bishops and in the Villanders court, which formed its own judicial district within the County of Bozen. They were put in charge of fortified castles to control strategically important points, such as the Trostburg, which was granted by Count Meinhard to the judge of Villanders, Randold von Vilanders zu Pradell, who thereupon became the progenitor of the Counts von Wolkenstein and thus also the forebear of the great mediaeval minstrel, Oswald von Wolkenstein.

The political rise of the Lords of Vilanders began under the rule of the Tyrolean Count, Meinhard II (1258 – 1295). They increasingly occupied posts as judges, guardians, canons and deacons and guarded the interests of the nobles at the regional parliaments. Under the reigns of the sons of Meinhard II, Otto, Ludwig and Heinrich the Lords of Vilanders were finally able to secure their position and even to rise to higher social levels. Their estates now extended from Sterzing to Bozen, into the Puster Valley, to Villnöß and into the Gröden Valley, but they also possessed castles and courts in Tramin, Buchenstein (Livinallongo), Feltre and Belluno. The two most important representatives of the Lords of Vilanders were Engelmar and Tegen von Vilanders. They obtained the money to maintain all these estates principally in military campaigns in Italy; for example they fought on the side of Scaligeri of Verona against Padua.

In the quarrels over the land of mountain passes, namely Tyrol, between the Austrian Habsburgs, the Bavarian Wittelsbachs and the Luxembourgers, Engelmar von Vilanders played an inglorious role, which brought about the decline of the Lords of Vilanders. Engelmar von Vilanders, who had meanwhile become governor, thought he could make money from the feud. However, his lack of political acumen sealed his fate. To begin with, he conducted negotiations, which bordered on treason, with the Luxembourgers and their ally, the Bishop of Trento, then did an about-turn, when the defeat of the Luxembourgers loomed over the horizon. At the beginning of April 1347 he swore an oath of loyalty to the Tyrolean sovereign once more. He was pardoned, but had to resign from the post of governor and lost many of his possessions. After their defeat in the wars the Luxembourgers tried once more to bribe the Tyrolean noblemen to rejoin their side. The Lords of Vilanders were unable to resist them and once more allowed themselves to negotiate with their country's enemy. In addition, in October 1347 Engelmar von Vilanders concluded a treaty with the Bishop of Trento, in which they pledged mutual support in the event of an attack.

In the autumn of 1347, Emperor Louis IV the Bavarian led the decisive campaign against his enemies, defeated the bishop of Trento and took his revenge on the former governor, Engelmar von Vilanders, who was charged with high treason, pronounced guilty and sentenced to death. Subsequently, he was beheaded in front of his brother's castle. As a consequence the von Vilanders lost the majority of their possessions. Ekkehard von Vilanders-Trostburg was the only member of the family to regain any political influence, but he was unable to prevent the once powerful line of the Lords of Vilanders from dying out in 1547.

== Society ==
=== Linguistic distribution ===
According to the 2024 census, 98.71% of the population speak German, 1.12% Italian and 0.17% Ladin as first language.

== Culture and sights of interest ==
Villanders is one of the most popular holiday destinations in the Isarco Valley. The surroundings are used for hiking, be it in the valley or on the alpine meadows. Villanders is also known for its mines, which are open to the public. During the Middle Ages the mines were amongst the most important in Tyrol. Especially during the 16th century the mines had a big influence on life in Villanders and Klausen.

The cemetery near the St. Stephen's Parish Church with its wrought-iron crosses facing away from the grave, is also well known.

The tradition of Törggelen, which includes tasting the new wine and eating typical farmers' dishes, is also widespread.

The geographic centre of South Tyrol is also located in the community of Villanders, precisely on the Alpine meadow, the Villanderer Alm, just below Villanders Mountain.
