= Lajen =

- Comune
- Gemeinde Lajen; Comune di Laion
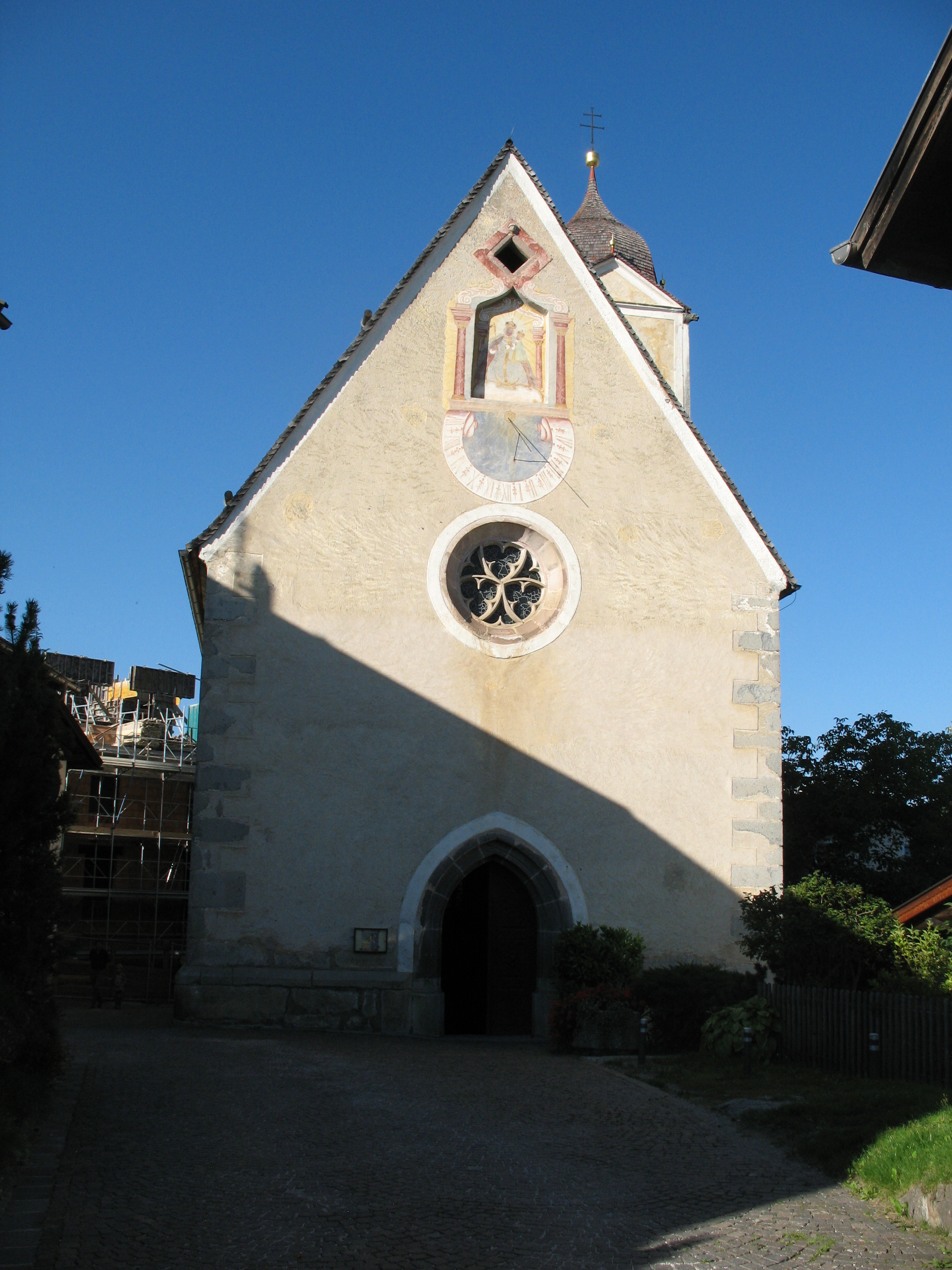
- Church of Our Lady

- Location within Italy Location within Trentino-Alto Adige/Südtirol
- Coordinates: 46°36′N 11°34′E
- Country: Italy
- Region: Trentino-Alto Adige/Südtirol
- Province: South Tyrol (BZ)
- Frazioni: Albions, Freins (Fraina), Ried (Novale), St. Peter (San Pietro), Tanirz (Tanurza), Tschöfas (Ceves)

Government
  - Mayor: Stefan Leiter

Area
  - Total: 37 km^{2} (14 sq mi)
- Elevation: 1,093 m (3,586 ft)

Population (Nov. 2010)
  - Total: 2,610
  - Density: 71/km^{2} (180/sq mi)
- Demonym(s): German:Lajener; Italian: laionesi
- Time zone: UTC+1 (CET)
  - Summer (DST): UTC+2 (CEST)
- Postal code: 39040
- Dialing code: 0471
- Website: Official website

Lajen (German: [ˈlaːjən]; Italian: Laion [laˈjon]; Ladin: Laion or Laiun) is a comune (municipality) in South Tyrol in northern Italy, located about 20 kilometres (12 mi) northeast of the city of Bolzano.

== Geography ==
As of 30 November 2010, it had a population of 2,610 and an area of 37 square kilometres (14 mi^{2}).

Lajen borders the following municipalities: Barbian, Kastelruth, Klausen, Urtijëi, Villanders, Villnöß and Waidbruck.

=== Frazioni ===
The municipality of Lajen contains the frazioni (subdivisions, mainly villages and hamlets) Albions, Freins (Fraina), Ried (Novale), St. Peter (San Pietro), Tanirz (Tanurza) and Tschöfas (Ceves).

== Society ==
=== Linguistic distribution ===
According to the 2024 census, 86.26% of the population speak German, 7.14% Italian and 6.59% Ladin as first language.

=== Demographic evolution ===
Historical population

Year	Pop.	±%
1861	?	—
1871	?	—
1881	?	—
1901	?	—
1911	?	—

Year	Pop.	±%
1921	1,847	—
1931	1,766	−4.4%
1936	1,814	+2.7%
1951	1,849	+1.9%
1961	1,867	+1.0%

Year	Pop.	±%
1971	1,821	−2.5%
1981	1,861	+2.2%
1991	1,945	+4.5%
2001	2,261	+16.2%

Source: Data from ISTAT
