= Feldthurns =

- Comune
- Gemeinde Feldthurns; Comune di Velturno
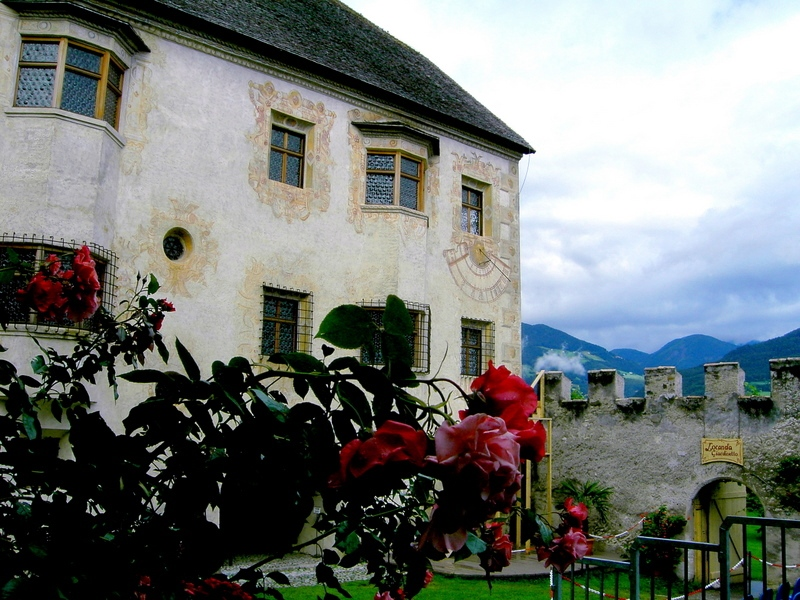
- Velthurns Castle

- Location within Italy Location within Trentino-Alto Adige/Südtirol
- Coordinates: 46°40′N 11°36′E
- Country: Italy
- Region: Trentino-Alto Adige/Südtirol
- Province: South Tyrol (BZ)
- Frazioni: Garn (Caerne), Schnauders (Snodres), Schrambach (San Pietro Mezzomonte), Tschiffnon (Giovignano)

Government
  - Mayor: Patrick Delueg

Area
  - Total: 24.8 km^{2} (9.6 sq mi)
- Elevation: 851 m (2,792 ft)

Population (Jan. 2019)
  - Total: 2,740
  - Density: 110/km^{2} (286/sq mi)
- Demonym(s): German: Feldthurner; Italian: velturnesi
- Time zone: UTC+1 (CET)
  - Summer (DST): UTC+2 (CEST)
- Postal code: 39043
- Dialing code: 0472
- Patron saint: Maria
- Website: Official website

Feldthurns (German pronunciation: [fɛlˈtʊrns]; Italian: Velturno [velˈturno]) is a comune (municipality) and a village in South Tyrol in northern Italy about 25 kilometres (16 mi) northeast of Bolzano.

== Geography ==
As of 30 January 2019, it had a population of 2,873 and an area of 24.8 square kilometres (9.6 mi^{2}).

Feldthurns borders Brixen, Klausen, Villnöß and Vahrn.

=== Frazioni ===
The municipality of Feldthurns contains the frazioni (subdivisions, mainly villages and hamlets) Garn (Caerne), Schnauders (Snodres), Schrambach (San Pietro Mezzomonte), Tschiffnon (Giovignano).

== History ==
=== Coat-of-arms ===
The emblem is party per fess: in the first part it's represented two embattled towers of gules, the second is checky of gules. It is the canting arms used in 1607 in the castle by the Bishops of Brixen and symbolizes the German name of the municipality: towers (Thurn) over the fields (Feld). The emblem was granted in 1966.

=== Notable residents ===
Isotopic analysis of Ötzi the Iceman's tooth enamel suggests that he may have spent his childhood in present-day Feldthurns, circa 3275 BCE.

== Society ==
=== Linguistic distribution ===
According to the 2024 census, 98.02% of the population speak German, 1.60% Italian and 0.38% Ladin as their first language.

=== Demographic evolution ===
Historical population

Year	Pop.	±%
1861	?	—
1871	?	—
1881	?	—
1901	?	—
1911	?	—

Year	Pop.	±%
1921	1,152	—
1931	1,272	+10.4%
1936	1,335	+5.0%
1951	1,388	+4.0%
1961	1,504	+8.4%

Year	Pop.	±%
1971	1,735	+15.4%
1981	2,042	+17.7%
1991	2,302	+12.7%
2001	2,541	+10.4%

Source: Data from ISTAT
