= Kastelruth =

- Comune
- Marktgemeinde Kastelruth; Comune di Castelrotto; Chemun de Ciastel
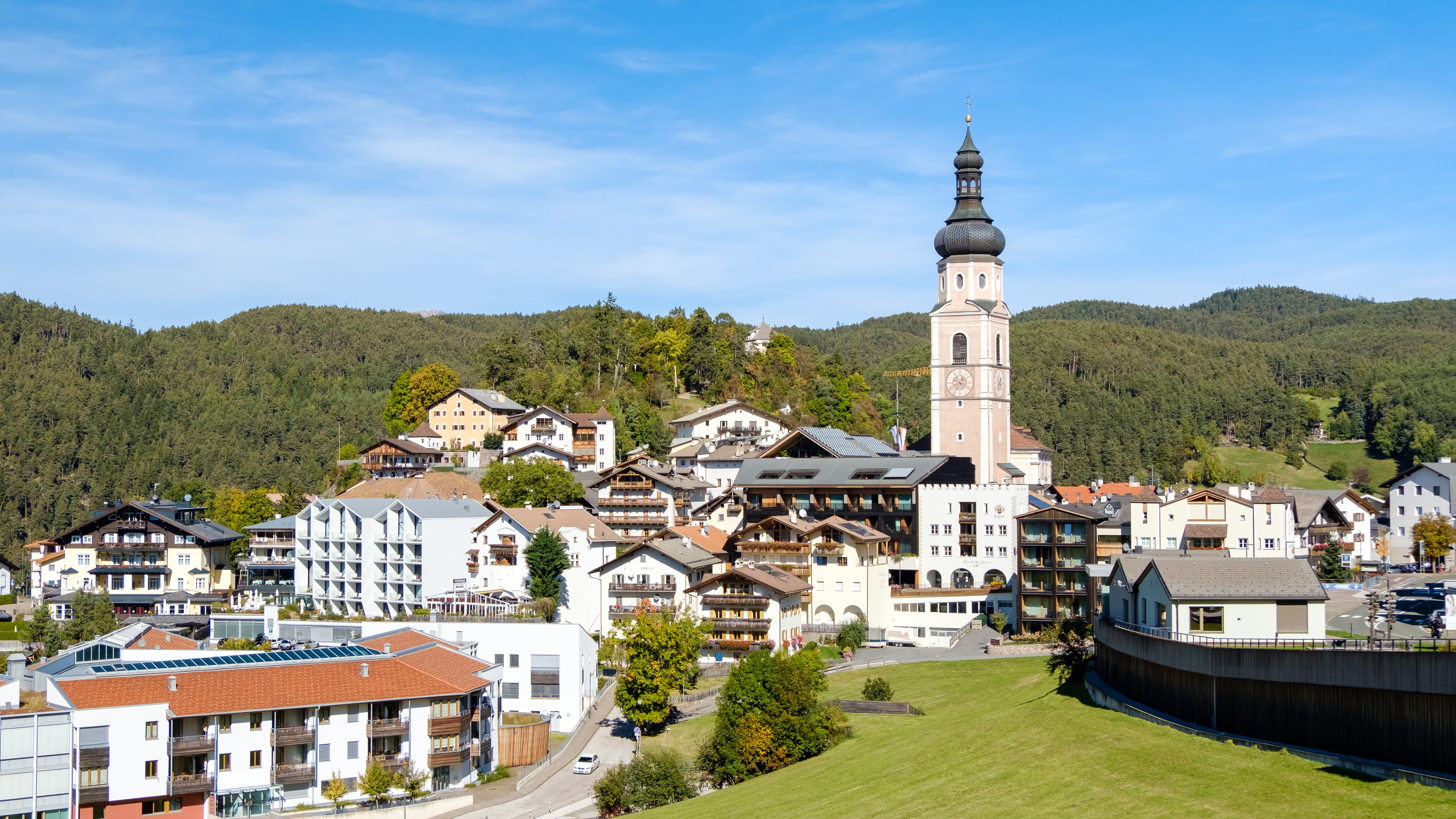
- View of Kastelruth

- Coat of arms

- Location within Italy Location within Trentino-Alto Adige/Südtirol
- Coordinates: 46°34′N 11°34′E
- Country: Italy
- Region: Trentino-Alto Adige/Südtirol
- Province: South Tyrol (BZ)
- Frazioni: Seis am Schlern (Sieusi), Seiser Alm (lad. Mont Sëuc, it. Alpe di Siusi), Pufels (lad. Bula, it. Bulla), Runggaditsch (lad. Roncadic, it. Roncadizza), St. Michael (lad. San Michiel, it. San Michele), St. Oswald (Sant'Osvaldo), St. Valentin (San Valentino), St. Vigil (San Vigilio), Tagusens (Tagusa), Tisens (Tisana), Überwasser (lad. Sureghes, it. Oltretorrente)

Government
  - Mayor: Cristina Pallanch

Area
  - Total: 117.8 km^{2} (45.5 sq mi)

Population (Nov. 2010)
  - Total: 6,456
  - Density: 54.80/km^{2} (141.9/sq mi)
- Demonym(s): German: Kastelruther; Italian: di Castelrotto
- Time zone: UTC+1 (CET)
  - Summer (DST): UTC+2 (CEST)
- Postal code: 39040
- Dialing code: 0471
- ISTAT code: 021019
- Website: Official website

Kastelruth (Austrian German: [ˌkastl̩ˈruːt]; Italian: Castelrotto [kaˌstɛlˈrotto]; Ladin: Ciastel) is a comune (municipality) and a village in South Tyrol in northern Italy, about 20 kilometres (12 mi) northeast of the city of Bolzano. It is one of I Borghi più belli d'Italia ("The most beautiful villages of Italy").

== Geography ==
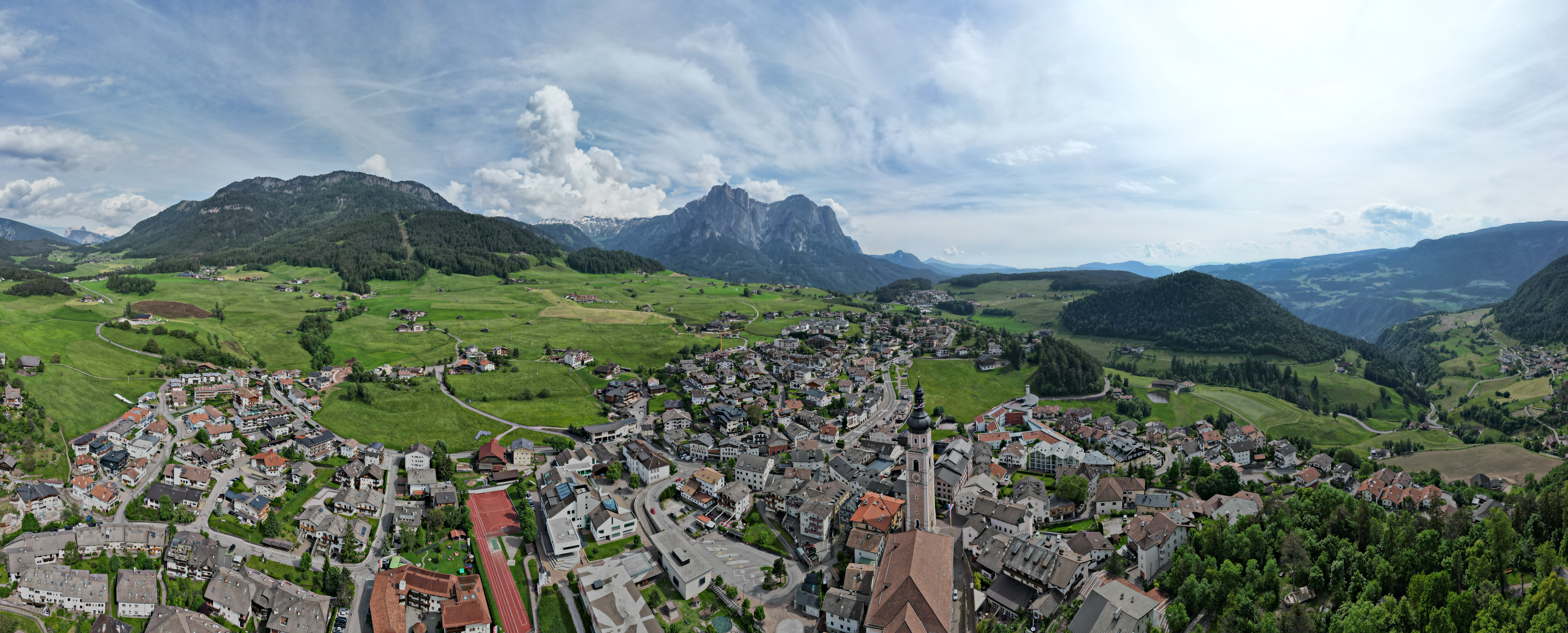
The Dolomites from the perspective of Kastelruth

As of 30 November 2010, it had a population of 6456 and an area of 117.8 square kilometres (45.5 mi^{2}).

Kastelruth borders the following municipalities: Barbian, Campitello di Fassa, Völs am Schlern, Lajen, Urtijëi, Waidbruck, Ritten, Santa Cristina Gherdëina and Tiers.

=== Frazioni ===
The municipality contains the frazioni (subdivisions, mainly villages and hamlets) Seiser Alm (Alpe di Siusi), Pufels (lad. Bula, it. Bulla), Runggaditsch (lad. Roncadic, it. Roncadizza), St. Michael (San Michele), Seis am Schlern (Siusi), St. Oswald (Sant'Osvaldo), St. Valentin (San Valentino), St. Vigil (San Vigilio), Tagusens (Tagusa), Tisens (Tisana) and Überwasser (lad. Sureghes, it. Oltretorrente).

== Society ==
=== Linguistic distribution ===
According to the 2024 census, 78.47% of the population speak German, 15.81% Ladin and 5.72% Italian as first language.

=== Demographic evolution ===
Historical population

Year	Pop.	±%
1860	?	—
1870	?	—
1880	3,208	—
1900	?	—
1910	3,521	—
1921	3,567	+1.3%

Year	Pop.	±%
1931	3,878	+8.7%
1936	4,053	+4.5%
1951	4,035	−0.4%
1961	4,437	+10.0%
1971	5,162	+16.3%
1981	5,399	+4.6%

Year	Pop.	±%
1991	5,600	+3.7%
2001	5,994	+7.0%
2011	6,459	+7.8%
2021	6,891	+6.7%
2026	7,086	+2.8%

Source: Data from ISTAT

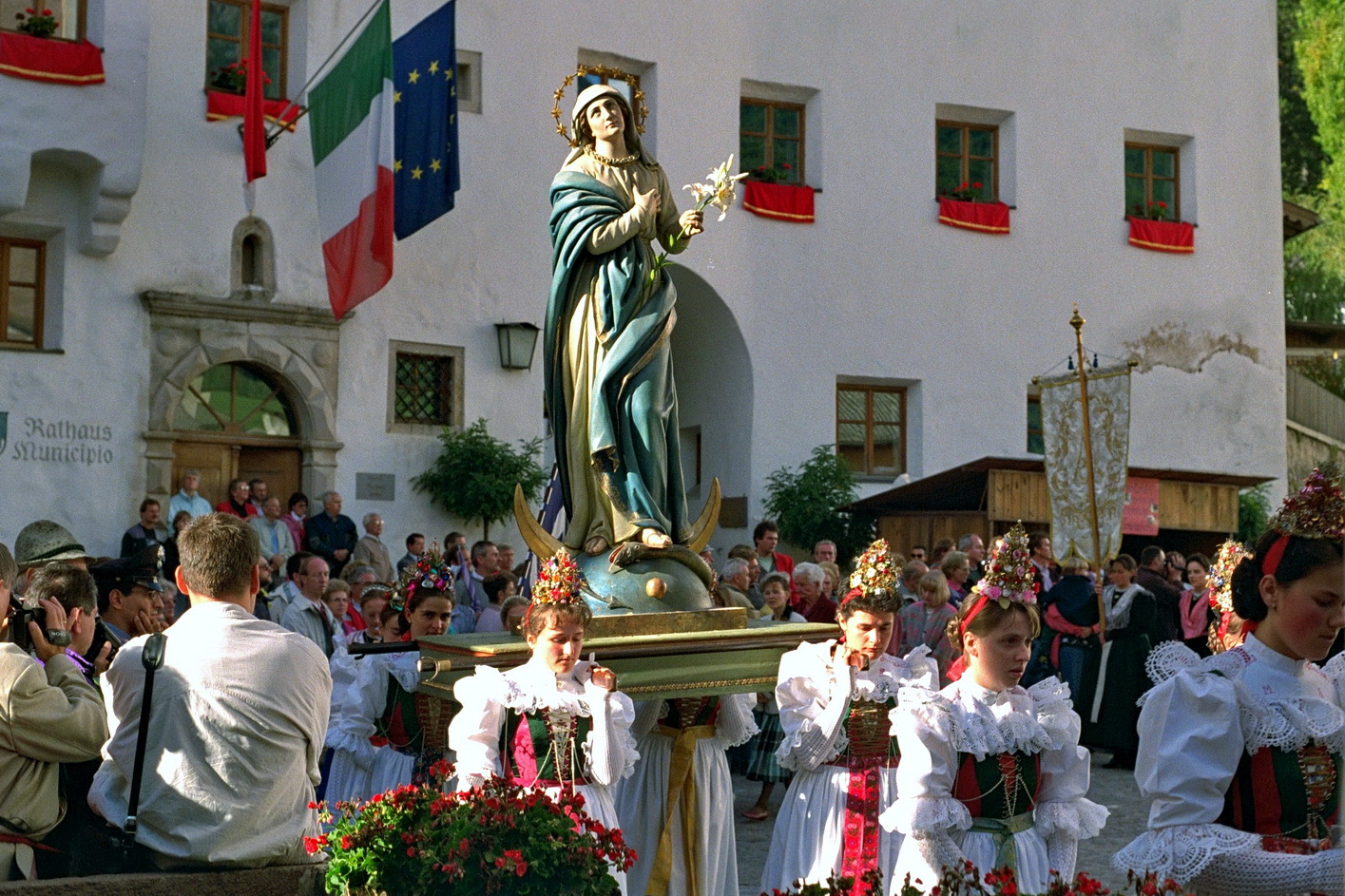
Traditional thanksgiving

== Notable people ==
- Leo Santifaller (1890-1974), historian
- Martino Fill (born 1939), an Italian alpine skier
- Norbert Rier (born 1960), lead singer of the Kastelruther Spatzen
- Christine Novaković (born 1964), banker
- Denise Karbon (born 1980), retired World Cup alpine ski racer
- Peter Fill (born 1982), World Cup alpine ski racer
