= Talfer =

Talfer/Talvera
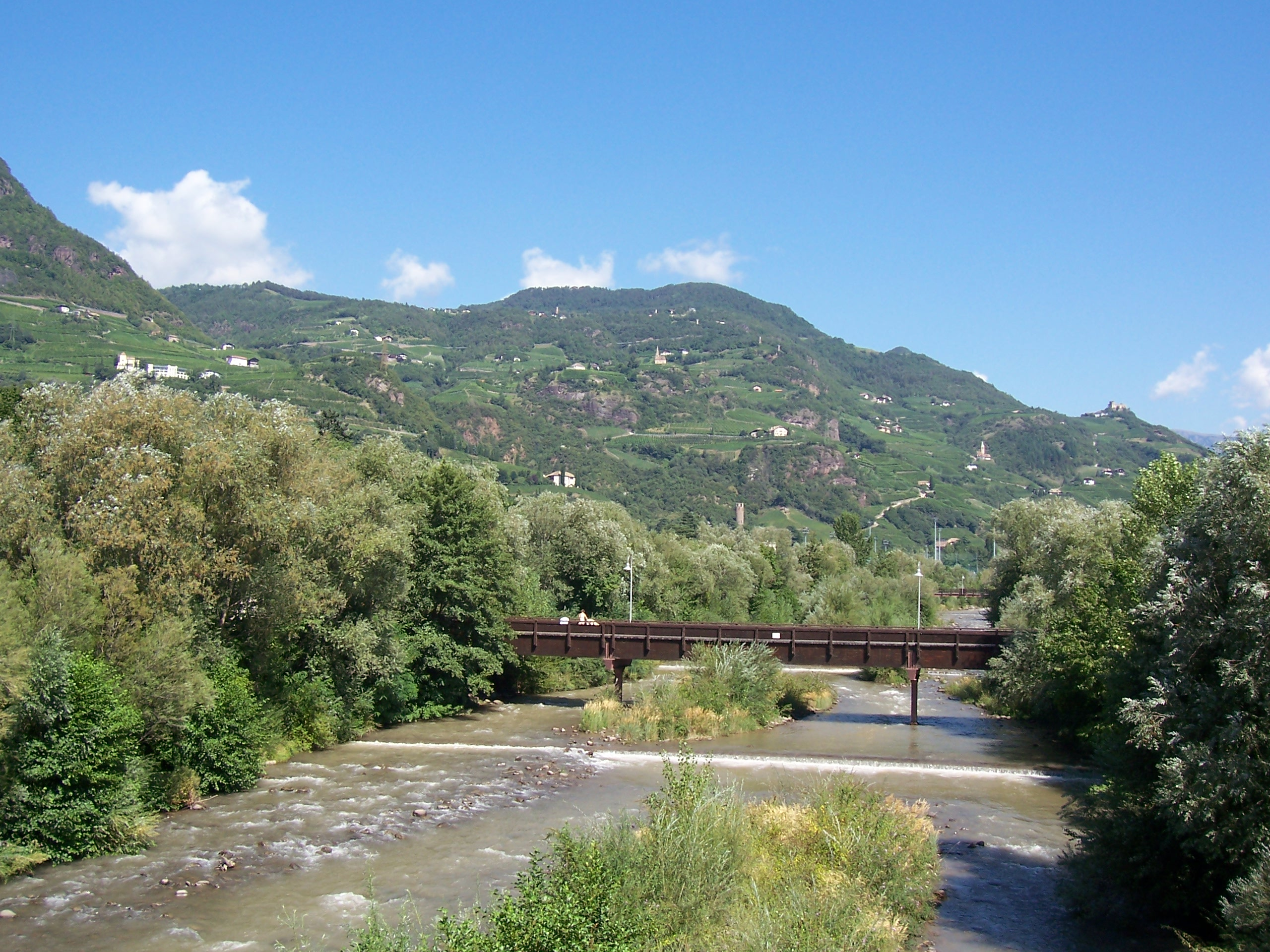
- Talfer at Bozen

Location
- Country: Italy

Physical characteristics
- Source
  - location: Penser Joch, South Tyrol
  - coordinates: 46°48′15″N 11°27′39″E
  - elevation: 2,781 m (9,124 ft)
- Mouth: Eisack
  - location: Bolzano, South Tyrol
  - coordinates: 46°29′34″N 11°20′55″E
  - elevation: 259 m (850 ft)
- Length: 45.5 km (28.3 mi)
- Basin size: 429 km^{2} (166 sq mi)

Basin features
- Progression: Eisack→ Adige→ Adriatic Sea

The Talfer (German pronunciation: [ˈtalfɐ]; Italian: Talvera) is a river located in South Tyrol, Italy. It flows into the Eisack in Bolzano.
