= Barbian =

- Comune
- Gemeinde Barbian; Comune di Barbiano
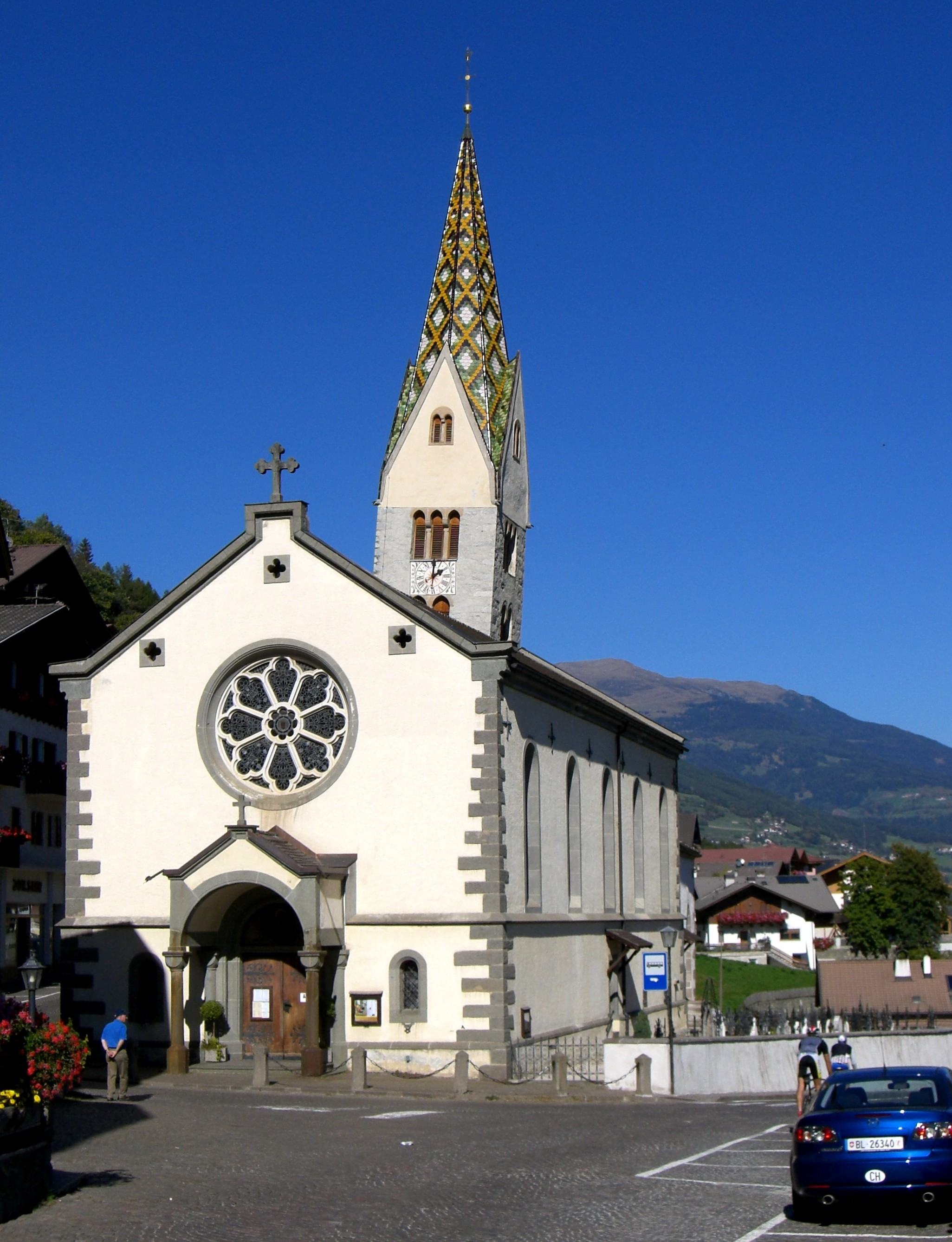
- Parish church of Saint James

- Coat of arms

- Location within Italy Location within Trentino-Alto Adige/Südtirol
- Coordinates: 46°36′N 11°31′E
- Country: Italy
- Region: Trentino-Alto Adige/Südtirol
- Province: Bolzano (BZ)
- Frazioni: Kollmann (Colma), St. Gertraud (Santa Gertrude), Saubach

Government
  - Mayor: Josef Gafriller

Area
  - Total: 24.4 km^{2} (9.4 sq mi)
- Elevation: 836 m (2,743 ft)

Population (November 2010)
  - Total: 1,601
  - Density: 65.6/km^{2} (170/sq mi)
- Demonyms: German: Barbianer; Italian: Barbianesi
- Time zone: UTC+1 (CET)
  - Summer (DST): UTC+2 (CEST)
- Postal code: 39040
- Dialing code: 0471
- Website: Official website

Barbian (German: [ˈbarbi̯aːn]; Italian: Barbiano [barˈbjaːno]) is a comune (municipality) and a village in South Tyrol in northern Italy, located about 15 kilometres (9 mi) northeast of Bolzano.

== Geography ==
As of 30 November 2010, it had a population of 1,601 and an area of 24.4 square kilometres (9.4 mi^{2}).

Barbian borders the following municipalities: Kastelruth, Lajen, Waidbruck, Ritten, and Villanders.

=== Frazioni ===
The municipality of Barbian contains the frazioni (subdivisions, mainly villages and hamlets) Kollmann (Colma), St. Gertraud (Santa Gertrude), Saubach.

== History ==
=== Place-name ===
The dwelling is mentioned for the first time in 994 as Parpian, the name deriving probably from the Latin personal name Barbius, a name also attested in Venetic inscriptions from the Roman era.

=== Coat-of-arms ===
The shield is tierced per fess in argent, vert and sable. In the second level are represented three churches: St. Nicholas, St. Gertrude and St. Magdalene, which are located in the mountains above the village. The sable bottom is crossed by a thin band of argent and gules, symbolizing the customs bar of the village of Kollmann sited in the municipality. The arms were granted in 1970.

== Society ==
=== Linguistic distribution ===
According to the 2024 census, 97.53% of the population speak German, 1.87% Italian and 0.60% Ladin as first language.

Language	1991	2001	2011	2024
German	94.80%	97.47%	97.53%	96.74%
Italian	4.56%	2.02%	1.87%	1.88%
Ladin	0.64%	0.51%	0.60%	1.38%

=== Demographic evolution ===
Historical population

Year	Pop.	±%
1861	?	—
1871	?	—
1881	?	—
1901	?	—
1911	?	—

Year	Pop.	±%
1921	1,128	—
1931	1,098	−2.7%
1936	1,250	+13.8%
1951	1,298	+3.8%
1961	1,198	−7.7%

Year	Pop.	±%
1971	1,309	+9.3%
1981	1,381	+5.5%
1991	1,444	+4.6%
2001	1,520	+5.3%

Source: Data from ISTAT
