= Sarntal =

- Comune
- Gemeinde Sarntal; Comune di Sarentino
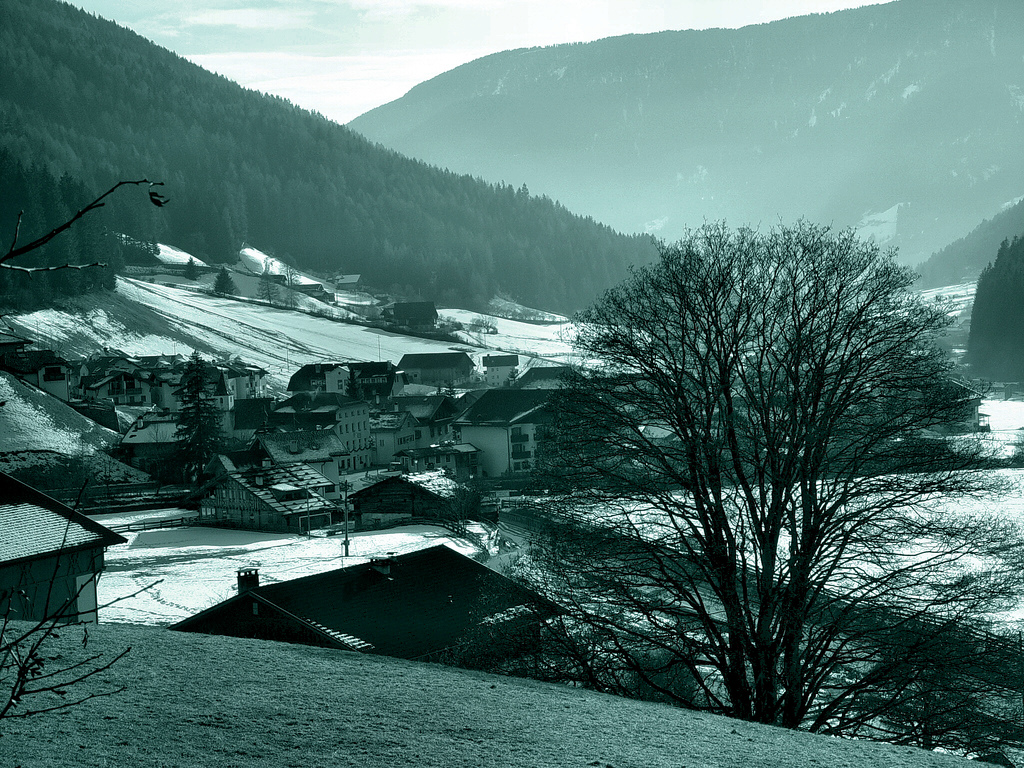
- The frazione of Astfeld in winter.

- Coat of arms

- Location within Italy Location within Trentino-Alto Adige/Südtirol
- Coordinates: 46°39′N 11°21′E
- Country: Italy
- Region: Trentino-Alto Adige/Südtirol
- Province: South Tyrol (BZ)
- Frazioni: Sarnthein (Sarentino), Aberstückl (Sonvigo), Agratsberg (Acereto), Astfeld (Campolasta), Auen (Prati), Außerpens (Pennes di Fuori), Dick (Spessa ), Durnholz (Valdurna), Essenberg (Montessa), Gebracksberg (Campo di Ronco), Gentersberg, Glern (Collerno), Innerpens (Pennes di Dentro), Kandelsberg, Muls (Mules), Niederwangen (Vangabassa), Nordheim (Villa), Öttenbach (Riodeserto), Putzen (Pozza), Reinswald (S.Martino), Riedelsberg (Montenovale), Rungg, Steet (Stetto), Trienbach (Trina), Unterreinswald (Boscoriva), Vormeswald (Selva di Vormes), Weissenbach (Riobianco), Windlahn (Lana al Vento)

Government
  - Mayor: Josef Mair

Area
  - Total: 302.3 km^{2} (116.7 sq mi)
- Elevation: 900 m (3,000 ft)

Population (Nov. 2020)
  - Total: 7,182
  - Density: 23.76/km^{2} (61.53/sq mi)
- Demonym(s): German: Sarntaler or Sarner; Italian: Sarentini
- Time zone: UTC+1 (CET)
  - Summer (DST): UTC+2 (CEST)
- Postal code: 39058
- Dialing code: 0471
- Website: Official website

Sarntal (German: [ˈsarntaːl]; Italian: Sarentino [sarenˈtiːno]) is a valley and a comune (municipality) in South Tyrol in northern Italy, located about 15 kilometres (9 mi) north of the city of Bolzano. The municipality comprises several towns and villages. The largest one, seat of the mayor and council, is Sarnthein.

== Geography ==
Sarntal borders the following municipalities: Hafling, Freienfeld, Klausen, Franzensfeste, Mölten, Ratschings, Ritten, Jenesien, St. Leonhard in Passeier, Schenna, Vahrn, Vöran and Villanders. The Durnholzer See is located in the municipal territory. The main river is the Talfer, which has its source at the Weißhorn mountain in the Pensertal.

== History ==
The village of Sarnthein was first mentioned in 1211.

=== Coat of arms ===
The emblem represents an or deer’s head on azure. The insignia looks like that of the various Lords who administered the territory since 1315, but since 1681 they were named Counts of Sarnthein (Grafen von Sarnthein) living in the Kellerburg Castle. The emblem was adopted in 1967.

== Society ==
=== Linguistic distribution ===
According to the 2024 census, 97.19% of the population speak German, 2.69% Italian and 0.12% Ladin as first language.

== Notable people ==
- Franz Thaler (1925 in Sarntal – 2015), an author, a peacock quill embroiderer and a survivor of the concentration camp in Dachau
- Gustav Hofer (Sarntal, 1976), film director, screenwriter, journalist and TV host
