= Waidbruck =

- Comune
- Gemeinde Waidbruck; Comune di Ponte Gardena
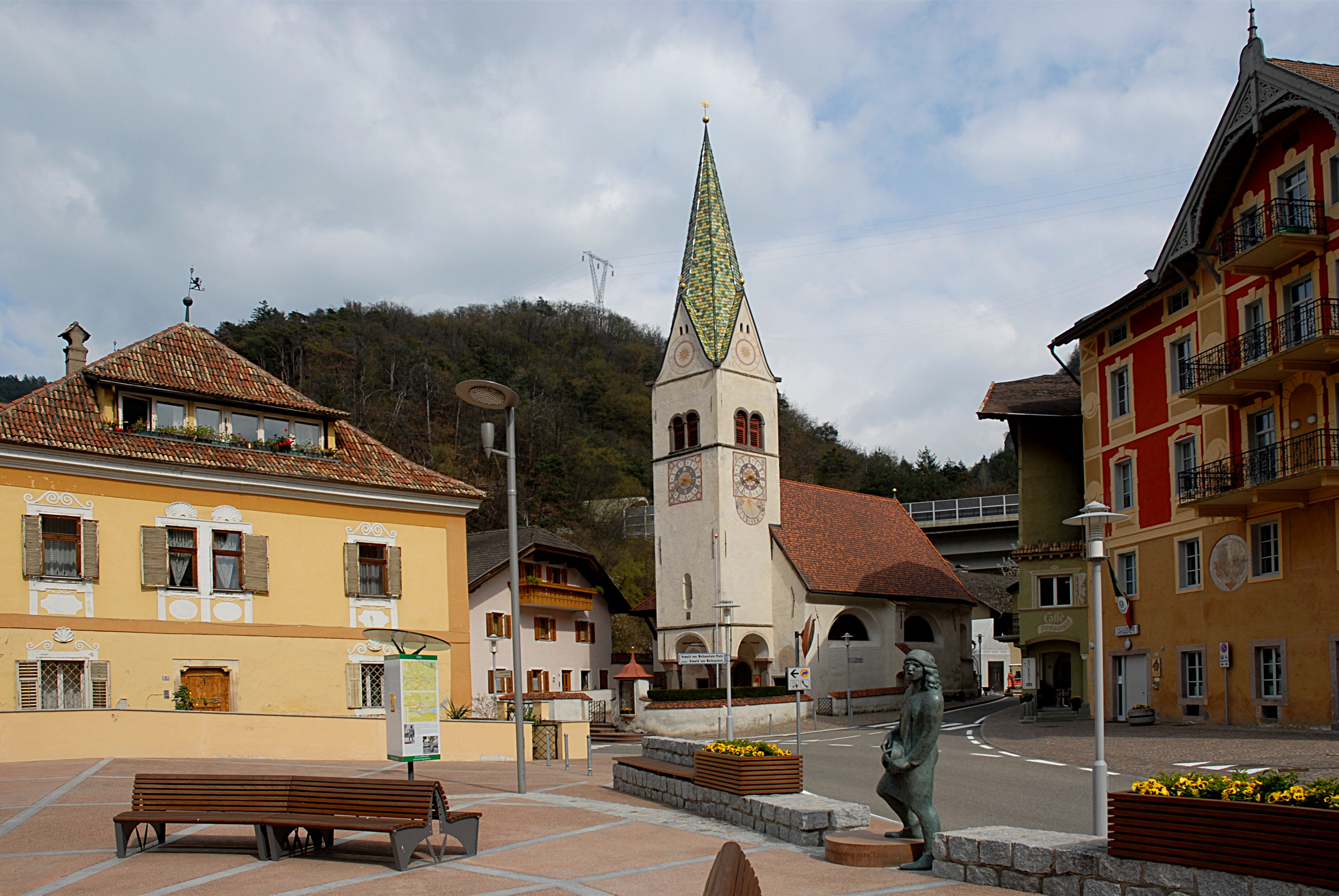
- Oswald von Wolkenstein Town Square

- Location within Italy Location within Trentino-Alto Adige/Südtirol
- Coordinates: 46°36′N 11°32′E
- Country: Italy
- Region: Trentino-Alto Adige/Südtirol
- Province: South Tyrol (BZ)

Government
  - Mayor: Philipp Kerschbaumer

Area
  - Total: 2.3 km^{2} (0.89 sq mi)
- Elevation: 471 m (1,545 ft)

Population (Nov. 2010)
  - Total: 192
  - Density: 83/km^{2} (220/sq mi)
- Demonym(s): German: Waidbrucker; Italian: pontegardenesi
- Time zone: UTC+1 (CET)
  - Summer (DST): UTC+2 (CEST)
- Postal code: 39040
- Dialing code: 0471
- Website: Official website

Waidbruck (German: [vaɪtˈbrʊk]; Italian: Ponte Gardena [ˈponte ɡarˈdeːna, - ɡarˈdɛːna]; Ladin: Pruca) is a comune (municipality) in South Tyrol in northern Italy, located about 20 kilometres (12 mi) northeast of Bolzano.

== Geography ==
As of November 30, 2010, it had a population of 192 and an area of 2.3 square kilometres (0.89 mi^{2}).

Waidbruck borders the following municipalities: Barbian, Kastelruth and Lajen.

== History ==
=== Place name ===
An archaic form of the comune's name, Waidepruk (1264), reveals its origins from Old High German. Waid means "meadow" and pruk means "bridge". The Italian name, "Ponte Gardena", has only been created during the Italianization process carried out by the Italian Fascism.

=== Coat-of-arms ===
The emblem symbolizes the bridge; argent a fess nebuly gules on azure that indicates the Eisack river. The reason comes from the gules and argent insignia of the counts of Wolkenstein, owners of the local Trostburg Castle since 1385. The emblem was adopted in 1969.

== Society ==
=== Linguistic distribution ===
According to the 2024 census, 78.21% of the population speak German, 17.31% Italian and 4.49% Ladin as first language.

=== Demographic evolution ===
Historical population

Year	Pop.	±%
1861	?	—
1871	?	—
1881	?	—
1901	?	—
1911	?	—

Year	Pop.	±%
1921	193	—
1931	245	+26.9%
1936	230	−6.1%
1951	257	+11.7%
1961	285	+10.9%

Year	Pop.	±%
1971	257	−9.8%
1981	212	−17.5%
1991	210	−0.9%
2001	181	−13.8%

Source: Data from ISTAT
