= Jenesien =

- Comune
- Gemeinde Jenesien; Comune di San Genesio Atesino
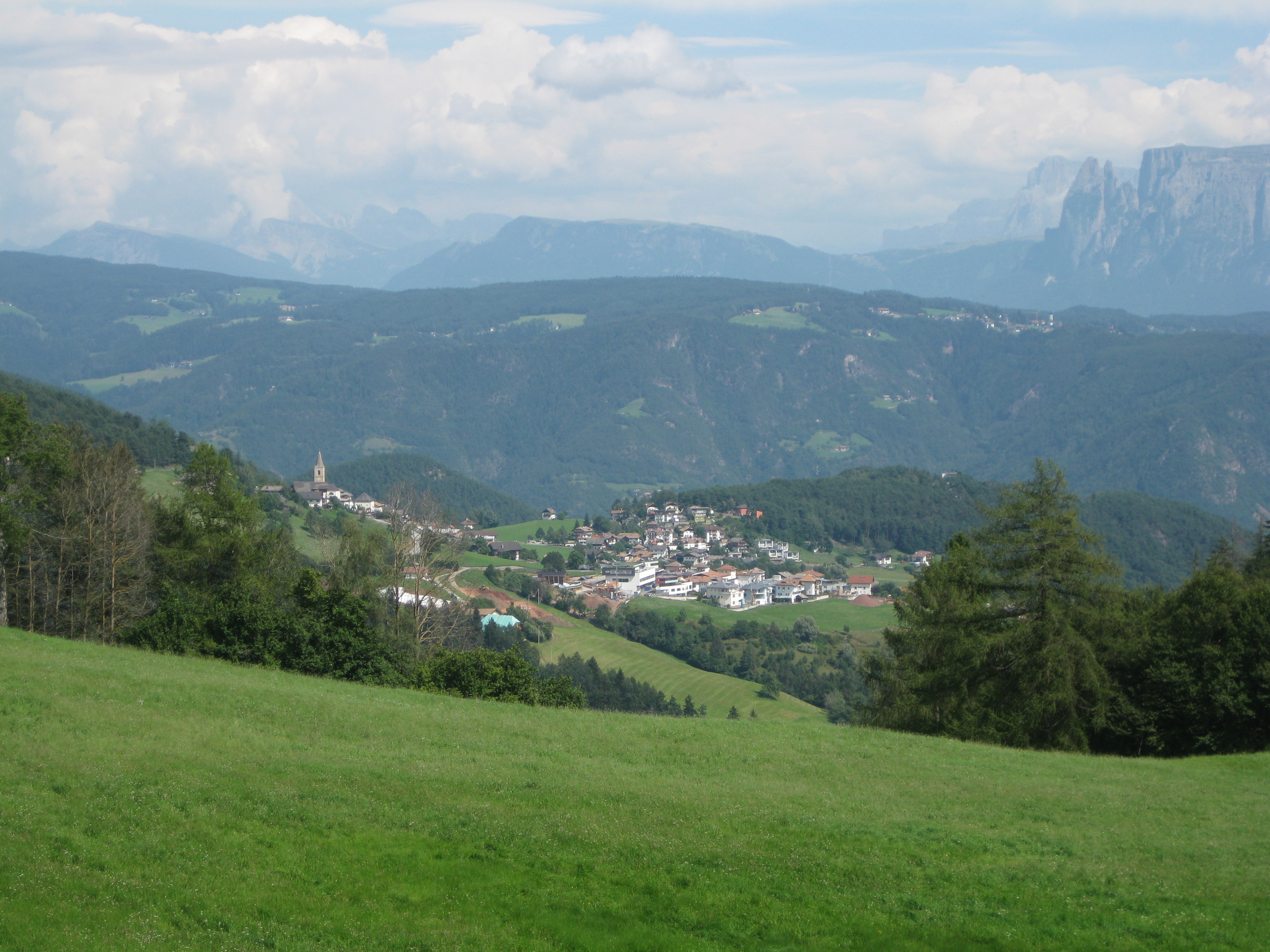
- Jenesien seen from the west

- Location within Italy Location within Trentino-Alto Adige/Südtirol
- Coordinates: 46°32′N 11°20′E
- Country: Italy
- Region: Trentino-Alto Adige/Südtirol
- Province: South Tyrol (BZ)
- Frazioni: Afing (Avigna), Flaas (Valas), Glaning (Cologna), Nobls (Montoppio)

Government
  - Mayor: Paul Romen (SVP)

Area
  - Total: 69.0 km^{2} (26.6 sq mi)
- Elevation: 1,000 m (3,300 ft)

Population (Nov. 2010)
  - Total: 2,952
  - Density: 42.8/km^{2} (111/sq mi)
- Demonym(s): German: Jenesier; Italian: di San Genesio
- Time zone: UTC+1 (CET)
  - Summer (DST): UTC+2 (CEST)
- Postal code: 39050
- Dialing code: 0471
- Website: Official website

Jenesien (Austrian German: [jeˈneːsi̯ən]; Italian: San Genesio Atesino [san dʒeˈnɛːzjo ateˈziːno]) is a comune (municipality) and a village in the province of South Tyrol in northern Italy, located about 4 kilometres (2.5 mi) northwest of the city of Bolzano.

== Geography ==
As of 30 November 2010, it had a population of 2,952 and an area of 69.0 square kilometres (26.6 mi^{2}).

Jenesien borders the following municipalities: Bolzano, Mölten, Ritten, Sarntal, and Terlan.

=== Frazioni ===
The municipality of Jenesien contains the frazioni (subdivisions, mainly villages and hamlets) Afing (Avigna), Flaas (Valas), Glaning (Cologna), and Nobls (Montoppio).

== History ==
=== Coat-of-arms ===
The emblem is argent party per bend and five piles of gules, coming out of the diagonal division. It is the insignia of the Lords of Goldegg who lived in the village from 1190 to 1473. The emblem was adopted in 1966.

== Society ==
=== Linguistic distribution ===
According to the 2024 census, 95.03% of the population speak German, 4.83% Italian and 0.14% Ladin as first language.

== Demographic evolution ==
Historical population

Year	Pop.	±%
1860	?	—
1870	?	—
1880	1,855	—
1900	?	—
1910	1,772	—

Year	Pop.	±%
1921	1,679	−5.2%
1931	1,803	+7.4%
1936	1,909	+5.9%
1951	1,992	+4.3%
1961	1,965	−1.4%

Year	Pop.	±%
1971	2,058	+4.7%
1981	2,162	+5.1%
1991	2,353	+8.8%
2001	2,703	+14.9%

Source: Data from ISTAT

== Twin towns ==
Jenesien is twinned with:

- Feldkirchen-Westerham, Germany
