= Klausen, South Tyrol =

Klausen/Chiusa
- Comune
- Gemeinde Klausen; Comune di Chiusa; Chemum de Tluses
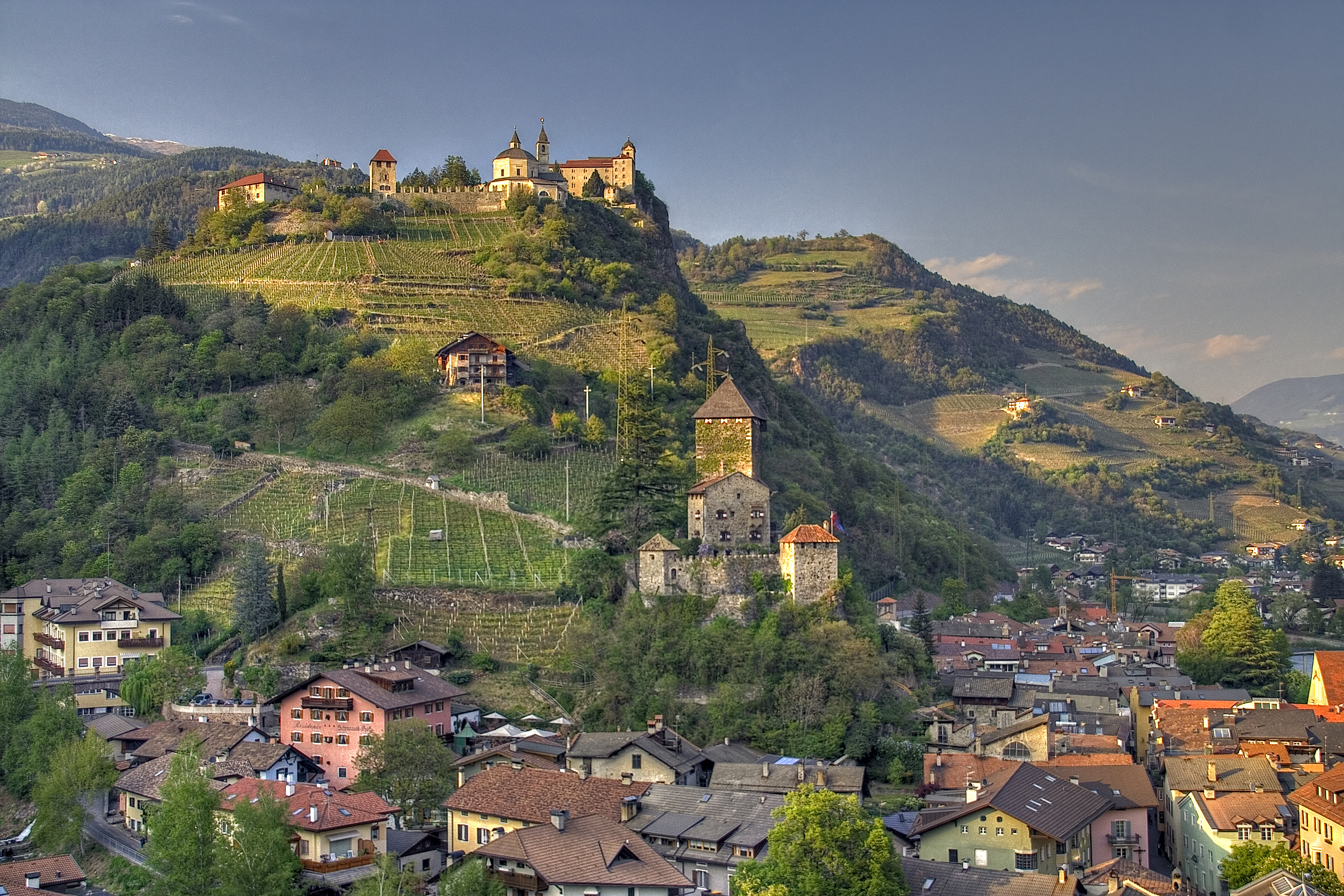
- View of Klausen

- Coat of arms

- Location within Italy Location within Trentino-Alto Adige/Südtirol
- Coordinates: 46°38′N 11°34′E
- Country: Italy
- Region: Trentino-Alto Adige/Südtirol
- Province: South Tyrol (BZ)
- Frazioni: Gufidaun (Gudon), Latzfons (Lazfons), Verdings (Verdignes)

Government
  - Mayor: Peter Gasser

Area
  - Total: 51.4 km^{2} (19.8 sq mi)
- Elevation: 523 m (1,716 ft)

Population (31-12-2026)
  - Total: 5,225
  - Density: 102/km^{2} (263/sq mi)
- Demonym(s): German:Klausner; Italian: chiusani
- Time zone: UTC+1 (CET)
  - Summer (DST): UTC+2 (CEST)
- Postal code: 39043
- Dialing code: 0472
- Website: www.gemeinde.klausen.bz.it

Klausen (Austrian German: [ˈklaʊsn̩]; Italian: Chiusa [ˈkjuːza]; Ladin: Tluses or Tlüses) is an urban comune (municipality) and a village in South Tyrol in northern Italy, located about 20 kilometres (12 mi) northeast of the city of Bolzano. It is one of I Borghi più belli d'Italia ("The most beautiful villages of Italy").

== Geography ==
As of 30 November 2010, it had a population of 5,144 and an area of 51.4 square kilometres (19.8 mi^{2}).

Klausen borders the following municipalities: Feldthurns, Lajen, Sarntal, Vahrn, Villanders and Villnöß.

=== Frazioni ===
The municipality of Klausen contains the frazioni (subdivisions, mainly villages and hamlets) Gufidaun (Gudon), Latzfons (Lazfons), and Verdings (Verdignes).

== History ==
Klausen is first mentioned in 1027, in a document issued by emperor Conrad II, as Clausa sub Sabiona sita, meaning chasm below the Säben Abbey.

=== Coat-of-arms ===
The emblem represents an argent dexter key on gules. The emblem was used as a seal from 1448, known from 1397 and granted in 1540 by Cardinal Bernhard von Cles, Bishop of Brixen.

== Society ==
=== Linguistic distribution ===
According to the 2024 census, 90.66% of the population speak German, 8.46% Italian and 0.87% Ladin as a first language.

=== Demographic evolution ===
Historical population
Year	Pop.	±% p.a.
1921	2,588	—
1931	3,218	+2.20%
1936	3,107	−0.70%
1951	3,344	+0.49%
1961	3,632	+0.83%
1971	3,958	+0.86%
1981	4,098	+0.35%
1991	4,284	+0.44%
2001	4,613	+0.74%

== Twin / associated cities ==
- Nuremberg (Germany) since 1970
- Planegg (Germany) since 2006
