= Trentino wine =

Italian wine produced in Trentino, Italy

Trentino-Alto Adige
- Wine region
- Type: Italian wine
- Year established: 1971
- Years of wine industry: 1971–present
- Country: Italy
- Soil conditions: Volcanic, alluvial, clay, limestone
- Grapes produced: 60% white varieties, 40% red varieties
- Varietals produced: Red: Lagrein, Schiava, Merlot, Cabernet Sauvignon, Pinot Noir; White: Gewürztraminer, Müller-Thurgau, Pinot Bianco, Sauvignon Blanc, Chardonnay
- Official designations: 1 DOCG: Trento DOC; 9 DOCs including Alto Adige DOC, Trentino DOC, Santa Maddalena; Several IGTs including Vigneti delle Dolomiti

Location of Trentino-Alto Adige wine region in Italy

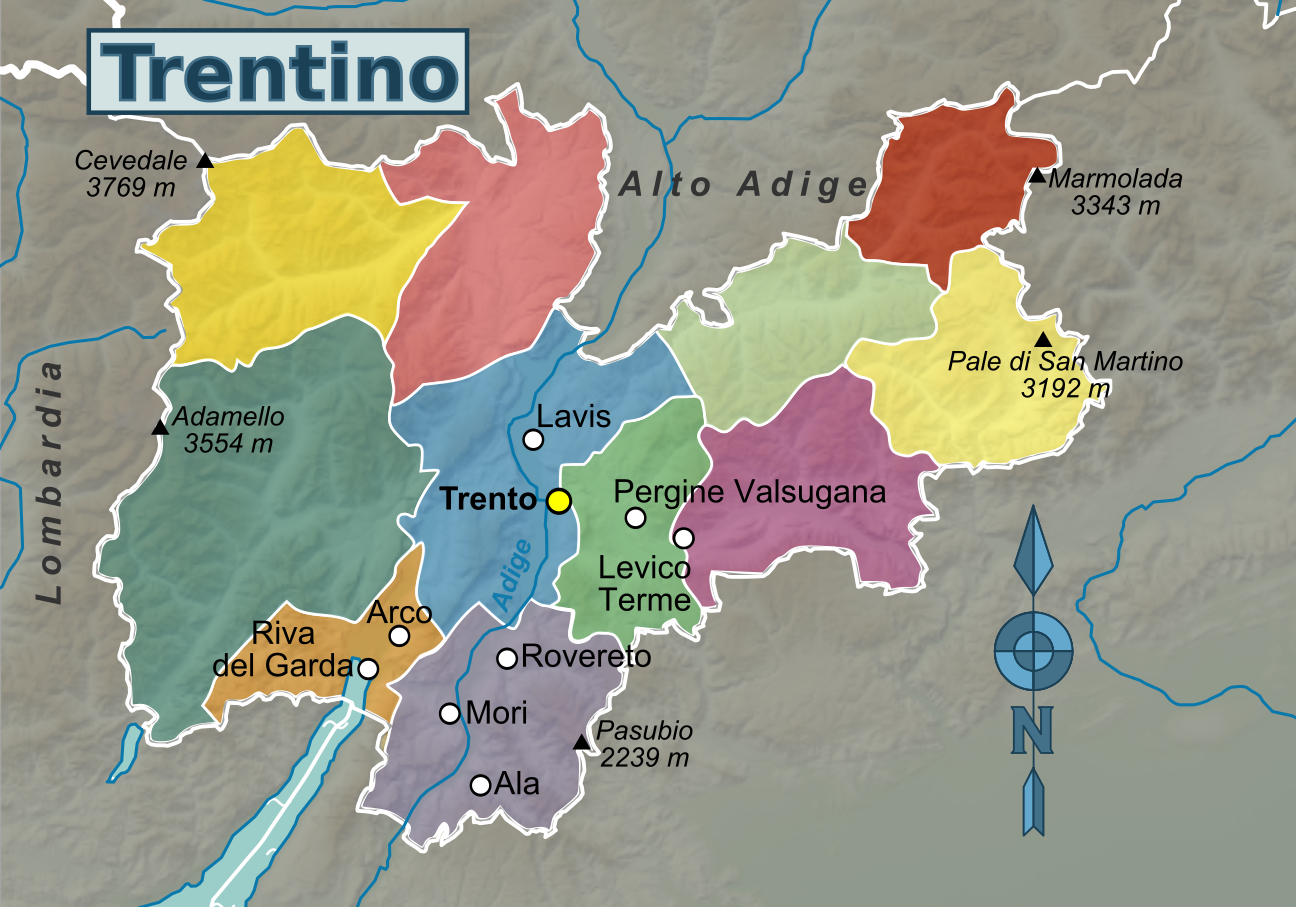
Trentino – the autonomous province of Trento

Trentino is the southern part of the Trentino-Alto Adige/Südtirol autonomous region of Italy. Wine is produced in Trentino from several grape varieties, including the native Nosiola, Teroldego, and Marzemino varieties. There are six wine DOC in Trentino.

== Winemaking ==
One main distinction between Trentino and South Tyrol wine production is the fact that in the northern area (South Tyrol) the wines are produced mostly by small family-owned and managed wineries that sell their high quality wine mainly locally with limited exports to Germany and Austria. Trentino on the other hand counts on a large number of growers who joined into large cooperatives, such as Cavit and Mezzacorona, which produce wines that have consistent taste and characteristics year after year. These wines are popular, both in Italy and abroad, among wine drinkers who look for reasonably good and affordable wines for daily enjoyment.

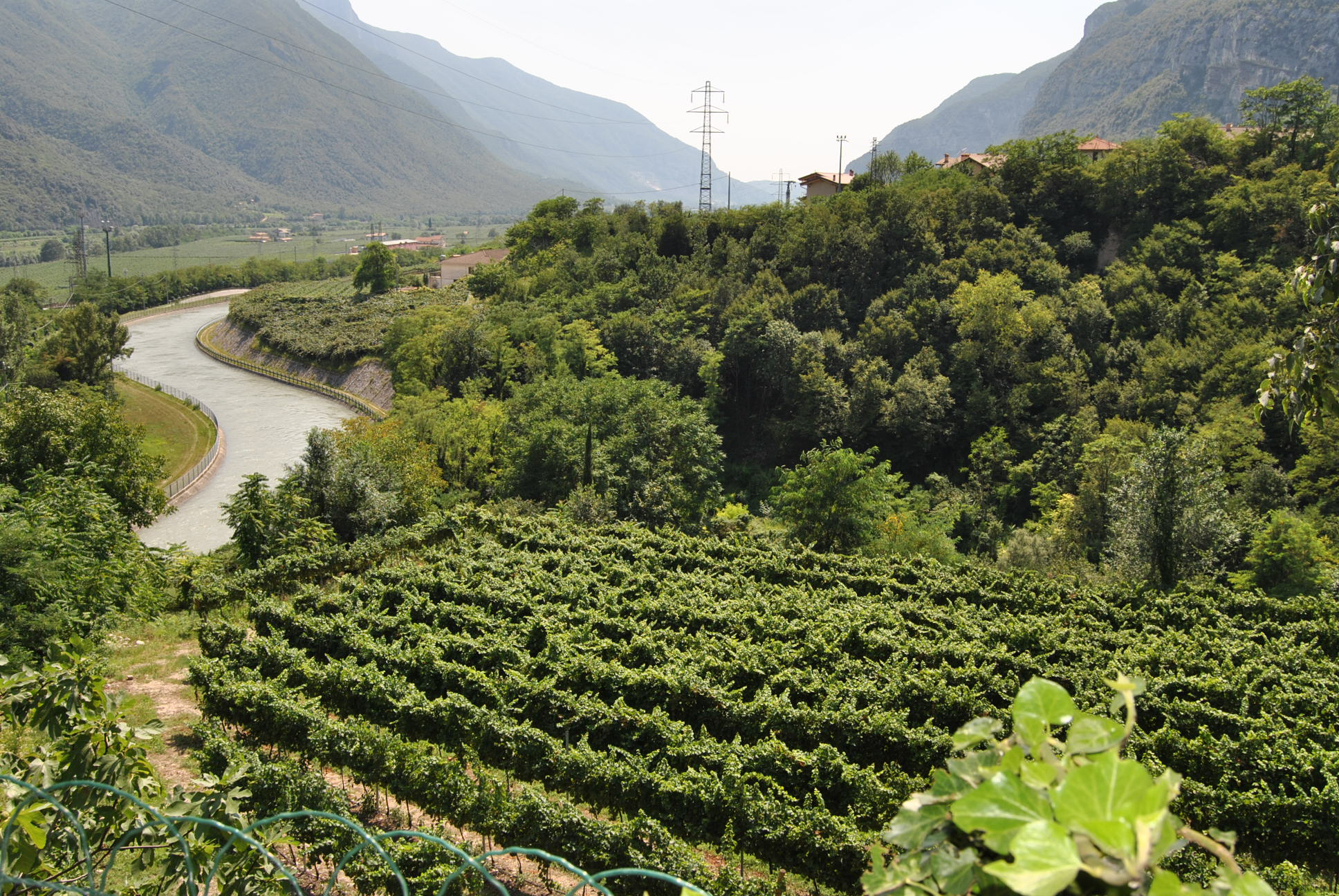
Vineyards in Valdadige DOC

== Varieties ==
Three grapes are native to this region: one is the white Nosiola and the other two are the red Teroldego Rotaliano and the Marzemino. Trentino D.O.C. Nosiola is made from the eponymous vine grown on the hillsides of Valle dei Laghi and Val di Cembra. Amongst other things, its partially dried grapes are used to make the Trentino DOC Vin Santo from Trentino. In addition to the native grapes, well known international grape varieties such as Chardonnay, Cabernet, Merlot, Moscato, Pinot nero and Pinot grigio, as well as Müller-Thurgau, are grown throughout the region.

== Trentino DOC regions ==
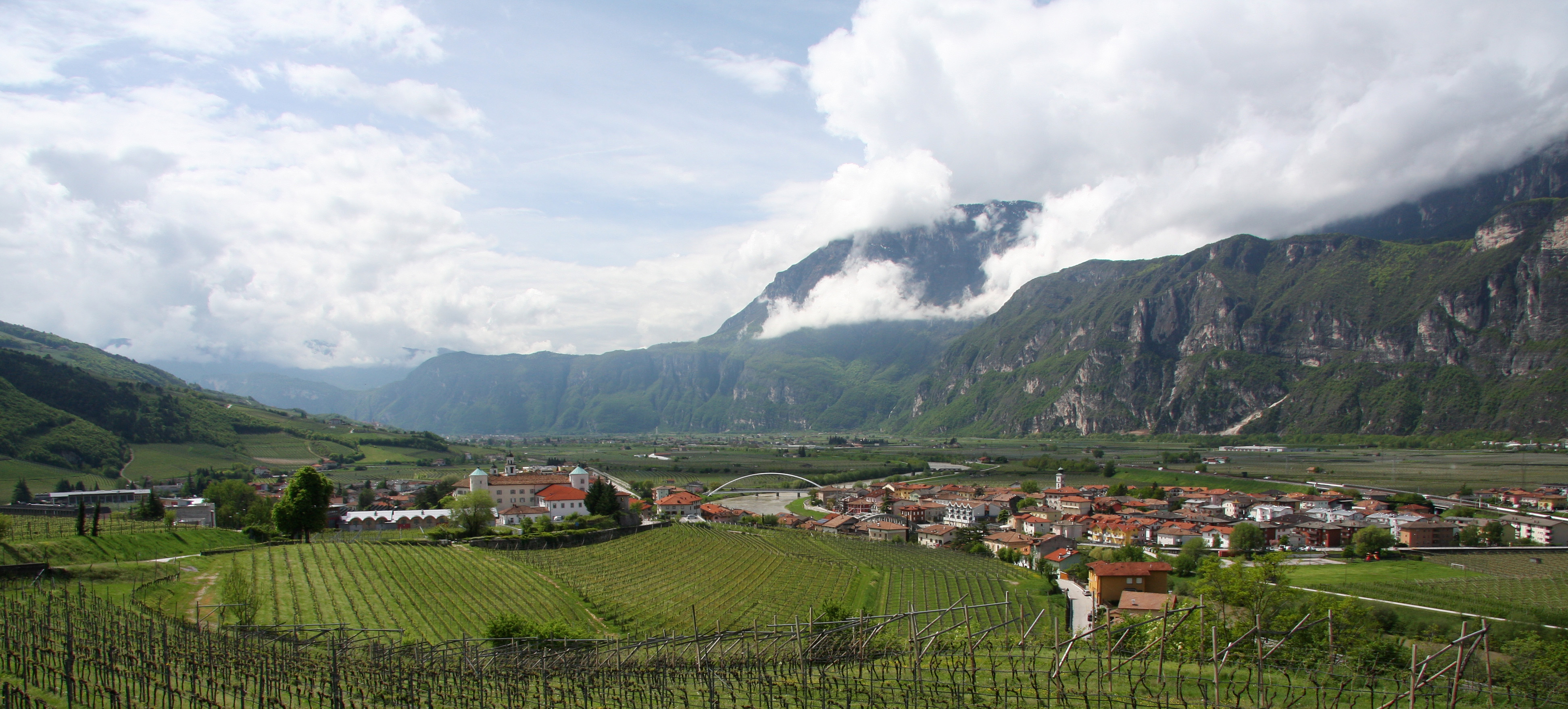
Landscape of the Trentino wine region

The following is a list of DOC in the Trentino region along with the grapes that may be included in the blend under varying percentages that are regulated under the DOC label.

- Casteller DOC – red wine blends produced from Merlot (at least 50%), Schiava, Lambrusco, Lagrein, and Teroldego.
- Sorni DOC – produced from Schiava, Teroldego, Lagrein, Nosiola, Müller-Thurgau, Sylvaner and Pinot Bianco.
- Teroldego Rotaliano DOC – produced from Teroldego.
- Trentino DOC – blends and varietal wines produced from Cabernet sauvignon, Cabernet Franc, Merlot, Chardonnay, Pinot bianco, Moscato, Müller-Thurgau, Nosiola, Pinot grigio, Riesling Italico, Riesling Renano, Traminer aromatico, Lagrein, Marzemino, and Pinot noir.
- Trento DOC – produced from Pinot nero, Chardonnay, Pinot bianco and Pinot Meunier.
- Valdadige DOC – shared with the Veneto wine region. Produced wines from Schiava, Lambrusco, Merlot, Pinot noir, Lagrein, Teroldego, Negrara, Pinot bianco, Pinot grigio, Riesling Italico, Rossignola, Müller-Thurgau, Chardonnay, Bianchetta, Trebbiano, Nosiola, Vernaccia, Sylvaner and Veltliner bianco.

== See also ==
- Edmund Mach Foundation – wine academy located in Trentino
