= Uva Tosca =

Variety of grape

Uva Tosca is a red Italian wine grape variety that is grown in the Emilia-Romagna region of east-central Italy, where it is the only grape variety able to grow in the higher elevations of the Val Secchia area. Despite what its name may allude to, ampelographers have little evidence to believe that the grape originated in Tuscany or has any close genetic relationship with the notable Tuscan wine grape, Sangiovese, that is also known under the synonym of Uva Tosca. In 2010, DNA analysis suggested that Uva Tosca may be a natural crossing between the Alto-Adige wine grape Schiava Grossa and Crepallocchi.

== History ==
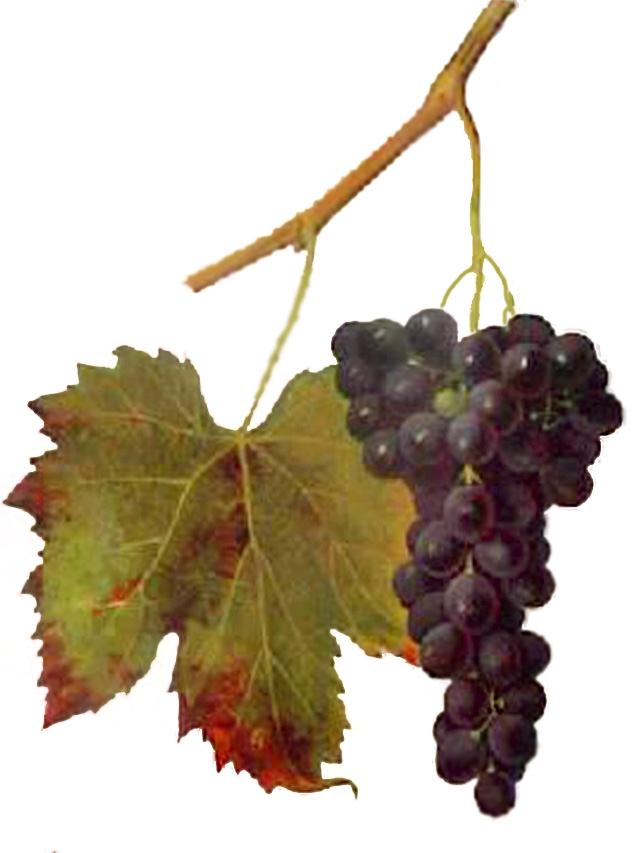
Schiava Grossa/Trollinger (pictured) is one of the likely parents of Uva Tosca.

Ampelographers believe that, despite its name, Uva Tosca originated in the Emilia-Romagna region where it was first described in 1644 by Italian agronomist Vincenzo Tanara. Tanara noted that the grape made pale-colored "reddish wine" that was very healthy to consume and somewhat sweet and spicy.

Another item casting doubt on a potential Tuscan origin is the lack of a close genetic relationship with the notable Tuscan wine grape Sangiovese, of which it shares the synonym of Uva Tosca, with instead DNA profiling suggesting that the grape is a natural crossing of the Alto-Adige wine grape Schiava Grossa and Crepallocchi. Additional DNA studies also found that Uva Tosca may be one of the parent varieties of the Emilia-Romagna grape Lambrusco Monterico, one of the many varieties in the Lambrusco family that can be used to produce the wine of the same name.

== Viticulture ==
Uva Tosca is a mid to late-ripening grape vine that is very susceptible to the viticultural hazards of powdery mildew and millerandage. Uva Tosca seems to thrive at higher altitude plantings, being one of the few red Italian grape varieties that can fully ripen at elevations between 700 metres (2,300 ft) to 900 metres (3,000 ft) above sea levels.

== Wine regions ==
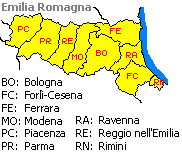
The vast majority of plantings of Uva Tosca are in the Emilia-Romagna region.

In 2000, there were 115 hectares (280 acres) of Uva Tosca planted in Italy, the vast majority of it in the provinces of Modena, Ravenna and Reggio Emilia. Historically, the grape was often planted at the higher elevation in the foothills of the Apennines where it was one of the few red wine grapes that could reliably ripen. But in the mid to late 20th century, plantings of Uva Tosca were brought down to the plains along the Secchia river valley and other tributaries in the Po Valley.

While permitted in several Denominazione di Origine Controllata (DOC) and Indicazione geografica tipica (IGT), the grape is rarely seen as a varietal and is mostly used a minor blending component.

== Synonyms ==
Over the years, Uva Tosca has been known under a variety of synonyms, including Montanara, Tosca and Tosco.
