= Baron Longo estate =

Wine estate in Italy

Coordinates: 46.3135007°N 11.272532°E

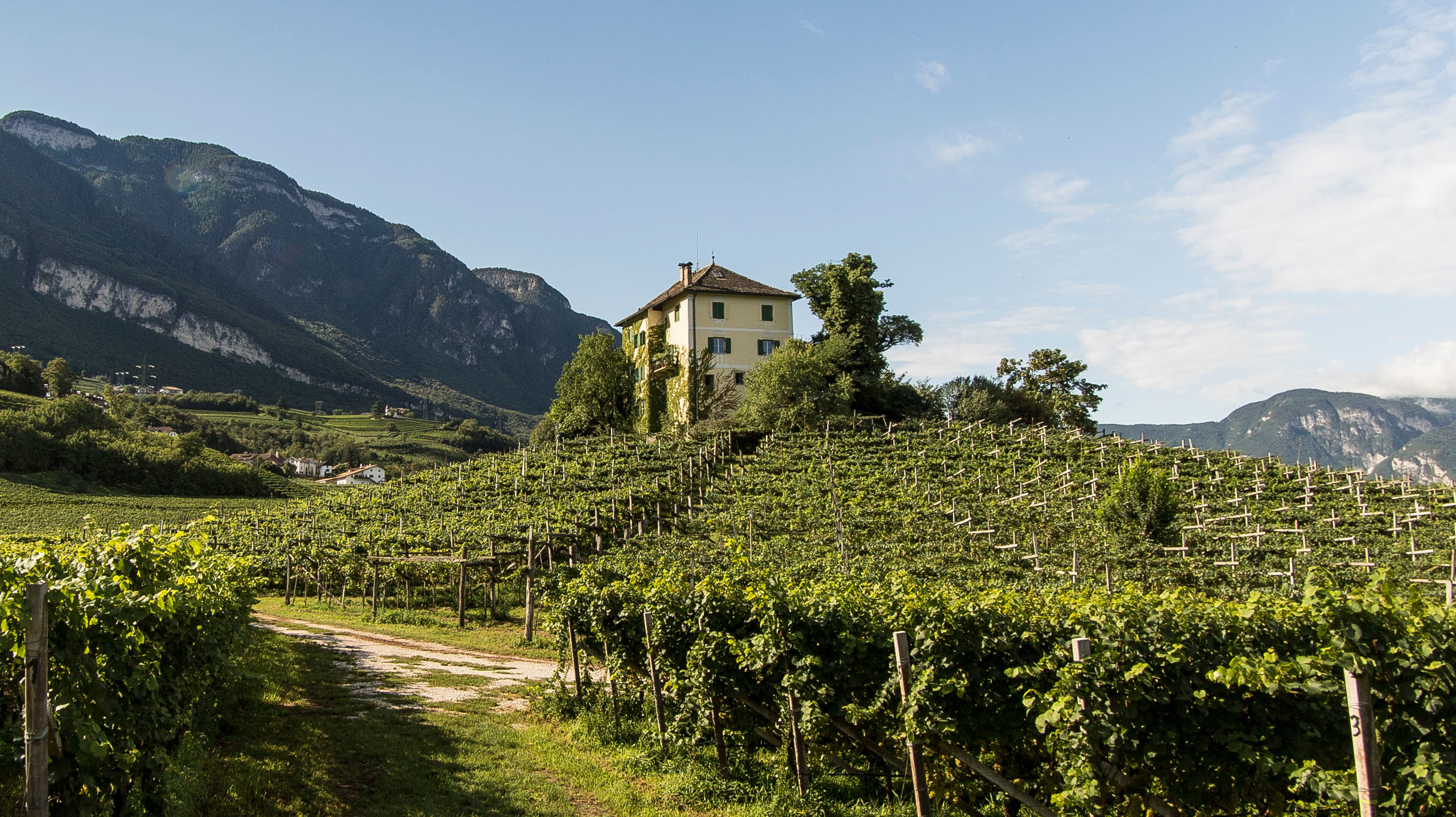
The Baron Longo estate in Neumarkt, Alto Adige, Villner Schlössl

The Baron Longo estate in Neumarkt (Egna) on the River Adige is a wine estate in the “Bassa Atesina“ wine-growing region in Italy. The winery is managed by Anton von Longo-Liebenstein, who represents the new generation of the family.

== Location and head office of the estate ==
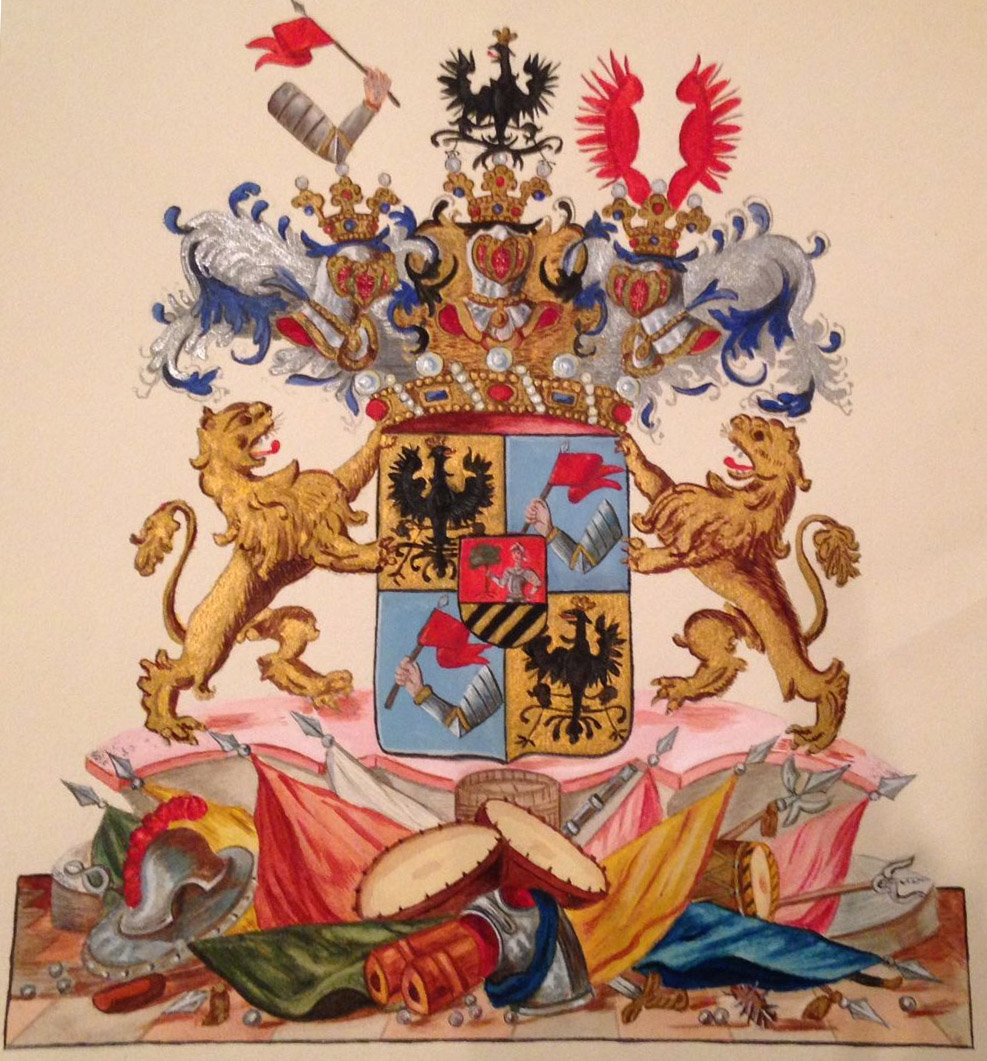
Escutcheon Longo-Liebesstein

The Baron Longo estate stretches east of the River Adige from the neighbourhood of Neumarkt known as Villa across Montagna and into Neumarkt town centre. Neumarkt mostly lies at the base of former branches of a glacier. The region's complex soil is rich in porphyry and limestone. Key parts of the estate are the Villner Schlössl in the neighbourhood of Villa and the 18th century Palais Longo in Egna. Both of these buildings have been listed since 1949.

=== The Villner Schlössl ===
The three-storey château Villner Schlössl stands out in its prominent position on top of a cone-shaped vineyard in the Villa neighbourhood of Neumarkt. A vineyard surrounds the building in concentric circles, with the vines extending to the foot of the vineyard and beyond. The Villner Schlössl has gained in international recognition in recent years as it is used as a motif in international advertising campaigns for Alto Adige.

=== Palais Longo ===
The Baron Longo estate's wine cellar is located in the Palais Longo. Parts of the historic wine cellar have been preserved to the present day, although the majority of it was redesigned in 2015.

The “Palais Longo” manor house, which attained its current form in the first half of the 18th century, is located just outside the centre of Neumarkt on the River Adige. The listed building has been owned by the Baron Longo family for almost 250 years and still conveys a sense of the noble lifestyle during the Ancien Régime. The façade of the Palais Longo is simple and regular in design. Twin flights of steps lead to a baroque entrance with a distinctive stone frame decorated with two cherubs and a female bust.

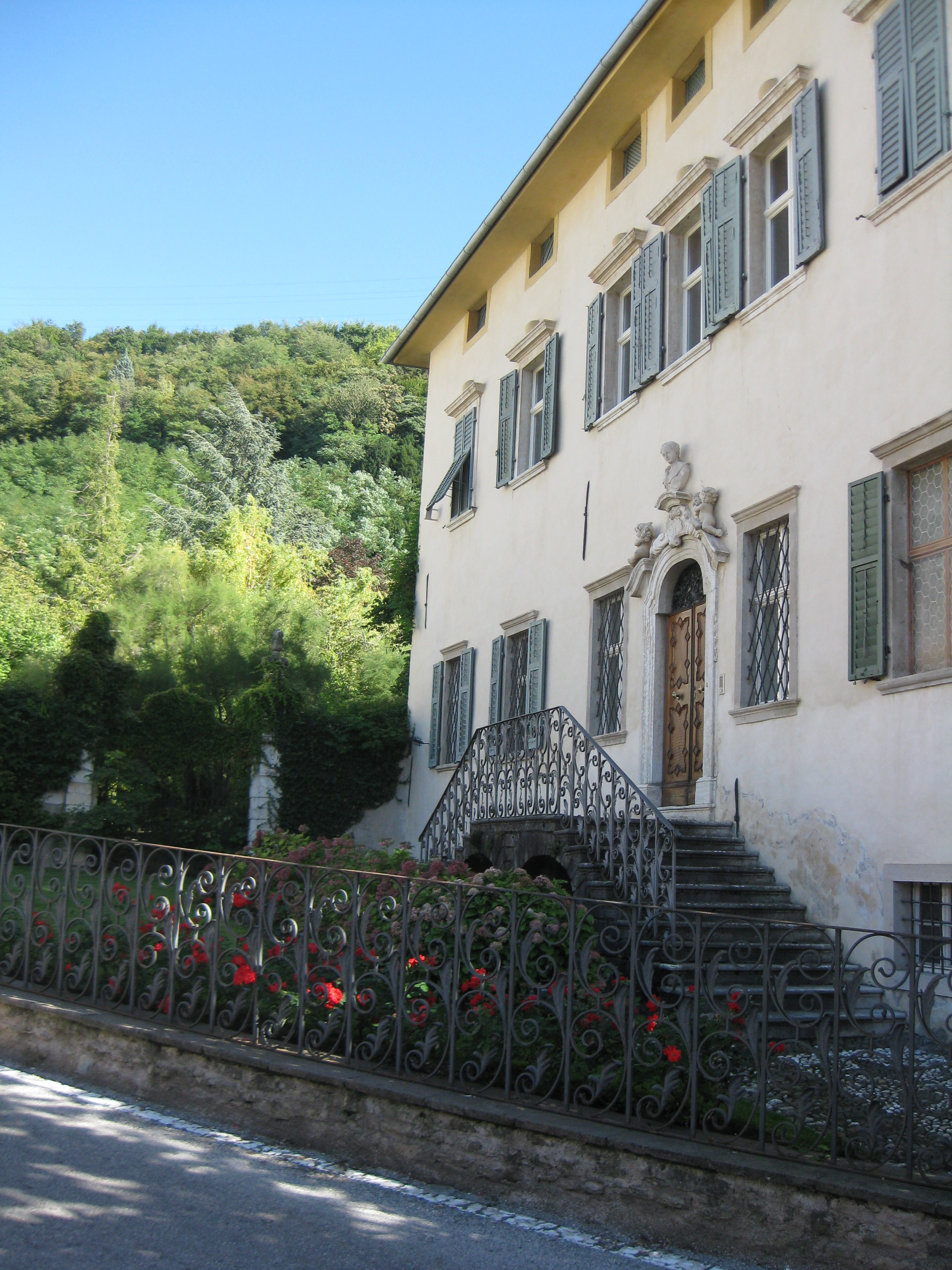
The Baron Longo estate in Egna, Alto Adige; Palais Longo

The interior boasts stucco decoration, painted wallpaper and ceiling paintings depicting events from the Old Testament, hunting scenes and images from Greek mythology including the abduction of Orithyia by Boreas. There are also high relief works in stucco by Franz Hannibal Bittner and frescos by Giacomo Antonio Delai. In the manor house's ballroom, there are a total of eleven ceiling paintings, the largest of which depicts the Gigantomachy. The whole of this ballroom features evidence of the Rococo period in Bassa Atesina. The palais also has a magnificent park that stretches from Palais Longo to the forest on the outskirts of Neumarkt.

== History ==
The name of the estate goes back to Johannes Dominikus Longo, who was raised to the ranks of the nobility by the Tyrolean Archduke Ferdinand Charles in 1656. In around 1770, the Baron Longo family acquired the first areas of land that are now part of the current wine estate as well as the Villner Schlössl and the Palais Longo in Neumarkt.

=== The 19th century ===
At the start of the 19th century, the estate in Neumarkt was one of the places where the family resided alongside Innsbruck and Klagenfurt. Felix Freiherr von Longo-Liebenstein (1803-1881) took over the Alto Adige estate in 1849. The lawyer was also president of both the Carinthian regional parliament and the District Court of Klagenfurt.

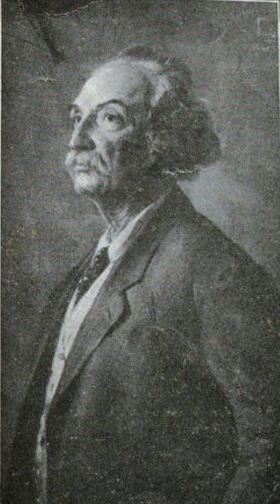
Dr. Anton von Longo-Liebenstein (1853-1925)

His son Dr Anton Freiherr von Longo-Liebenstein (1853-1925), a fully qualified doctor from Klagenfurt, moved from Klagenfurt to Alto Adige in the 1890s, where he took on the management of the wine estate. As well as his agricultural work, he was a municipal councillor in Neumarkt and a member of the Tyrolean regional parliament.

With the opening of the Brennero Railway in 1867 and the Val Pusteria railway in 1871, larger quantities of wine from Alto Adige could be transported greater distances. In this pioneering period of the Alto Adige wine business, during which Alto Adige wine became increasingly well known beyond the state borders, Anton Freiherr von Longo-Liebenstein started to sell wine in barrels and bottles from the streets of Klagenfurt in around 1880. Owing to increasing sales, he finally opened a wine inn. This was in operation from around 1900 to the 1960s and went by the name “Longo’s Eigenbau Weinstube” or “Longo’s Tiroler Eigenbau Weinstube”.

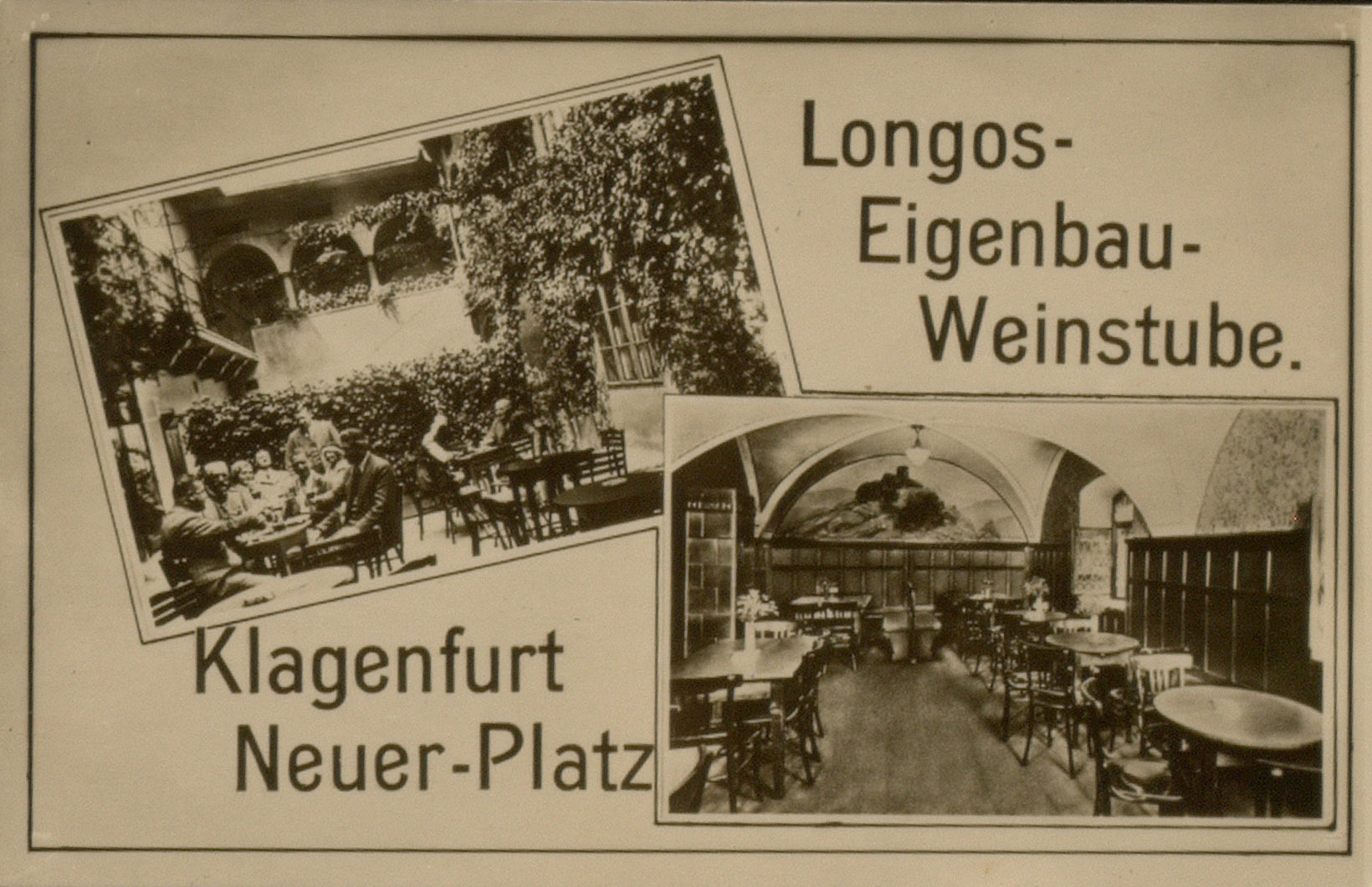
Longo's Tiroler Eigenbau Weinstube Klagenfurt, alter Platz

Single-varietal Baron Longo wines from Neumarkt were the main wines on offer. The Welschriesling, Negrara Trentina, Teroldego, Rossara Trentina, Erdbeertraube (strawberry grape), white Schiava and Pinot Noir varieties were particularly popular. The business also sold grapes from the Longo estate. The premises of “Longo’s Eigenbau Weinstube” with the old vault and inner courtyard have been preserved to this day. The historical building is now home to the “Hofbräu zum Lindwurm” inn.

=== The 20th century ===
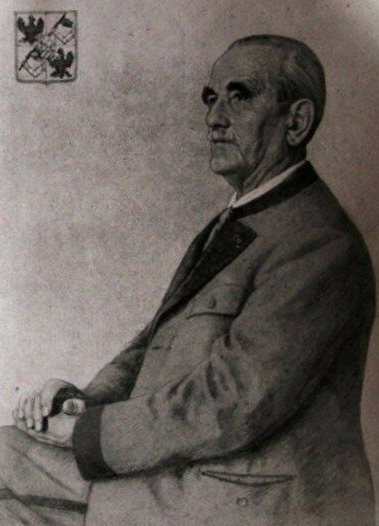
Felix von Longo-Liebenstein (1888-1961)

Alto Adige fell to the Kingdom of Italy at the end of the First World War. In October 1922, the Italian King Vittorio Emanuele handed over the government to the Italian fascists under Benito Mussolini. One year later, Anton Freiherr von Longo-Liebenstein and his son Felix (1888-1961) had to leave Egna for Klagenfurt because of an expulsion decree. Felix von Longo-Liebenstein became mayor^{[3]} of the municipality of Krumpendorf am Wörthersee in 1928. He performed his duty as mayor until 1932.

It was only in September 1932 that the family was able to move back to the Baron Longo estate in Alto Adige. The following generations supplied the majority of the grape harvest to neighbouring wine-making cooperatives. The traditional single-varietal Baron Longo wines were produced exclusively for their own consumption from the 1950s up until 2015.

=== The estate today ===
Anton von Longo-Liebenstein acquired the estate from his father Felix in 2012. The 2015 vintage was vinified by the estate rather than sold to other local wineries for vinification.

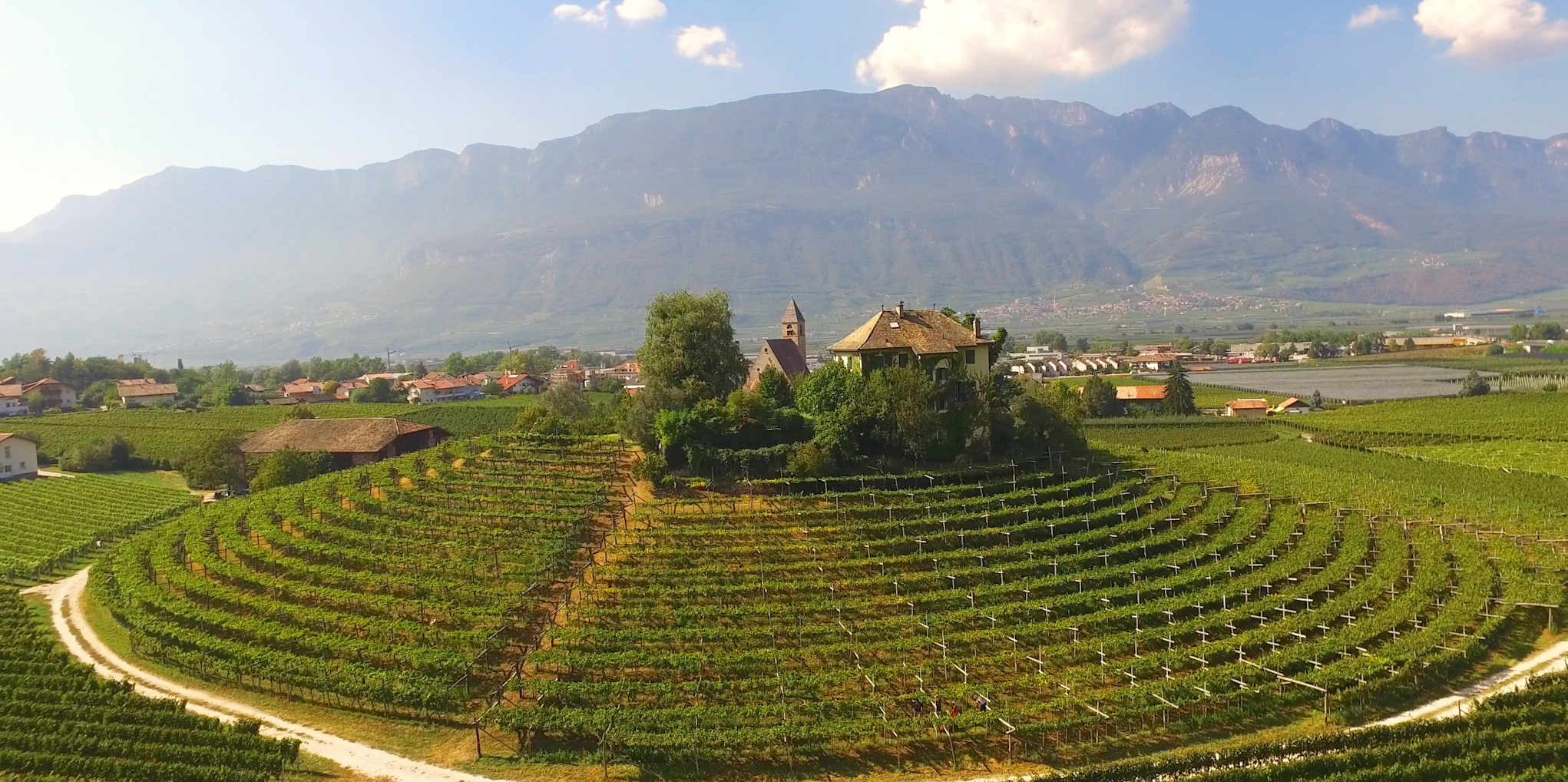
Villner Schlössl, Baron Longo estate

Today, the Baron Longo estate has an acreage of approximately 20 hectares and only uses grapes from its own cultivation. Anton von Longo-Liebenstein is a member of the Independent Winegrowers of Alto Adige and the Federazione Italiana Vignaioli Indipendenti (FIVI), the association of independent Italian winegrowers.

== Wine-making ==
According to Jancis Robinson, as of 2025 the estate was certified biodynamic.

The fermentation process takes place in open wooden tubs and stainless steel tanks. The wine is matured in oak and tonneau barrels made from French oak with a capacity of 225 or 500 litres.

== Selection of wines ==
- DOP Alto Adige Pinot Bianco
- DOP Südt. Gewürztraminer
- DOP Südt. Chardonnay
- DOP Südt. Pinot gris
- DOP Südt. Lagrein Riserva
- DOP Südt. Merlot Riserva
- DOP Südt. Cabernet Sauvignon Riserva

== Recognition ==
In 2024 European viticulture magazine Vinum named Baron Longo South Tyrol's Rising Winery of the Year.

== Gallery ==
Anton Felix von Longo-Liebenstein inspecting wine in the cellar

Villner Schlössl

Palais Longo in Neumarkt

Vineyard at Gschnon
