= Hudler =

Hudler is a German language occupational surname, which means "rag trader", derived from the Middle High German hudel ("rag"). The name may refer to:

- Jiří Hudler (born 1984), Czech ice hockey player
- Rex Hudler (born 1960), American baseball player and commentator

== See also ==
- Hudler (grape), another name for the German/Italian wine grape Trollinger
