= Trollinger =

Variety of grape

- Grape (Vitis)
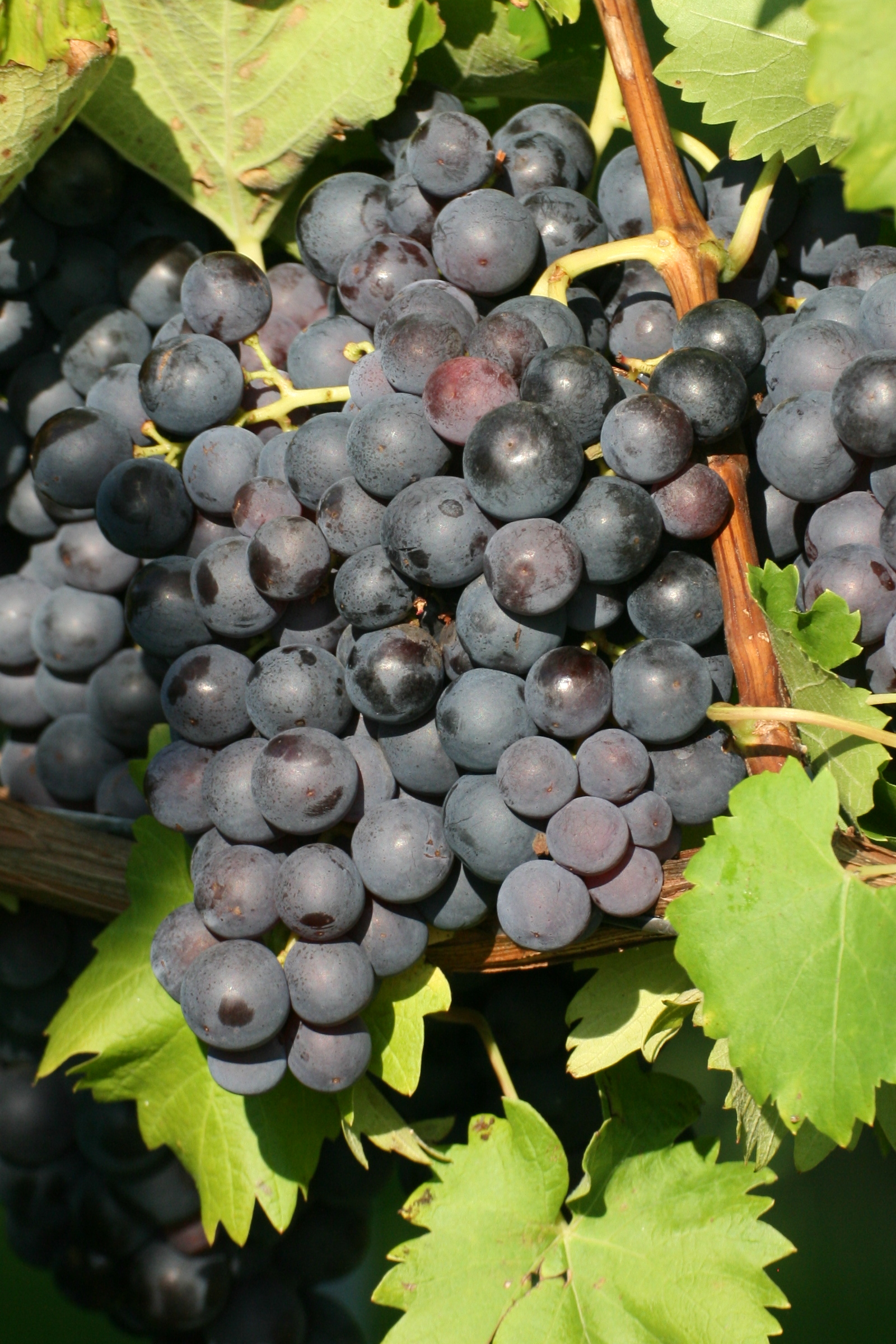
- Species: Vitis vinifera
- Also called: Schiava
- Origin: Italy?
- Notable regions: Württemberg (Germany), Trentino, South Tyrol (Italy)
- VIVC number: 10823

Trollinger, Schiava, or Vernatsch, is a red German/Italian wine grape variety that was likely originally cultivated in the wine regions of South Tyrol and Trentino, but today is almost exclusively cultivated on steep, sunny locations in the Württemberg wine region of Baden-Württemberg. It is primarily known under the synonyms Trollinger in Germany, Vernatsch in South Tyrol and Schiava in other Italian regions. As a table grape the variety is sometimes known as Black Hamburg, which is commonly confused with the similar synonym for Black Muscat—a variety that is actually a cross of Trollinger and Muscat of Alexandria.

According to wine expert Oz Clarke, Trollinger has moderate acidity and tends to produce light bodied wines with fruity strawberry and subtle smokey notes.

== History ==
While the grape is likely northern Italian in origin, the synonym Schiava is closely related to the Italian word for "Slave" and may hint to the type of vine plant in Roman times (forced by pruning). Records show that the grape has been growing in the Trentino-Alto Adige region since at least the 13th century. The German synonym Trollinger appears to be a corruption of the word Tirolinger meaning "of Tyrol". The synonym Vernatsch appears to have a similar origin as Vernaccia in having the same root word as "vernacular" or "local". British Master of Wine Nicolas Belfrage has interpreted this association as further evidence that the grape likely originated in the South Tyrol/Alto Adige region.

At some point the grape migrated northwards to the southern regions of Germany, though the exact date of its arrival is unknown. In Württemberg, viticulture has existed since at least the 8th century when monks from Burgundy established monasteries and vineyards in the region. In nearby Lauffen am Neckar, it was established even earlier during Roman times, but the earliest records for Trollinger growing in the Württemberg region can only be traced back to 14th century.

== Sub-varieties and crossings ==
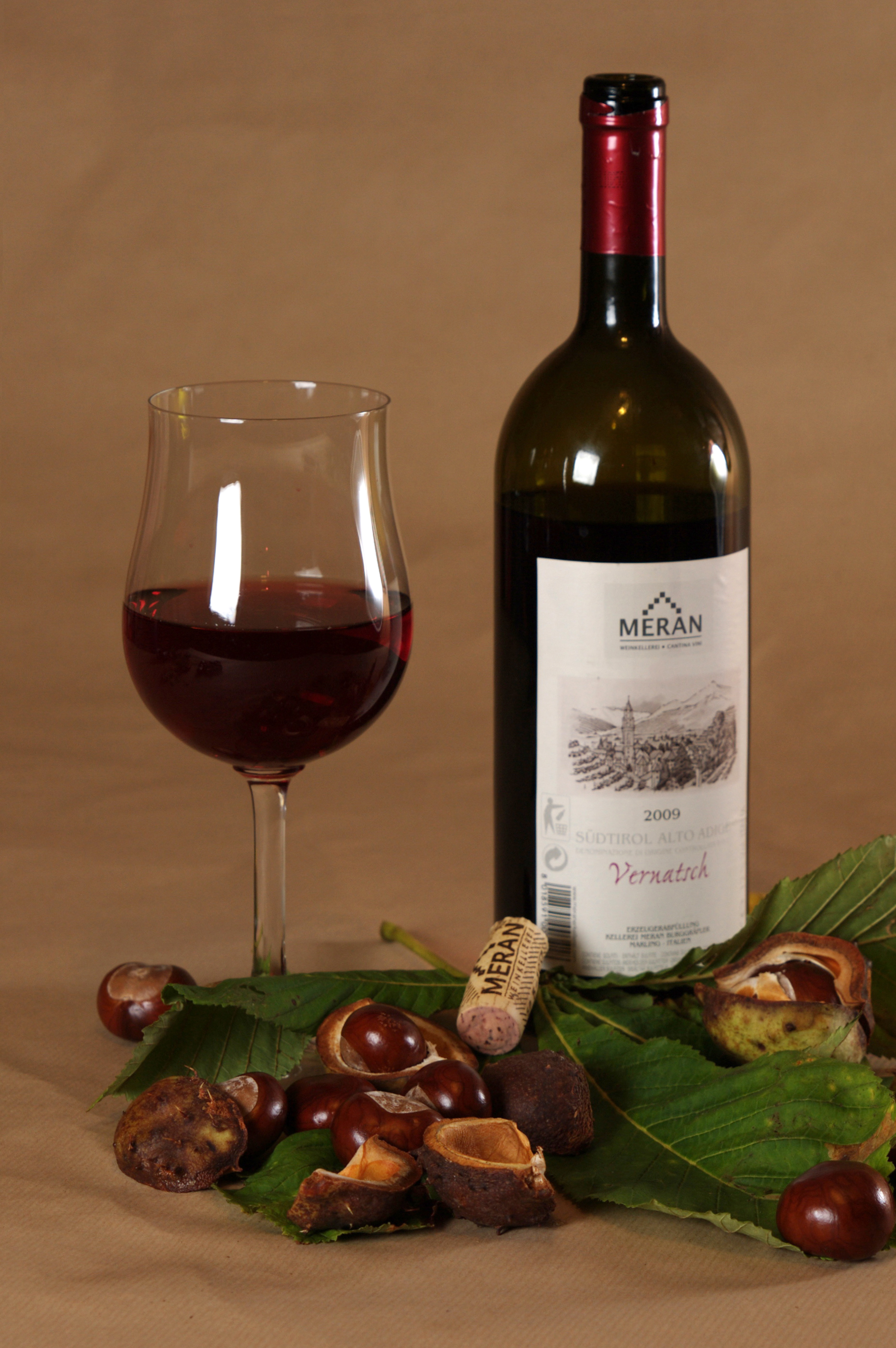
An Italian Vernatsch from South Tyrol.

In the Trentino-Alto Adige region, several sub-varieties or clones of Trollinger have been identified. These include the large berry Schiava Grossa (also known as Grossvernatsch and Schiava Grigia) which is probably the highest yielding clone, but tends to produce light bodied and neutral tasting wine, the smaller berry Schiava Gentile (also known as Kleinvernatsch), which tends to produce more aromatic wines and Tschaggle, which is the lowest yielding clone, but often produces the most critically acclaimed wines. Other known clones include Schiava Media and Schiava Piccola.

In Württemberg, Trollinger was crossed with the white grape Riesling to produce the cross Kerner in 1929 (received varietal protection and was released for general cultivation in 1969). The new crossing was named after the local poet and medical writer, Justinus Kerner. The variety was also crossed with Muscat of Alexandria to produce Black Muscat.

In 2010, DNA analysis suggested that the Emilia-Romagna wine grape Uva Tosca may be a natural crossing between Trollinger/Schiava Grossa and Crepallochi.

== Viticulture and confusion with other grapes ==
Trollinger is a late ripening variety, often ripening and being harvested much later than Riesling.

In the Trento province, Trollinger is sometimes confused with the Italian/Slovenian wine grape Piccola nera.

== Wine regions ==
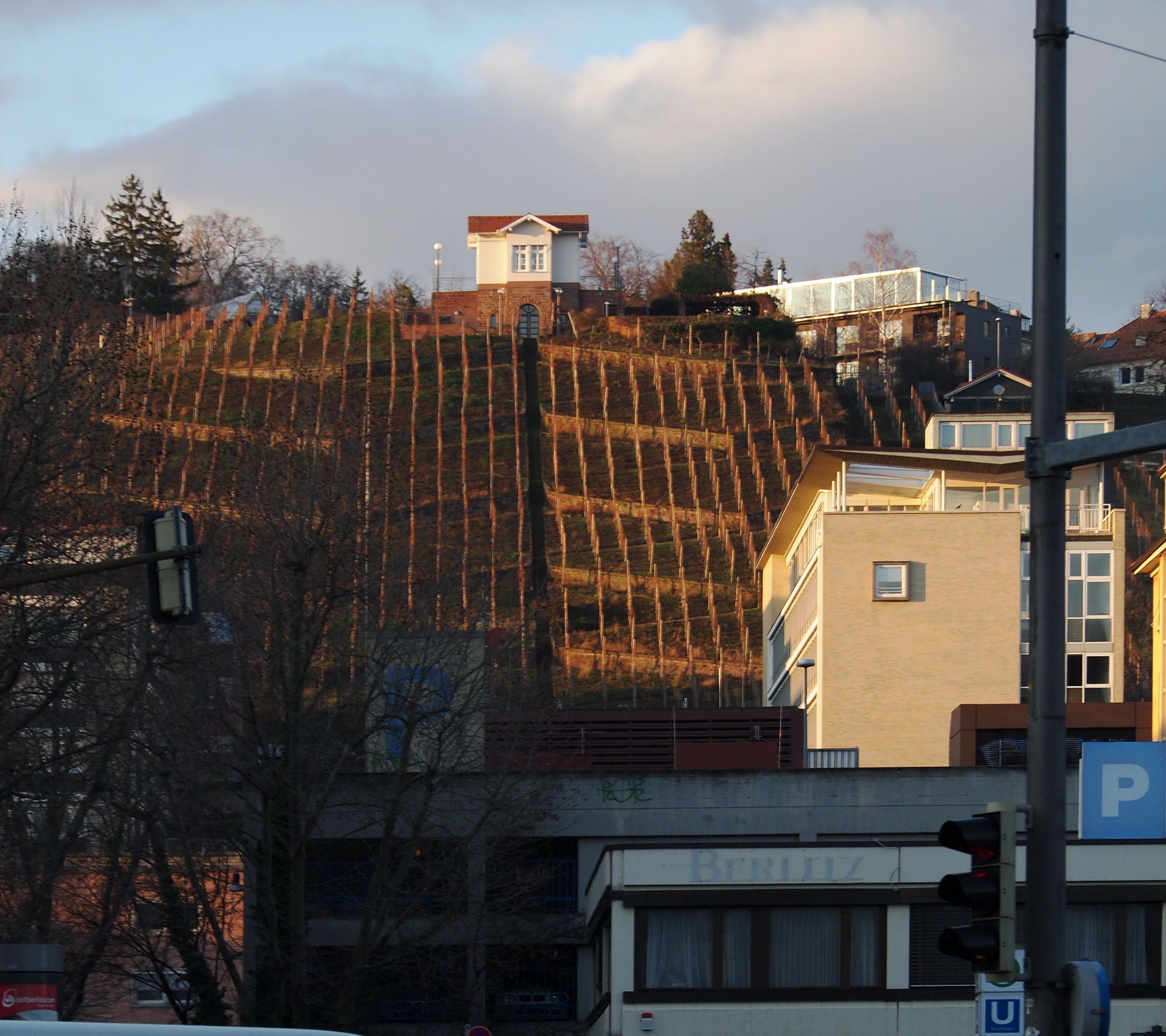
Trollinger vineyard in the city center of Stuttgart

=== Germany ===
The vast majority of the nearly 2,300 hectares (5,700 acres) of Trollinger in Germany are grown in the Württemberg around the town of Stuttgart and throughout the Neckar valley. The region is the fifth largest in Germany with nearly a third of all plantings in Württemberg being Trollinger. While there are several clones of the variety in Italy, nearly all of the Trollinger found in Germany is the high yielding Schiava Grossa clone. Here the grape is often blended with Lemberger.

=== Italy ===
In Italy it is a permitted variety in several Denominazione di Origine Controllata (DOC)s including the Santa Maddalena DOC located east of the city of Bolzano in the South Tyrol/Alto Adige region. There the grape must make up a minimum of 90% of the blend with Lagrein and Pinot noir permitted to round out the remaining 10%. Grapes are limited to a yield of 12.5 tonnes/hectare with the finished wine needing to attain a minimum alcohol level of 11.5%. Some producers use the German name "Saint Magdalener" on the wine labels.

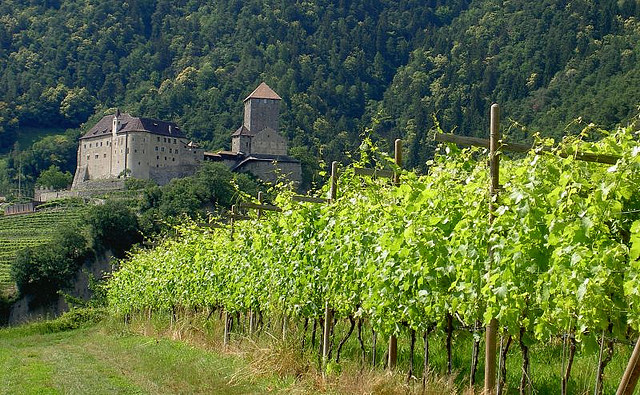
Vernatsch vineyard in the Trentino-South Tyrol region of Italy.

Other Italian DOCs where Trollinger/Schiava/Vernatsch is a permitted variety include:

- Alto Adige DOC – Varietal label Schiava must have a minimum 95% of the variety from grapes harvested limited to 14 tonnes/ha with the finished wine having a minimum alcohol level of 10.5%.
- Caldaro DOC – Also known as Kalterer See/Lago di Caldaro. Minimum 85% Schiava with Pinot noir and Lagrein permitted up to 15% from grapes harvested limited to 14 tonnes/ha with the finished wine having a minimum alcohol level of 10.5%. A classico bottling can be made from grapes grown around the communes of Caldaro, Appiano, Termeno, Cortaccia, Vadena, Egna, Montagna, Ora and Bronzolo. A superiore bottling (labeled as Scelto or Selezionato) can also be made from the classico area provided the finished wine has a minimum alcohol level of 11%.
- Casteller DOC – A multi-grape blend from this DOC near the border of the province of Verona. Schiava must account for a minimum of 30% of the blend up to 40% Lambrusco, 30% Merlot and 10% other red grape varieties. Yields are limited to 13.5 tonnes/ha with the finished wine needing to attain a minimum alcohol level of 11%.
- Colli di Bolzano DOC – Schiava must account for a minimum 90% of the blend with Lagrein and Pinot noir permitted to fill in the remaining 10%. Yields are limited to 13 tonnes/ha with the finished wine needing to attain a minimum alcohol level of 11%.
- Meranese di Collina DOC – 100% Schiava but usually a field blend of several clones including Grossa, Gentile and Tschaggle. Yields are limited to 12.5 tonnes/ha with the finished wine needing to attain a minimum alcohol level of 10.5%. A special bottling known as Bulgraviato or Burggräfler can be produced from grapes grown around the Castello di Tirolo in the high altitude hills around the town of Merano.
- Meraner Schickenburg DOC
- Sorni DOC – Minimum 70% Schiava with Teroldego permitted to make up 20-30% of the blend with up to a maximum 10% Lagrein. Yields are limited to 14 tonnes/ha with the finished wine needing to attain a minimum alcohol level of 10.5%. A special "riserva" or scelto bottling can be made if the finished wine attains a minimum alcohol level of 11%.
- Valdadige DOC – A multi-grape blend from a DOC that extends into the Veneto wine region and includes the provinces of Verona, Bolzano and Trento with most of the Schiava grown in Bolzano and Trento. The Rosso must contain at least 20% Schiava but not more than 30% with Lambrusco permitted up to fill the remaining 10%. The remaining 70–80% is composed of Negrara, Merlot, Pinot noir, Lagrein and Teroldego. A rosé can also be made using the same varieties and permitted percentages. A varietal Schiava can also be made with a minimum 85% of the grape with the other noted red grape varieties permitted to fill in the remainder of the wine. Yields are limited to 14 tonnes/ha with the finished red wine needing to attain a minimum alcohol level of 11% and finished rosé needing to attain 10.5%.

== Wine styles ==
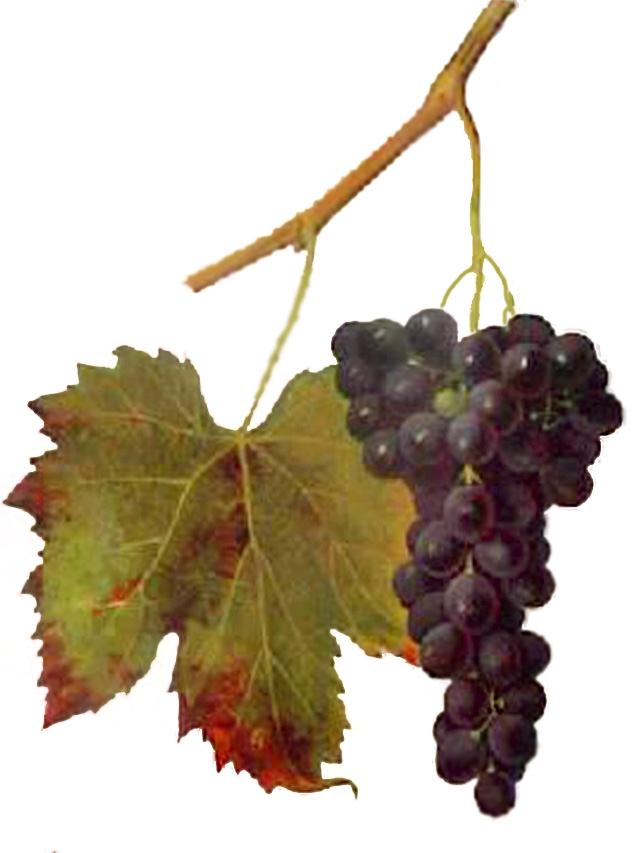
Schiava from an early 20th-century ampelography text.

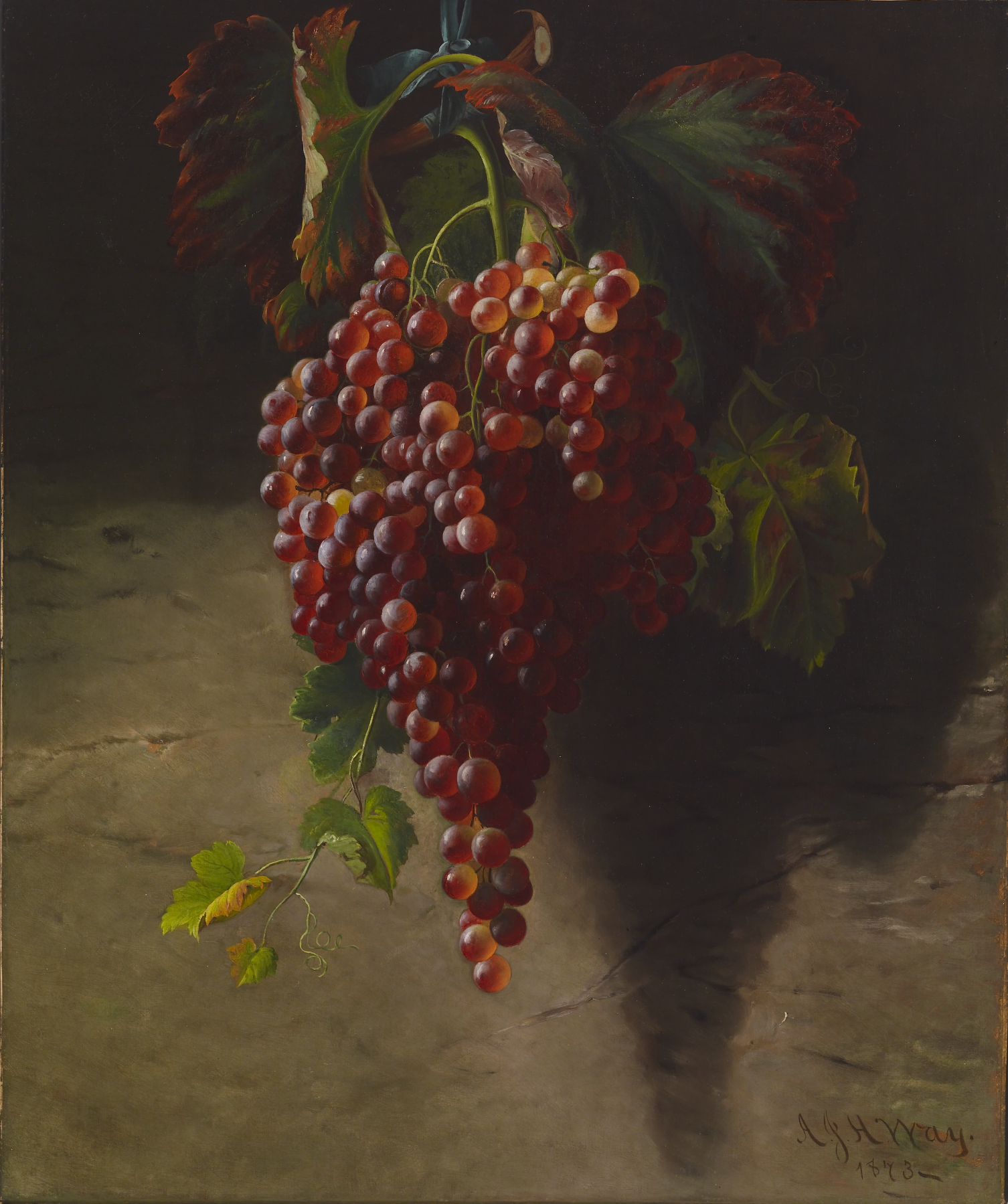
The grapes in this painting have been identified as the Prince Albert variety or Trollinger. The Walters Art Museum.

The wine produced from the grape is mostly red, though some dark color rosé styles are also produced. In Württemberg, the wine is often slightly sweet with some residual sugar left over after fermentation is completed. Most wines produced from Trollinger are often consumed very young, usually within a year of the vintage date. Italian styles of Schiava tend to be similarly light but are more often dryer and more noticeably acidic.

== Synonyms ==
In addition to Schiava and Vernatsch, Trollinger has several synonyms that the grape variety has been known under. These include: Admiral, Ägypter, Ägyptische, Ägyptischer, Aleksandriskii chernyi, Baccaria, Bacheracher, Bammerer, Barth der Alte, Bilsenroth, Black Gibraltar, Black Hambourg, Black Hamburg, Black Hamburgh, Black Prince, Black Tripoli, Blauer Trollinger, Blauwälsche, Bocksauge, Bocksaugen, Bocksbeutel, Bockshoden, Bockstraube, Braddick's Seedling, Bruxelloise, Chasselas bleu de Windsor, Chasselas de Jérusalem, Chasselas de Windsor, Dachtraube, Dachtrauben, Dutch Hamburgh, Edel Vernatsch, Edelvernatsch, Fleischtraube, Frankentaler, Frankenthal, Frankenthal noir, Frankenthaler, Garston Black Hamburgh, Gelbholziger schwarzblauer Trollinger, Gelbholziger Trollinger, Gros bleu, Gros noir, Gros plant grand noir, Gross Italiener, Gross Vernatsch, Grosse race, Grosser Burgunder, Grossroth, Grossschwarzer, Grossvernatsch, Hammelshoden, Hammelsschelle, Hammelssohlen, Hampton Court Vine, Hudler, Huttler, Imperator, Khei-Khan, Knevet's Black Hamburgh, Kölner Blau, Kreuzertraube, Lambert, Lamper, Languedoc, Lombard, Lugiana near, Maltheser Roth, Malvasier, Malvoisier, Maroquin d’Espagne, Meraner Kurtraube, Ministra, Modri Tirolan, Mohrendutte, Mohrentutte, Morrokin Barbaron, Nougaret grosse race, Pfundtraube, Plant de Paris, Pommerer, Pope Hamburgh, Prince Albert, Purple Hamburgh, Queen Victoria, Raisin bleu, Raisin bleu de Frankental, Raisin de Languedoc, Red Hamburgh, Rheinwein blau, Richmond Villa Hamburgh, Rothelbner, Salisbury violette, Schiavone, Schiavone di Merano nero, Schliege, Schwarzblauer, Schwarzblauer Trollinger, Schwarzer, Schwarzer Wälscher, Schwarzwälscher, Spanisch Blau, Straihntraube, Südtiroler Kurtrauben, Teplichnyi chernyi, Tirolan crni, Tirolinger, Trolinger, Troller, Trollinger blau, Trollinger gelbholzig, Trollinger weissholzig, Trollingi kék, Tschaggele, Uva Cenerente, Uva meranese, Uva near d’Amburgo, Valentines, Victoria, Victoria Hamburgh, Wälscher, Warner's Hamburgh, Weissholziger Trollinger, Welke Burgundske, Welko modre, Zottelwälscher and Zottler.
