= Ferrari Trento =

Italian sparkling wine producer

Ferrari F.lli Lunelli S.p.A.
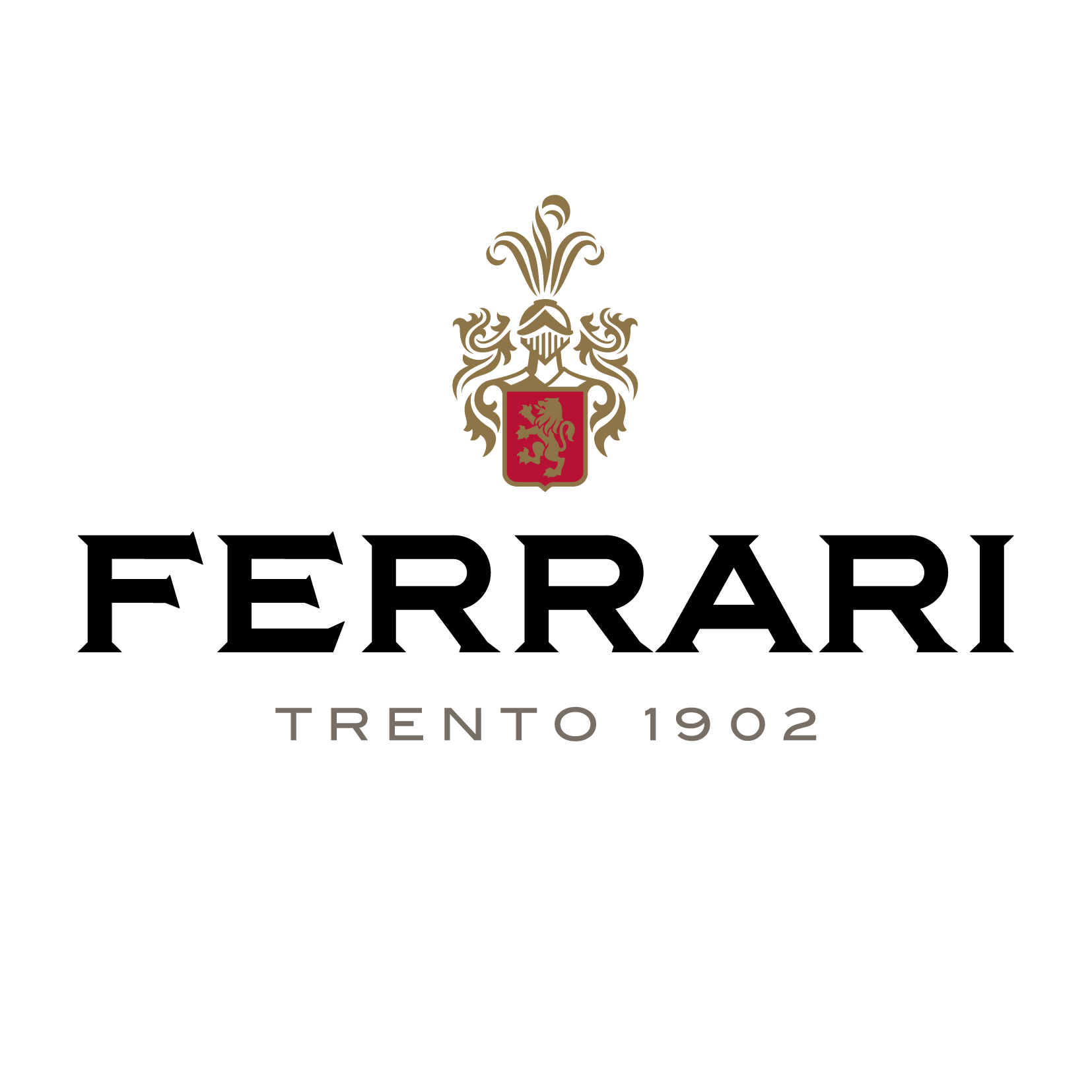
- Company type: Public limited company
- Industry: Wine & Spirits
- Founded: 1902
- Founder: Giulio Ferrari
- Headquarters: Trento, Italy
- Key people: Matteo Lunelli (President & CEO of Gruppo Lunelli)
- Products: Traditional Method Sparkling Wine
- Revenue: €114 Million
- Owner: Lunelli Group
- Website: https://www.ferraritrento.com/

Ferrari F.lli Lunelli S.p.A., or Ferrari Trento or Cantine Ferrari, is an Italian company specialized in the production of the traditional method sparkling wine, also called Metodo Classico or Méthode Classique.

== History ==
Giulio Ferrari was born on 9 April 1879 in Calceranica al Lago, at the time part of the Austrian County of Tyrol. In 1902, he decided to make sparkling wine in Austria and in Italy with the metodo Ferrari, essentially the same as the traditional methode Champenoise (method of Champagne), with the wine being aged for four to five years.

In 1952, Ferrari was aged, tired, and childless, so he chose Bruno Lunelli (1907–1973), who owned a wine shop in Trento and had five children, to take over the winery. At the time, Ferrari was making 9,000 bottles per year.

Giulio Ferrari died in Trento on 14 January 1965.

In 1969, Bruno Lunelli, aged 63, decided to step down and leave responsibilities to the second generation: Franco (1935), Giorgio (1937), Gino (1939), Carla (1945), and Mauro (1948). The third and current generation comprises Matteo Lunelli (President and CEO), Camilla Lunelli, Alessandro Lunelli, and Marcello Lunelli.

Starting with the 2021 Emilia Romagna Grand Prix, Ferrari Trento became the official toast of Formula One, taking over from Carbon champagne. The sponsorship contract was renewed in 2022 for three years. In 2022, Ferrari Trento's vineyard made a breakthrough entrance in William Reed's World’s Best Vineyards ranking, climbing 50 positions in a single edition.

== Description ==
Ferrari Trento is the biggest company of Lunelli Group, a corporation of six different brands operating in the wine (Tenute Lunelli and Bisol), bottled water (Surgiva), grappa and spirit sector (Segnana). The Lunelli Group also has a two-Star Michelin restaurant, Locanda Margon.

Ferrari Trento is a member of the Trentodoc consortium, an association that disciplines the production of this type of sparkling wine. DOC is similar to the French Appellation Contrôlée.

Within the Ferrari's cellars it is possible to find over 24 million sparkling wine bottles which are fermenting from at least 2 years up to 15.
