= Nosiola =

Variety of grape

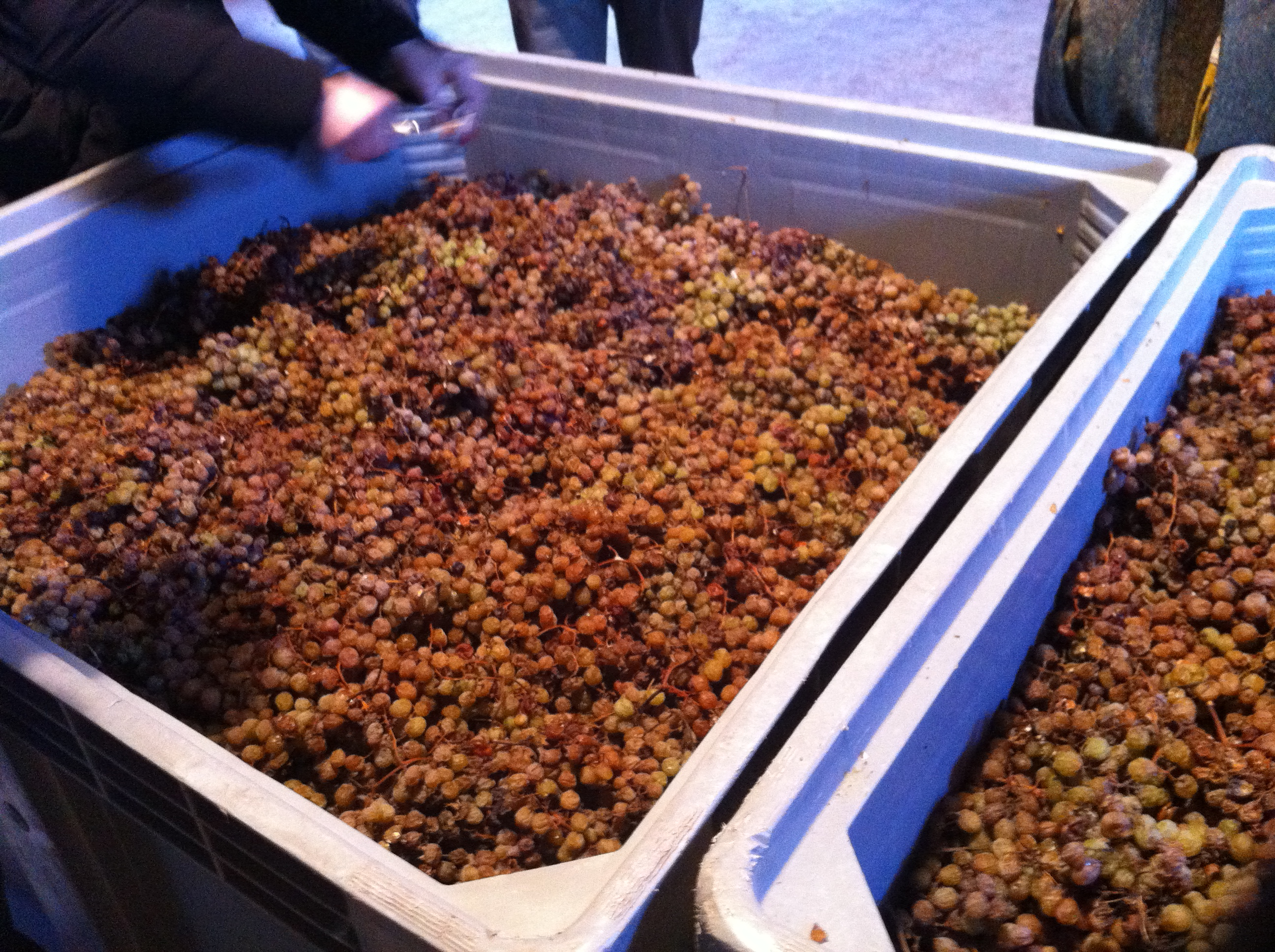
Late harvested Nosiola grapes with some noble rot infection that are destined for further drying and Vin Santo production.

Nosiola (or Groppello bianco) is a white Italian wine grape variety that is grown in the Trentino region north of Lake Garda in the Valle dei Laghi. Here it is used in varietal Denominazione di origine controllata (DOC) wines and as a blending component in wines such as Sorni Bianco from Trento. It is also used to produce a dessert wine in the Vin Santo style from grapes that have been allowed to dry out prior to fermentation.

== History ==
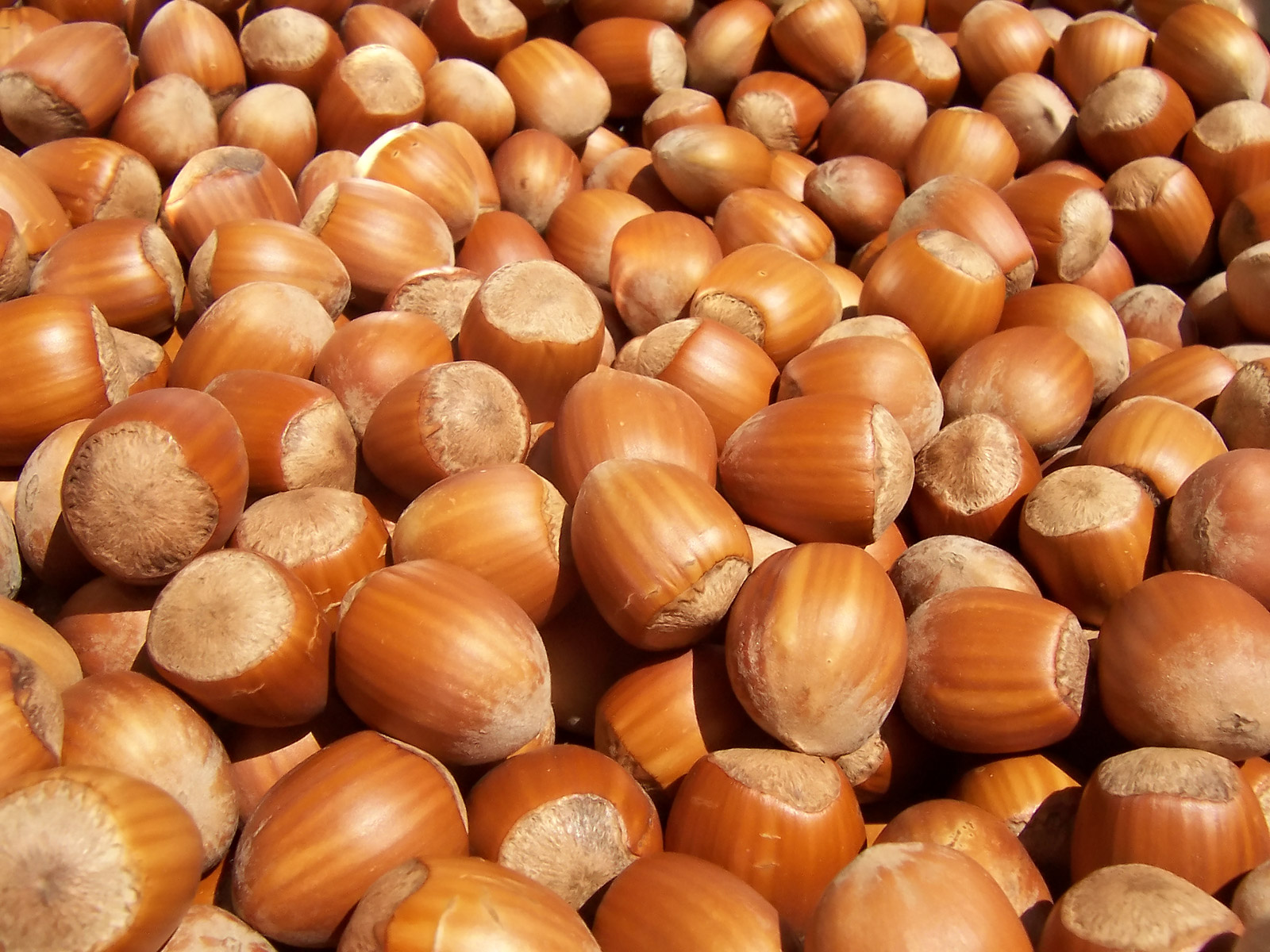
The name Nosiola could be derived from the Italian word for hazelnut (nocciola) which may be a reference to either the hazelnut aroma note that sometimes comes out in Nosiola-based wines or to the light, instead of dark, brown color that raisined Nosiola grapes turn when they are very mature.

Ampelographers believe that the name Nosiola is derived from the Italian word nocciola (hazelnut) which could be a reference to the characteristic toasted hazelnut aromas that varietal examples of Nosiola exhibit. It could also be a reference to the grape berries themselves since, unlike most white grape varieties, they don't turn a dark, raisin brown when very mature. Another theory is that the name is a corruption of ociolet which in the local dialect of the Trentino regions means "little eyes" and was associated with the (likely now extinct) 18th-century wine grape Uva dall'Occhio bianca whose name meant "white eye's grape" and may have been related to Nosiola.

Another grape that may be related to Nosiola is the ancient Roman wine grape Raetica that was reportedly the most widely planted white wine grape in northern Italy during Roman times. Ampelographers have long thought that Groppello di Revò (which is grown in the Val di Non region of Trentino) and Nosiola (which is also known as Groppello bianco) were descendants of Raetica but so far there has not been any conclusively historical evidence or DNA analysis to confirm that theory.

One grape that DNA analysis has linked to Nosiola is the Swiss wine grape Rèze which is grown in the Valais region. DNA has shown that both Nosiola and Groppello di Revò share a parent-offspring relationship with Rèze and, given that Rèze has been well known and documented nearly five centuries before the other two, it is more likely that Rèze is the parent variety with the other two being offspring.

Where Nosiola originated is not yet fully known though the grape's long association with the Trentino region makes that area the most likely source. Another possibility is the Alto Adige region where Nosiola has long been known under the synonym Spargelen.

== Viticulture and confusion with other grapes ==
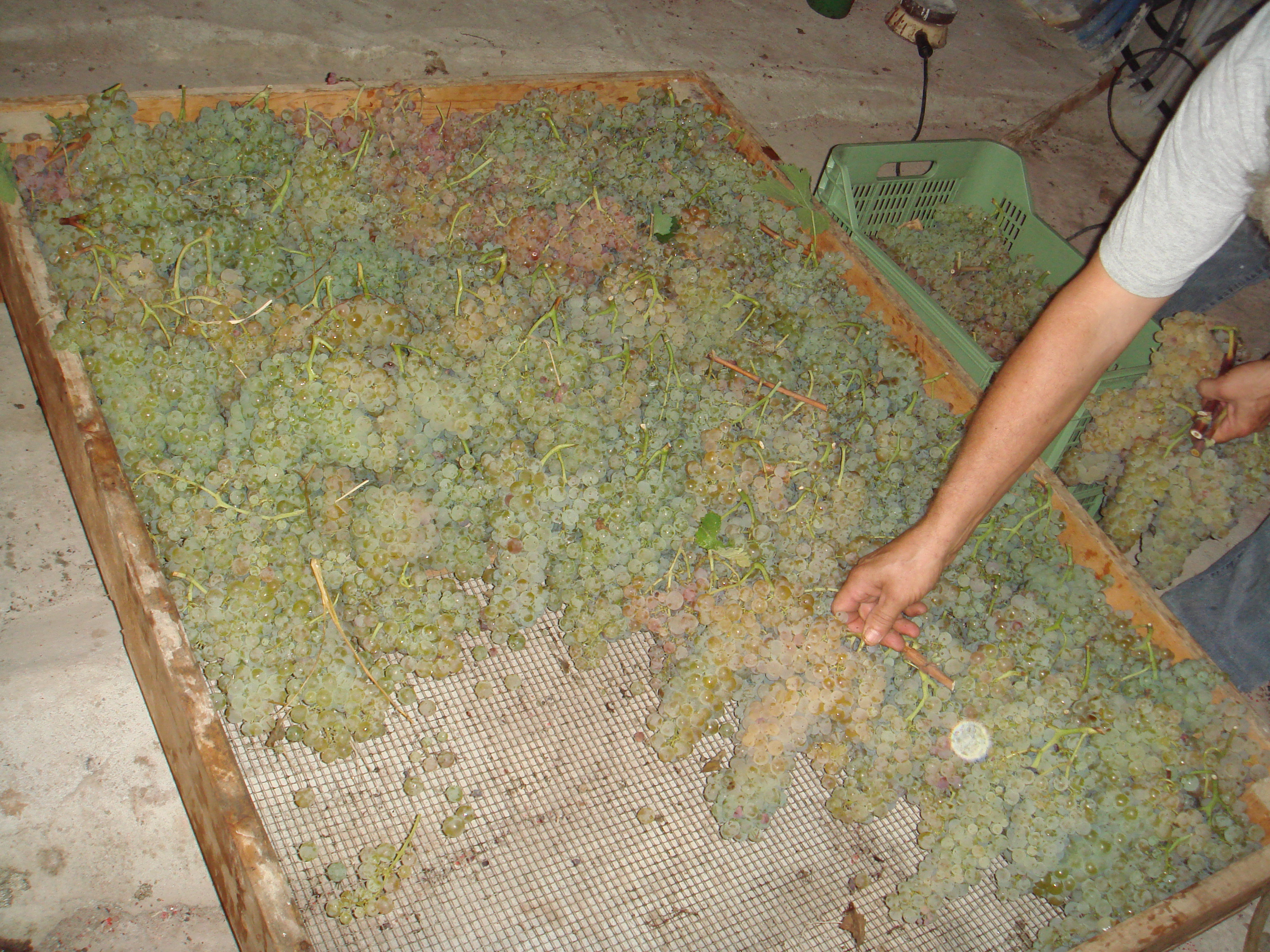
After harvest Nosiola berries are usually laid out on straw mats (like these Trebbiano grapes in Tuscany) for further desiccation (drying) to make Vin Santo.

Nosiola is a mid to late ripening grape variety that also tends to buds early in the growing season which can make it susceptible to the viticultural hazard of springtime frost. The variety is also very sensitive to climate with too humid of a vintage making the vine prone to fungal infections such as sour rot and powdery mildew. While the thick skins, late ripening and easy desiccation nature of Nosiola berries makes them suitable for passito style winemaking, the stems attached to the berries can also suffer from desiccation earlier in the growing season before the grapes have fully ripening and reached appropriate sugar levels.

Due to similarities in synonyms and appearance, Nosiola is sometimes confused with the Veneto wine grape Durella.

== Wine regions ==
In 2000, there were 193 hectares (480 acres) of Nosiola planted in Italy, almost exclusively in the Trentino region particularly around the Valle dei Laghi region between the city of Trento and Lake Garda. Other plantings of the grape can be found around the commune of Merano in South Tyrol, the Lagarina Valley and Val di Cembra.

Around the communes of Calavino, Cavedine, Lasino, Padergnone and Vezzano nearly 10 hectares (25 acres) of Nosiola are dedicated to being the sole variety behind the rare Vino Santo dessert wine made under the Trentino DOC. Allowed to dry out on racks after harvest, the Nosiola berries lose 60–80% of their original weight, leaving a very low yield of juice after pressing. The slow fermentation and 7–10 years of barrel and bottle aging usually contributes to an average annual production of around 30,000 half (375 ml) bottles of the dessert wine.

=== DOC wines ===
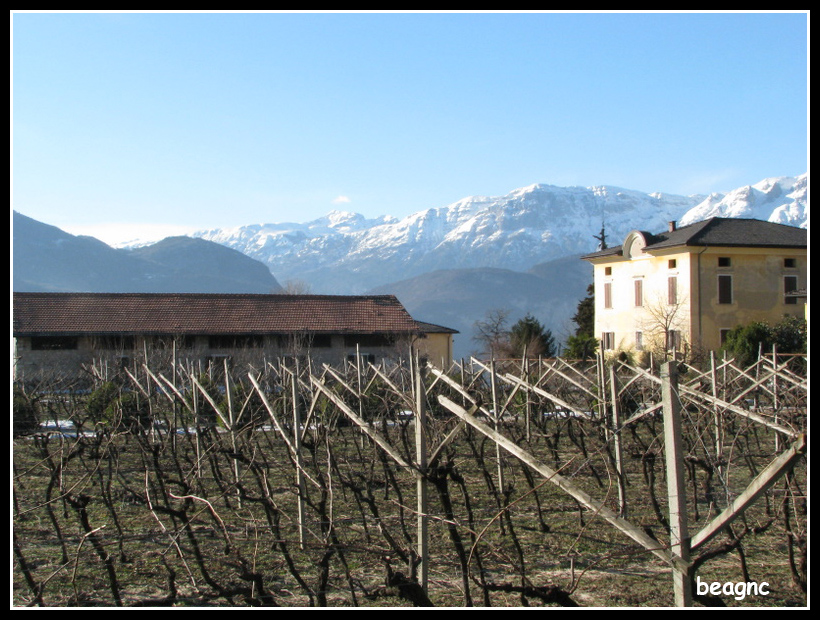
Nosiola is grown throughout the Trento region of northwest Italy.

Nosiola is the primary component in the white wines from the Sorni DOC where it constitutes 70% of the blend with Müller-Thurgau, Sylvaner verde and Pinot blanc permitted to fill in the remaining 30%. Nosiola destined for DOC production must be harvested to a yield no greater than 14 tonnes/hectare with the finished wines needing to attain a minimum alcohol level of at least 10%.

In Trentino DOC, a varietal wine is produced that is 100% Nosiola with the grapes harvested to a yield no greater than 14 tonnes/ha and a minimum alcohol level of 10.5% Nosiola is also the only permitted variety in the sweet Vino Santo style wine produced in the DOC from grapes harvested to the same yield restriction as the varietal wine but with a minimum alcohol level of 16% and an additional requirement that the wine receives at least three years of aging in oak and the bottle prior to release.

Nosiola is a minor blending component in the white wines of the Valdadige DOC that spans across the provinces of Bolzano and Trento and into the Veneto wine region province of Verona. Here Nosiola plays a supporting role along with Bianchetta Trevigiana, Trebbiano Toscano, Vernaccia, Sylvaner and Veltliner bianco to the Pinot blanc, Pinot gris, Riesling Italico, Muller-Thurgau and Chardonnay that makes up the bulk of the wine. Nosiola destined for DOC wine production are limited to a harvest yield of no greater than 14 tonnes/ha and a minimum alcohol level of 10.5% for the wines.

== Wine styles ==
According to Master of Wine Jancis Robinson, Nosiola produces very aromatic light-bodied wines that can have a slight bitter note. As a dry varietal wine, these notes can include citrus, apricot and peach fruit flavors as well as characteristic subtle hazelnut note. When made as a Vin Santo, often aided by the effect of noble rot on the late harvested grapes, the wines are more fuller-bodied and luscious with notes of orange peel, apricot, lime, pineapple and quince.

Wine writers Joe Bastianich and David Lynch describe Nosiola wine as having apple and lemon notes with some minerality.

== Synonyms ==
Over the years Nosiola has been known under a variety of synonyms including Groppello bianco, Durella, Nosella, Nosellara, Nosilla, Nosiola Gentile, Nosiola Trentina, Nosiola Spinarola, Nusiola, Nusiola Gentile, Rabiosa, Spargelen (in the Alto Adige region), Spargeren and Spatfelen.
