= Blatterle =

Variety of grape

Blatterle is a white Italian wine grape variety from the Alto-Adige of northeast Italy. The grape, which was historically grown around the commune of Bolzano in South Tyrol and the Eisacktal valley, gets its name from the term in the local Tyrolese dialect for "little leaves". While not widely used in commercial wine production, the grape is sometimes blended with other local Tyrolese varieties, such as Fraueler, and Müller-Thurgau.

== History ==
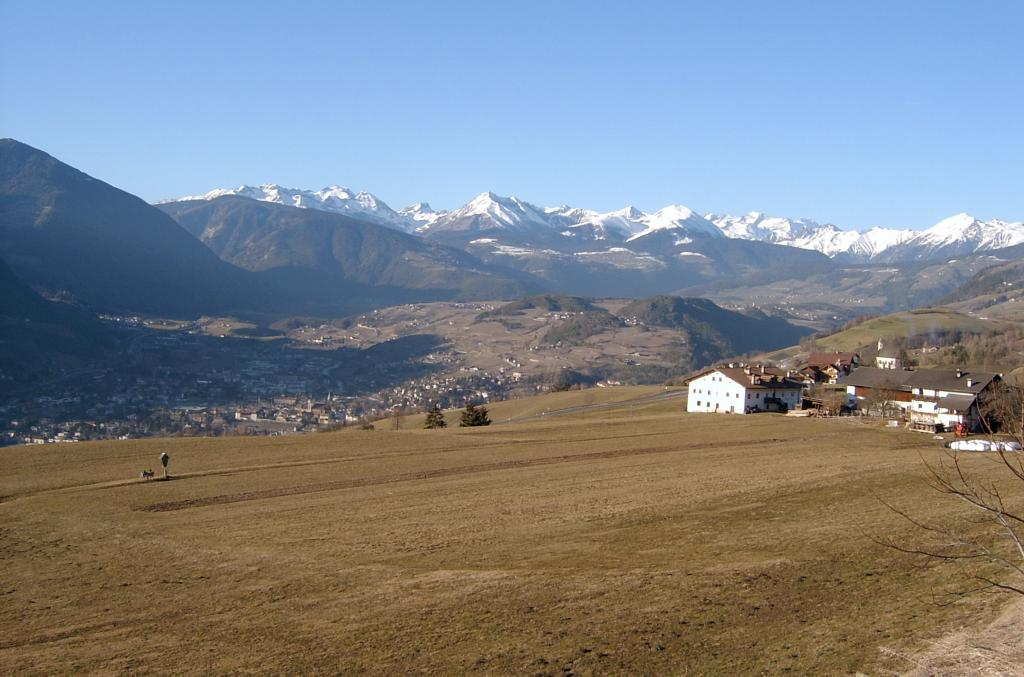
The Eisacktal Valley, where Blatterle has been historically grown.

Blatterle has a long history of being grown in northeast Italy, particularly along the Eisack river and around the commune of Bolzano. Historically, the grape was also known under the synonym Platterle with its name being derived from the local Tyrolese word for "little leaves". Over the last few centuries, plantings of Blatterle have sharply declined and by the turn of the 21st century the variety was on the verge of extinction with only a few producers still cultivating the variety.

== Viticulture ==
Blatterle is an early ripening grape variety that is well adapted to the continental climate and short growing season of Alto-Adige region. The grape name, meaning "little leaves", refers to the morphological trait of small grapevine leaves that can be observed in the canopy.

== Wine regions ==
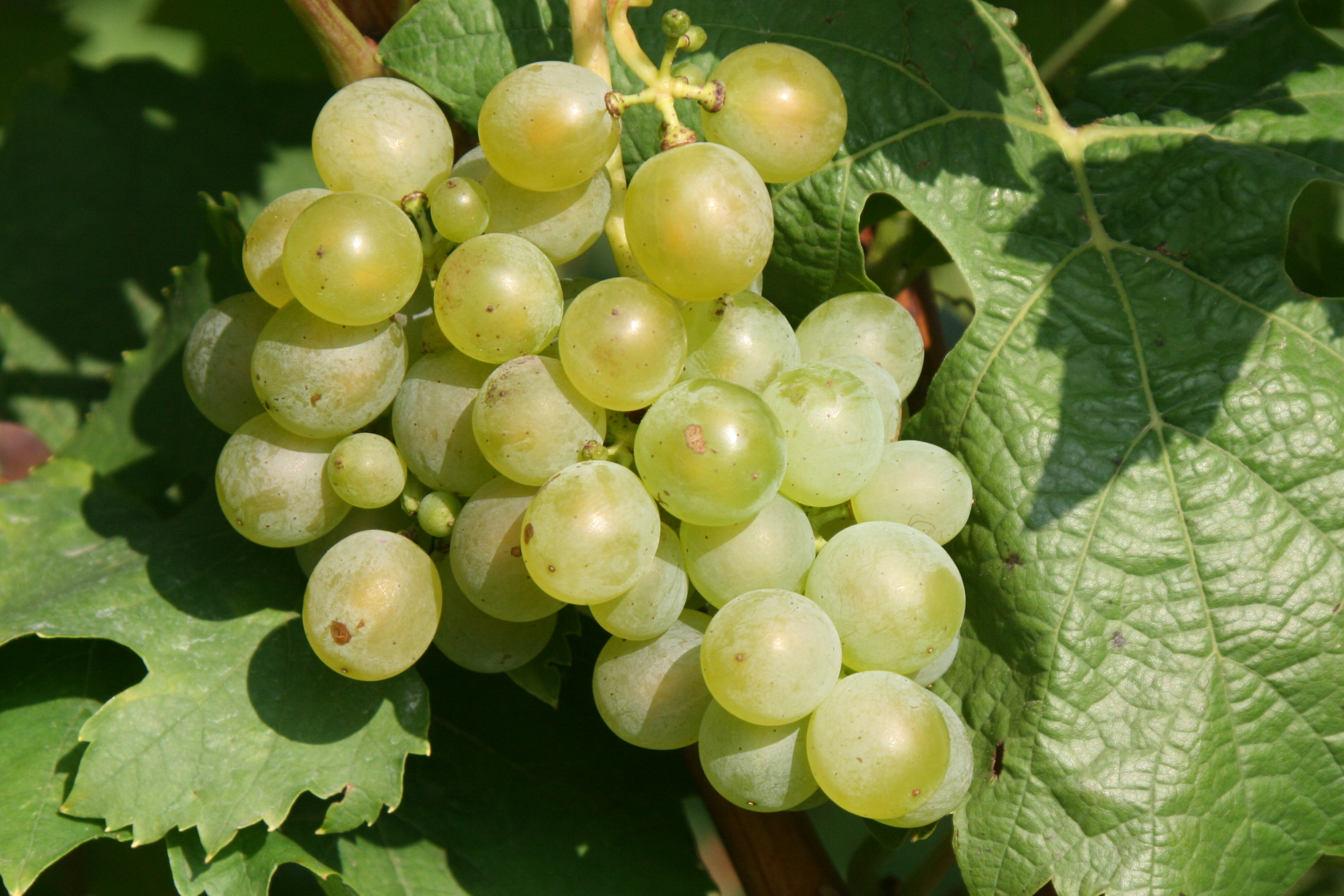
Müller-Thurgau (pictured), one of the grape varieties that is commonly blended with Blatterle.

Today, Blatterle is almost exclusively cultivated in the Alto-Adige region where it used to make both a varietal vino da tavola wine and as a blending component with other local varieties, such as Fraueler, and Müller-Thurgau.

== Synonyms ==
Over the years, Blatterle has been known under a variety of synonyms including: Bianchetto de Verzuolo, Blaterle, Blatterl and Platterle.
