= Trento DOC =

Italian controlled origin wine

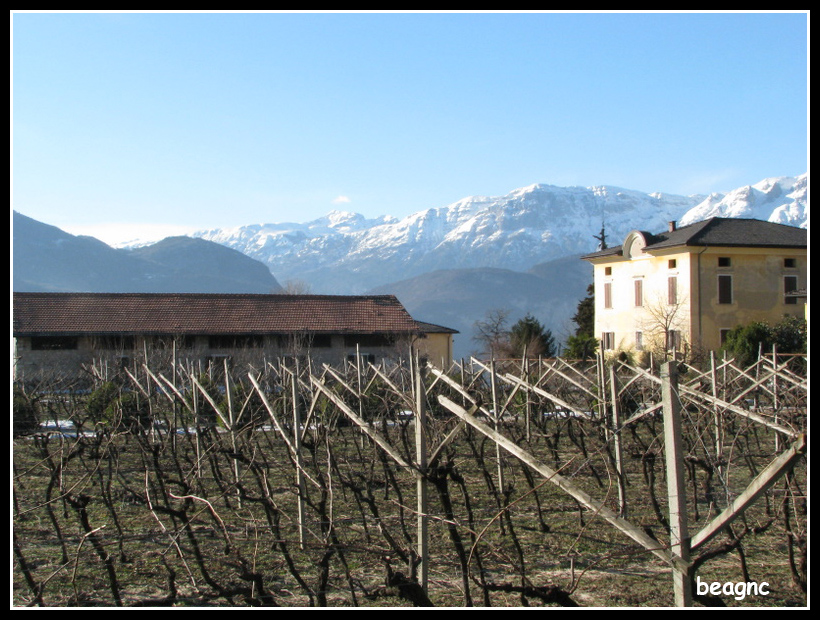
Vineyard in Trento

Trento DOC (Denominazione di origine controllata) is an appellation for white and rosé sparkling wine made in Trentino, Italy. Trentinos developed this appellation, the second in the world after Champagne, to ensure quality and distinction. Only Chardonnay, Pinot noir, and Pinot Meunier with Pinot blanc are permitted, and they must be grown in a well-defined area within the Province of Trento.

== History ==
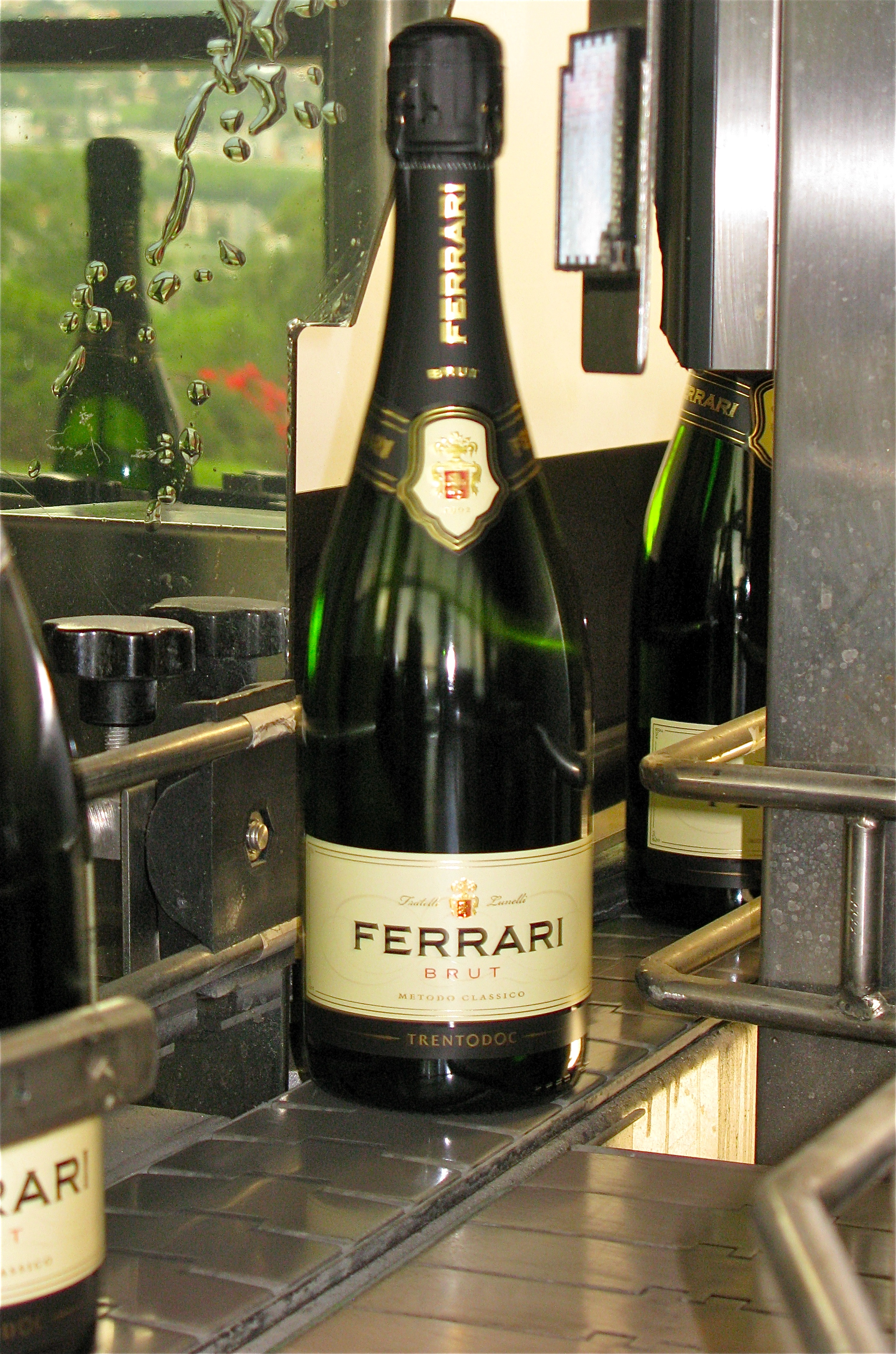
Example of a Trento DOC Label

Chardonnay grapes were first brought to the region from France around 1900 by Giulio Ferrari when Trento was still part of the Austro-Hungarian Empire. After graduating from the Forschungsanstalt für Garten- und Weinbau in Geisenheim/Rheingau, Germany, Ferrari gained winemaking experience in the Champagne-producing town of Épernay. His eponymous company is now run by the third generation Ferrari's successor, Bruno Lunelli.

== Vineyards ==
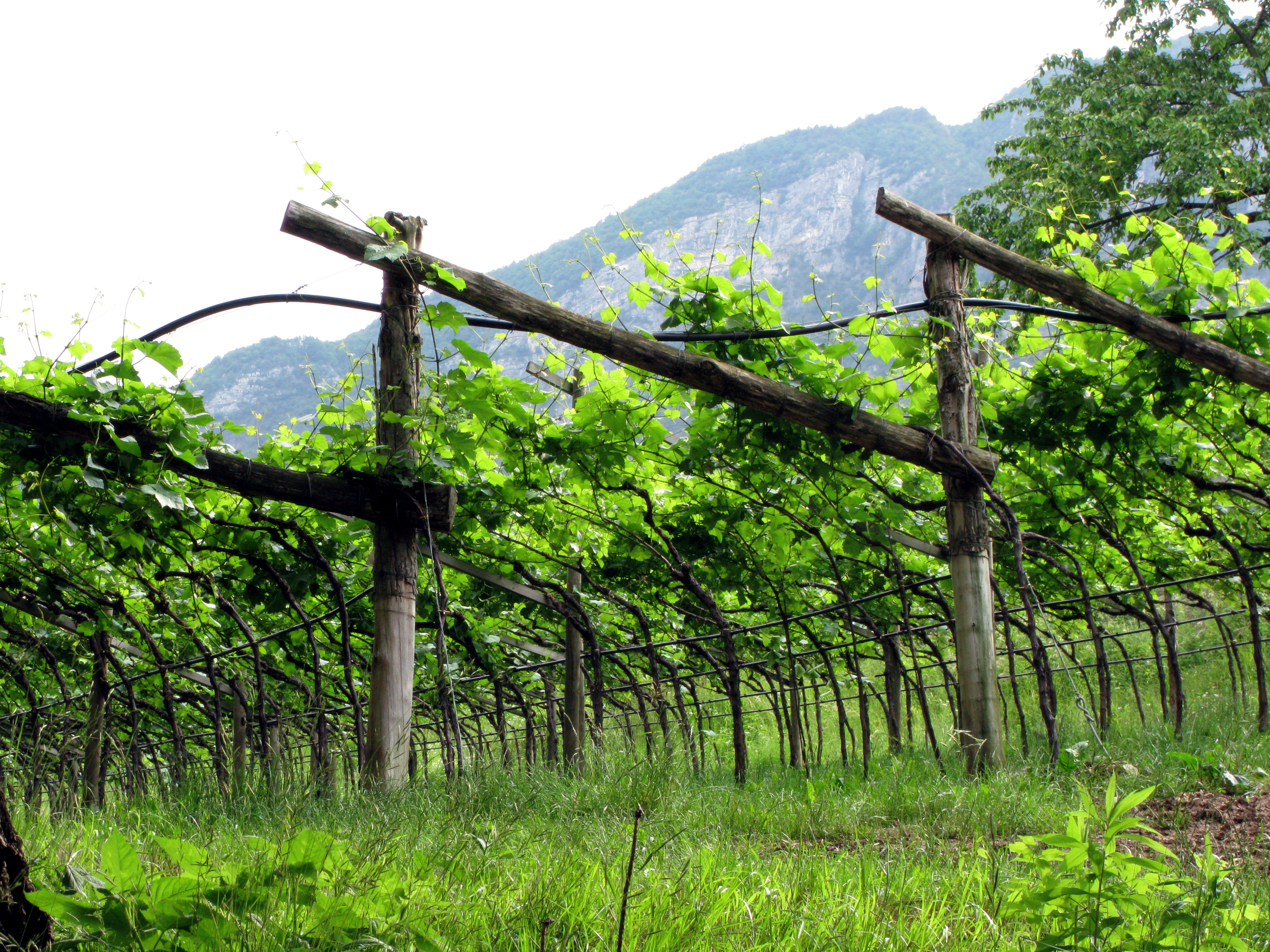
Grapes Grown in the 'Pergola Trentino' Style

Besides Ferrari, there are currently fifty-eight wineries producing Trento DOC, including Cavit, the largest cooperative in the province with some 65% of production and whose Pinot grigio is widely exported but produced under a different DOC designation in the Trentino-Alto Adige/Südtirol wine region; Rotari, who specialize in sparkling wine and also use the Talento identification; and Cesarini Sforza, founded in 1974 by a group of wine entrepreneurs who focus on spumante.

== Winemaking ==
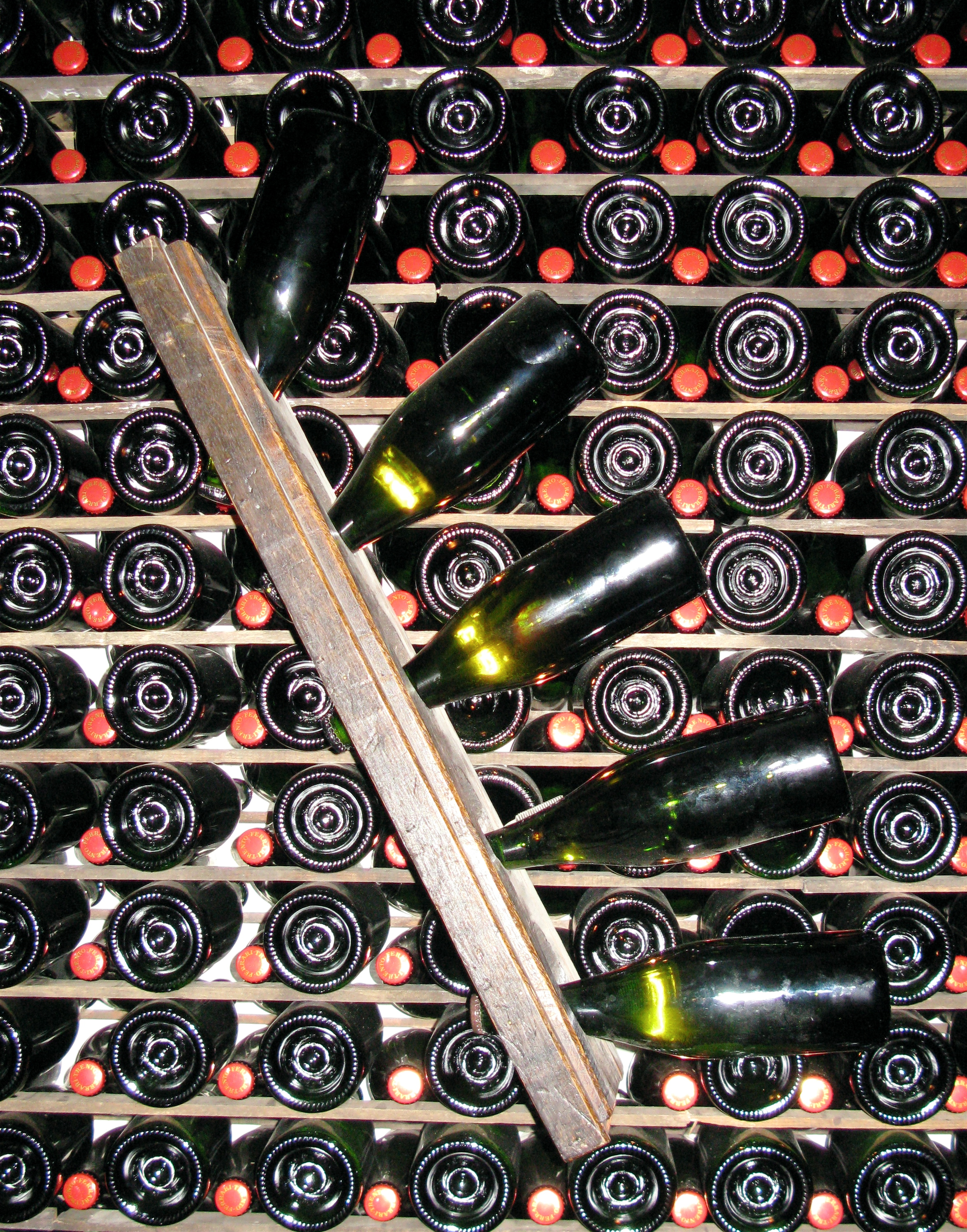
Rémuage or Riddling: Gradual turning and inverting, which brings lees to bottle neck for removal.

As with Méthode Traditionnelle, the second fermentation for sparkling Trento must occur in the bottle, which is riddled and then disgorged by freezing a small amount of wine in the neck of the bottle and removing the plug of ice containing the lees.

Trento DOC has more rigorous requirements than Methodo Claissico or Méthode Traditionnelle: The wine has to be made using techniques characteristic of the region, including how the vines are planted, cultivated, pruned, and hand-harvested (e.g., see photo of 'Pergola Trentino'). Forcing is not permitted, irrigation is allowed only as an emergency measure, maximum vine yield is 150 q.l. per hectare for all varietals, and maximum grape yield is 70%. The wines must rest for a minimum of 15 months on their lees for non-vintage, 24 months for vintage, and 36 for riserva. Minimum alcohol content must be 11.5%, or 12% for riserva. Thus ensuring Trento DOC on the label means the wine is of the highest quality and made using these very strict standards.

Trento DOC wines are distinguished by a delicate, rich bouquet, a dry, smooth, rounded and elegant flavor, and a straw-yellow color.

While there are no DOC restrictions on the exact proportions of the blend, the grape varieties used in Trento DOC are limited to Chardonnay, Pinot noir, Pinot Meunier and Pinot blanc. After secondary fermentation, the wines must rest on their lees for a minimum of 15 months for non-vintage wines, 24 months for vintage wines and 36 months for wines labeled as Riserva. The alcohol level for the finished wines must be a minimum of 11.5% for non-vintage and vintage wines and 12% for Riserva wines.

== See also ==
- List of Italian DOCG wines
