= South Tyrol wine =

Wine produced in South Tyrol, Italy

Trentino-Alto Adige
- Wine region
- Type: Italian wine
- Year established: 1971
- Years of wine industry: 1971–present
- Country: Italy
- Soil conditions: Volcanic, alluvial, clay, limestone
- Grapes produced: 60% white varieties, 40% red varieties
- Varietals produced: Red: Lagrein, Schiava, Merlot, Cabernet Sauvignon, Pinot Noir; White: Gewürztraminer, Müller-Thurgau, Pinot Bianco, Sauvignon Blanc, Chardonnay
- Official designations: 1 DOCG: Trento DOC; 9 DOCs including Alto Adige DOC, Trentino DOC, Santa Maddalena; Several IGTs including Vigneti delle Dolomiti

Location of Trentino-Alto Adige wine region in Italy

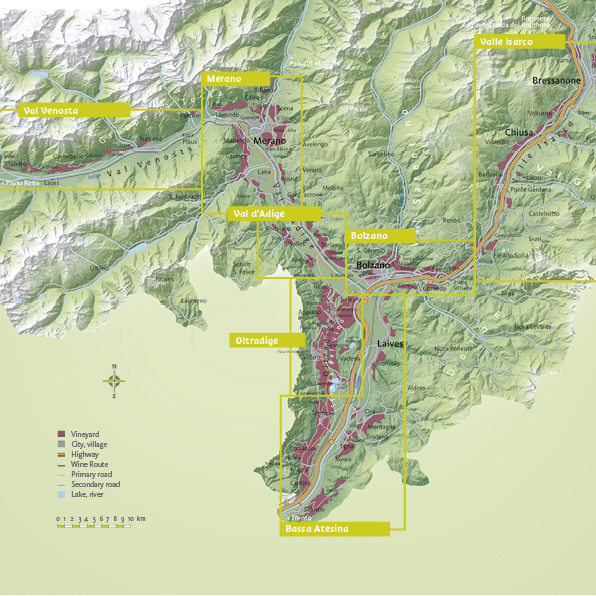
Map of the South Tyrolean wine zones

South Tyrol (called in Italian Alto Adige) is an autonomous province located in northeast Italy producing wine. This Austro-Italian wine region is noted for the distinct Austrian influences on the wine industry, due to the region's long history under the rule of Austria-Hungary and Holy Roman Empires.

Because of its unique history and location within the southern Alps and Dolomites, in this region grows a wide range of grape varieties that are not usually seen in other parts of Italy. These include Müller-Thurgau, Vernatsch, Lagrein, Sylvaner, Riesling (known in Italian as Riesling Renano), Gewürztraminer (known in Italian as Traminer Aromatico) and Blatterle.

== Winemaking ==
Winemaking in Tyrol has a long tradition: the first evidence dates back to the period before the Romans.

The South Tyrolean winegrowing area is highly influenced by the Mediterranean climate, which in the Adige Valley (Überetsch-Unterland, Überetsch, Bozen, Terlan, Burggrafenamt) arrives up to Meran. This allows a very versatile winemaking, which includes almost all the red grape varieties and a lot of white grape wines. The Vinschgau and the Eisacktal have a harsher climate and thus, are specialized in white wines.

In South Tyrol there are three indigenous varieties: Schiava, Gewürztraminer and Lagrein.

A similar winegrowing region is Trentino wine in the south.

== History ==
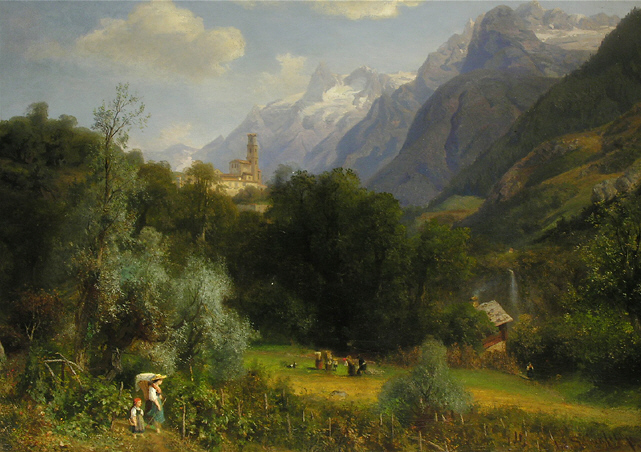
Wine harvest in south Tyrol, painting by Eduard Schönfeld (1839–1885)

Findings of seeds dating back to the Iron Age (Stufels near Brixen) and archaeological findings dating back to 400 BC witness that winegrowing was practised in South Tyrol already 3,000 years ago. Probably the earliest sources date back to before the Romans and to the wine produced by the Rhaetian.

Cato the Elder in his De agri cultura highlighted the Rhaetian wine, before the territory was conquered by the Romans. During the Roman Empire, wine production flourished in what is now southern Alto Adige and the Lagrein, Schiava and Teroldego grape varieties were created.

In 720 AD, under the commissioner Corbinio, first bishop of Freising, vineyards landed in Burggrafenamt. From the twelfth century the monasteries in southern Germania and the aristocrats incentive the winemaking.

In the late Middle Ages and during the Habsburg monarchy the production of wine in the south Tyrolean wineries flourished. The wine production and sale developed thanks to the activity of the families of winemakers from the nineteenth century and thanks to the cooperatives since the twentieth century. In the twentieth century there were several critical periods: first due to the phylloxera and then in the First Post-war with the breakdown of the traditional markets (Austria, Hungary, Bavaria) with the initial fascist repression (as well as during the Second Post-war). In the 1930s there was a huge development of the wine industry in Alto Adige, but it was blocked by WW2.

However with the mass production, the Italian wine industry consolidated from the 1950s until the 1980s. In the 1980s there was a deep crisis of the sales channels most common at the times, especially the sale of wine in tanks in Switzerland. Cellars changed their sales strategy. More quality wines were produced; quantity moved to the background and nowadays it hasn't value any longer. Decisive for the winemaking in South Tyrol was 1971, when people returned to the division and classification of wine zones according to the PDO rules. The quality production, pursued up until now since 20 years, as well as the spread of the bottling in bottles of 0,75 litres have earned this small wine area an excellent reputation. This is especially true for white wines in Italy, but also for the wine experts in the international markets.

The South Tyrolean Wine Museum in Kaltern offers an overview of the history and the traditional grape cultivation methods in South Tyrol. Since 1964 has been created the Wine way, a famous tourism attraction that stretches from Merano to Salorno in southern Alto Adige.

== Cultivation zones ==
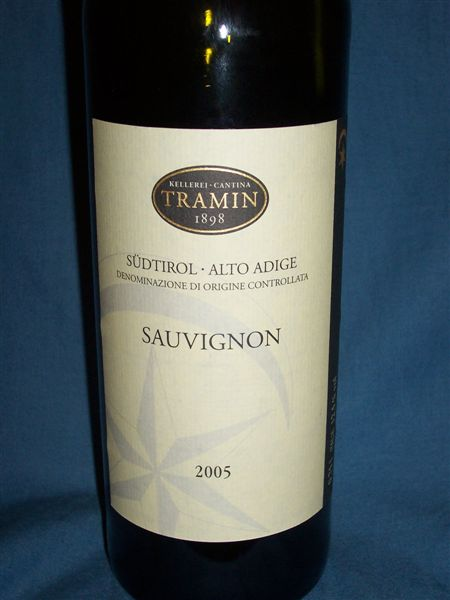
Kellerei Tramin 1898 wine from South Tyrol/Alto Adige

South Tyrol (Alto Adige in Italian) is a small but faceted winegrowing region. Unique in its field in Italy, it is a region where 20 different grape varieties are cultivated on a land of 13,000 acres (5,300 hectares), which yields 3.9 million cases (50,000 hectoliters) of wine. With its geographical position, between an Alpine climatic zone and a Mediterranean one and with vineyards growing at only 1,200 metres (3,900 feet) above sea level, South Tyrol is Italy's smallest wine growing area. It has a high density of PDO wines (Protected Designation of Origin).

The South Tyrolean wine growing zone is divided into 7 PDO sub-regions:

- "Alto Adige Merano", around Merano;
- "Alto Adige Val Venosta", whose vineyards are located west of Merano and south of Adige;
- "Alto Adige Oltradige", located west of the Eisack river into the Adige, and north of Lake Kaltern near Terlan;
- "Alto Adige Valle Isarco", between Vahrn and Völs am Schlern;
- "Alto Adige Colli di Bolzano", southwest of Bolzano;
- "Alto Adige Santa Maddalena", northwest of the previous one.

Among these zones and beyond, there are regions, which produce wines called simply "Alto Adige/Südtirol DOC". The protected designations of origin rule the labeling of the south Tyrolean wines, according to the origin and guarantee to consumers, resellers and sommelier the source of wine.

Approximately 5,000 wine producers deliver their grapes to the 160 wineries, which produce a great variety of wine, red and sparkling wines, despite their small dimensions. Almost 70% of the south Tyrolean wine is produced in wineries run by social cooperatives, the remaining 25% comes from the association Alto Adige Estate Wineries, and the remaining 5% is produced by Alto Adige Independent Winegrowers.

== Winemaking ==
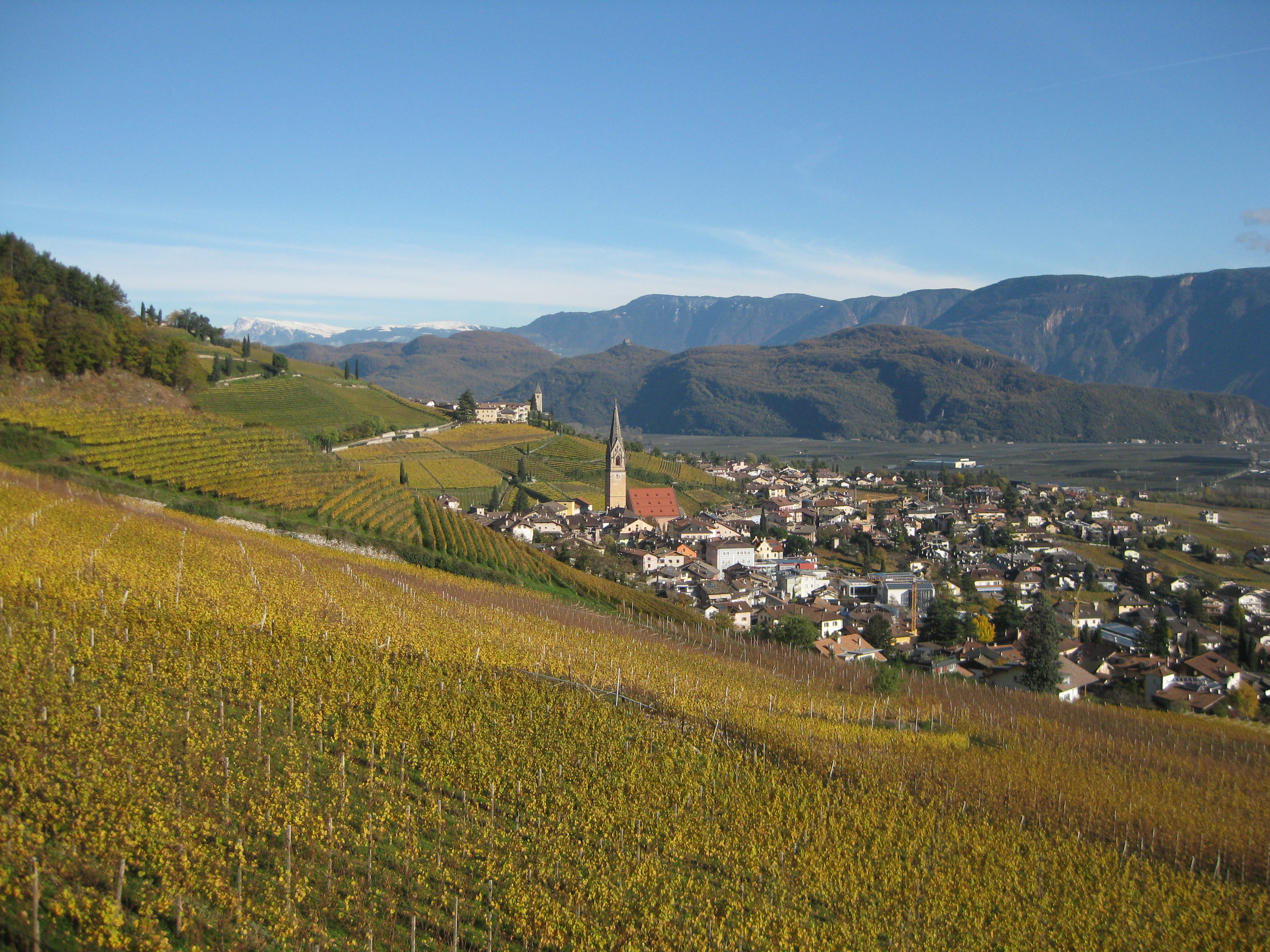
Vineyard in Tramin

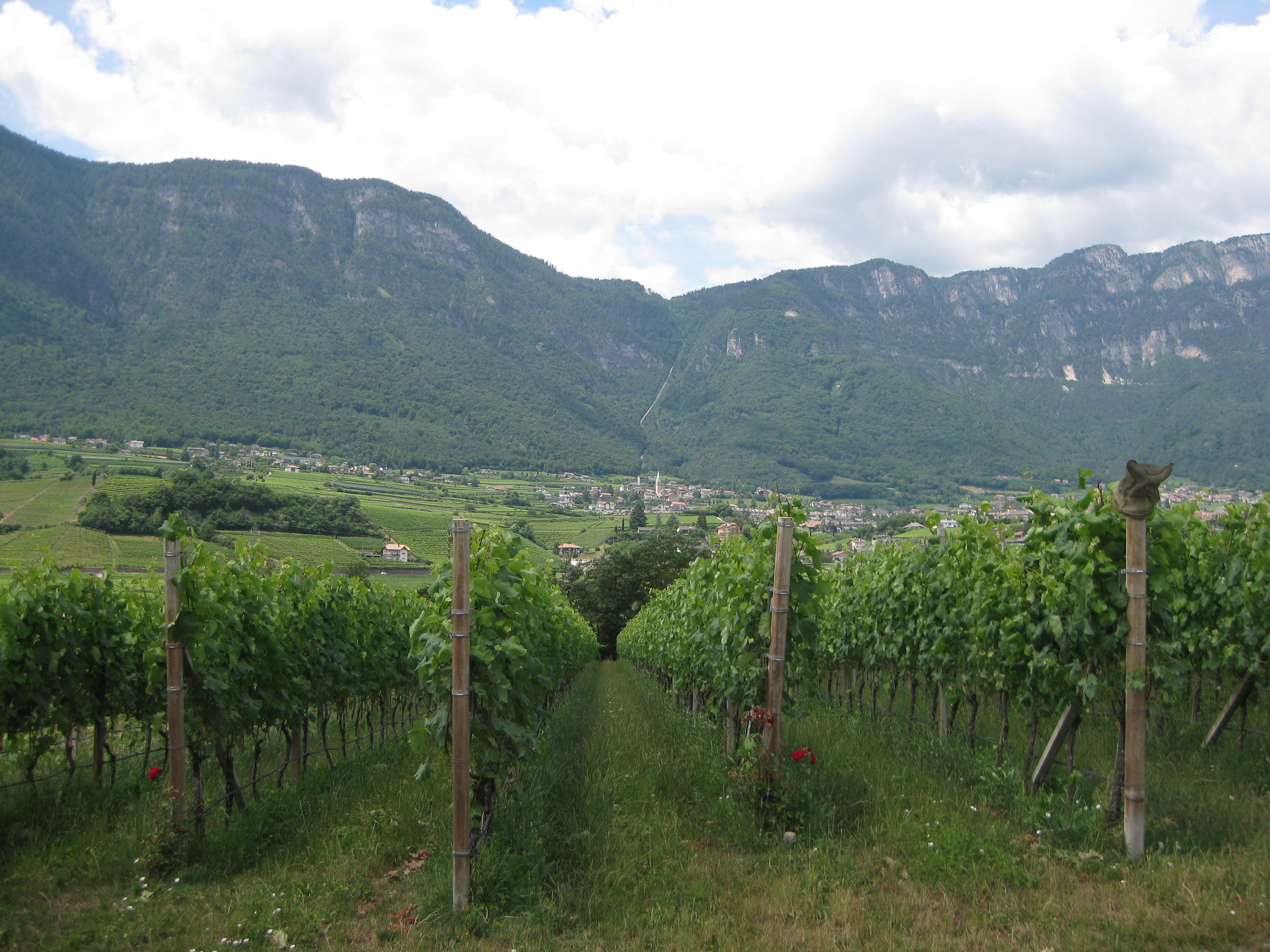
Vineyards at Kaltern in Überetsch

Winemaking in South Tyrol is particularly intensive: often involving handwork, on steep terraced slopes, with environment-friendly techniques. Thanks to the so-called "integrated winegrowing", South Tyrolean farmers strengthen the natural defences of the vineyards, protecting beneficial insects and supporting their spread. Strict limitations of yields and the consistent conversion of the classical pergola to the modern wire frame (Guyot) improved the quality of the grapes.

== Varieties ==
58% of the Alto Adige's wines are made with white grape varieties: Pinot Grigio, Gewürztraminer, Pinot bianco and Chardonnay are the most common. Also Sauvignon, Müller Thurgau, Sylvaner, Kerner, Riesling and Veltliner are produced.

As regards the red grape varieties, in South Tyrol along with the two indigenous varieties of Schiava and Lagrein all other classic grape varieties have been produced for far more than one hundred years: Pinot nero, Merlot, Cabernet Sauvignon and Cabernet Franc. Nearly 42% of the grape-growing area is planted with red wine varieties.

Varieties produced:

- Pinot bianco (Weißburgunder)
- Sauvignon
- Gewürztraminer
- Chardonnay
- Pinot Grigio (Grauburgunder)
- Riesling
- Sylvaner
- Veltliner
- Kerner
- Müller Thurgau
- Moscato
- Vernatsch (Schiava)
- Pinot nero (Blauburgunder)
- Lagrein
- Merlot
- Cabernet
- Moscato rosa

== Bibliography ==
- Gosetti Fernanda, Righi Parenti Giovanni. Il vino a tavola e in cucina. Vini e ricette regionali di: Val d'Aosta, Piemonte, Liguria, Lombardia, Veneto, Trentino, Alto Adige, Friuli Venezia Giulia. Milano, AMZ, 1980.
- Matthias Ladurner-Parthanes: Vom Perglwerk zur Torggl. Athesia, Bozen, 1972.
- Stocker, Barbara: Der Wein und seine Geschichte. Thaur/Bozen: deleatur, Südtirol in Wort und Bild, 49. Jg., 3. Quartal/2005.
- Andergassen, Gotthard: Südtiroler Weinbau und Weinwirtschaft um Mittelalter. Thaur/Bozen: deleatur, Südtirol in Wort und Bild, 49. Jg., 3. Quartal/2005.
- Zwerger, Roland: Vom Weißen Lagrein über den „Weißterlinger“ zum Gewürztraminer. Kleine Südtiroler Sortengeschichte mit besonderer Berücksichtigung von Tramin. Bozen: Athesiadruck, Der Schlern 79/2005, Heft 8/9.
- Nössing, Josef: Bozens Weinhandel im Mittelalter und in der Neuzeit. Linz: Druckerei R. Trauner, Stadt und Wein, 1996.
- Freie Weinbauern Südtirol: . 15. Juni 2007.
- Jens Priewe unter Mitarbeit von Christoph Tscholl: Die Weine von Südtirol. Der Guide für Kenner und Geniesser. Collection Rolf Heyne, Ausgabe 2006. ISBN 3-89910-299-1.
- Kilchmann, Martin: Weine aus Südtirol. Müller Rüschlikon, 1995. ISBN 3275011685.
- Meininger Einkaufsführer: Weine und Winzer aus Südtirol. Meininger Verlag, 2005. ISBN 3-87524-161-4 (PDF).
- Busche Infoguide: Winzer & Weingüter. Deutschland, Elsass, Luxemburg, Österreich und Südtirol. 4. Auflage. Busche Verlag, 2006. ISBN 3-89764-223-9.
- Peter Moser: Falstaff Weinguide Österreich Südtirol. 2005/2006. Falstaff-Verlag. ISBN 3-9501628-6-0.
- Andreas Otto Weber: Studien zum Weinbau der altbayerischen Klöster im Mittelalter. Steiner, 1999. ISBN 3-515-07290-X.
