= Lagrein =

Variety of grape

- Grape (Vitis)
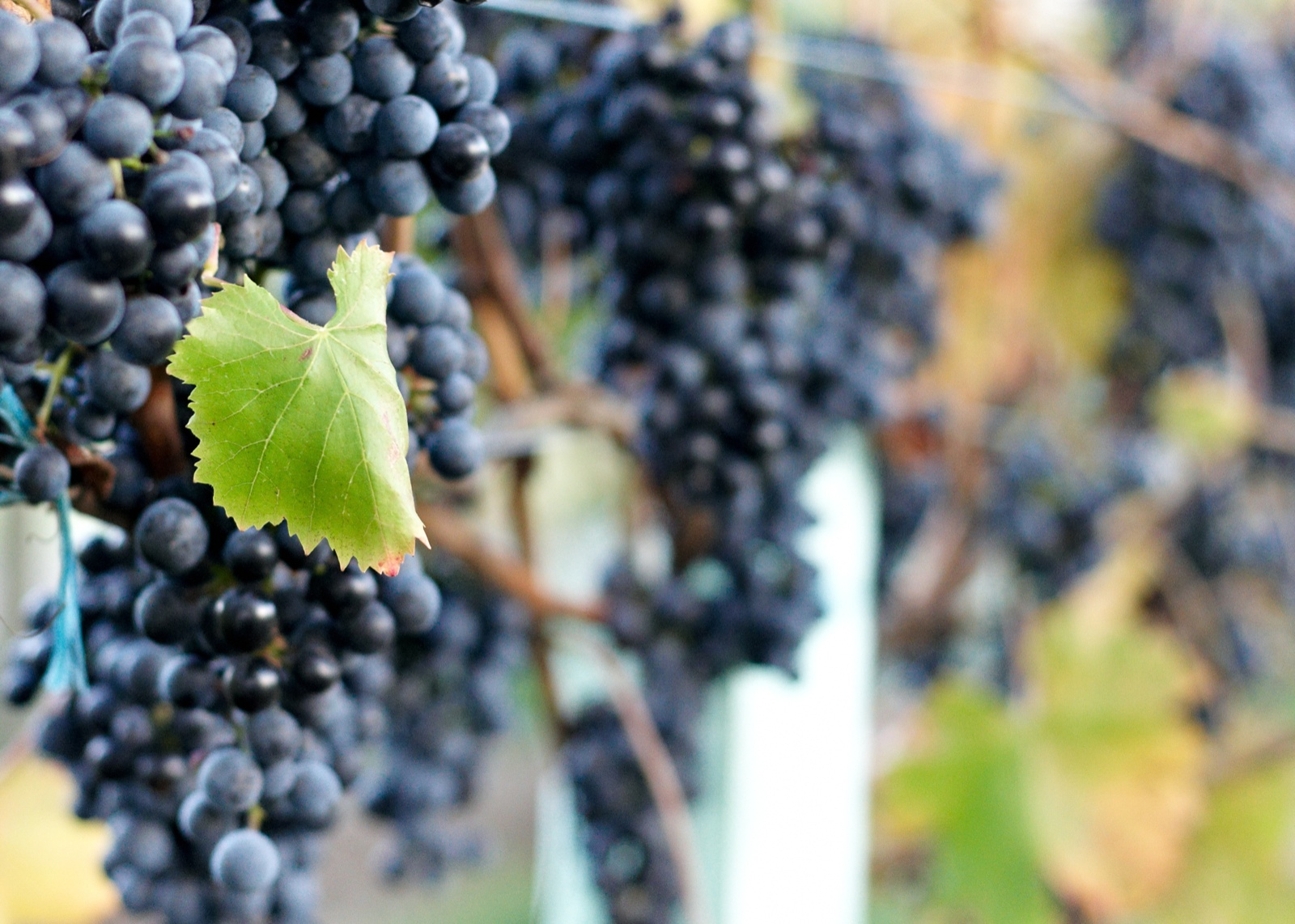
- Lagrein grapes in Gisborne South, Australia.
- Color of berry skin: Red
- Also called: Lagarino
- Notable regions: Trentino-Alto Adige/Südtirol
- Notable wines: Lagrein Scuro, Lagrein Dunkel, Lagrein Rosato, Lagrein Kretzer
- VIVC number: 6666

Lagrein (pronounced [laˈɡʁaɪn]) is a red wine grape variety native to the valleys of South Tyrol, northern Italy. Along with Marzemino, it is a descendant of Teroldego, and related to Syrah, Pinot noir and Dureza.

The name suggests its origins lie in the Lagarina valley of Trentino. It was mentioned as early as in the 17th century, in records of the Muri Abbey near Bolzano.

== Wine regions ==
Cultivation of Lagrein in South Tyrol usually results in the tannic red wines Lagrein Scuro, or Lagrein Dunkel, or the fragrant rosé wines Lagrein Rosato, or Lagrein Kretzer. In recent years, winemaking techniques have changed, with shortened maceration periods and used oak to achieve less aggressive flavours.

In Australia it is increasing in popularity, increasing from zero at the start of the century to about 40 producers currently, mostly in the cooler parts of the south-eastern states. Lagrein was pioneered in Australia by Peter May of Melbourne University’s Burnley Campus who discovered a couple of vines in the "vine library" of the Commonwealth Scientific and Industrial Research Organisation at Merbein in northeast Victoria, and in part influenced by research by Richard Smart and Peter Dry, planted the variety in his garden-sized vineyard at Kyneton in 1988.

There are small quantities of Lagrein grown in the Central Coast of California where it produces single varietal wine and is also blended with Syrah and Petite Sirah, and an additional production vineyard in the Umpqua Valley AVA which has 5 acres (2.0 ha) planted. Additional plantings include small acreage in the Willamette Valley, grown entirely by Montinore Estate. There are also small plantings in the Similkameen Valley in British Columbia, where it makes a single-varietal wine and is also blended with Toroldego.

== Styles ==
Lagrein produces wine with high acidity that are highly tannic. Eric Asimov notes that Lagrein produces

... congenial, straightforward wines that can be deliciously plummy, earthy and chewy, dark and full-bodied but not heavy, with a pronounced minerally edge.
