= Teroldego =

Variety of grape

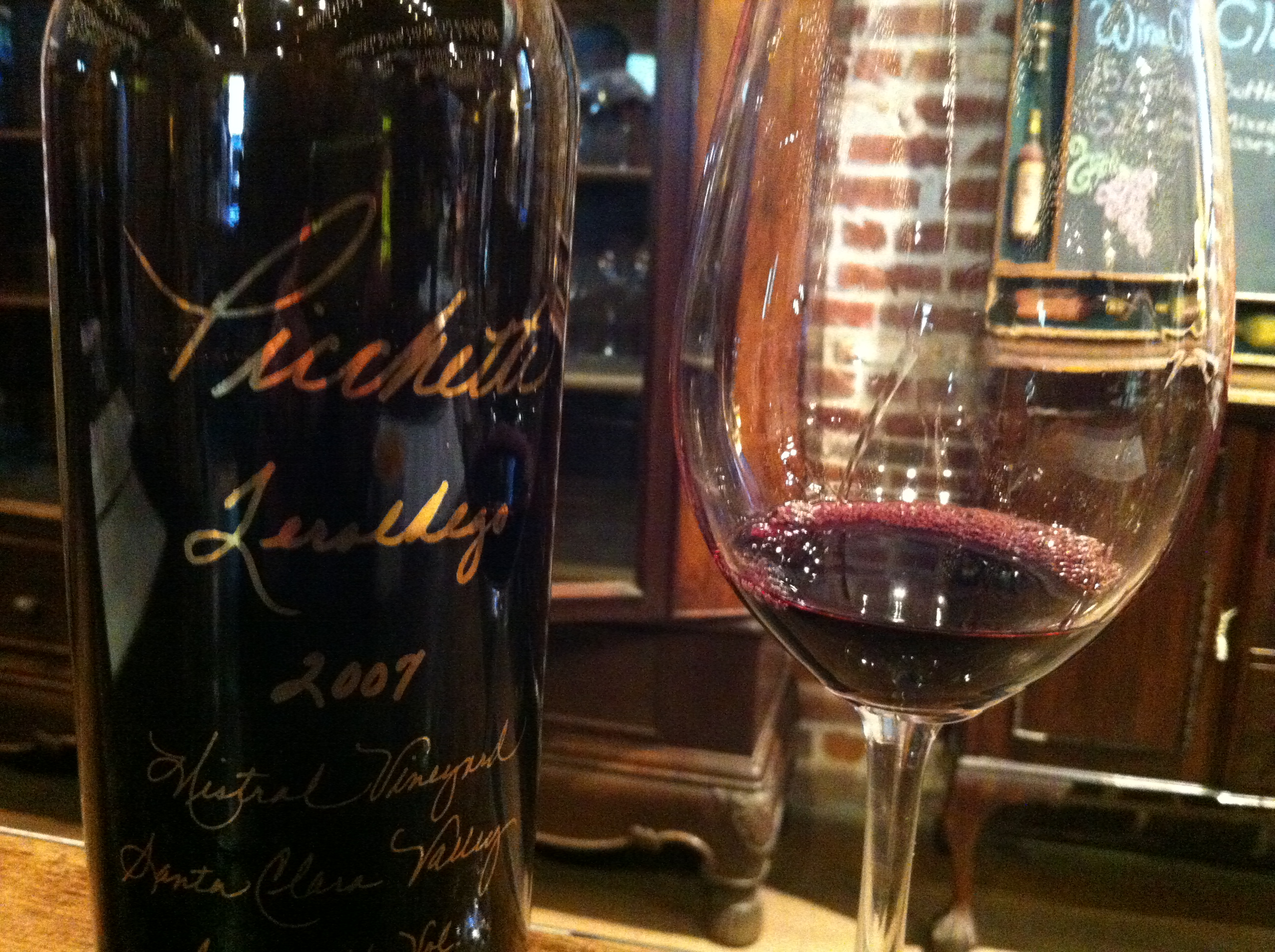
A Teroldego wine made in California.

Teroldego (Italian: [teˈrɔldeɡo], Venetian: [teˈɾɔldeɡo]) is a red Italian grape variety grown primarily in the northeastern region of Trentino-Alto Adige/Südtirol, Italy.

== Description ==
Wine has been produced since ancient times in Campo Rotaliano, an alluvial plain between the rivers Adige (Etsch) and Noce. Teroldego may take its name from its traditional method of cultivation, trained on a system of tirelle or wire harnesses, an explanation that's more likely, albeit less pretty, than its legendary association with German dialect for "gold of the Tyrol". Another theory, put forth in the book Wine Grapes credits a northern Italian village called Teroldege, or Teroldeghe, where documents dated in 15th century refer to the sale of Teroldego wine. It has recently been discovered to be a full sibling of the Dureza variety from France, which is one of the parents of Syrah.

The grapes ripen around the last week of September or the first week of October.

== Cultivation and winemaking ==
The wine Teroldego Rotaliano, which is made with this grape in Trentino, has had DOC status since 18 February 1971. It is planted on about 400 hectares and is cultivated by over 300 producers.

Roughly 96% is produced in Italy, with most of the rest of worldwide production in the US, Brazil, and Australia.

In Australia the variety is sparsely planted and has found homes in warmer and coastal climates such as McLaren Vale, Margaret River, Alpine Valley and Langhorne Creek.

US plantings are generally in small vineyards south and east of Sacramento, California.

Teroldego is similar in style to Lagrein, with dark colors and its hint of spice. There is something purplish and velvety about the wine. Unlike Lagrein, it is soft – it does not finish with bitterness, and its tannins are round .
