= Narrow-gauge railways in Italy =

Railways

A Naples Circumvesuviana train arrives at Pompei-Scavi in 2004

Most narrow-gauge railways in Italy were built with Italian metre gauge, which is actually 950 mm (3 ft 1 3/8 in) because historically the Italian track gauge was defined from the centres of the rail instead of the internationally accepted method of measuring the gauge from the inside edges of the rails. Several metre-gauge lines were built in northern Italy.

123 km 1,000 mm (3 ft 3 3/8 in) gauge (123 km electrified); 1,290 km 950 mm (3 ft 1 3/8 in) gauge (151 km electrified); 231 km 850 mm (2 ft 9 15/32 in) gauge (2008)

== 1200 mm gauge ==
1,200 mm (3 ft 11 1/4 in) narrow-gauge railways in Italy are:

- Central Funicular in Naples
- Gardena Ronda Express
- Principe–Granarolo rack railway

== 1100 mm gauge ==
The temporary Mont Cenis Railway (1868–1871) was 1,100 mm (3 ft 7 5/16 in) gauge.

== Metre-gauge lines (1000 mm) ==
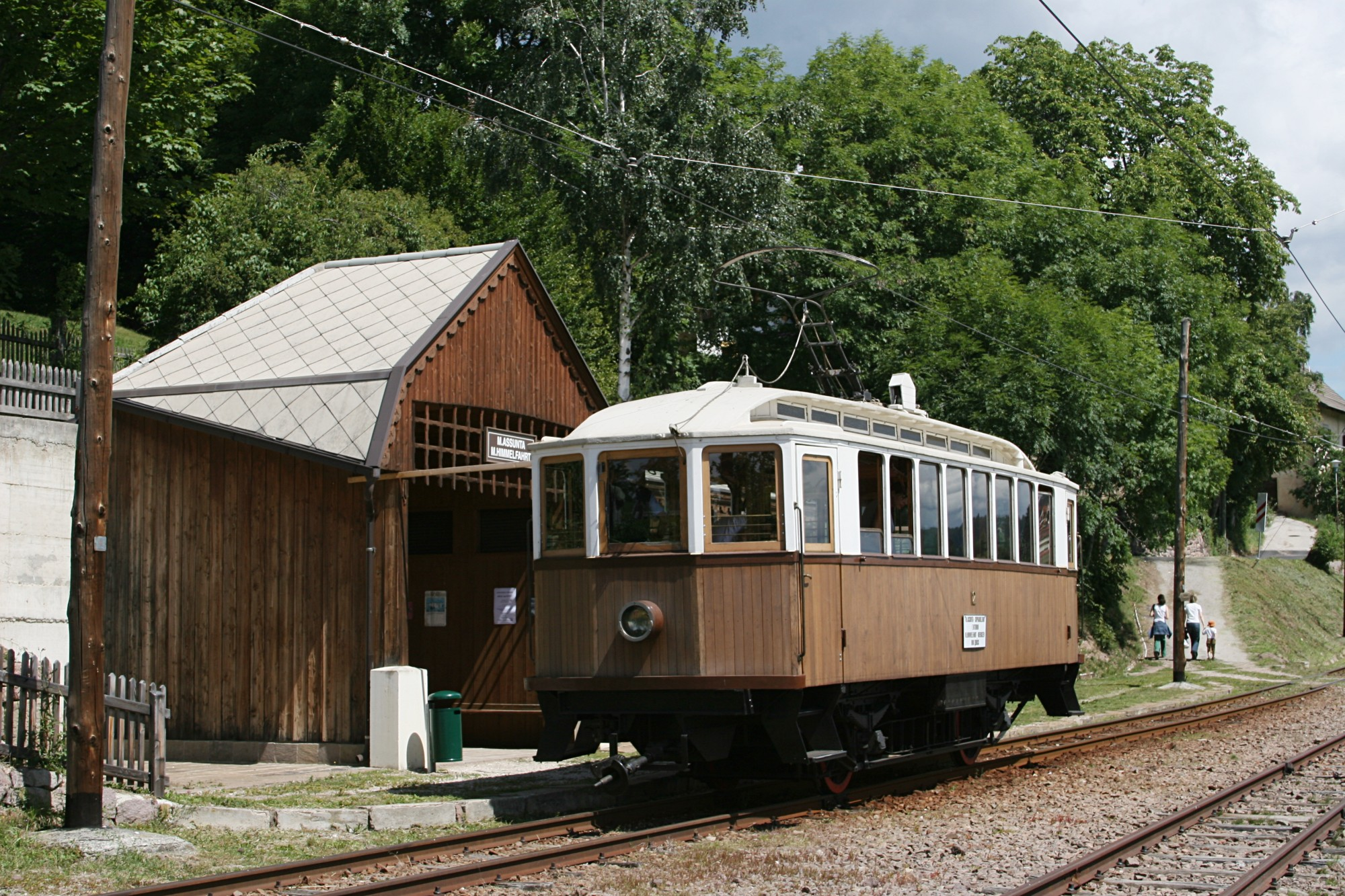
Railcar on the Rittnerbahn/Ferrovia del Renon

- Domodossola–Locarno railway between Domodossola, and Locarno, Switzerland.
- Ferrovia Genova–Casella in Genoa, Liguria.
- Laas-Lasa freight private railway to a marble cave, that uses a funicular.
- Mendel Funicular connecting the Überetsch plateau with the Mendel Pass.
- Trieste–Opicina tramway, with a funicular, in the city of Trieste.
- Rittnerbahn, or Ferrovia del Renon. in South Tyrol.
- Trento–Malè–Mezzana railway In Trentino only the lines from Trento to Malè and Mezzana are still operated by Trentino Trasporti. Project for extended to Fucine.

== Italian metre-gauge lines (950 mm) ==
Mostly found in Southern Italy

=== Calabria ===
In Calabria there is the Cosenza–Catanzaro Lido railway, with a branch to San Giovanni in Fiore, and two lines from Gioia Tauro. All are owned by Ferrovie della Calabria.

=== Naples area ===
- Circumvesuviana in the Eastern quadrant of the metropolitan area of Naples, connecting Naples and Sorrento, around the base of Mt. Vesuvius,

=== Rome ===
- The Rome–Giardinetti railway, in eastern Rome, still operates in 2025. It was the last operational segment of a much longer 950-mm gauge line, the 78.1-kilometre (48.5 mi) Rome–Fiuggi–Alatri–Frosinone railway. Closed since spring 2026 to be rebuild as a normal gauge tramway.

=== Sardinia ===
In Sardinia, a network of narrow-gauge lines (950 mm / 3 ft 1 3/8 in) was built, to complement the standard-gauge main network which covered the main cities and ports. The lines were:

- Siliqua–San Giovanni Suergiu–Calasetta (dismantled)
- Iglesias–Monteponi–San Giovanni Suergiu (dismantled)
- Monteponi–Portovesme (dismantled)
- Cagliari–Mandas–Isili–Sorgono
- Mandas–Gairo–Arbatax (tourist service only)
- Gairo–Jerzu (dismantled)
- Isili–Villamar–Villacidro (dismantled)
- Villamar–Ales (dismantled)
- Macomer–Bosa (dismantled between Bosa Marina and Bosa) (tourist service only)
- Macomer–Tirso–Nuoro
- Tirso–Ozieri (dismantled)
- Sassari–Alghero, Sassari–Sorso
- Sassari–Tempio Pausania–Luras–Palau (tourist service only)
- Luras–Monti (dismantled).

Of the lines which are still present, only

- Cagliari–Mandas–Isili
- Sassari–Alghero
- Sassari–Sorso
- Sassari–Nulvi
- Macomer–Nuoro

still carry regular passenger services, operated by Ferrovie della Sardegna. The others only operate a scenic tourist service known as Trenino Verde (little green train)

In Sassari, the Sassari Tram-train (or Metrosassari) is a 950mm-gauge tramway linking the railway station with the city centre.

=== Sicily ===
In Sicily, the Ferrovia Circumetnea railway runs around the Mount Etna. Other 950 mm (3 ft 1 3/8 in) narrow-gauge lines of Ferrovie dello Stato operated, but are now closed. The last of which was the Castelvetrano–Porto Empedocle, closed in 1985.

=== South-eastern Italy ===
In the Apulia and Basilicata regions, there are some railway lines connecting Bari, Potenza, Matera, and Avigliano. These are operated by Ferrovie Apulo Lucane.

== 850 mm gauge line ==
- Menaggio–Porlezza railway in the northern Italian province of Como, closed in 1939.

== Bosnian-gauge lines (760 mm) ==
- In Istria, a 760 mm (2 ft 5 15/16 in) narrow-gauge railway line called Parenzana was built from Trieste – Capodistria now Koper Slovenia – to Parenzo now Poreč Croatia (dismantled 1935).
- Val Gardena Railway in the Dolomites of northern Italy, closed in 1960.

== Decauville gauge (600 mm) ==
In South Tyrol there are two tourist lines using 600 mm (1 ft 11 5/8 in) gauge trains.

== See also ==
- History of rail transport in Italy
- Rail transport in Italy
