= Alto Adige (disambiguation) =

Alto Adige or South Tyrol is a province in northern Italy.

Alto Adige may also refer to:

- Alto Adige (newspaper), an Italian newspaper
- Alto Adige (district), a district in the Department of Benaco in the Cisalpine Republic, 1797–1798
- Department of Alto Adige, a department of the Napoleonic Kingdom of Italy, 1810–1814
- F.C. Südtirol, a football club based in the city of Bolzano also previously known as F.C. Südtirol - Alto Adige
