= Rally Stella Alpina =

Vintage motorsport race

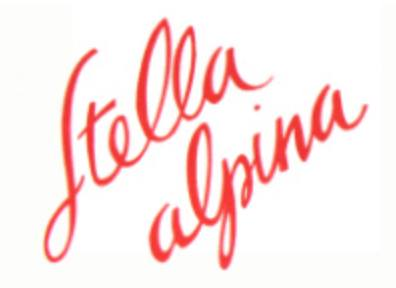
- Category: classic rally
- Country: Italy, Trentino-Alto Adige/Südtirol
- Inaugural season: 1947
- Folded: 1955
- Last Drivers' champion: (Belgium) Olivier Gendebien
- Last Constructors' champion: (Germany) Mercedes 300SL
- Official website: www.scuderiatrentinastorica.it

The Stella Alpina Rally is an annual vintage motorsport race, held annually since 1984 in the Italian Alps. It is a historical reconstruction of the earlier Stella Alpina Rally competition, originally held from 1947 to 1955. It takes place in Italy, in the second weekend of July, and lasts for three days.

The competition is organised by staff of the Scuderia Trentina Storica di Trento, headed by Enzo Siligardi, a member of the National Council of the Historical Italian Automobile Club. The main race is reserved for cars validated by the Automobile Club d'Italia (ASI) and built before 31 December 1955. Cars built between 1956 and 1984 are eligible to compete in the special Stella Alpina Touring rally, which also takes place for three days in the traditional race format.

== History ==
=== The First Years (1947-1955) ===
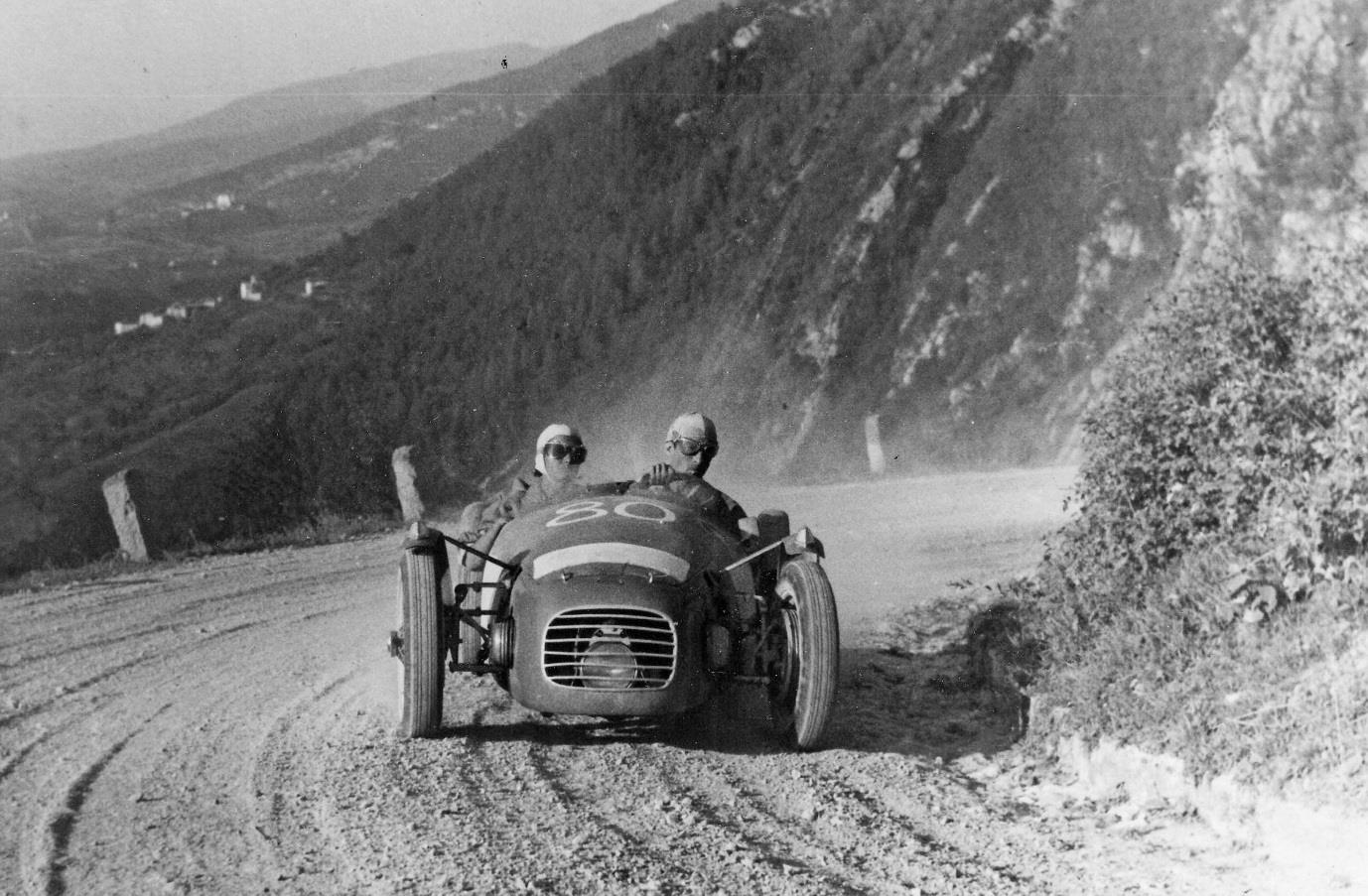
1949, Maria Teresa de Filippis and Giuseppe Ruggiero.

Stella Alpina was created in 1947 as an international race open to all kinds of sport automobiles. It was organized by the Automobile Club of Trento, in Italy.

The journalist Giovanni Canestrini had the idea of a race which starts and ends its stages in the same area. This made it easier for the journalists to follow the race without a rigorous regime of travel and writing. Canestrini called this “ideal race” Quadrifoglio Alpino, because it was divided into four stages within the alpine region of Merano, Italy. During the postwar period, the motoring movement of Trento was involved in a sort of collective euphoria transformed in “desire of doing”, in the will of creating something important and completely new. In the winter of 1946, the chairman of the Automobile Club of Trento, the count Sigismondo Manci, sought permission from the Commissione Sportiva Automobilistica Italiana in Rome for a change in the Mille Miglia track, in order to make it pass through Trento. The request was refused on a number of occasions.

Mancini did not give up and proposed to create a new rally race, which only takes place in Trento, utilizing the idea of Canestrini. The first edition of the race was launched in 1947 and there were 51 participants at the start line. In the second edition the track was extended to 1400 km and in 1949 the race became even harder, due to new rules from the organiser: Besides changes to the track, the maximum velocity of 15 different categories was increased. There were further changes in the regulations for the fourth edition, which transformed Stella Alpina in to a less strict and more open competition. The timed race trials occurred at the following mountain pass stages: Passo della Mendola, Passo Sommo, Passo dello Stelvio, Passo del Tonale, Passo Rolle, Passo di Falzarego and Monte Bondone.

In 1955 there were 96 participants, including members of some of the most prestigious car racing teams of the time, such as the Sant Ambroeus of Milan

In the same year the original Stella Alpina rally ended, along with other automobile races on Italian open roads and public streets. It restarted in 1984 as a vintage car race, utilizing the same road course and traveling through the same stages.

=== Recent Times (1984-present) ===
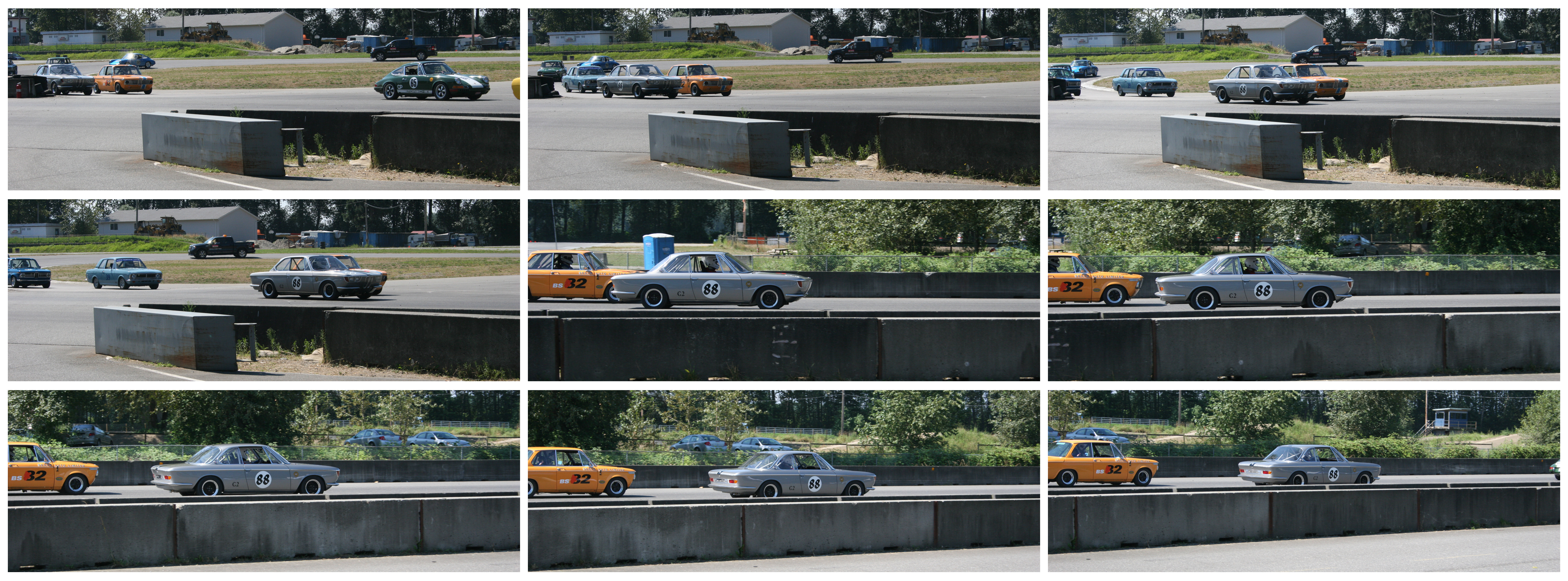
Vintage cars during Stella Alpina Rally in 2007.

Some years after the termination of the races, people around Italy and all over the world started to organize themselves in order to recall all the car contests which were not competed anymore since the 50s. In particular, the Stella Alpina Rally saw its first commemoration on June 30, 1984. This event was revived by the Scuderia Storica di Trento in order to honor one of the most important and famous competitions of the last century. The start line of the first commemoration was in Piazza Dante in Trento and the event was followed by a huge audience that determined the success and the continuity of the whole project. Due to this, the Rally is still one of the most famous and important events for lovers of classic cars both in Italy, but internationally.

The new version of the race is more an event than a competition. It has become a contest between classic cars built before 1955 and approved by the A.S.I. (Automotoclub Storico Italiano). The race is three days long starting from Trento and finishing at Riva del Garda with a complex route of 600 kilometers.

The modern Stella Alpina Rally takes place in July on the original route. Along the track there are 99 points where the speed of the competitors is timed in order to test their ability with their classic cars. In the end the winner will not only be chosen by the criterion of who was the fastest, but also who received the fewest penalties during the race.

The XXIX memorial edition of the historical rally took place for three days on the second weekend of July 2014 and had participants from Italy, Switzerland, Germany and Japan.

== The Route ==
The “Stella Alpina” vintage sports cars race always takes place for three days (during the weekend), from Trento to Riva del Garda (about 600 km in total), including the route along the main Dolomites Passes. The race is preceded on the first day with checks of all cars and equipment. The first stage starts from Trento, and runs for 80 kilometers through the Lakes' Valley to Comano Terme. The following day the second and longest stage of the race takes place in the Dolomites. It starts and finishes in Madonna di Campiglio, passing through Bolzano, Alpe di Siusi, Val Gardena, Val Badia, Val di Fassa and Fiemme, Piana Rotaliana, Val di Non and Val di Sole. Stage Two also passes through Gardena, Campolongo and Pordoi. It is about 340 kilometers long. After arriving at Madonna di Campiglio, the Gala dinner is followed by an overnight stay at Carlo Magno. On Stage 3 the rally stage is 80 kilometers to Riva del Garda, where a special lunch and the award ceremony is held.

== List of Winners ==
Driver	Car	Year
(Italy) Piero Taruffi	Lancia Aprilia	1947
(Italy) Nuccio Bertone	Fiat Stanguellini	1948
(Italy) Franco Simontacchi	Fiat Stanguellini	1949
(Italy) Salvatore Ammendola	Alfa Romeo 6C 2500	1950
(Italy) Salvatore Ammendola	Alfa Romeo 6C 2500	1951
(Italy) Ovidio Capelli	Fiat 8V	1952
(Italy) Salvatore Ammendola	Lancia Aurelia 2500	1953
(Italy) Giuseppe Crespi	Alfa Romeo 1900 SS Zagato	1954
(Belgium) Olivier Gendebien	Mercedes 300SL	1955

== Bibliography ==
- Pfundner, Martin. Alpine Trials and Rallies: 1910 To 1973, Veloce Publishing Ltd 2005.
- Cifarelli, Nanni. STELLA ALPINA. Storia, documenti e molte immagini della gara storica e delle rievocazioni dal 1947 al 2006, EDIZIONI 31 2007.
- Canestrini, Giovanni. Una vita con le corse, Calderini,1962
