= Still Blind =

- Also known as: Skritek, Worbet, Godzilla Intermezzo, Embryonic Jam
- Origin: Unterland, South Tyrol, Italy
- Genres: Thrash metal
- Years active: 1986–present (Embryonic Jam)
- Label: Blindness Records
- Members: Reinhold Giovanett; Hartmann Giovanett; Helmut Giovanett; Lorenz Rinner; David Tomasi; Steve Williams; Steve Scott

Still Blind are a heavy metal band from the Unterland area in South Tyrol, Italy formed in 1986 by the brothers Reinhold Giovanett, Hartmann Giovanett and Helmuth Giovanett.

== History ==
One of the first metal bands in South Tyrol, Still Blind achieved international success during the 1980s, especially thanks to their first album Still Blind (1989) and the following European tour. As one of the most successful and internationally popular bands from South Tyrol (Úplná databáze populární hudby, UMD, 1999), together with Graveworm and Skanners, Still Blind continued their career with the 1991 album Whales. After touring for years with the same line up, the band officially split in 2001, but the Giovanett Brothers continued parallel careers within several projects (Italian Metal Encyclopedia, 2001). Helmuth Giovanett started concentrating on ethnic music, and his brother Reinhold published with Josef Oberhollenzer two demo-CDs: Kaspar Hauser (1999) and Hinter den Bergen (2000). In 2004 Reinhold Giovanett founded Godzilla Intermezzo with the guitarist Roland Novak and the drummer Zeljko Marinković. The project started as a Motörhead cover band, but became more and more doom–progressive metal oriented, with the album Orgasmatron, published in 2005. The follower band of Still Blind was founded in 2009 by the guitarist Hartmann Giovanett with the name Embryonic Jam. In the years between 2002 and 2007 various names and line ups followed, but the final line up was presented for the first live sessions of Embryonic Jam, with Hartmann Giovanett—guitars, David Tomasi—vocals, bass and Lorenz Rinner—drums.

== Band members ==
Current members
Embryonic Jam

- Hartmann Giovanett – guitars (1986–present)
- Lorenz Rinner – drums (2009–present)
- David Tomasi – lead vocals, bass (2009–present)

Former members
Godzilla Intermezzo

- Reinhold Giovanett – lead vocals (2004–2006)
- Roland Novak – guitars (2004–2006)
- Zeljko Marinković – drums (2004–2006)

Original members
Still Blind

- Reinhold Giovanett – lead vocals, bass
- Hartmann Giovanett – guitars
- Helmuth Giovanett – drums

== Discography ==
- S.B., Demotape, 1987
- Still Blind, EP, 1989
- Whales, Full Length + CD, 1991
- Traum:sturz, Mini-CD, 1996
- Demo, CD, 2003 (Skritek)
- Live I, CD, 2004 (Worbet)
- Live II, CD, 2005 (Worbet)
- Demo, CD, 2010 (Embryonic Jam)

The newest DVD with the name Embryonic Jam, Metal from the North, has been released 2013 at the CRAM Centre for Art Research, and will present the concert performed in 2009 together with B Painfull, Hungerstrike and Black Thongues.

== Published sources ==
- Floropoulos, D (2009) Still Blind, in Encyclopaedia Metallum
- Della Gioppa, G (2005), Still Blind, in Italian Metal Legion – 1980–1991 – The Days of Dream, Andromeda Relix Edizioni
- Franceschini, C (2005), Keine Lemmynge, Neue Südtiroler Tageszeitung
- Schäfer, W (2000), Whales, Rock Hard Deutschland, Nr. 64
