= Überetsch Railway =

Coordinates: 46°25′04″N 11°15′04″E

Overview
- Status: withdrawn
- Termini: Bolzano; Mendel Funicular
- Stations: 6

Service
- Type: passenger/freight

History
- Opened: December 16th 1898
- Closed: June 28th 1971

Technical
- Line length: 13,00 km
- Track gauge: 1,435 mm (4 ft 8 1/2 in)
- Electrification: 1100 V dc (third rail feed from Bolzano FS to switch onto FS line)

The Überetsch Railway (German: Überetscher Bahn; Italian: Transatesina) connected Bolzano with the Mendel Funicular. This line was part of a rail sightseeing tour around the Mendelpass. The tour was made up of five railway lines and was often used by tourists.

== Track ==
Just after the station of Bolzano the track branched off from the Brennerbahn and ran along the Eisack river. The line crossed the Talfer river and after two small stations (Ponte Roma and Ponte Resia) the line became split: one track proceeded to Meran and further to the Vinschgerbahn and one track branched away leftwards toward the low mountain range plateau of Überetsch. After a long bridge over the Adige river, the line got steeper and after two short tunnels reached the Überetsch plateau. Here the trains only stopped in Eppan, Kaltern and Sankt Anton, near the Mendel Funicular station. The strange thing was, that the track to the Sankt Anton station left the mainline before it arrived to the Kaltern station, so the trains had to run to Kaltern station, drive back to the switch, change driving direction again and then go further to the Sankt Anton station.

== History ==
The railroad had been built to reach the Überetsch plateau more easily. The two biggest villages on the plateau Kaltern and Eppan are to this day important tourist destinations. The railroad made it easier to get tourists to the villages and the wine from the villages to the station of Bolzano, where it was loaded onto international freight trains.

== Today ==
The line was finally abandoned on June 28, 1971. At the Eppan station, the tracks were replaced by a new street to guide traffic around the village. In the early 2000s, parts of the line were converted to a bicycle trail. Due to the number of bicycle riders, the roads from Bolzano towards the Überetsch plateau are jammed by traffic, and officials in Kaltern/Caldaro and Eppan/Appiano are supporting the idea to reactivate the line as a commuter.

== Gallery ==
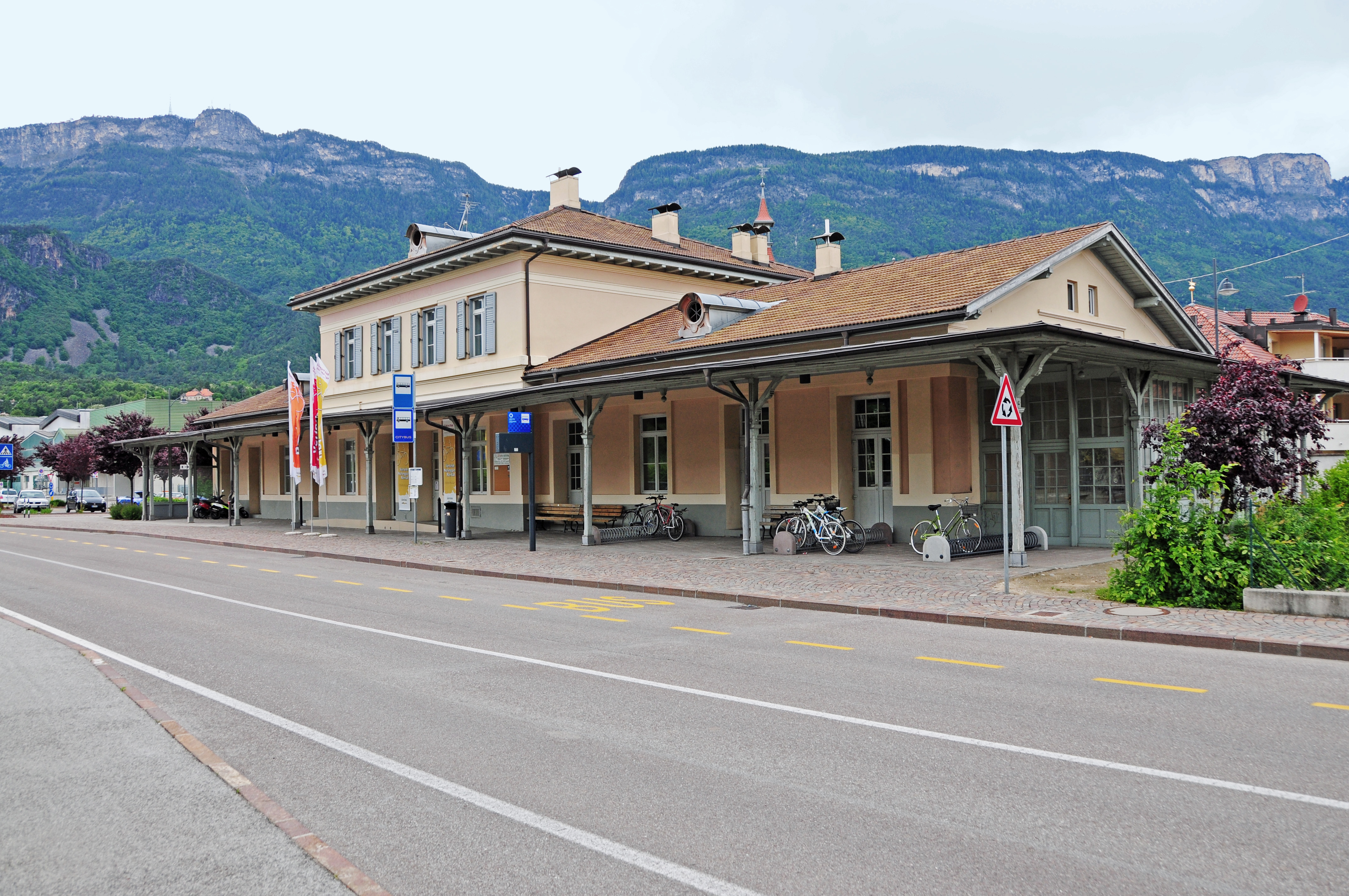
Eppan station

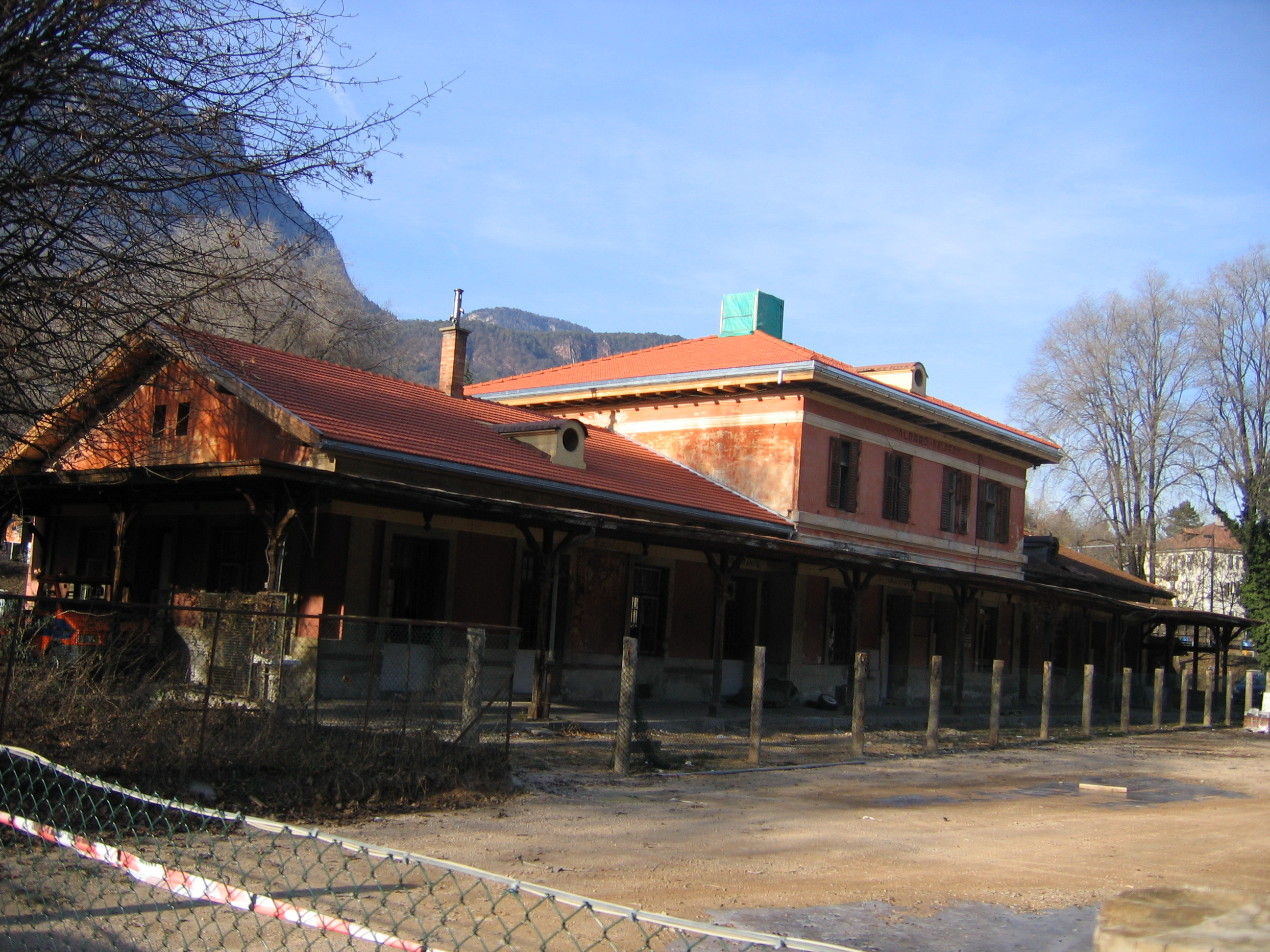
Kaltern station

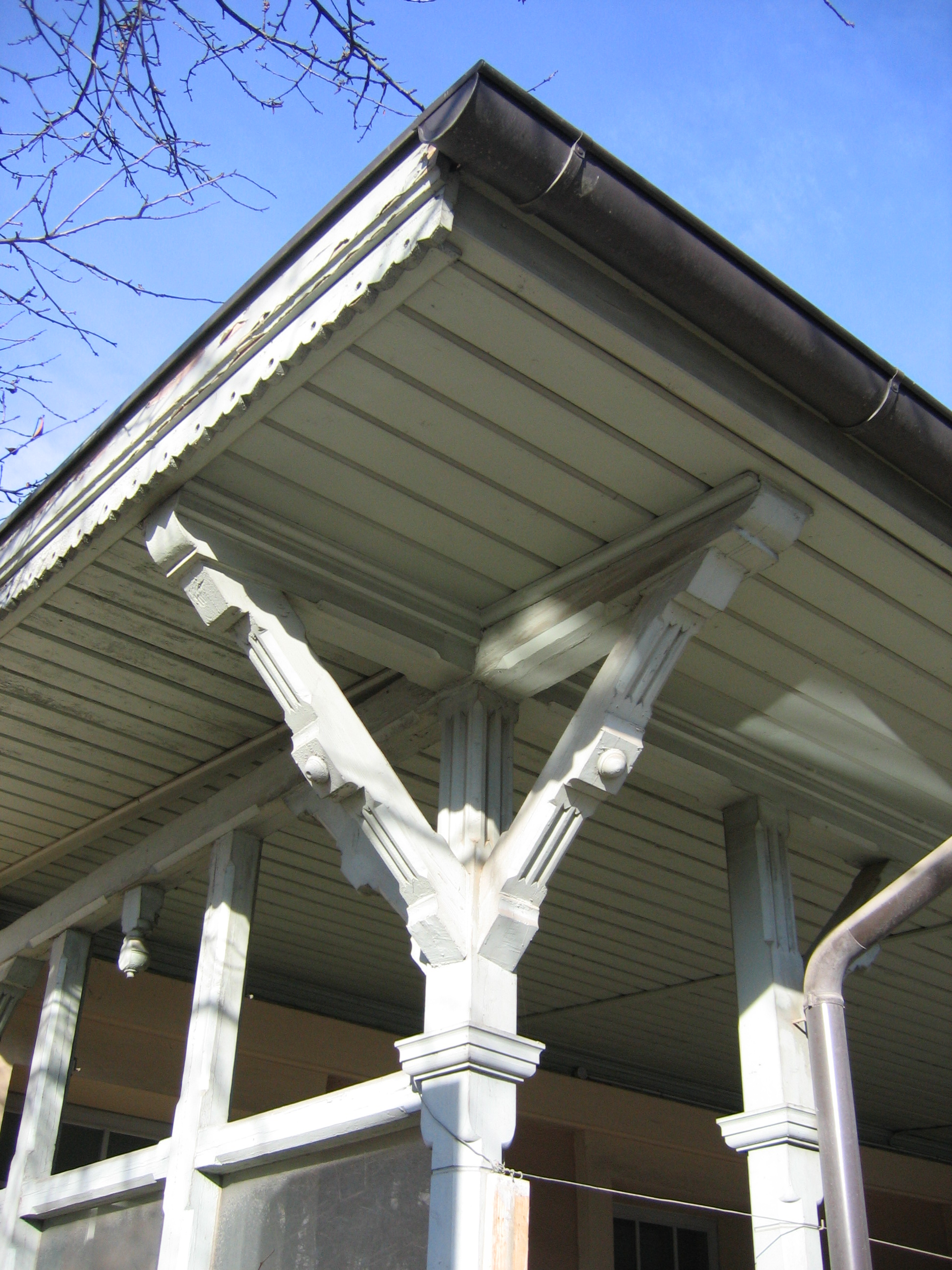
Detail Eppan station

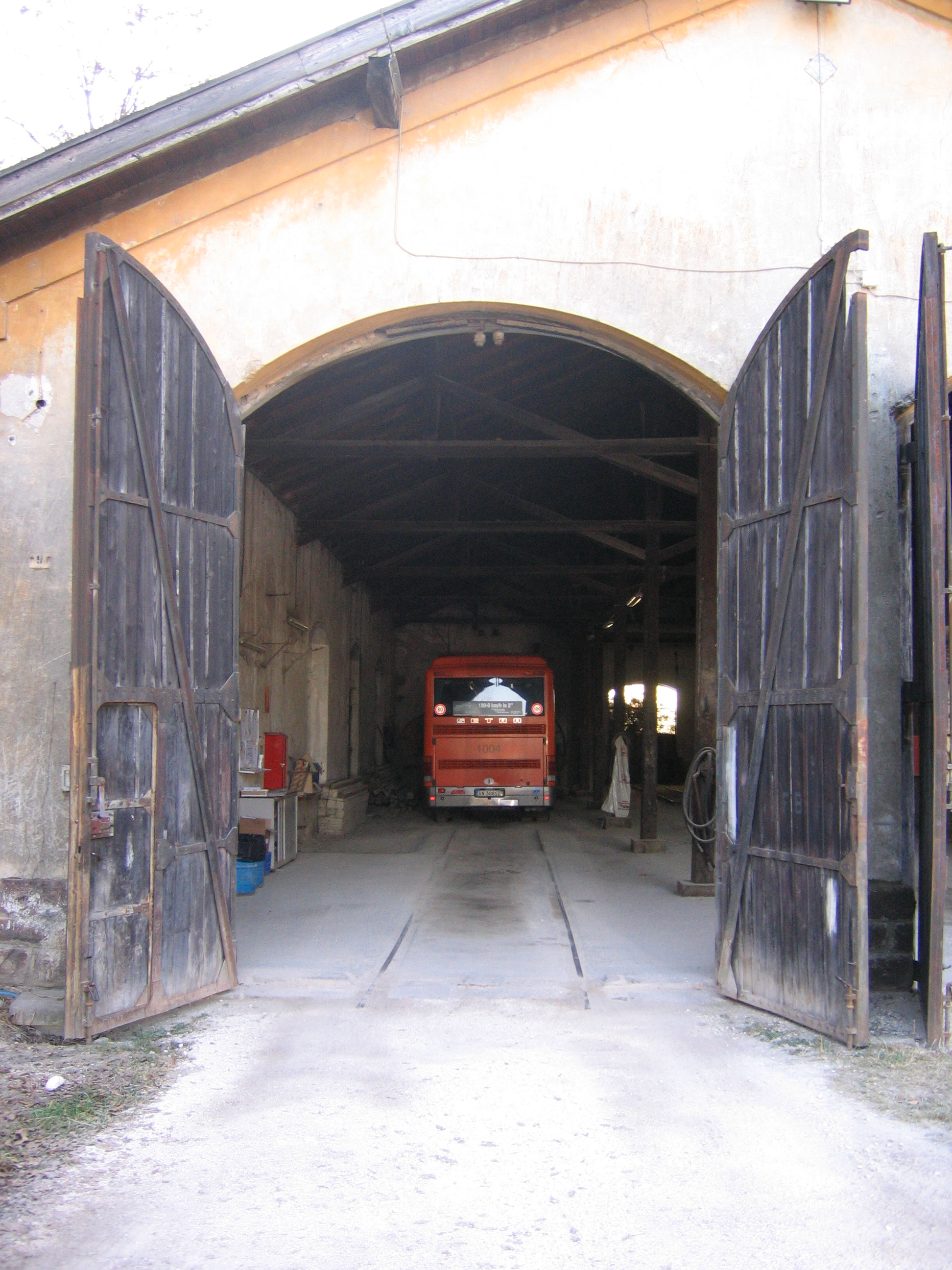
Garage at the Kaltern station

== Literature ==
- Josef Dultinger: Vergessene Vergangenheit. Verlag Dr. Rudolf Erhard, Rum 1982
- Josef Dultinger: Auf schmaler Spur durch Südtirol. Verlag Dr. Rudolf Erhard, Rum 1982
