= Terlan =

- Comune
- Gemeinde Terlan; Comune di Terlano
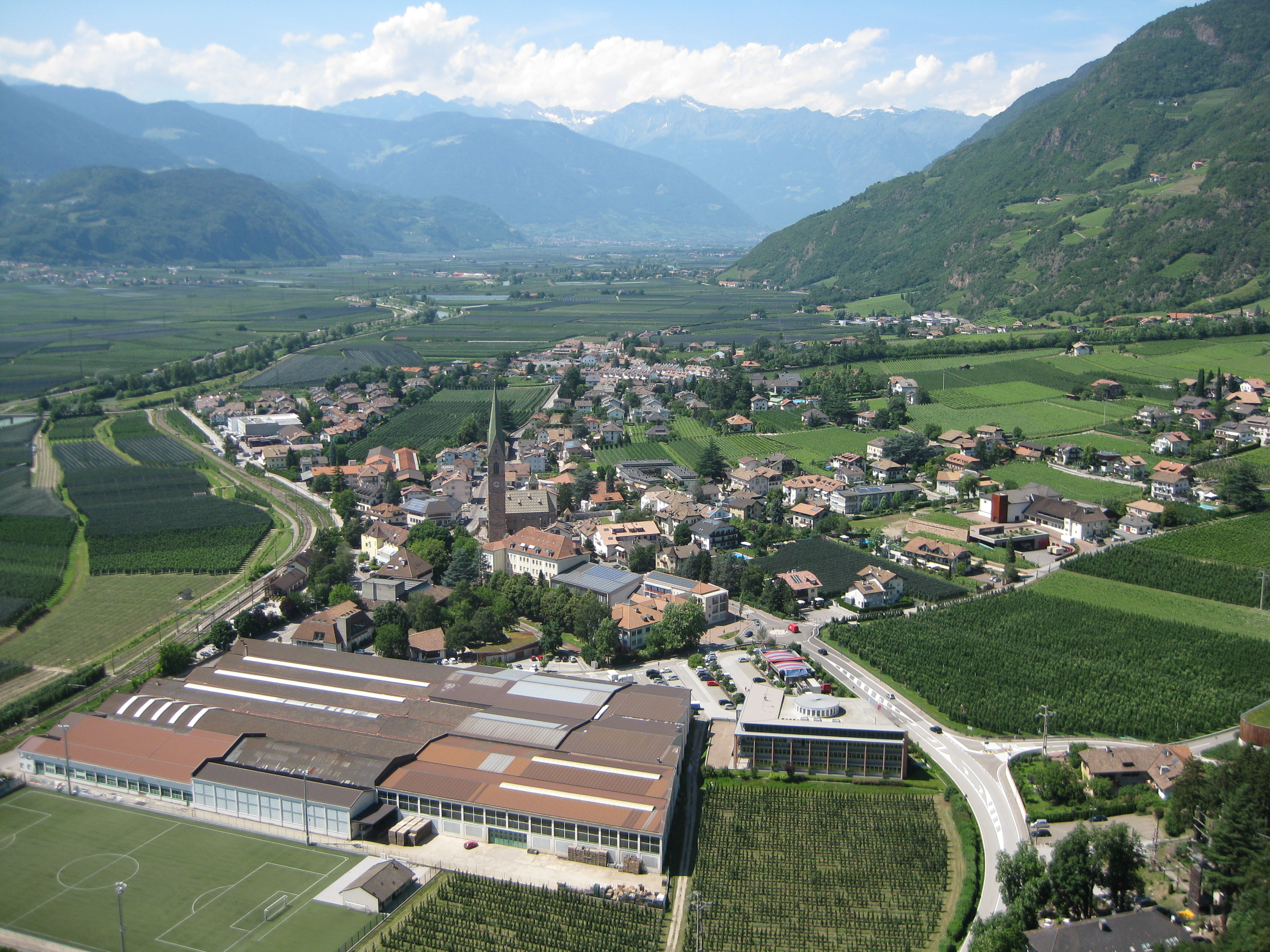
- View from Neuhaus Castle

- Location within Italy Location within Trentino-Alto Adige/Südtirol
- Coordinates: 46°32′N 11°15′E
- Country: Italy
- Region: Trentino-Alto Adige/Südtirol
- Province: South Tyrol (BZ)
- Frazioni: Siebeneich (Settequerce), Vilpian (Vilpiano)

Government
  - Mayor: Hansjörg Zelger (SVP)

Area
  - Total: 18.7 km^{2} (7.2 sq mi)
- Elevation: 250 m (820 ft)

Population (Nov. 2010)
  - Total: 4,128
  - Density: 221/km^{2} (572/sq mi)
- Demonym(s): German: Terlaner; Italian: terlanesi
- Time zone: UTC+1 (CET)
  - Summer (DST): UTC+2 (CEST)
- Postal code: 39018
- Dialing code: 0471
- Website: Official website

Terlan (German pronunciation: [ˈtɛrlan]; Italian: Terlano [terˈlaːno]) is a comune (municipality) in South Tyrol in northern Italy.

== Geography ==
The municipal area is situated within the Adige Valley, about 9 kilometres (6 mi) northwest of the city of Bolzano. Terlan is famous for its wine and asparagus production. It is the northernmost comune of the Überetsch-Unterland district, bordering the municipalities of Andrian, Eppan, Bolzano, Gargazon, Mölten, Nals, and Jenesien.

As of November 30, 2010, it had a population of 4,128 and an area of 18.7 square kilometres (7.2 mi^{2}).

=== Frazioni ===
The municipality of Terlan contains the frazioni (subdivisions, mainly villages and hamlets) Siebeneich (Settequerce) and Vilpian (Vilpiano).

== History ==
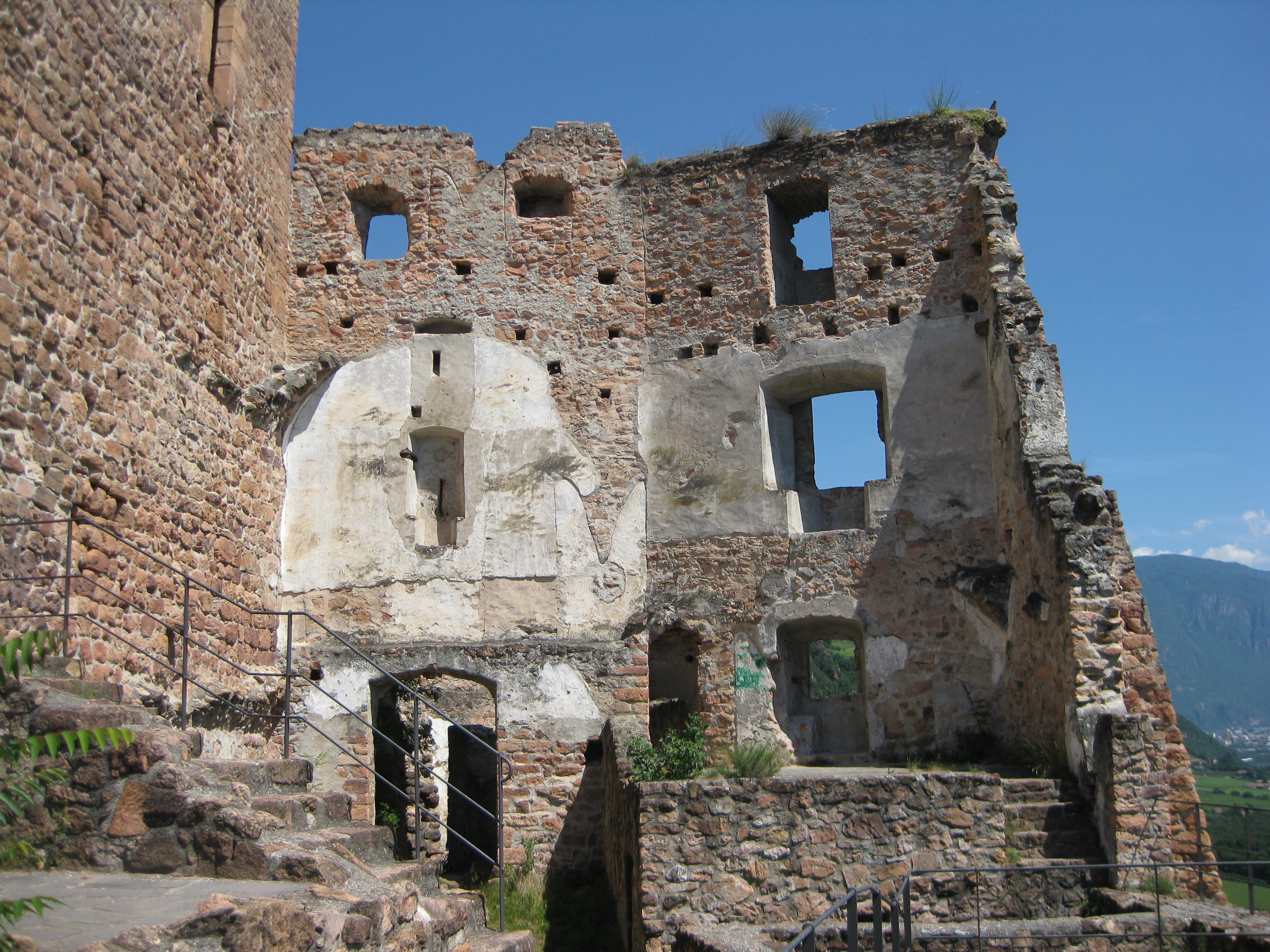
Neuhaus Castle ruins

The settlement of Torilan was first mentioned in a 923 deed of the Salzburg archbishops. About 1200, the Counts of Tyrol had Neuhaus Castle erected high above the Adige valley. The fortress was later held by the Gorizia-Tyrol dynasty and in the 19th century received the name Maultasch Castle, after Countess Margaret whose residencies are however not substantiated. Under the reign of the Habsburg archdukes Frederick IV and Sigismund of Austria, it was the centre of an important lead (galena) and silver mining area, including several furnaces and loading stations on the Adige river.

=== Coat-of-arms ===
The emblem show an open gate with guelph merlon of argent on gules background. It is the arms of Lord Niedertor who acquired the castle in 1397 and ruled the village until 1559 contributing in the building of the Parish church. The arms were granted in 1966 and decorate the church too.

== Society ==
=== Linguistic distribution ===
According to the 2024 census, 79.20% of the population speak German, 20.47% Italian and 0.33% Ladin as first language.

=== Demographic evolution ===
Historical population

Year	Pop.	±%
1860	?	—
1870	?	—
1880	1,620	—
1900	?	—
1910	1,908	—

Year	Pop.	±%
1921	2,035	+6.7%
1931	2,244	+10.3%
1936	2,341	+4.3%
1951	2,661	+13.7%
1961	2,716	+2.1%

Year	Pop.	±%
1971	2,882	+6.1%
1981	3,012	+4.5%
1991	3,117	+3.5%
2001	3,579	+14.8%

Source: Data from ISTAT
