= Mendel funicular =

Coordinates: 46.4125°N 11.2194°E

Overview
- Status: operational
- Termini: Sankt Anton, Kaltern; Mendel Pass
- Stations: 2

Service
- Type: passenger

History
- Opened: October 19, 1903

Technical
- Line length: 2.37 km (1.47 mi)
- Track gauge: 1,000 mm (3 ft 3 3/8 in)
- Electrification: yes

The Mendel Funicular, (German: Mendelbahn, Italian: Funicolare della Mendola [funikoˈlaːre della ˈmendola]) is a funicular railway in Italy. It connects the Überetsch plateau with the Mendel Pass.

== Track ==
In the twelve minutes of the journey trains rise 854 metres (2,802 ft). The whole track is located in a rocky region sometimes covered by a forest, and this needs many bridges and tunnels.

== History ==
The funicular was planned by Emil Strub as part of a link to connect Bolzano with the Mendel Pass, by linking to the St. Anton terminus of the Überetsch Railway. In 1903 Emperor Franz Joseph I of Austria opened the line itself after nearly one year of construction. The line was at the time one of the lengthiest funiculars in Europe. Until 1934 tourists could use the funicular and some other railways to make a journey around the Mendel.

== Today ==
Today the line is still working, and often used by tourists to reach the Mendel Pass. In 2004 there was an accident on the funicular, in which a driver lost his life.

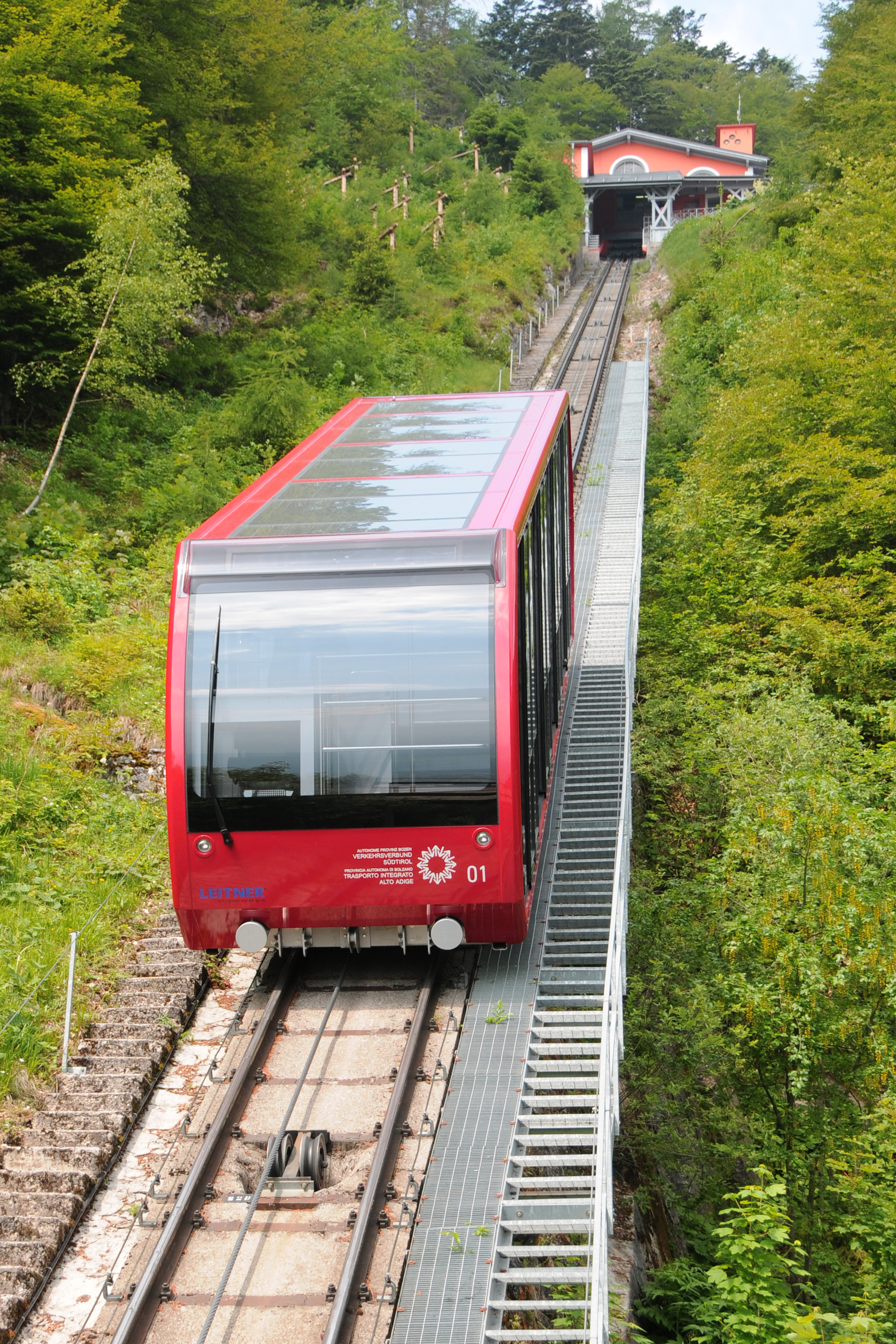
Arriving at Mendel Pass

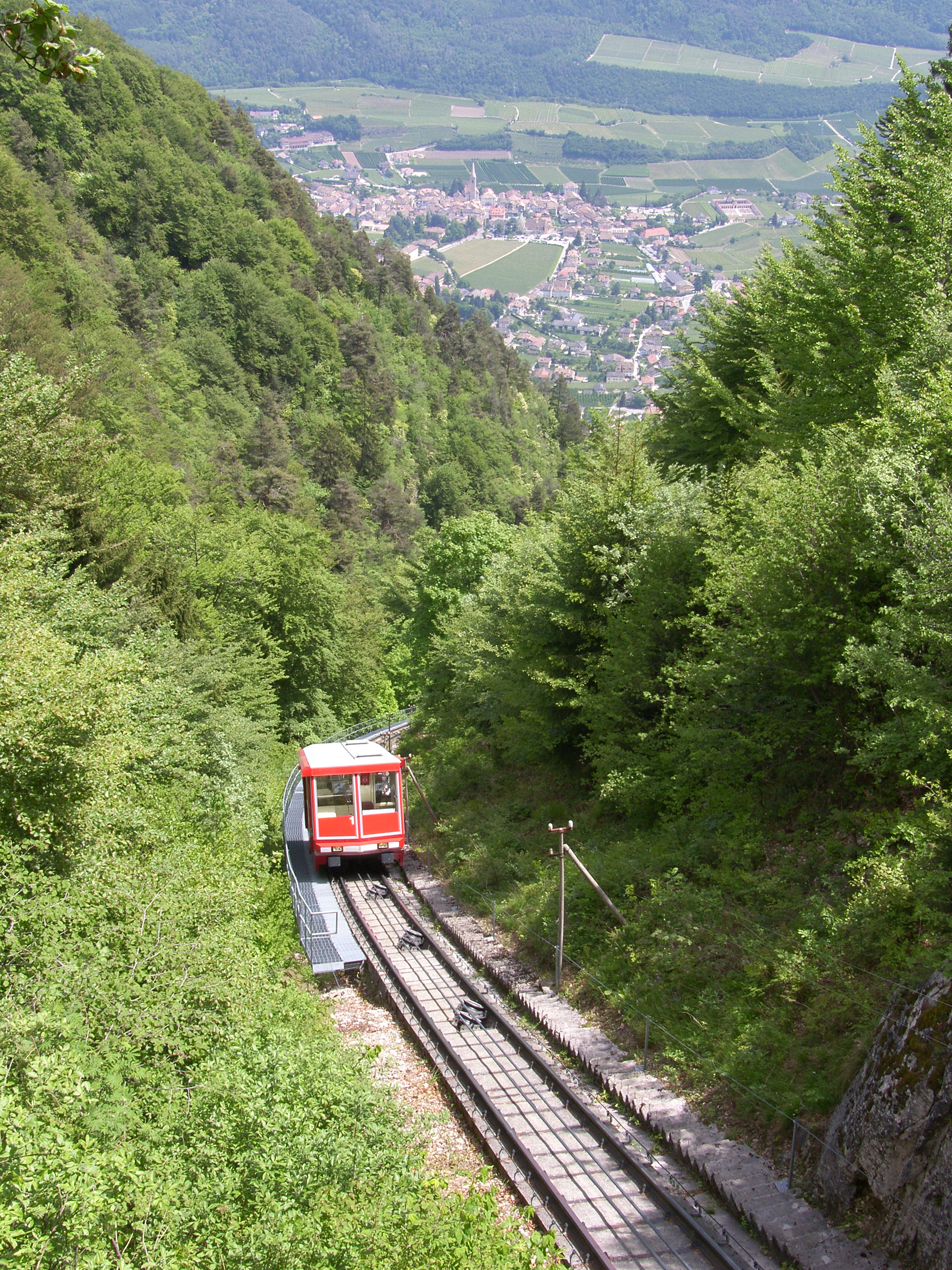
On the line

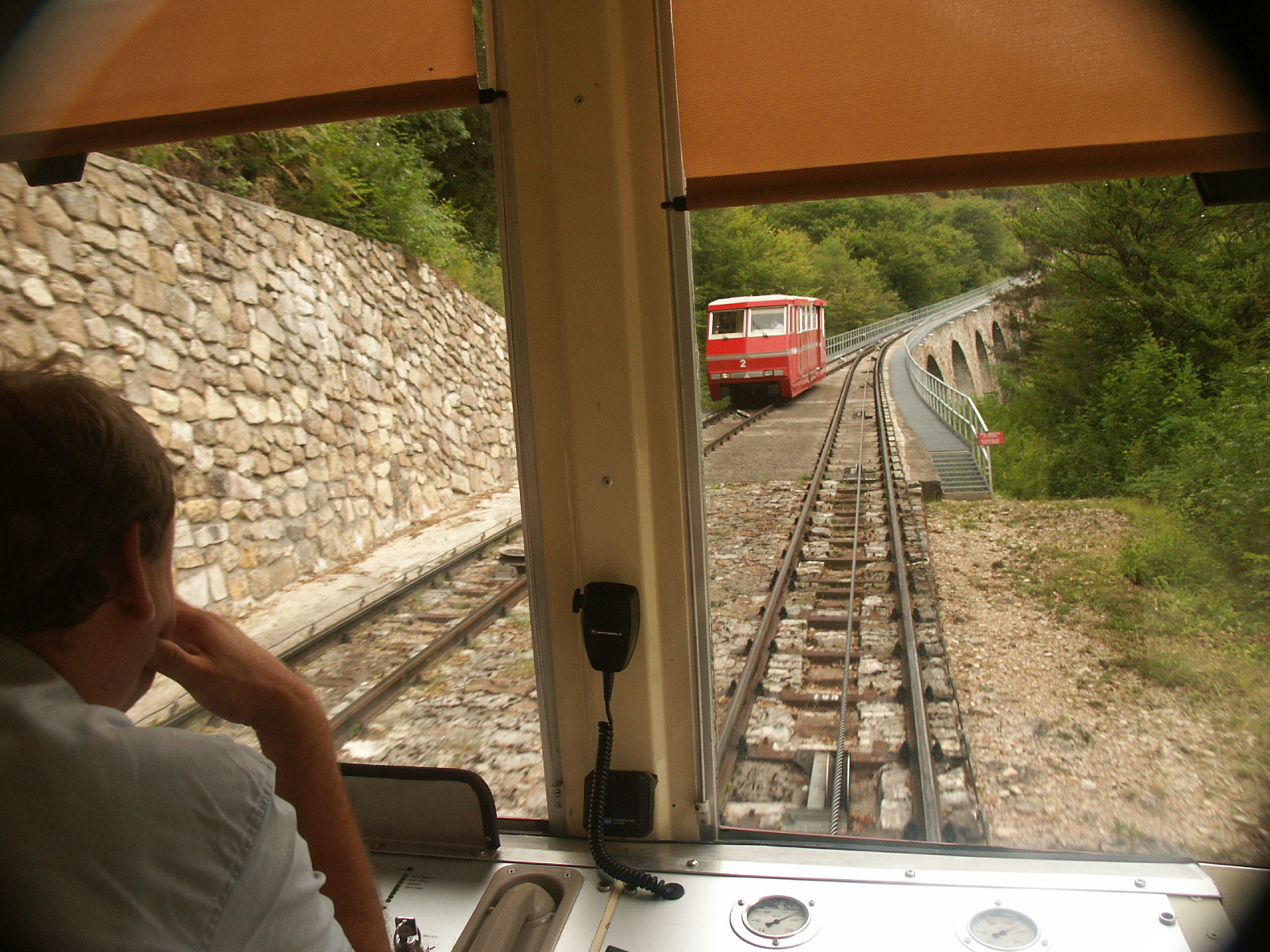
View from behind the driver

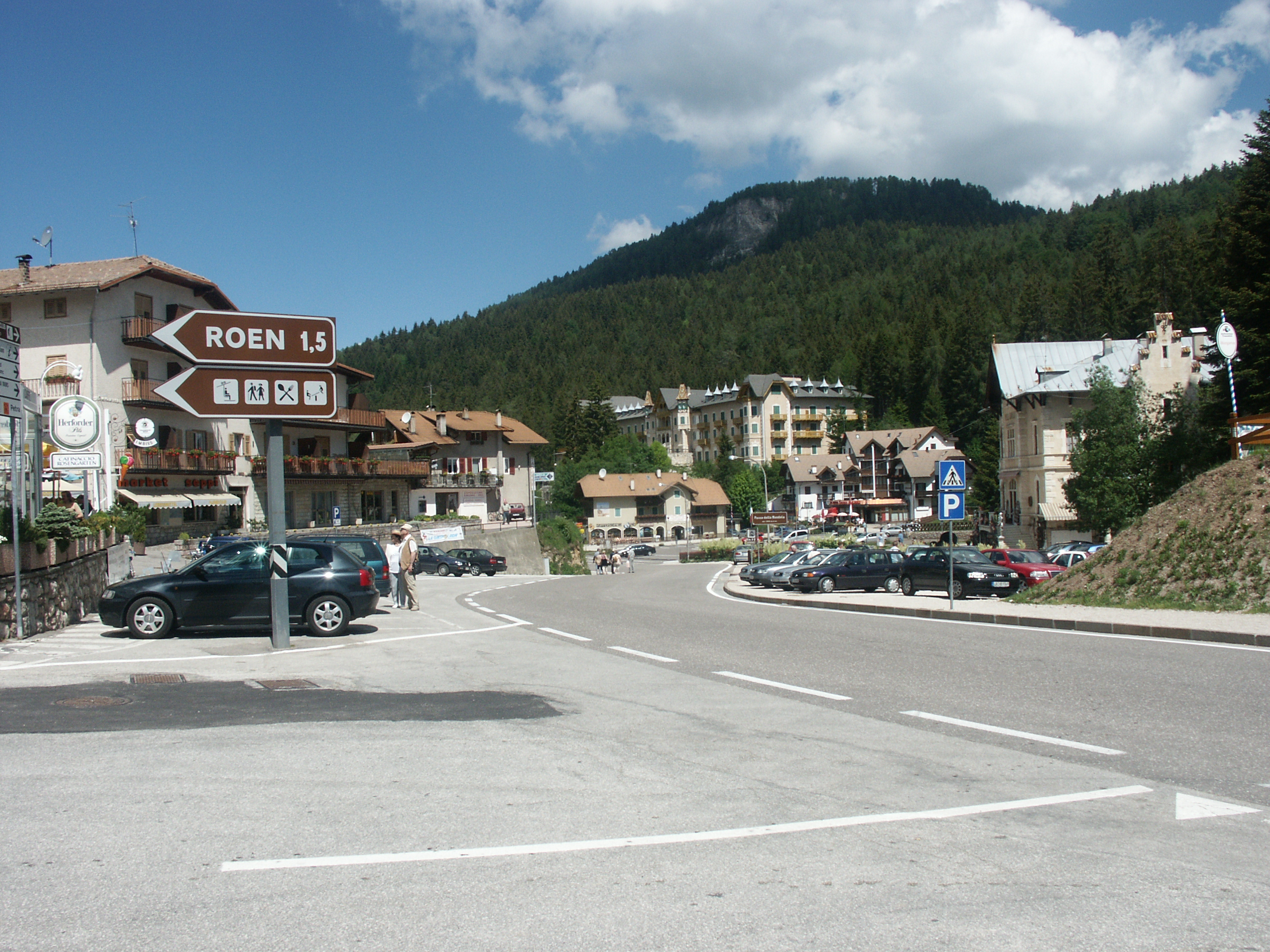
At the Mendel Pass

== See also ==
- List of funicular railways
