= Vöran =

- Comune
- Gemeinde Vöran; Comune di Verano
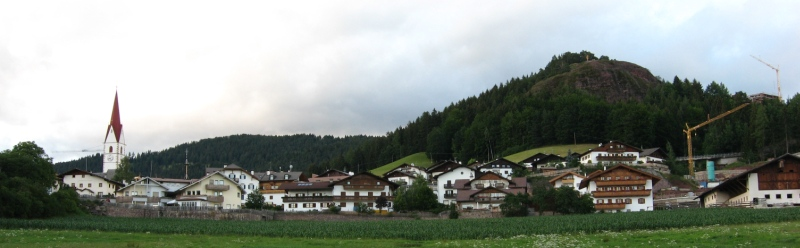
- View of Vöran

- Coat of arms

- Location within Italy Location within Trentino-Alto Adige/Südtirol
- Coordinates: 46°36′N 11°14′E
- Country: Italy
- Region: Trentino-Alto Adige/Südtirol
- Province: South Tyrol (BZ)
- Frazioni: Aschl (Eschio)

Government
  - Mayor: Daniela Mittelberger

Area
  - Total: 22.1 km^{2} (8.5 sq mi)

Population (Nov. 2010)
  - Total: 927
  - Density: 41.9/km^{2} (109/sq mi)
- Demonym(s): German: Vöraner; Italian: di Verano
- Time zone: UTC+1 (CET)
  - Summer (DST): UTC+2 (CEST)
- Postal code: 39010
- Dialing code: 0473
- Website: Official website

Vöran (German: [ˈføːran]; Italian: Verano [veˈraːno]) is a comune (municipality) in South Tyrol in northern Italy, located about 14 kilometres (9 mi) northwest of the city of Bolzano.

== Geography ==
As of November 30, 2010, it had a population of 927 and an area of 22.1 square kilometres (8.5 mi^{2}).

The municipality of Vöran contains the hamlet of Aschl.

Vöran borders the following municipalities: Hafling, Mölten, Merano, Burgstall, and Sarntal.

== History ==
=== Coat-of-arms ===
The emblem is tierced per fess: the first of azure, the second a yoke on or and the third of gules. The insignia symbolize some peculiarities of the municipality. The yoke is referred to the cattle-breeding and the agriculture, the red to the mountains rich in porphyry and the azure to the blue-sky. The emblem was granted in 1967.

== Society ==
=== Linguistic distribution ===
According to the 2024 census, 98.53% of the population speak German and 1.47% Italian as first language.

=== Demographic evolution ===
Historical population

Year	Pop.	±%
1860	?	—
1870	?	—
1880	658	—
1900	?	—
1910	565	—

Year	Pop.	±%
1921	539	−4.6%
1931	544	+0.9%
1936	618	+13.6%
1951	637	+3.1%
1961	617	−3.1%

Year	Pop.	±%
1971	640	+3.7%
1981	694	+8.4%
1991	795	+14.6%
2001	880	+10.7%

Source: Data from ISTAT
