= Mölten =

- Comune
- Gemeinde Mölten; Comune di Meltina
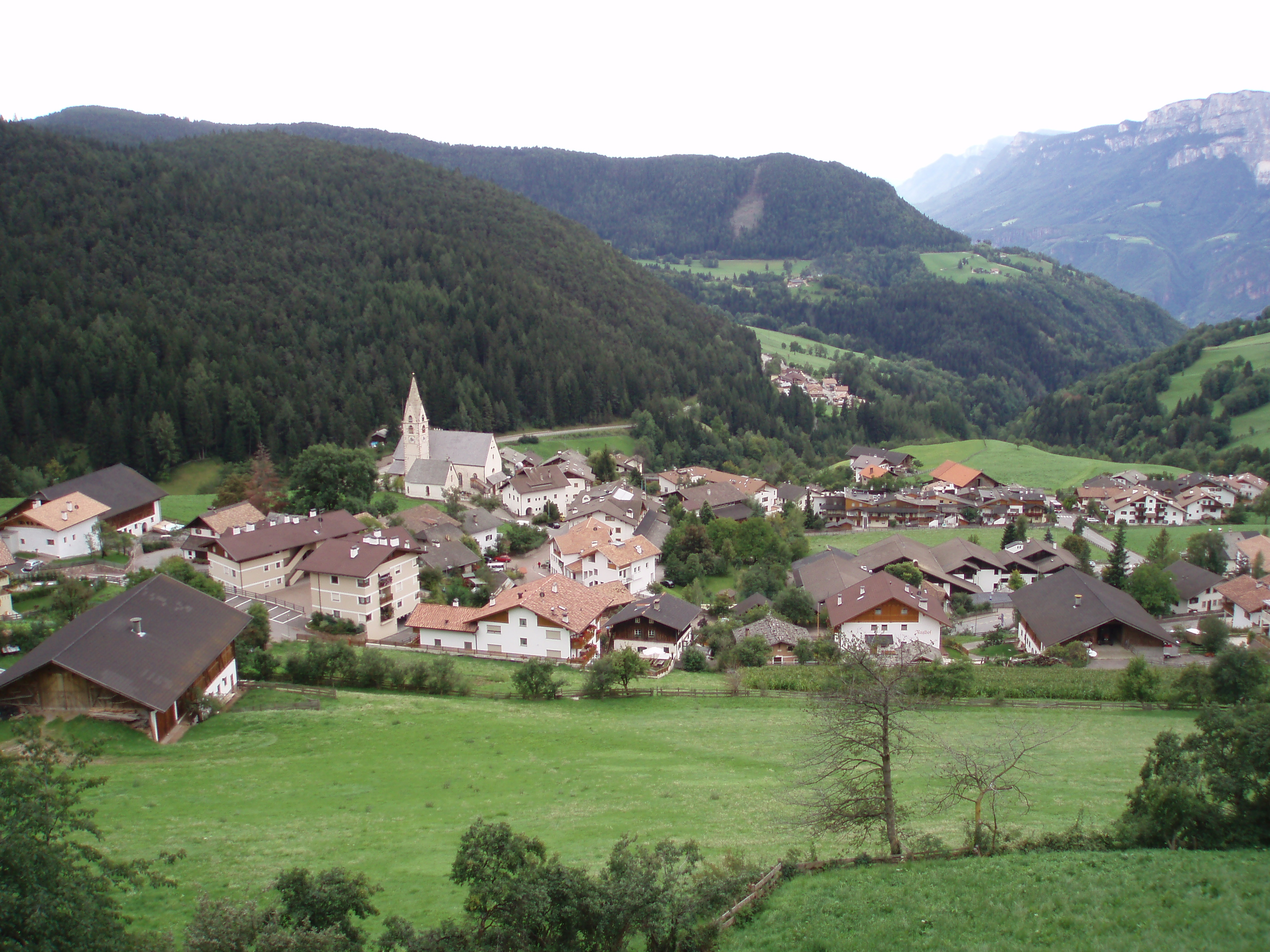
- View of Mölten

- Location within Italy Location within Trentino-Alto Adige/Südtirol
- Coordinates: 46°35′N 11°15′E
- Country: Italy
- Region: Trentino-Alto Adige/Südtirol
- Province: South Tyrol (BZ)
- Frazioni: Schlaneid (Salonetto), Verschneid (Frassineto), Versein (Vallesina)

Government
  - Mayor: Walter Gruber

Area
  - Total: 36.9 km^{2} (14.2 sq mi)

Population (Nov. 2010)
  - Total: 1,622
  - Density: 44.0/km^{2} (114/sq mi)
- Demonym(s): German: Möltner; Italian: di Meltina
- Time zone: UTC+1 (CET)
  - Summer (DST): UTC+2 (CEST)
- Postal code: 39010
- Dialing code: 0471
- Website: Official website

Mölten (German: [ˈmœltn̩]; Italian: Meltina [ˈmɛltina, melˈtiːna]) is a comune (municipality) and a village in South Tyrol in northern Italy, located about 12 kilometres (7 mi) northwest of Bolzano.

== Geography ==
As of 30 November 2010, it had a population of 1,622 and an area of 36.9 square kilometres (14.2 mi^{2}).

The municipality of Mölten contains the frazioni (subdivisions, mainly villages and hamlets) Schlaneid (Salonetto), Verschneid (Frassineto), and Versein (Vallesina).

Mölten borders the following municipalities: Gargazon, Burgstall, Jenesien, Sarntal, Terlan and Vöran.

== History ==
=== Coat-of-arms ===
The emblem is a pot with three feet and an or handle, from which emerge three lilies with vert stems on gules. The sign is based on that of the Hafner family, who lived in the village, which was granted by Archduke Ferdinand of Austria in 1523. The emblem was adopted in 1969.

== Society ==
=== Linguistic distribution ===
According to the 2024 census, 96.60% of the population speak German, 3.34% Italian and 0.06% Ladin as first language.

=== Demographic evolution ===
Historical population

Year	Pop.	±%
1860	?	—
1870	?	—
1880	1,035	—
1900	?	—
1910	939	—

Year	Pop.	±%
1921	964	+2.7%
1931	1,004	+4.1%
1936	1,071	+6.7%
1951	1,149	+7.3%
1961	1,035	−9.9%

Year	Pop.	±%
1971	1,100	+6.3%
1981	1,144	+4.0%
1991	1,214	+6.1%
2001	1,447	+19.2%

Source: Data from ISTAT
