= Department of Alto Adige =

Northern department of the Napoleonic Kingdom of Italy

Dipartimento dell'Alto Adige Ober-Etsch Departement
- Department of Kingdom of Italy (Napoleonic)
- 1810–1814
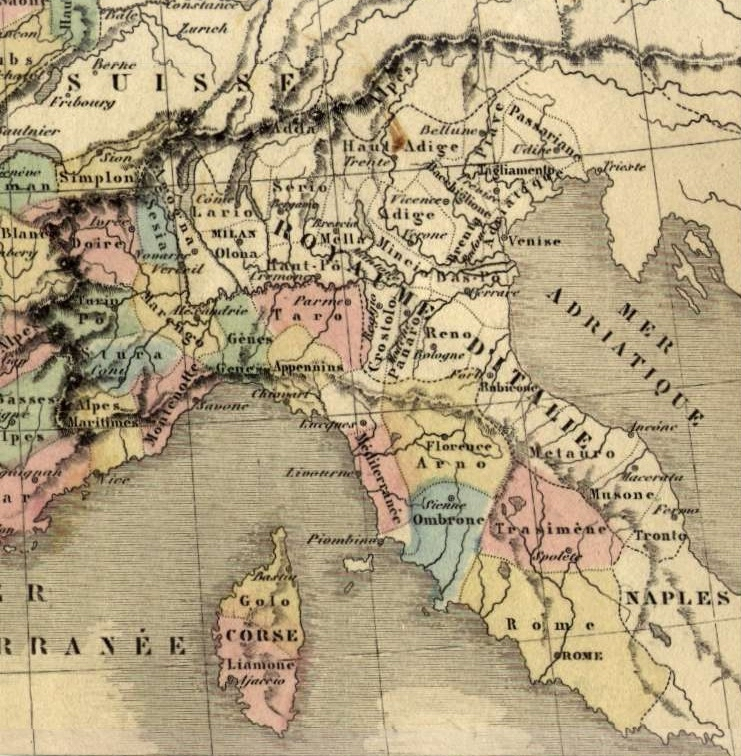
- French map of Napoleonic Italy, with the department of Alto Adige (French: Haut-Adige) located in the north
- Capital: Trento
- History
  - Established: 1810
  - Disestablished: 1814

The Department of Alto Adige (Italian and official Dipartimento dell'Alto Adige, German: Ober-Etsch Departement, French: département du Haut-Adige, translated into English Department of Upper Adige) was a northern department of the Napoleonic Kingdom of Italy. The name had been used for a district of the Cisalpine Republic. Its name, in typical Napoleonic fashion of naming departments after geographic features, derived from the river Adige (Etsch in German) which flowed through it.

Neither the Cisalpine district nor the department of the Kingdom of Italy correspond to the modern Italian province of Alto Adige (known as South Tyrol in English), although there is some geographical overlap.

== History ==
=== Cisalpine Republic ===
Under the Cisalpine Republic a district of Alto Adige (Distretto dell'Alto Adige) was created as a part of the short-lived "Department of Benaco". The District of Alto Adige included some municipalities of today's province of Verona. The Department of Benaco, which was created in 1797, was disbanded in 1798 and with it the District of Alto Adige after a structural reorganization of the Napoleon's Italian republic.

=== Kingdom of Italy ===
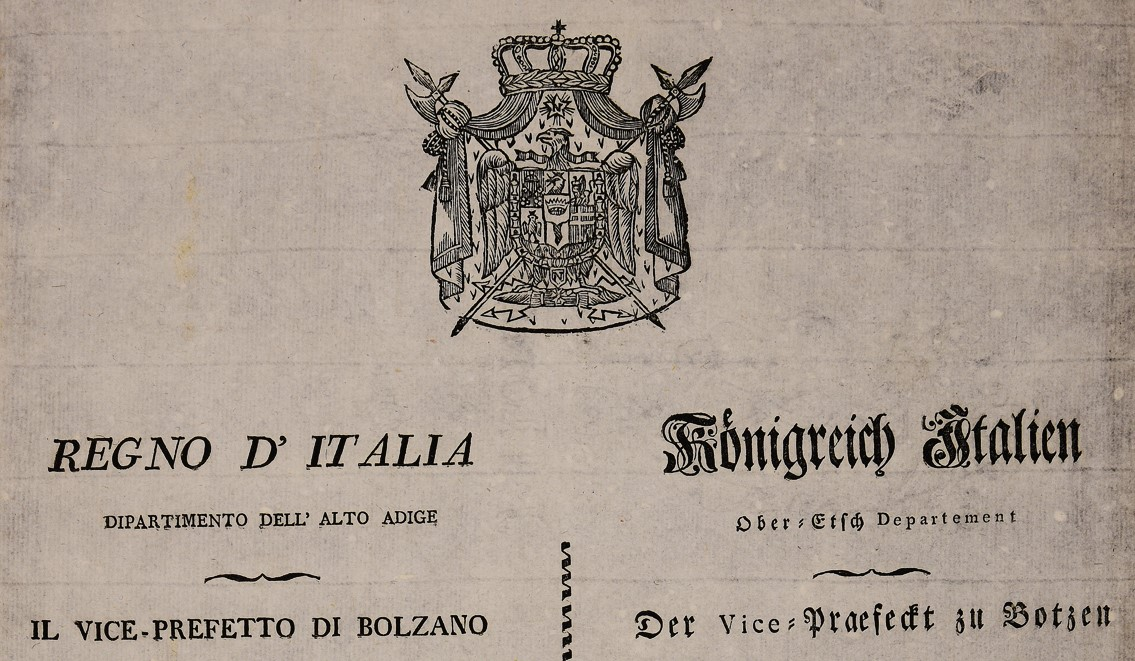
Napoleonic Departement Alto Adige-Oberetsch as of 1810, District of Bolzano-Botzen

After the partition of the County of Tyrol between Bavaria and the Kingdom of Italy on 9 June 1810 by Napoleon Bonaparte, the new department of Alto Adige was created. It comprised the largest part of today's province of Trentino, communes in the provinces of Vicenza and Brescia, and parts of today's province of Alto Adige/South Tyrol (the city of Bolzano, the district of Überetsch-Unterland, some parts of Salten-Schlern and Burggrafenamt).

Its capital was Trent and the administrative language Italian, but the German-speaking areas temporarily adopted bilingualism in the public notices and used German in city government. The department was known in German as "Ober-Etsch".

The department included the area around Bolzano, while the northern parts of today's South Tyrol were left united to Bavaria.

The department was disbanded after the defeat of Napoleon in 1814. Its territory was divided over the actual Italian autonomous provinces of Trento and Bolzano/Bozen (also known as South Tyrol in English or Alto Adige in Italian).

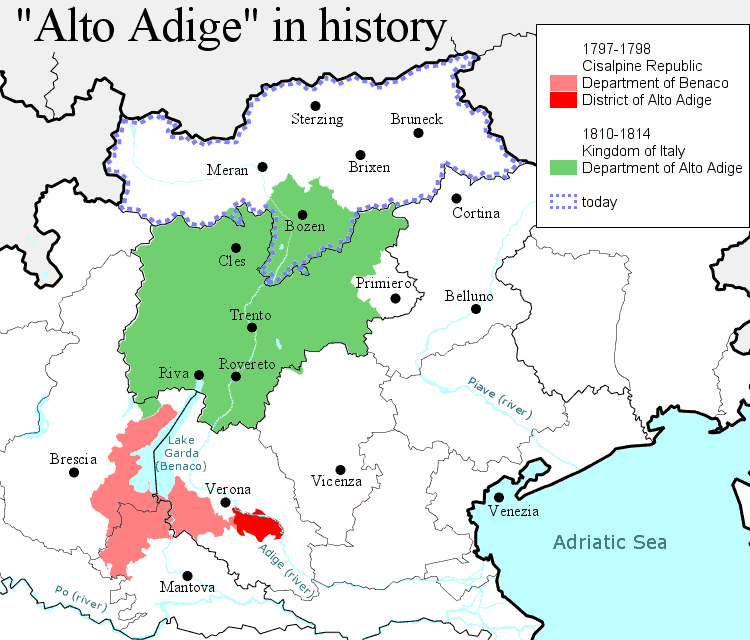

== Reuse of name ==
The name Alto Adige had no historical antecedent about the region it denoted, but merely described the geographic area of the upper reaches of the Adige river. This was something that was commonly done during the Napoleonic period when naming departments, ignoring any historical names or connotations but using geographical references. The name was dropped after the end of the Napoleonic period, but was used by the Italian irredentists in the mid 1800s.

The term "Alto Adige" was later used as the Italian name of the province of Bolzano by the fascist Ettore Tolomei in his Italianization campaign. He used the words "Alto Adige" as a historical connection to the Napoleon's geopolitical transformation of the Italian peninsula. In 1918 what was used to be officially called "southern Tyrol" or "cisalpine Tyrol" was united after the end of World War I to Italy; the term "Alto Adige" was applied and made official by the Kingdom of Italy in 1920.

== See also ==
- Bolzano
- Kingdom of Italy (1805-1814)
- Alto Adige (District)
- South Tyrol
