= Burgstall, South Tyrol =

Burgstall
- Comune
- Gemeinde Burgstall; Comune di Postal
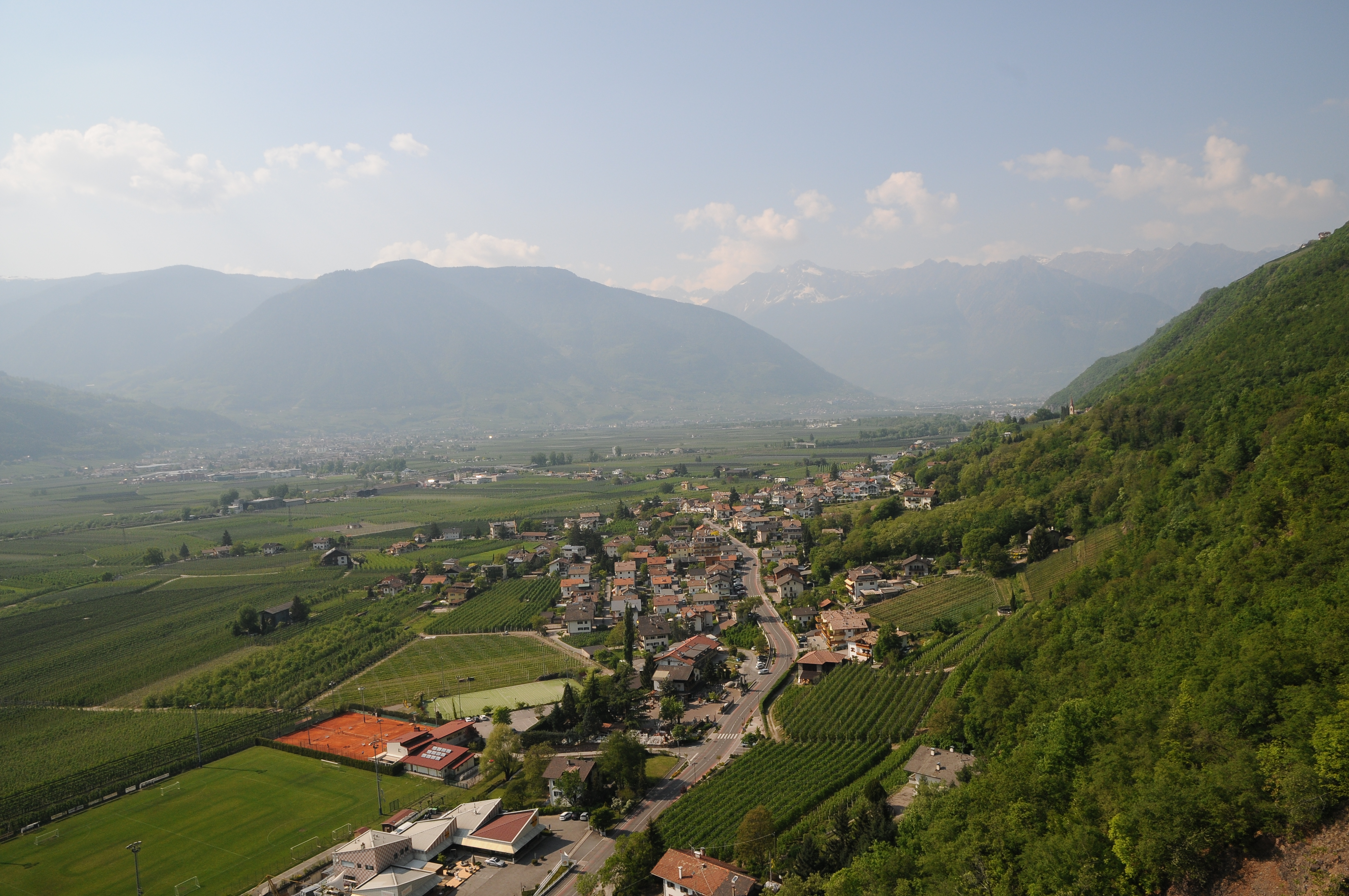
- View of Burgstall

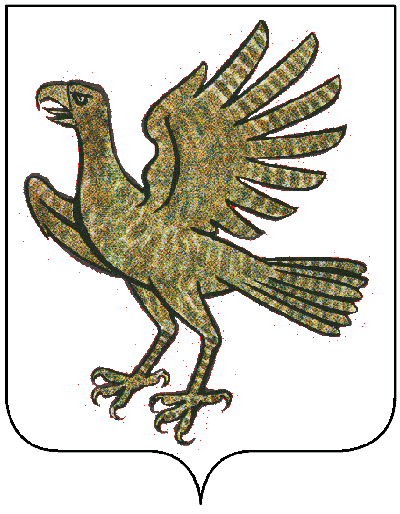
- Coat of arms

- Location within Italy Location within Trentino-Alto Adige/Südtirol
- Coordinates: 46°36′N 11°12′E
- Country: Italy
- Region: Trentino-Alto Adige/Südtirol
- Province: South Tyrol (BZ)

Government
  - Mayor: Othmar Unterkofler

Area
  - Total: 6.7 km^{2} (2.6 sq mi)

Population (31-12-2025)
  - Total: 2,044
  - Density: 310/km^{2} (790/sq mi)
- Demonym(s): German: Burgstaller; Italian: di Postal
- Time zone: UTC+1 (CET)
  - Summer (DST): UTC+2 (CEST)
- Postal code: 39014
- Dialing code: 0473
- Website: Official website

Burgstall (German pronunciation: [ˈbʊrkʃtal]; Italian: Postal [poˈstal]) is a comune (municipality) and a village in South Tyrol in northern Italy.

== Geography ==
Burgstall is located in the Burggrafenamt. The municipality extends on the orographically left, eastern side of the valley and has a size of 6.7 square kilometres (2.6 mi^{2}), with about half of the land being agricultural green or forest. The village center is situated at about 270 m, slightly elevated above the valley floor. To the east, the municipal area rises up to 1000 m on the slopes of the Tschögglberg mountain; to the west, it ends at the Adige river.

Burgstall borders the following municipalities: Gargazon, Lana, Merano, Mölten, and Vöran.

== History ==
=== Coat-of-arms ===
The emblem shows a eurasian sparrowhawk, which is to fly up, on argent. It is the arms of the Knights of Burgstall, the emblem was granted in 1966.

== Society ==
=== Linguistic distribution ===
According to the 2024 census, 76.84% of the population speak German, 22.71% Italian and 0.45% Ladin as first language.

Language	2001	2011	2024
German	73.99%	76.61%	76.84%
Italian	25.64%	22.78%	22.71%
Ladin	0.37%	0.61%	0.45%

=== Demographic evolution ===
Historical population

Year	Pop.	±%
1860	?	—
1870	?	—
1880	585	—
1900	?	—
1910	591	—

Year	Pop.	±%
1921	590	−0.2%
1931	861	+45.9%
1936	948	+10.1%
1951	1,006	+6.1%
1961	1,032	+2.6%

Year	Pop.	±%
1971	1,158	+12.2%
1981	1,164	+0.5%
1991	1,268	+8.9%
2001	1,435	+13.2%

Source: Data from ISTAT
