= Gargazon =

- Comune
- Gemeinde Gargazon; Comune di Gargazzone
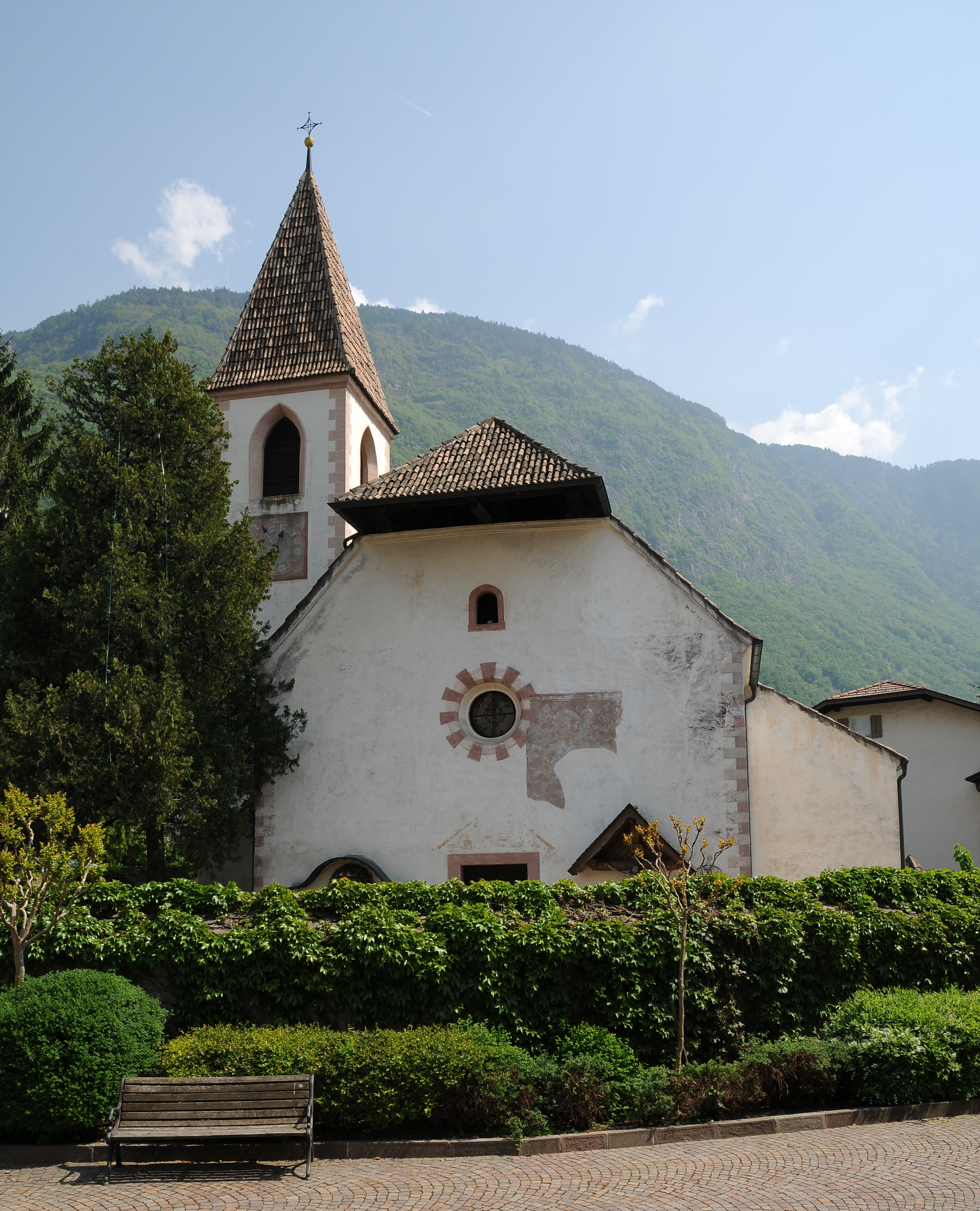
- Saint John the Baptist Church

- Location within Italy Location within Trentino-Alto Adige/Südtirol
- Coordinates: 46°35′N 11°12′E
- Country: Italy
- Region: Trentino-Alto Adige/Südtirol
- Province: South Tyrol (BZ)

Government
  - Mayor: Bernhard Paris

Area
  - Total: 4.9 km^{2} (1.9 sq mi)

Population (Nov. 2010)
  - Total: 1,639
  - Density: 330/km^{2} (870/sq mi)
- Demonym(s): German:Gargazoner; Italian: gargazzonesi
- Time zone: UTC+1 (CET)
  - Summer (DST): UTC+2 (CEST)
- Postal code: 39010
- Dialing code: 0473
- Website: Official website

Gargazon (German: [ˈɡarɡatsoːn]; Italian: Gargazzone [ɡarɡatˈtsoːne]) is a comune (municipality) and a village in South Tyrol in northern Italy, located about 15 kilometres (9 mi) northwest of Bolzano.

== Geography ==
As of 30 November 2010, it had a population of 1,639 and an area of 4.9 square kilometres (1.9 mi^{2}).

Gargazon borders the following municipalities: Lana, Mölten, Nals, Burgstall, Terlan and Tisens.

== History ==
=== Coat-of-arms ===
The emblem represents an argent tower on a gules hill with three fruit trees. The tower is the Kröllturm built in 1240 by Bartold von Trauston. The emblem was adopted in 1968.

== Society ==
=== Linguistic distribution ===
According to the 2024 census, 80.51% of the population speak German, 18.41% Italian and 1.08% Ladin as first language.

Language	2001	2011	2024
German	78.22%	78.68%	80.51%
Italian	21.32%	20.33%	18.41%
Ladin	0.46%	0.99%	1.08%

== Demographic evolution ==
Historical population

Year	Pop.	±%
1860	?	—
1870	?	—
1880	574	—
1900	?	—
1910	368	—

Year	Pop.	±%
1921	441	+19.8%
1931	558	+26.5%
1936	643	+15.2%
1951	705	+9.6%
1961	817	+15.9%

Year	Pop.	±%
1971	943	+15.4%
1981	1,038	+10.1%
1991	1,140	+9.8%
2001	1,366	+19.8%

Source: Data from ISTAT

== Panorama ==
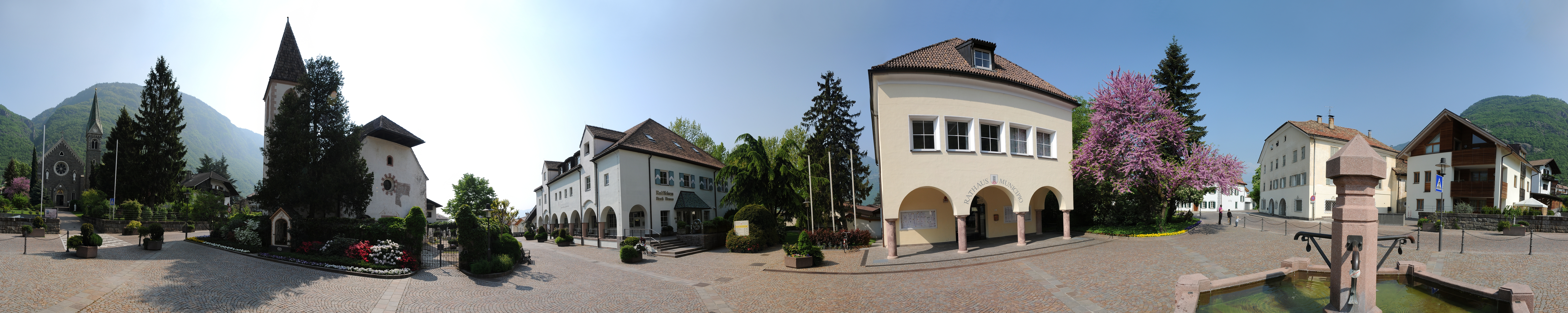
360° panorama of the center of Gargazon
