= Madonna di Campiglio =

Village and skiing resort in Italy

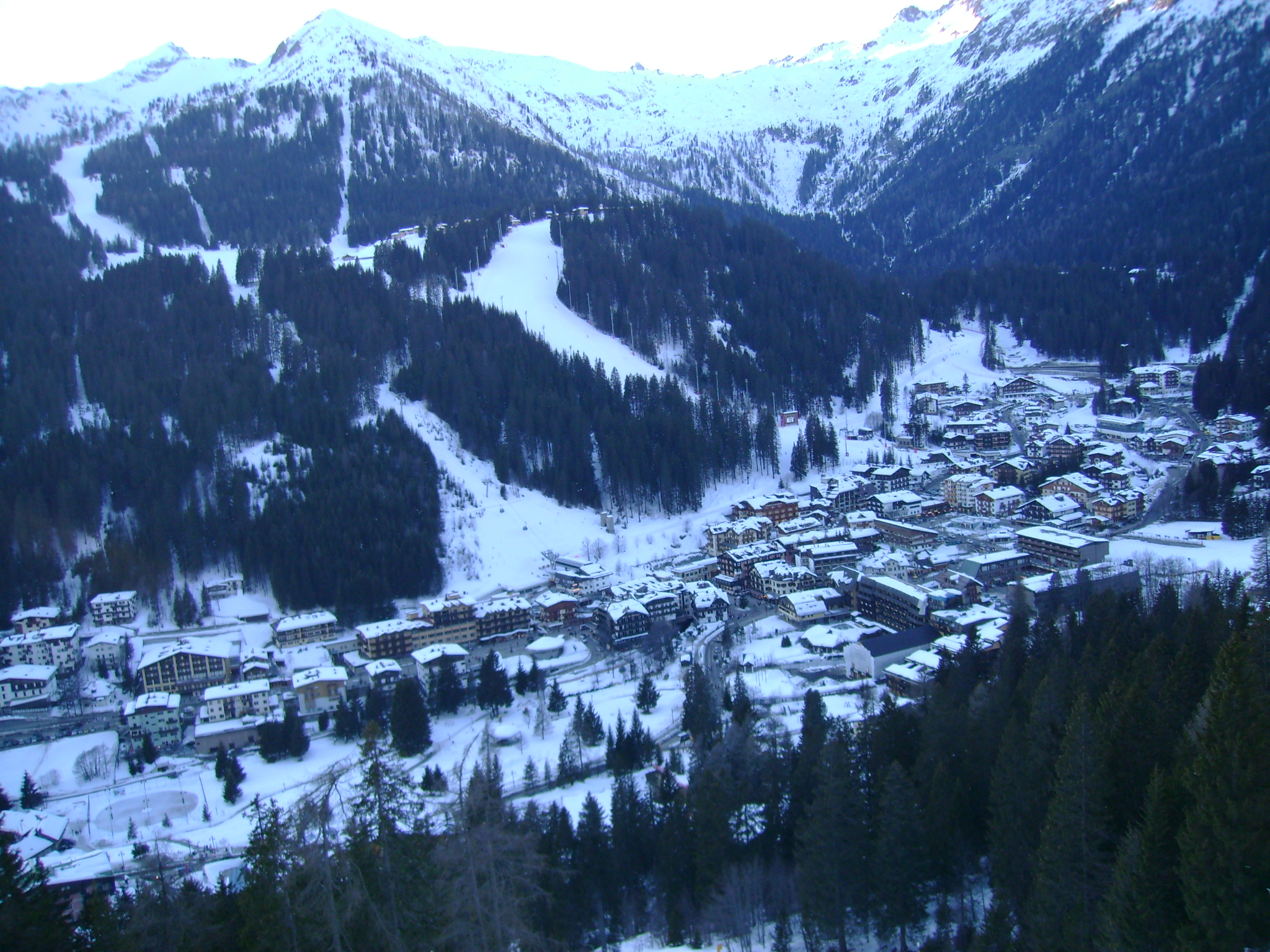
- Madonna di Campiglio

- Location within Italy Location within Alps Location within Europe
- Location: Trentino, Italy
- Coordinates: 46°13′55″N 10°49′34″E
- Vertical: 1,000 m (3,281 ft)
- Top elevation: 2,600 m (8,530 ft)
- Base elevation: 1,522 m (4,993 ft)
- Lift capacity: 31,000 skiers/hr
- Website: campiglio.com

Madonna di Campiglio (German: Sankt Maria im Pein) is a village and a ski resort in northeast Italy. It is also a frazione of the comune of Pinzolo. The village lies in the Val Rendena at an elevation of 1,522 m (4,993 ft) above sea level, with an approximate population of 1,000.

The ski area around Madonna di Campiglio has 57 lifts and 150 km (93 mi) of ski runs, with a capacity of more than 31,000 per hour. It rises to an elevation of 2,600 m (8,530 ft), has 50,000 m^{2} (12 acres) of snow park, 40 km (25 mi) for Nordic skiing and links to the pistes in Pinzolo, Folgarida, and Marilleva. Combined, they have 156 kilometres (97 mi) of interconnected runs.

Madonna di Campiglio is the main point of access to the Brenta Dolomites, with its famous via ferrata, with the ski lift to the Passo Groste (or de:Passo del Grostè) taking one directly to the northern end of the via ferrata network.

== Ski resorts in the Italian Alps ==
Following World War II the Italian government planned and developed ski resorts. Madonna di Campiglio is still among Italy’s most fashionable ski resorts. Italian fashion can be seen on both the pistes and the streets.

The ski resort has a historic association with Fiat and Ferrari. Ski enthusiasts appreciate dramatic scenery and very steep pistes. The ski resort has three signature tree lined pistes, the Amazzonia, the Schumacher Streif and the Canalone Miramonti. Hotel Alpen Vidi is adjacent to the Canalone Miramonti piste. The nearby ski resort Passo Tonale can only be accessed with a Superskirama ski pass.

== Festivals and events ==
The village regularly hosts World Cup alpine skiing and snowboarding races. Scuderia Ferrari Formula One and Ducati Corse MotoGP teams hold a media event in January at the resort. In summer the village hosts the Rally Stella Alpina, an Italian classic race. In cycling, the village has been the location for the finish of stages of the Giro d'Italia twice: in 1999 Marco Pantani won the stage whilst wearing the pink jersey, before being disqualified from the race after a blood test revealed a high haematocrit level, whilst in 2015 the stage was won by Mikel Landa.

On 17 December 1974, Swedish alpine ski racer Ingemar Stenmark won his first Wprld Cup competition here.

On 8 January 2025, Albert Popov made a remarkable comeback in the second run, securing his first World Cup race victory in the classic 3-Tre night slalom at Madonna di Campiglio.
