= Montiggler Seen =

Two lakes in South Tyrol, Italy

Großer Montiggler See
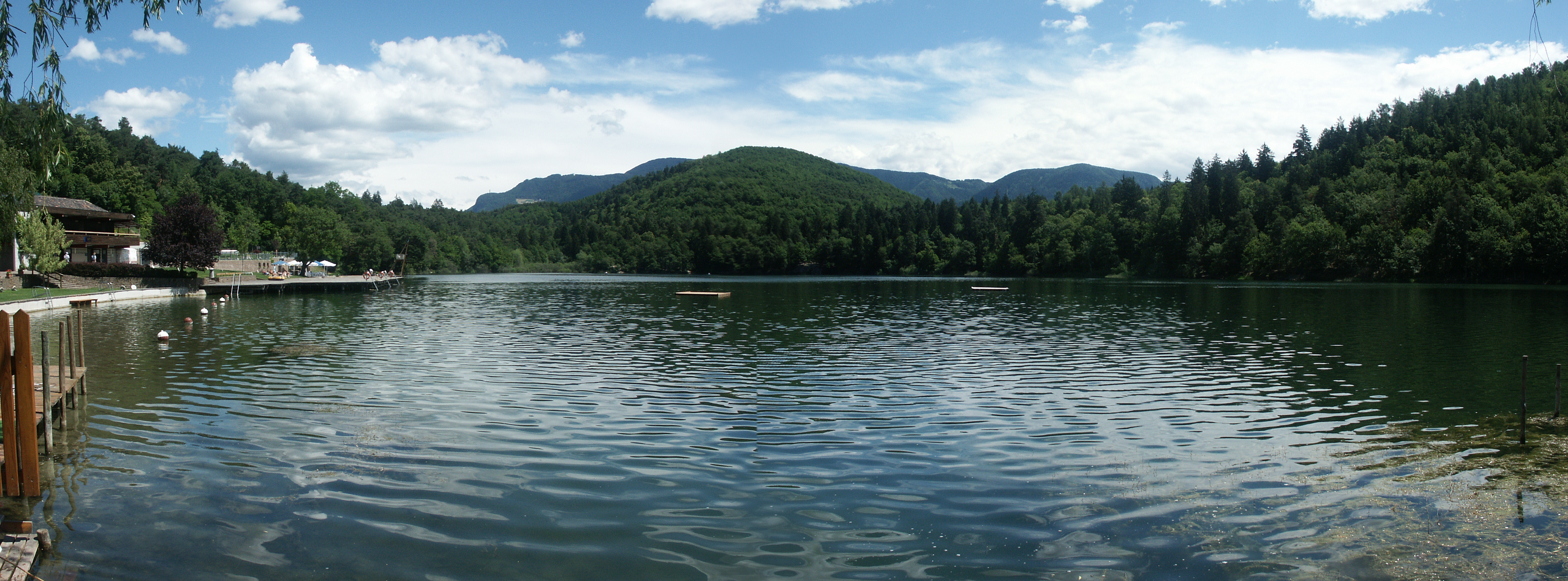
- Großer Montiggler See, the bigger one of the pair

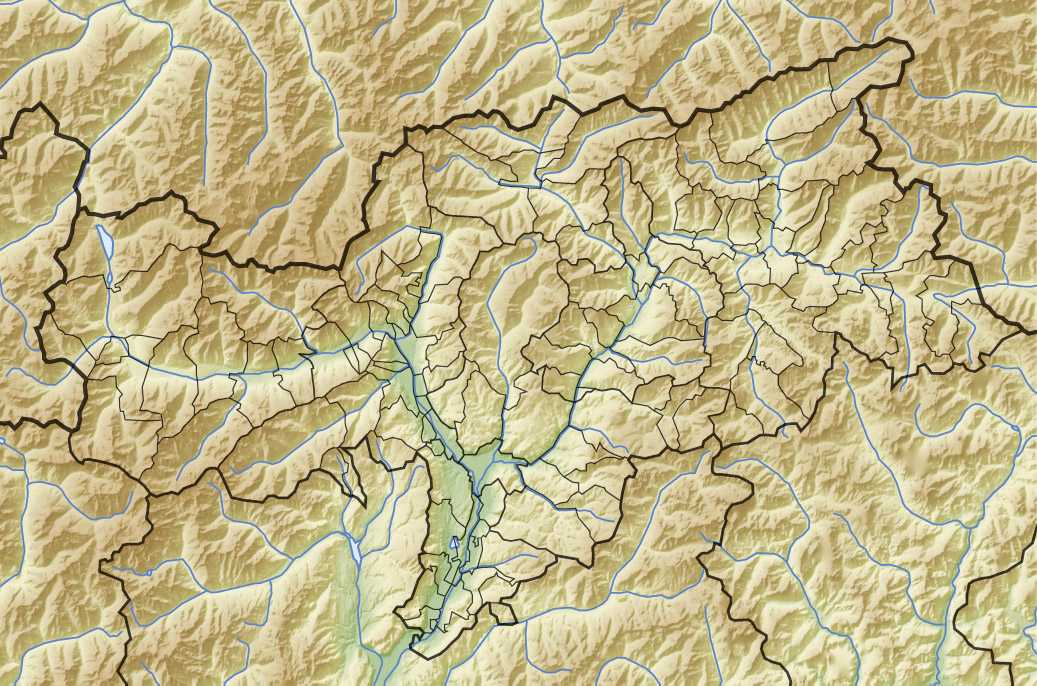
- Location within South Tyrol
- Location: South Tyrol
- Coordinates: 46°25′23″N 11°17′24″E
- Catchment area: 2,274 km^{2} (878 sq mi)
- Basin countries: Italy
- Surface area: 17.8 ha (44 acres)
- Average depth: 8.4 m (28 ft)
- Max. depth: 11.5 m (38 ft)
- Water volume: 1,490,000 m^{3} (0.00036 cu mi)
- Surface elevation: 492 m (1,614 ft)
- Settlements: Eppan

The Montiggler Seen are two lakes in the municipality of Eppan in South Tyrol, Italy.
