= Überetsch-Unterland =

Coordinates: 46.4°N 11.3°E

- District
- Comunità comprensoriale Oltradige-Bassa Atesina; Bezirksgemeinschaft Überetsch-Unterland
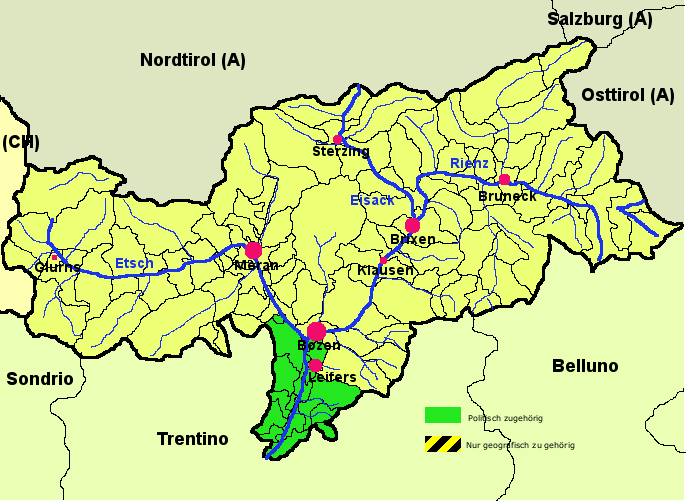
- Überetsch-Unterland district (highlighted in green) within South Tyrol
- Country: Italy
- Autonomous region: Trentino-Alto Adige
- Autonomous province: South Tyrol
- Administrative seat: Neumarkt (Egna)

Area
  - Total: 424 km^{2} (164 sq mi)

Population (2010)
  - Total: 72,144
  - Density: 170/km^{2} (441/sq mi)
- Website: www.bzgcc.bz.it

Überetsch-Unterland (Italian: Oltradige-Bassa Atesina [olˈtraːdidʒe bass ateˈziːna]; German: Überetsch-Unterland) is a district (Italian: comprensorio; German: Bezirksgemeinschaft) in the southern part of the Italian province of South Tyrol. It comprises the valley of the Adige river from Bolzano in the north to Salorno in the south.

== Overview ==
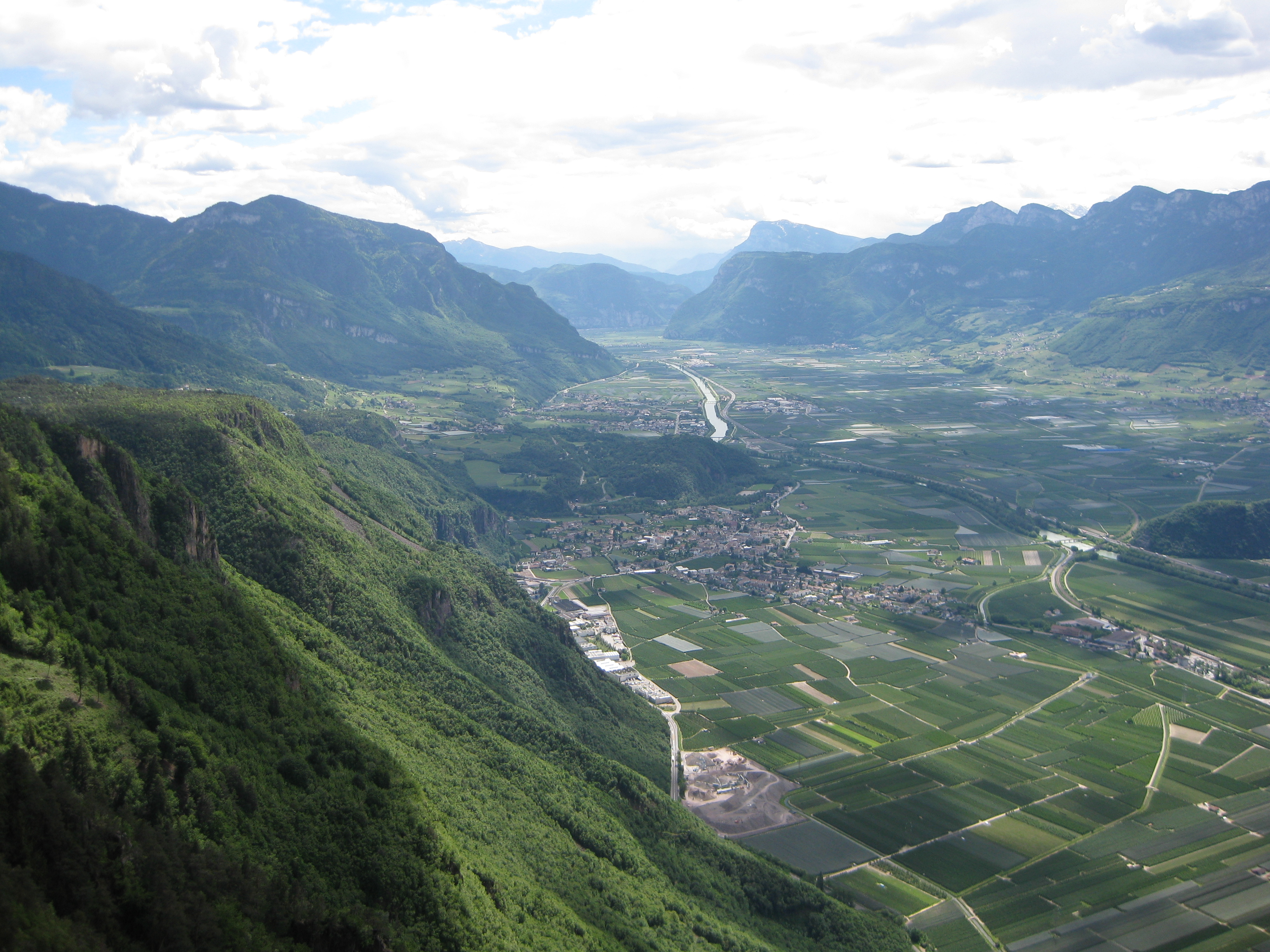
View over Unterland with Neumarkt and Salorno

The hilly Überetsch region, i.e. the municipal areas of Eppan and Kaltern, forms the northwestern part of the district, while the larger Unterland stretches down the Adige to the border with the Trentino province. The district also comprises the municipalities of Andrian and Terlan north of Überetsch. During the premodern period, the whole area was, ecclesiastically speaking, part of the diocese of Trent forming its so-called Deutscher Anteil due to the predominantly German-speaking population.

Main economic factors are viticulture along the South Tyrolean Wine Route from Terlan to Salorno, fruit growing and tourism.

According to the 2011 census, 64% of the population of the valley speak German, 35.5% Italian and 0.5% Ladin as mother language.

== Subdivision ==
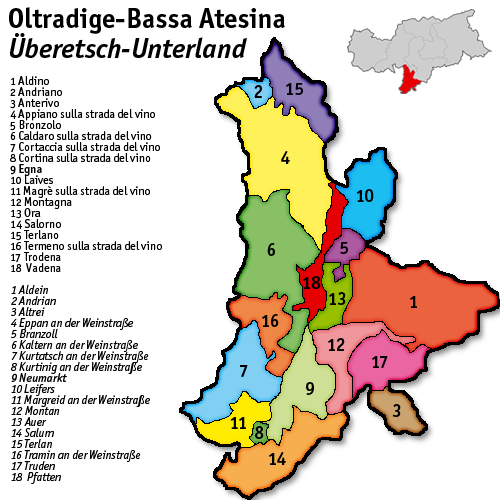
Municipalities of Überetsch-Unterland

The following 18 municipalities are part of the district Überetsch-Unterland:

- Aldein
- Altrei
- Andrian
- Auer
- Bronzolo
- Eppan
- Kaltern
- Kurtatsch
- Kurtinig
- Laives
- Margreid
- Montan
- Neumarkt (district capital)
- Salorno
- Terlan
- Tramin
- Truden
- Vadena
