= Andrian, South Tyrol =

Andrian
- Comune
- Gemeinde Andrian; Comune di Adriano
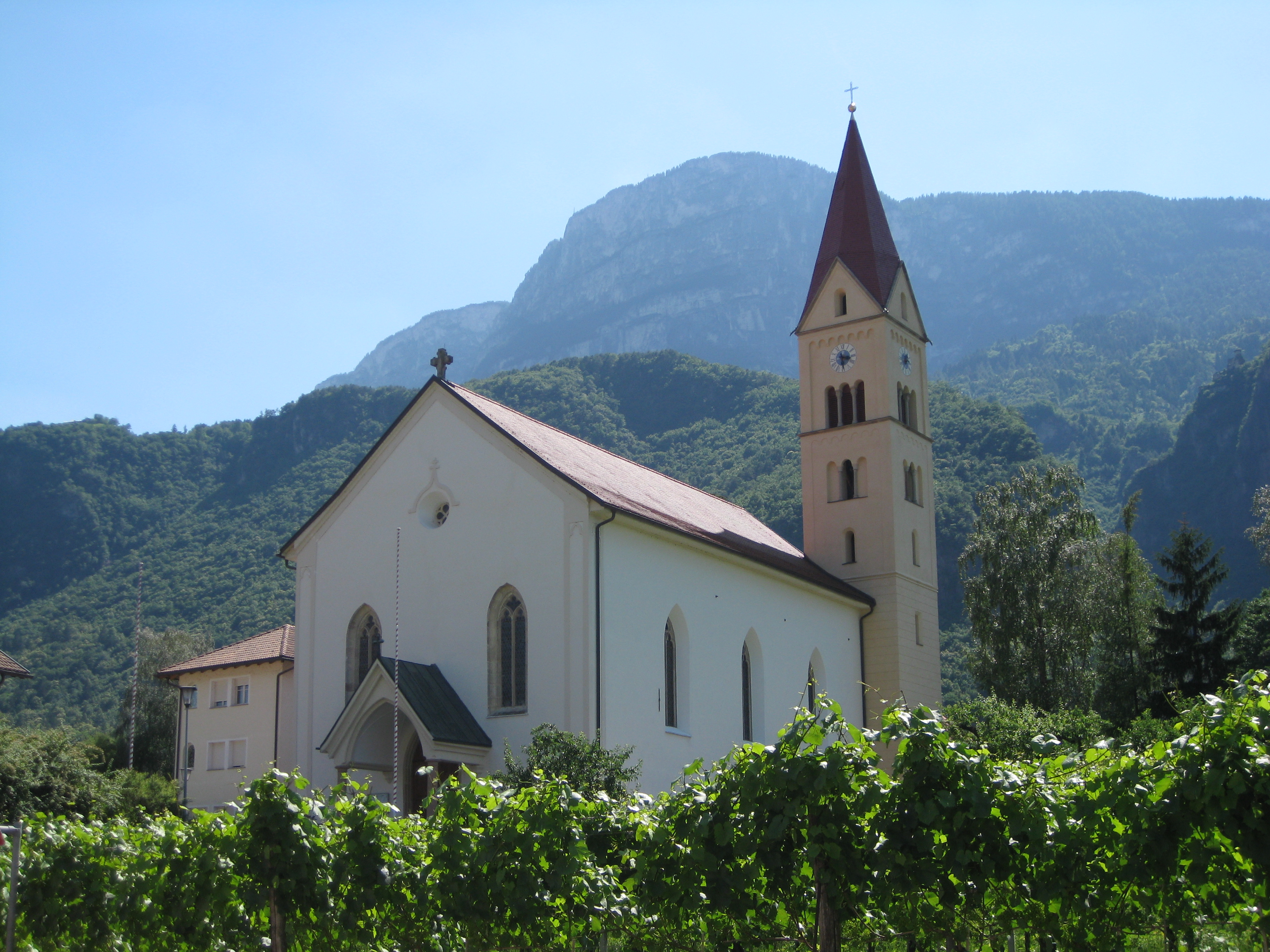
- Church of Saint Valentine

- Coat of arms

- Location within Italy Location within Trentino-Alto Adige/Südtirol
- Coordinates: 46°31′N 11°14′E
- Country: Italy
- Region: Trentino-Alto Adige/Südtirol
- Province: South Tyrol (BZ)

Government
  - Mayor: Georg Profanter (SVP)

Area
  - Total: 4.9 km^{2} (1.9 sq mi)
- Elevation: 285 m (935 ft)

Population (Nov. 2010)
  - Total: 1,043
  - Density: 210/km^{2} (550/sq mi)
- Demonyms: German: Andrianer; Italian: andrianesi
- Time zone: UTC+1 (CET)
  - Summer (DST): UTC+2 (CEST)
- Postal code: 39010
- Dialing code: 0471
- Website: Official website

Andrian (German pronunciation: [ˈandrɪan]; Italian: Andriano [andriˈaːno]) is a comune (municipality) and a village in South Tyrol in Italy, located about 9 kilometres (6 mi) north-west of the city of Bolzano.

== Geography ==
As of 30 November 2010, it had a population of 1,043 and an area of 4.9 square kilometres (1.9 mi^{2}).

Andrian borders the following municipalities: Eppan, Nals and Terlan.

== History ==
=== Coat of arms ===
The emblem is that of the Lords of Andrian. It's party per pale of gules and argent with a pile curved inward and the colours alternating. The emblem was adopted in 1968.

== Society ==
=== Linguistic distribution ===
According to the 2024 census, 90.54% speak German, 8.58% Italian and 0.88% Ladin as first language.

Language	1991	2001	2011	2024
German	95.01%	97.32%	89.96%	90.54%
Italian	4.57%	2.55%	9.53%	8.58%
Ladin	0.42%	0.13%	0.51%	0.88%

=== Demographic evolution ===
Historical population

Year	Pop.	±%
1860	?	—
1870	?	—
1880	320	—
1900	?	—
1910	381	—

Year	Pop.	±%
1921	440	+15.5%
1931	454	+3.2%
1936	480	+5.7%
1951	505	+5.2%
1961	495	−2.0%

Year	Pop.	±%
1971	602	+21.6%
1981	644	+7.0%
1991	758	+17.7%
2001	794	+4.7%

Source: Data from ISTAT
