= Alto Adige (district) =

District in the "Department of Benaco" in the Napoleon's Cisalpine Republic (1797–1798)

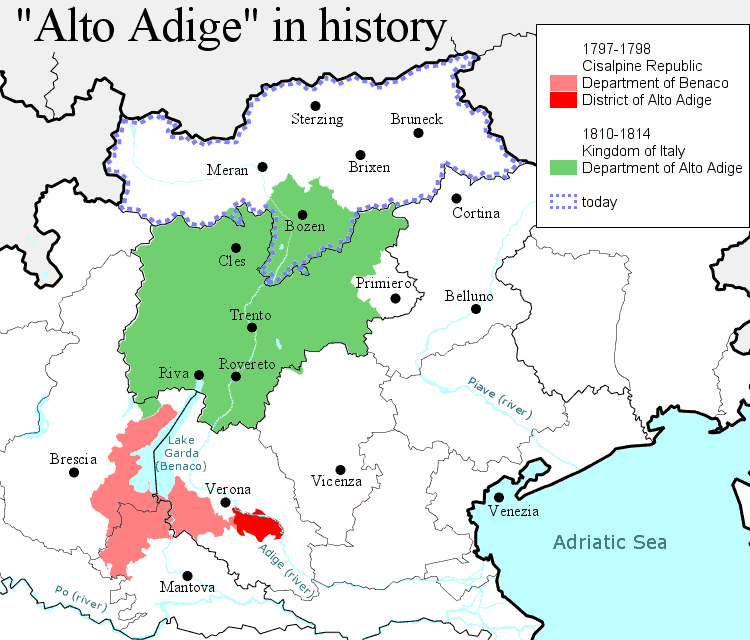

Alto Adige (literally Upper Adige) was a district in the "Department of Benaco" in the Napoleon's Cisalpine Republic (1797–1798).

== History ==
Under the Cisalpine Republic a District of Alto Adige (called in Italian: Distretto dell'Alto Adige) was created as a part of the short-lived "Department of Benaco". The District of Alto Adige included some municipalities of today's province of Verona.

The "Department of Benaco", which was created in 1797 and included some territories of actual Province of Trento and Province of Verona, was disbanded in 1798 and with it the District of Alto Adige after a structural reorganization of the Napoleon's first Italian republic.

The name Alto Adige was reused in 1810 by the Napoleonic Kingdom of Italy for the short lived Department of Alto Adige with Trento as its administrative capital.

== Bibliography ==
- Reinhard Stauber. Der Zentralstaat an seinen Grenzen. Administrative Integration, Herrschaftswechsel und politische Kultur im südlichen Alpenraum 1750–1820 (Schriftenreihe der Historischen Kommission der Bayerischen Akademie der Wissenschaften, 64), Göttingen, Vandenhoeck & Ruprecht, 2001. ISBN 978-3-525-36057-6

== See also ==
- Department of Alto Adige
- Cisalpine Republic
