= Mendel Pass =

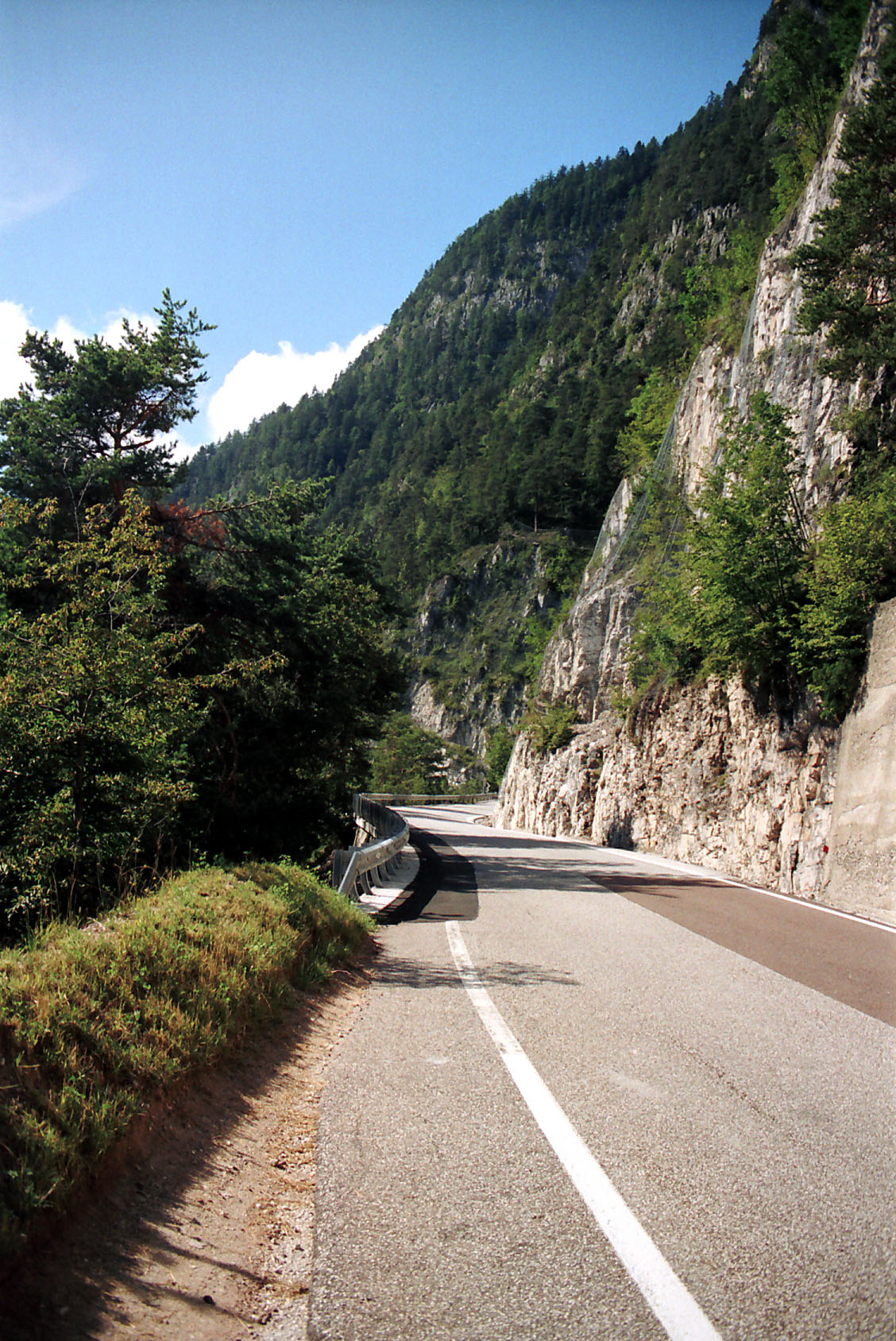
- Pass road
- Interactive map of Mendel Pass
- Elevation: 1,362 metres (4,469 ft)
- Traversed by: SS 42

Third Approach
- Location: Trentino/South Tyrol, Italy
- Coordinates: 46°25′1″N 11°12′26″E

The Mendel Pass (German: Mendelpass or Mendel, Italian: Passo della Mendola, Passo Mendola or Mendola [ˈmendola]) is a 1,362 metre-high mountain pass in the Nonsberg Group of the Southern Rhaetian Alps between the provinces of Trentino and South Tyrol in Italy.

== Infrastructure ==
The pass is accessed by the pass road, which begins in the town of Fondo in the Non Valley and ends southwest of the city of Bolzano, and the Mendel Funicular, which connects the Überetsch plateau with the pass. The pass road, SS 42, has a maximum grade of 12%, but is relatively straight. It is open year-round, but trailers are prohibited.

== History ==
The pass road was built between 1880 and 1885, and the first hotel at the pass was built in 1890. In 1900, a tram was built from the town of Kaltern.

== Associated risks ==
The instability of the cliffs overhanging the road is a cause of concern, and work was undertaken in 2005 to stabilize them. The pass is under constant observation, particularly in the spring, when thawing and refreezing causes danger of slides.

== Climate ==
Climate data for Mendel Pass, elevation 1,320 m (4,330 ft), (1971–2000)
Month	Jan	Feb	Mar	Apr	May	Jun	Jul	Aug	Sep	Oct	Nov	Dec	Year
Mean daily maximum °C (°F)	3.4 (38.1)	4.4 (39.9)	7.1 (44.8)	10.0 (50.0)	15.1 (59.2)	19.0 (66.2)	21.9 (71.4)	21.5 (70.7)	17.6 (63.7)	12.6 (54.7)	6.7 (44.1)	3.5 (38.3)	11.9 (53.4)
Daily mean °C (°F)	−1.1 (30.0)	−0.5 (31.1)	2.1 (35.8)	4.9 (40.8)	9.7 (49.5)	13.2 (55.8)	16.0 (60.8)	15.7 (60.3)	12.2 (54.0)	7.7 (45.9)	2.3 (36.1)	−0.6 (30.9)	6.8 (44.3)
Mean daily minimum °C (°F)	−5.6 (21.9)	−5.3 (22.5)	−2.8 (27.0)	−0.1 (31.8)	4.3 (39.7)	7.5 (45.5)	10.0 (50.0)	10.0 (50.0)	6.7 (44.1)	2.8 (37.0)	−2.1 (28.2)	−4.7 (23.5)	1.7 (35.1)
Average precipitation mm (inches)	39 (1.5)	33 (1.3)	54 (2.1)	78 (3.1)	110 (4.3)	105 (4.1)	105 (4.1)	101 (4.0)	88 (3.5)	104 (4.1)	56 (2.2)	37 (1.5)	910 (35.8)
Source: Istituto Superiore per la Protezione e la Ricerca Ambientale

== See also ==
- List of highest paved roads in Europe
- List of mountain passes
