= Überetsch =

Mountain in Italy

Coordinates: 46.07°N 11.25°E

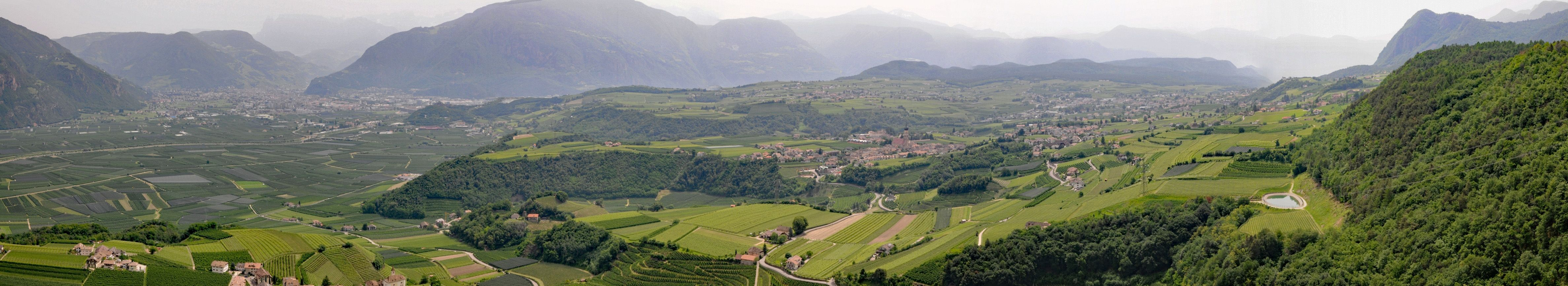
The Überetsch at Eppan as seen from Boymont Castle.

The Überetsch (German: Überetsch; Italian: Oltradige) is a hilly section of the Etschtal in South Tyrol, northern Italy. It lies south-west of Bolzano and is a known tourist destination, famous for its wines, castles and lakes (Kalterer See, Montiggler Seen). The municipalities of the Überetsch are Kaltern and Eppan.

== See also ==
- Überetsch-Unterland
- South Tyrolean Unterland
- Überetsch Railway
