= Merano derailment =

2010 railway accident in Italy

Coordinates: 46°37′25.84″N 10°52′33.88″E

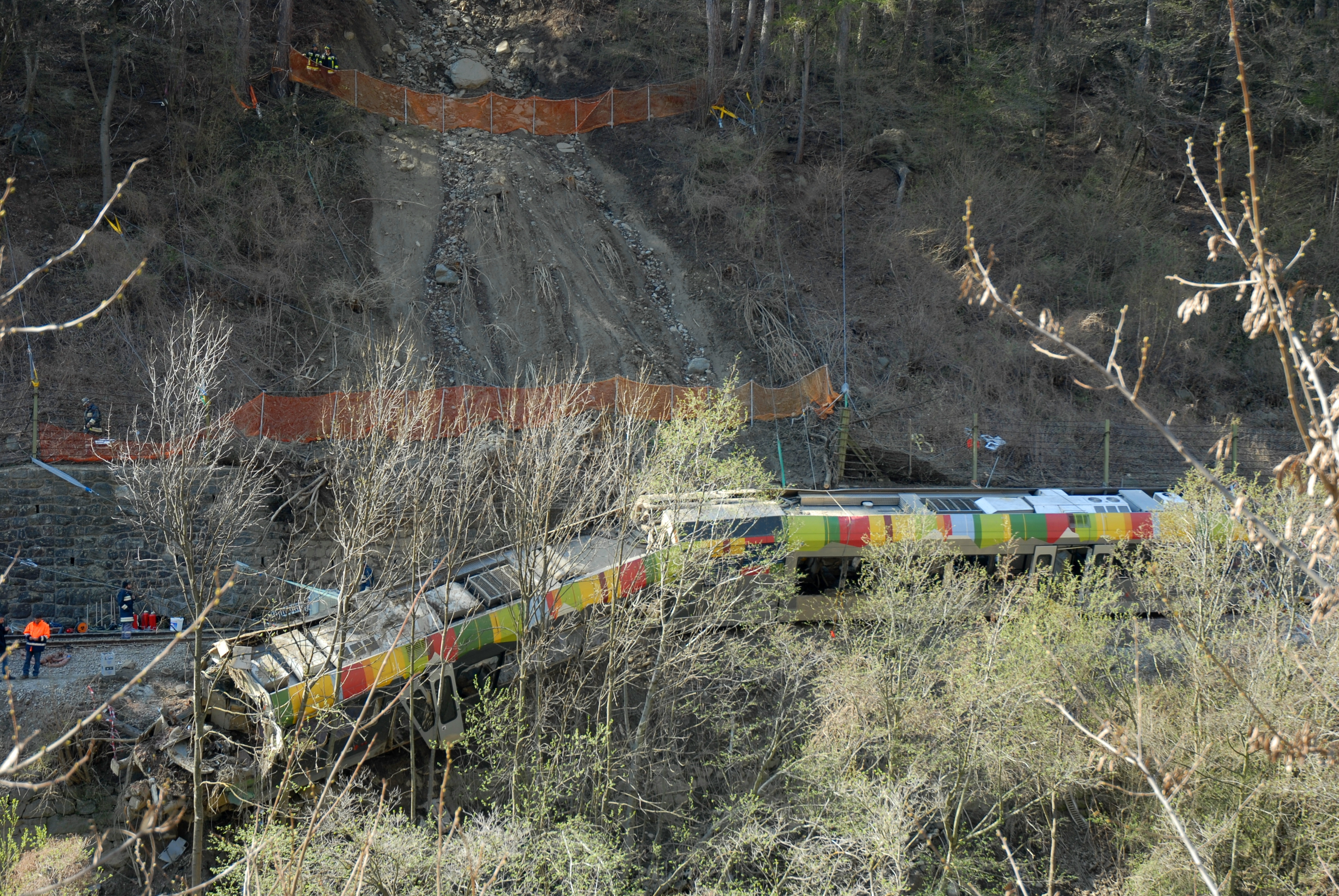
- The derailed train

Details
- Date: 12 April 2010; 9:03 CEST (7:03 UTC)
- Location: Between Latsch and Kastelbell-Tschars (South Tyrol)
- Country: Italy
- Line: Vinschgau Line
- Operator: STA Südtiroler Transportstrukturen AG
- Incident type: Derailment
- Cause: Obstruction on line (landslide)

Statistics
- Trains: 1
- Deaths: 9
- Injured: 28

The Merano derailment occurred on 12 April 2010 when a train derailed between Latsch and Kastelbell, near Merano, Italy, after running into a landslide, causing nine deaths and injuring 28 people.

== Accident ==
At 9:03 local time (7:03 UTC), a two passenger coach Stadler GTW train, operated by STA Südtiroler, derailed in Kastelbell-Tschars after running into a landslide. Nine people died when the train derailed, and 28 others were injured, seven seriously.

The landslide which reportedly derailed the train is believed to have been caused by a burst irrigation pipe, or by a valve inadvertently left open. The train was on a regional service, travelling between Mals and Merano, on the Vinschgau line, which reopened in 2005.

Italy's ANSA news agency said one of the train's three carriages was filled with mud from the landslide, and rescuers dug frantically with shovels and pickaxes to try to reach the victims. A reporter for Sky Italia television said smoke was rising from the wreckage and helicopters were flying overhead.

The railway is equipped with advanced sensors to stop trains in case of landslides, but they could not operate because the mud fell at the moment that the train was passing.

An investigation was underway into why the irrigation pipe burst.

The local aqueduct consortium denies the possibility that the landslide was caused by the pipe, as it is a small pipe (65 mm diameter), and was working perfectly until about 8:00 CEST.

== Victims ==
- Michaela Kuenz Oberhofer, 18, born in 1992 in Martello
- Judith Tappeiner, 20, born in 1990 in Schlanders
- Elisabeth Peer, 22, born in 1988 in Schlanders, a resident of Mals
- Julian Hartmann, 25, train driver, born in 1985 in Merano
- Michaela Zöschg, 34, born in 1976 in Prad am Stilfser Joch
- Rosina Offner, 36, born in 1974 in Schlanders, resident of Taufers im Münstertal
- Francesco Rieger, 67, born in 1943 in Kastelbell-Tschars
- Regina Tschöll, 73, born in 1937 in Laas
- Franz Hohenegger, 73, born in 1937 in Schlanders
