= Vinschgau =

Vinschgau Vnuost (Romansh) Val Venuesta (Ladin) Val Venosta (Italian) Vintschgau
- District
- Comunità comprensoriale Val Venosta; Bezirksgemeinschaft Vinschgau
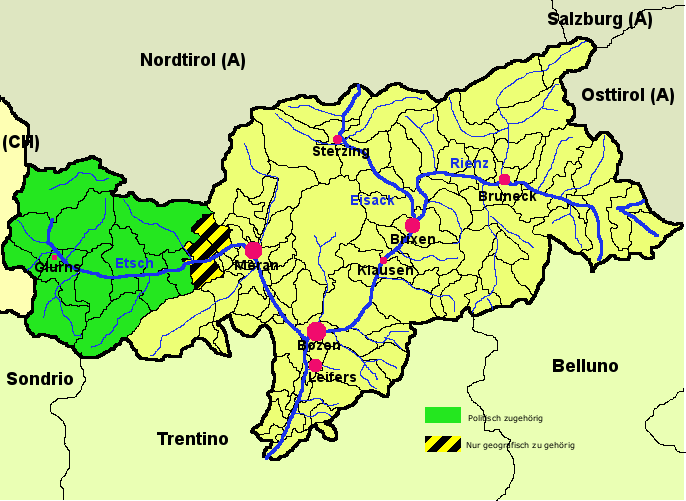
- Vinschgau district (highlighted in green) within South Tyrol; the yellow-black stripes mark the geographical extent of the valley
- Coordinates: 46.615°N 10.705°E
- Country: Italy
- Autonomous region: Trentino-Alto Adige
- Autonomous province: South Tyrol
- Established: 1962
- Administrative seat: Schlanders (Silandro)

Area
  - Total: 1,442 km^{2} (557 sq mi)

Population (2005)
  - Total: 35,043
  - Density: 24.30/km^{2} (62.94/sq mi)
- Website: www.bzgvin.it

The Vinschgau, Vintschgau (German: [ˈfɪn(t)ʃɡaʊ]) or Vinschgau Valley (Italian: Val Venosta [ˈval veˈnɔsta]; Romansh: Vnuost [ˈfnuɔ̯ʃt]; Ladin: Val Venuesta; medieval toponym: Finsgowe) is the upper part of the Adige or Etsch river valley, in the western part of the province of South Tyrol, Italy.

== Etymology ==
The German name Vinschgau, like Italian Val Venosta, is derived from the Celtic (Rhaetian) Venostes tribes mentioned on the ancient Tropaeum Alpium. A Frankish Gau was established under Charlemagne in 772; it was first mentioned in a 1077 deed, when King Henry IV of Germany granted the estates of Schlanders in pago Finsgowe to Bishop Altwin of Brixen.

== Geography ==
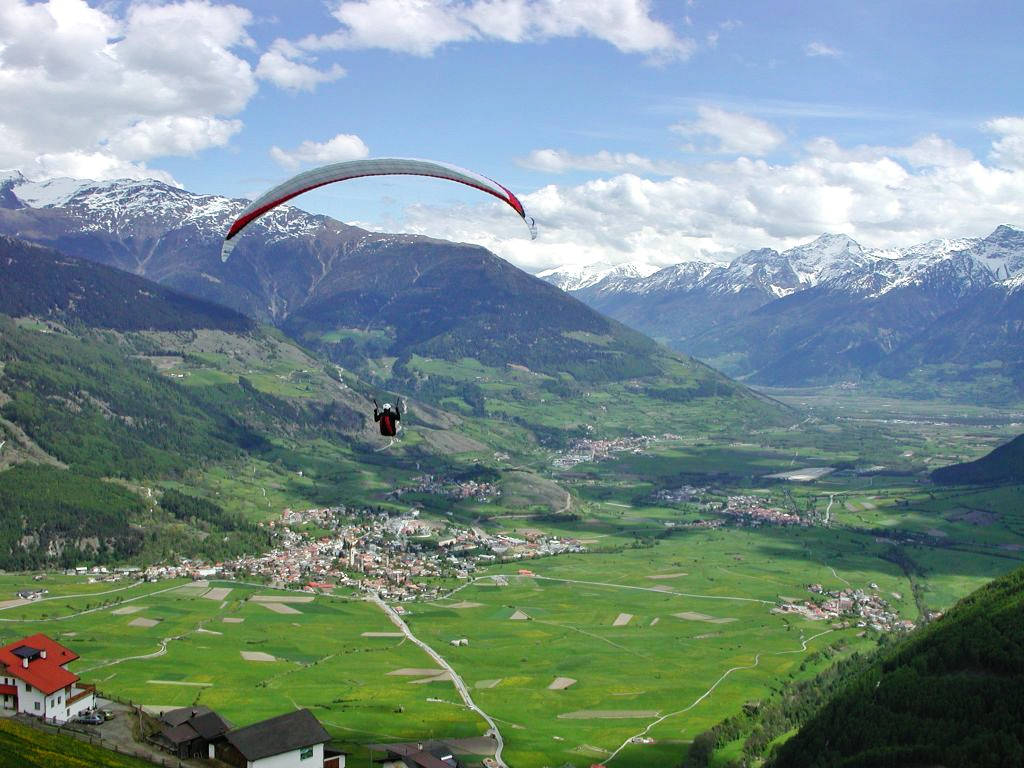
Upper Vinschgau near Mals

The Vinschgau Valley runs in a west-east orientation, from the Merano basin at Partschins up the Adige river to Reschen Pass in the northwest. The Ötztal Alps in the north, part of the Alpine crest, separate it from the upper Inn Valley. The Adige valley is further confined by the Sesvenna Alps in the west and the Ortler Alps in the south. It comprises several side valleys, such as the Suldental, the Matscher Tal, or the Schnalstal.

Vinschgau is notable for by far the largest cluster of alpine megafans in the Alps, the only known comparator globally being Shigar Valley, Karakoram Himalaya: Gadria is the greatest conventional conoid, dividing the valley at Laas, with Malser Haide exceptional for its running on down the upper valley for 11 km from its tiny source in Plawenntal. Other megafans down-valley are at Tarsch-Latsch, Tabland, and Partschins, together with nine Outsize Fans in a total cluster of 44 anomalous debris fans, for which predominantly catastrophic origins consequent on deglaciation are inferred.

Due to the insular location within the Central Eastern Alps, a rather warm climate and a lack of rain (400mm per year), fields, meadows and apple orchards are irrigated. Viticulture is also common, with notable local grapes Vernatsch (or Grauvernatsch) for light summer reds and Lagrein for winter.

According to the 2001 census, 96.51% of the population of the valley speak German, 3.41% Italian and 0.08% Ladin as first language.

== Subdivision ==
The Vinschgau District (Italian: Comprensorio della Val Venosta; German: Bezirksgemeinschaft Vinschgau) was established in 1962. The district covers the largest part of the Vinschgau region and its side valleys, in which 13 municipalities cooperate:

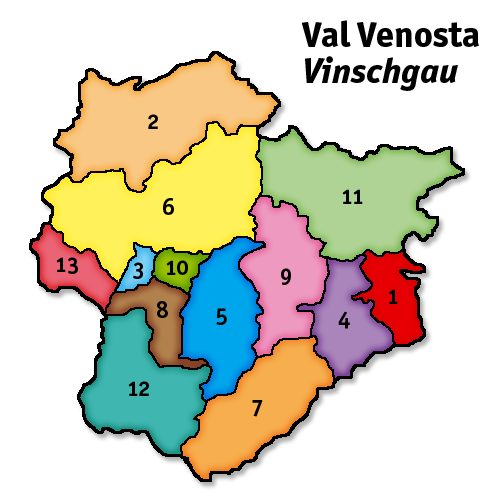
Municipalities of Vinschgau district

1. Kastelbell-Tschars (Castelbello-Ciardes)
2. Graun im Vinschgau (Curon Venosta)
3. Glurns (Glorenza)
4. Latsch (Laces)
5. Laas (Lasa)
6. Mals (Malles Venosta)
7. Martell (Martello)
8. Prad am Stilfser Joch (Prato allo Stelvio)
9. Schlanders (Silandro, the district capital)
10. Schluderns (Sluderno)
11. Schnals (Senales)
12. Stilfs (Stelvio)
13. Taufers im Münstertal (Tubre)

The municipalities of Naturns (Naturno), Plaus and Partschins (Parcines) geographically belong to the lower Vinschgau region, though politically they are affiliated with the neighbouring Burggrafenamt district.
