= Stelvio Pass =

Mountain pass in Italy, 200 m south of the Swiss border

- Italian: Passo dello Stelvio / Giogo dello Stelvio; German: Stilfser Joch
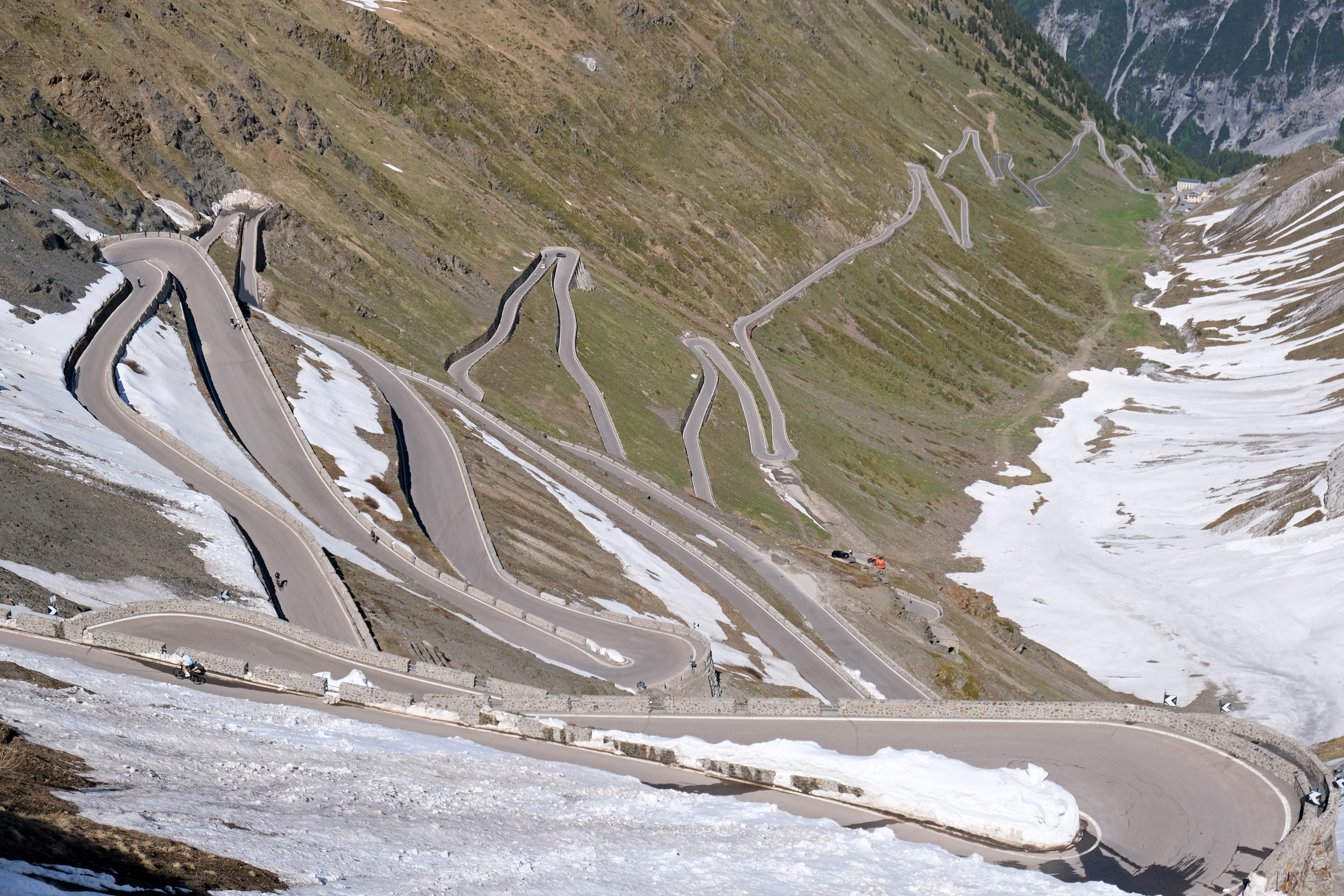
- Some of the 48 hairpin turns near the top of the eastern ramp of the Stelvio Pass

- Location within Alps
- Elevation: 2,757 m (9,045 ft)
- Traversed by: Strada Statale 38

Location
- Location: Border of South Tyrol and Sondrio provinces, Italy
- Range: Eastern Alps
- Coordinates: 46°31′43″N 10°27′10″E

The Stelvio Pass (Italian: Passo dello Stelvio [ˈpasso dello ˈstɛlvjo, - ˈstelvjo] or Giogo dello Stelvio [ˈdʒoːɡo dello ˈstɛlvjo, - ˈstelvjo]; German: Stilfser Joch [ˈʃtɪlfsɐ ˈjɔx]) is a mountain pass in northern Italy bordering Switzerland at an elevation of 2,757 m (9,045 ft) above sea level. It is the highest paved mountain pass in the Eastern Alps, and the second highest in the Alps, 7 m (23 ft) below France's Col de l'Iseran (2,764 m (9,068 ft)).

== Location ==
The pass is located in the Ortler Alps in Italy between Stilfs (Italian: Stelvio) in South Tyrol to the north-east and Bormio to the south-west in the province of Sondrio. It lies right at the border of Switzerland and is connected to Sta. Maria Val Müstair in the north by the Umbrail Pass on Stelvio's western ramp. The "Three Languages Peak" (Dreisprachenspitze) above the pass is so named because this is where the Italian, German, and Romansh language-speaking areas meet.

The road connects the Valtellina with the Vinschgau valley and the town of Meran. Adjacent to the pass road there is a large summer skiing area. Nearby mountains include Thurwieserspitze, Piz Umbrail, Piz Cotschen, and to the east, Ortler.

== History ==
The original road was built in 1820–25 by the Austrian Empire to connect the former Habsburg possession of Lombardy with Austria, covering a climb of 1,871 m (6,138 ft). The engineer and project manager was Carlo Donegani (1775–1845, in 1840 knighted as Carl Donegani von Stilfserberg). Since then, the route has changed very little. The less famous 22 km long southern part has 34 rather sweeping hairpin turns and, in the lower part near Bormio, six tunnels. The 48 mostly tight hairpin turns on the 28 km long northern side part, numbered with stones, are a challenge to motorists. Stirling Moss went off the road here during a vintage car event in the 1990s, with an onboard video of his incident being shown on satellite TV.

Before the end of World War I, it formed the border between the Austro-Hungarian Empire and the Italian Kingdom. The Swiss had an outpost and a hotel (which was destroyed) on the Dreisprachenspitze (literally, Three-Language-Peak, the third being Romansh). During World War I, fierce battles were fought in the ice and snow of the area, with gunfire even crossing the Swiss area at times. The three nations made an agreement not to fire over Swiss territory, which jutted out in between Austria (to the north) and Italy (to the south). Instead, they could fire down the pass, as Swiss territory was up and around the peak. After 1919, with the expansion of Italy, the pass lost its strategic importance.

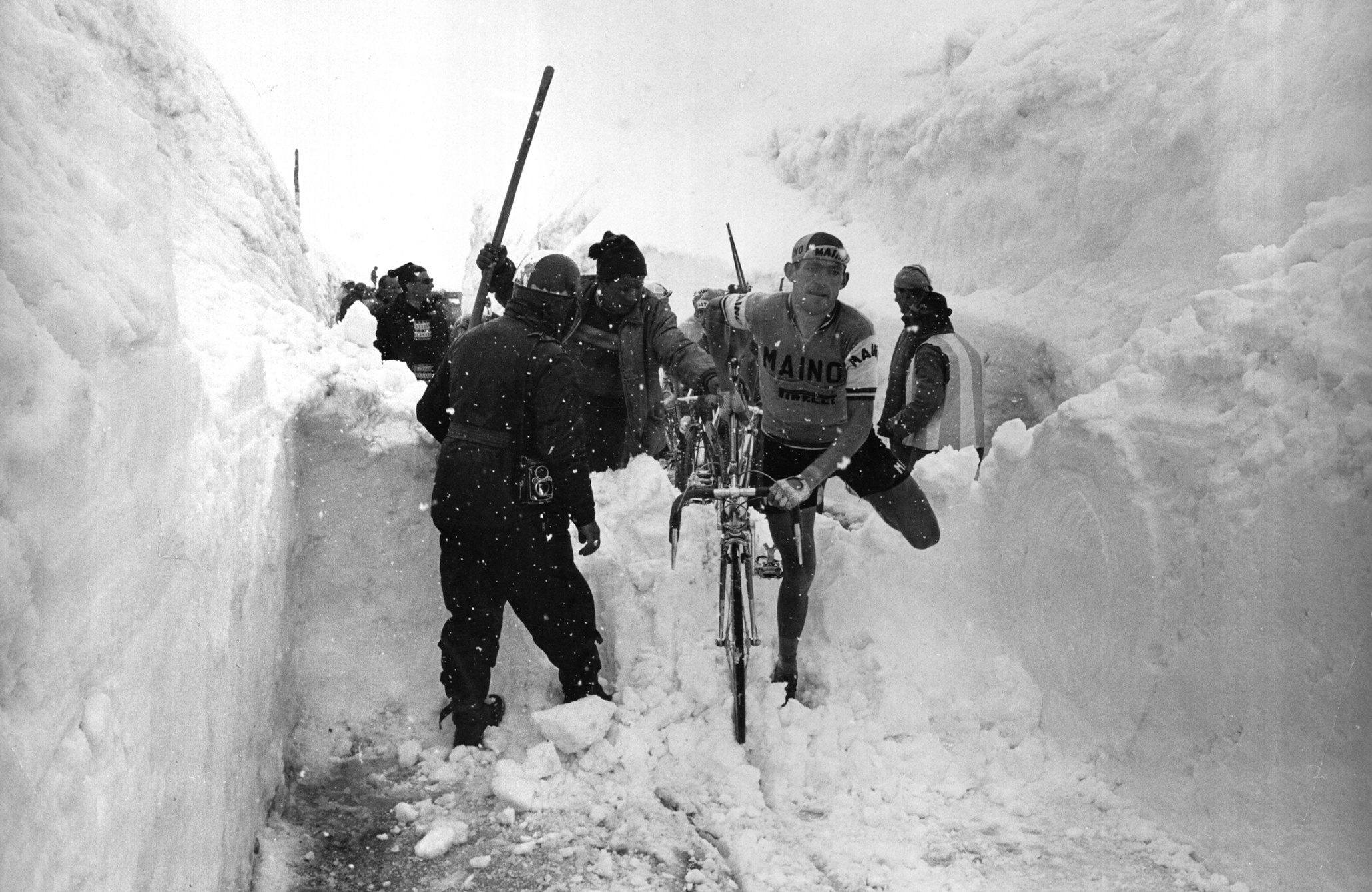
Aldo Moser navigating the snow atop the Stelvio Pass during the 1965 Giro d'Italia

The Stelvio Pass remains important for sport when it is open from May through November. Countless cyclists and motorcyclists struggle to get to the highest stretch of road in the Eastern Alps. It is the highest finish of any Grand Tour. The Giro d'Italia often crosses the Stelvio Pass (it was crossed by the Giro for the first time in 1953, when Fausto Coppi beat Hugo Koblet). As the highest peak, it has been named the Cima Coppi in each edition. Every year, the pass is closed to motor vehicles on one day in late August when about 8,000 cyclists ride and around 25 runners run to the top of the Stelvio.

Bormio regularly hosts World Cup ski racing, usually in late December for a men's downhill event; its Pista Stelvio is among the most challenging courses on the circuit.

The Stelvio Pass was also picked by the British car show Top Gear as its choice for the "greatest driving road in the world". This conclusion was reached in the first episode of the show's 10th series after the team went in search of a road that would satisfy every "petrolhead's" driving fantasies. Top Gear later decided that the Transfăgărășan Highway in Romania was a superior driving road.

In 2008, Moto Guzzi started selling a Stelvio model, named after the pass. Alfa Romeo debuted its Stelvio crossover SUV at the 2016 Los Angeles Motor Show.

The Stelvio Pass Glacier in Italy, at an altitude of 3,450 metres (11,320 ft), normally permits skiing year-round, but was closed to skiing for the first time in 90 years in August 2017 due to a heatwave.

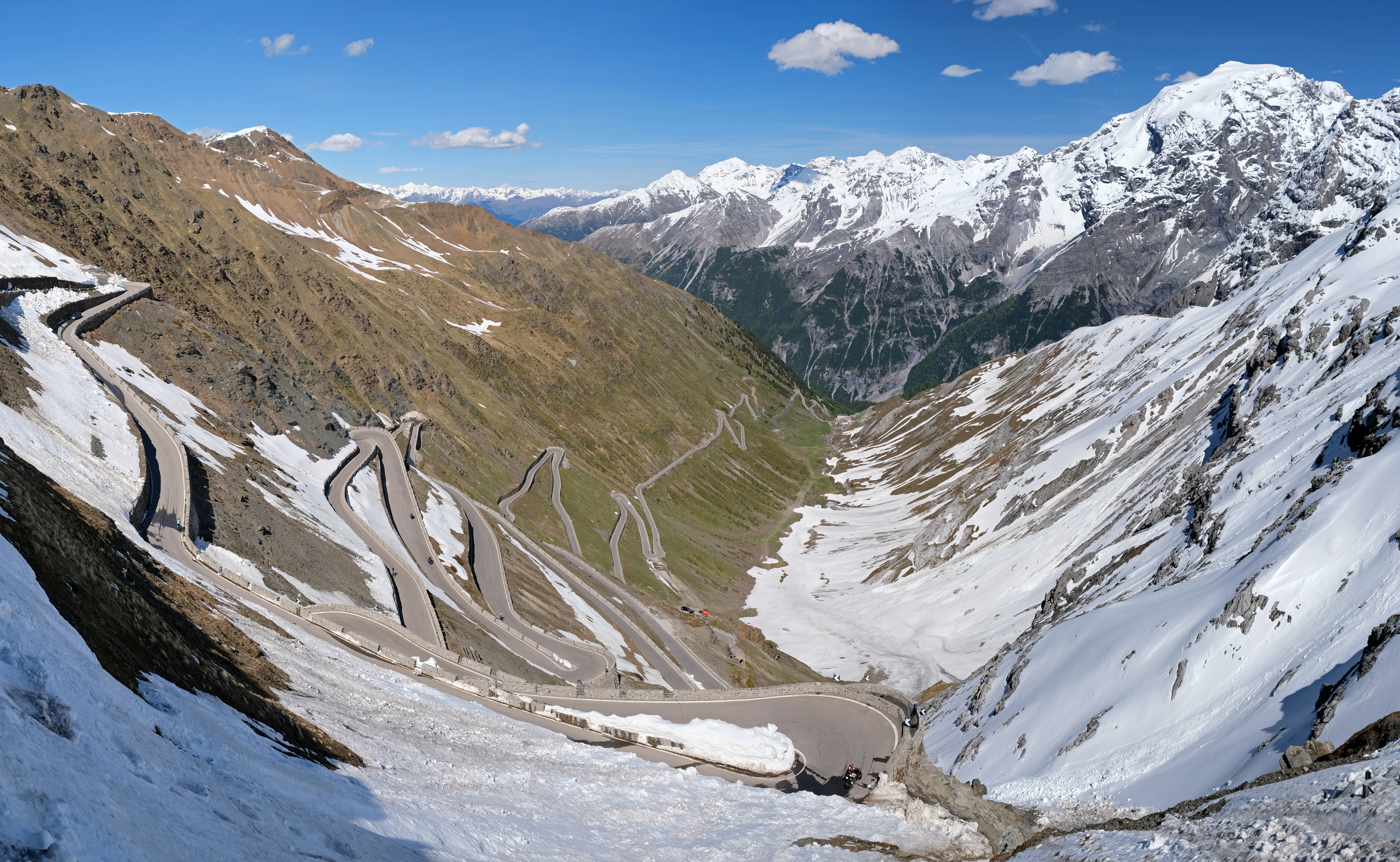
Panoramic view of eastern ramp

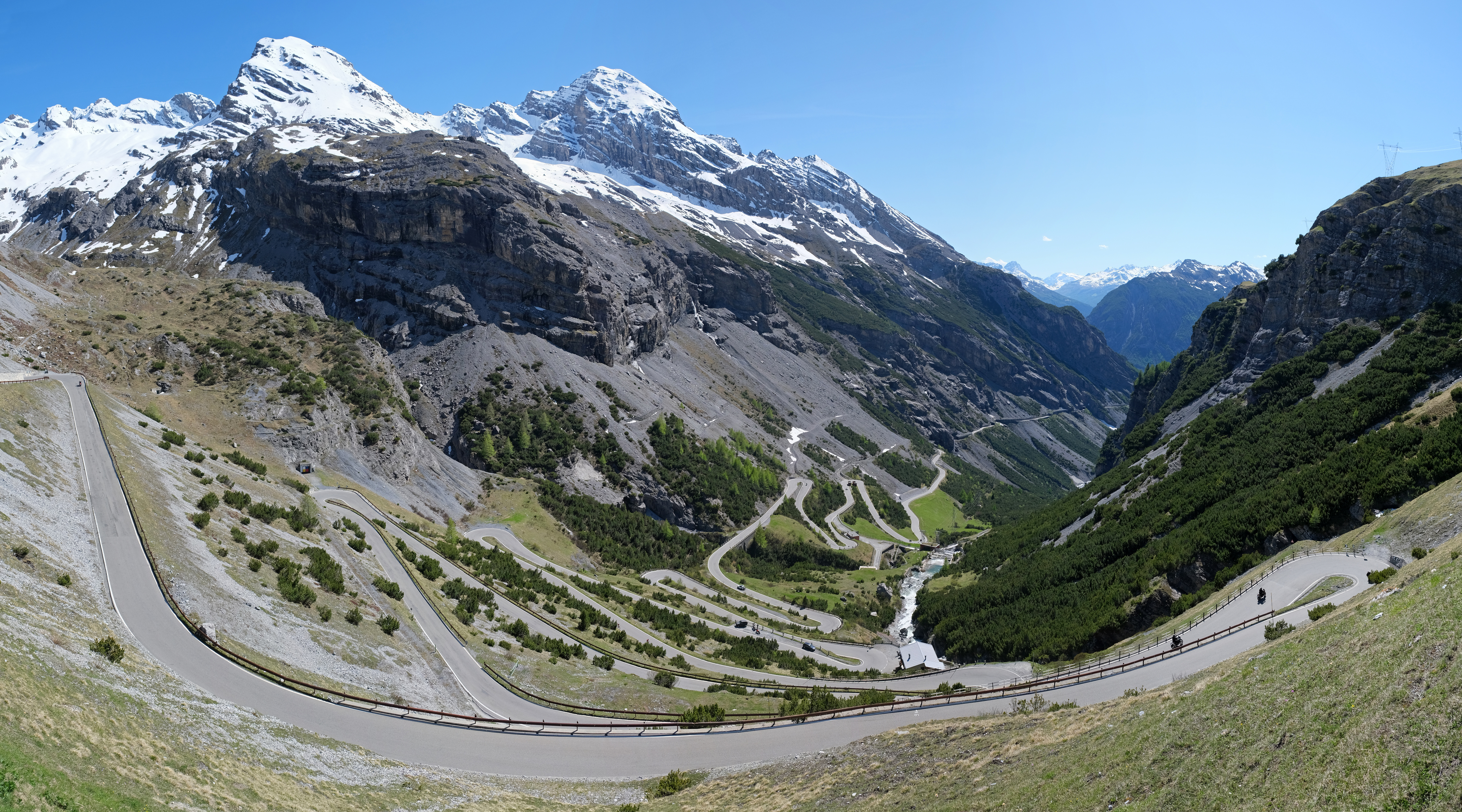
Panoramic view of western ramp

== Stelvio National Park ==
Stelvio National Park is the largest in the Italian Alps. It was established in 1935, and covers the Ortles-Cevedale massif, as well as some minor chains that flank it. Wildlife in the park include deer, chamois, ibex, and wolves. Hiking in the park is possible with numerous trails and mountain huts.

== Stelvio Bike Day ==
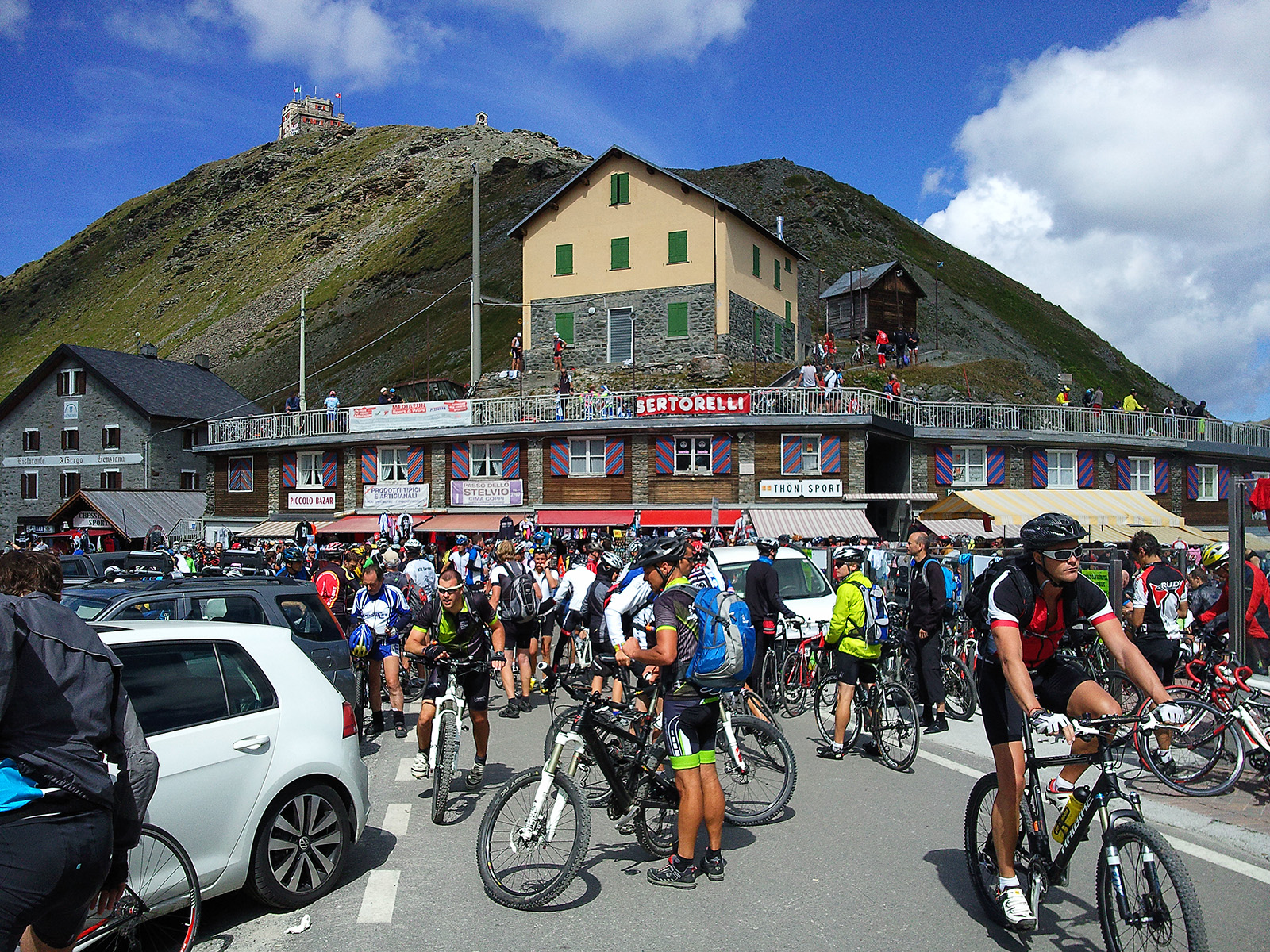
Stelvio Bike Day 2013

Each year on the last Saturday of August or the first Saturday of September the Stelvio National Park administration organizes the Stelvio Bike Day. On that day the roads from Bormio and Prad to the pass, as well as the road from Santa Maria Val Müstair to the Umbrail Pass are closed to all traffic except for bicycles. On average, around 12,000 cyclists participate in the Bike Day, with the majority taking the road from Prad to the pass and the descent over the Umbrail pass to Val Müstair.

Since 2017 there has also been a Stelvio Marathon for runners, from Prad to Glurns, back to Prad and thence through Stilfs (Stelvio village) to the pass. The first was held on 17 June 2017, with over 300 participants. The second was held on 16 June 2018 and the third on 31 August 2019.

== Appearances in Giro d'Italia (since 1953) ==
| Year | Stage | Category | Start | Finish | Leader at the summit | Winner of the stage |
|---|---|---|---|---|---|---|
| 1953 | 20 | - | Bolzano | Bormio | Fausto Coppi (ITA) | Fausto Coppi (ITA) |
| 1956 | 20 | - | Sondrio | Merano | Aurelio Del Rio (ITA) | Charly Gaul (LUX) |
| 1961 | 20 | - | Trento | Bormio | Charly Gaul (LUX) | Charly Gaul (LUX) |
| 1965 | 20 | Cima Coppi | Madesimo | Passo dello Stelvio | Graziano Battistini (ITA) | Graziano Battistini (ITA) |
| 1972 | 17 | Cima Coppi | Livigno | Passo dello Stelvio | José Manuel Fuente (ESP) | José Manuel Fuente (ESP) |
| 1975 | 21 | Cima Coppi | Alleghe | Passo dello Stelvio | Francisco Galdós (ESP) | Francisco Galdós (ESP) |
| 1980 | 20 | Cima Coppi | Cles | Sondrio | Jean-René Bernaudeau (FRA) | Jean-René Bernaudeau (FRA) |
| 1994 | 15 | Cima Coppi | Merano | Aprica | Franco Vona (ITA) | Marco Pantani (ITA) |
| 2005 | 14 | Cima Coppi | Neumarkt | Livigno | José Rujano (VEN) | Iván Parra (COL) |
| 2012 | 20 | Cima Coppi | Val di Sole | Passo dello Stelvio | Thomas de Gendt (BEL) | Thomas de Gendt (BEL) |
| 2014 | 16 | Cima Coppi | Ponte di Legno | Val Martello (Martelltal) | Dario Cataldo (ITA) | Nairo Quintana (COL) |
| 2017 | 16 | Cima Coppi | Rovetta | Bormio | Mikel Landa Meana (ESP) | Vincenzo Nibali (ITA) |
| 2020 | 18 | Cima Coppi | Pinzolo | Laghi di Cancano | Rohan Dennis (AUS) | Jai Hindley (AUS) |

== See also ==
- List of highest paved roads in Europe
- List of mountain passes
- Transfăgărășan
- Trollstigen
