= Matscher Tal =

Coordinates: 46°43′08″N 10°39′40″E

The Matscher Tal (also German: Matschertal; Italian: Val di Mazia [ˈval di ˈmattsja]) is a side valley of the Vinschgau in South Tyrol, Italy. It is part of the municipality of Mals.
