= Thomas Moriggl =

Italian cross-country skier

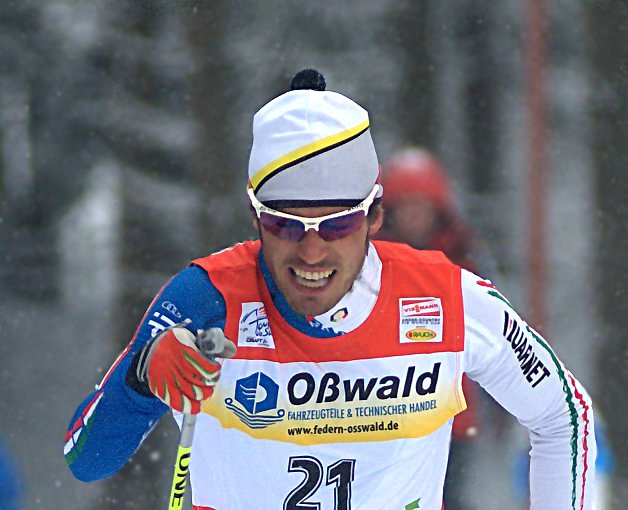
- Thomas Moriggl in 2010

Personal information
- Nationality: Italy
- Born: 23 February 1981 (age 45) Schlanders, Italy

Sport
- Sport: Skiing

World Cup career
- Seasons: 12 – (2003–2014)
- Indiv. starts: 92
- Indiv. podiums: 2
- Indiv. wins: 0
- Team starts: 13
- Team podiums: 0
- Overall titles: 0 – (35th in 2011)
- Discipline titles: 0
Medal record
Men's cross-country skiing
Representing Italy
U23 World Championships
Gold medal – first place	2004 Park City	20 km skiathlon
Gold medal – first place	2004 Park City	30 km freestyle
Silver medal – second place	2003 Valdidentro	15 km skiathlon

Thomas Moriggl (born 23 February 1981 in Schlanders) is an Italian cross-country skier who has competed since 2000. At the 2010 Winter Olympics, he finished 24th in both the 15 km and 30 km mixed pursuit events.

Moriggl also finished 36th in the 50 km event at the FIS Nordic World Ski Championships 2005 in Oberstdorf. His best World Cup finish was third on two occasions (2004: 30 km, 2005: 15 km).

Thomas Moriggl is the brother of fellow Olympic cross-country skier Barbara Moriggl, and lives in Schlinig, Vinschgau.

== Cross-country skiing results ==
All results are sourced from the International Ski Federation (FIS).

=== Olympic Games ===
Year	Age	15 km individual	30 km skiathlon	50 km mass start	Sprint	4 × 10 km relay	Team sprint
2010	29	24	24	—	—	—	—

=== World Championships ===
Year	Age	15 km individual	30 km skiathlon	50 km mass start	Sprint	4 × 10 km relay	Team sprint
2005	24	—	—	36	—	—	—
2011	30	33	—	21	—	—	—
2013	32	59	—	—	—	—	—

=== World Cup ===
==== Season standings ====
Season	Age	Discipline standings			Ski Tour standings		
Season	Age	Overall	Distance	Sprint	Nordic Opening	Tour de Ski	World Cup Final
2003	22	NC	—N/a	—	—N/a	—N/a	—N/a
2004	23	66	43	—	—N/a	—N/a	—N/a
2005	24	43	26	—	—N/a	—N/a	—N/a
2006	25	171	124	—	—N/a	—N/a	—N/a
2007	26	NC	NC	—	—N/a	—	—N/a
2008	27	70	47	103	—N/a	—	11
2009	28	NC	NC	—	—N/a	—	—
2010	29	61	32	NC	—N/a	33	—
2011	30	35	29	NC	—	18	15
2012	31	48	33	NC	—	21	DNF
2013	32	67	59	NC	42	25	—
2014	33	119	71	NC	—	39	—

==== Individual podiums ====
- 2 podiums

No.	Season	Date	Location	Race	Level	Place
1	2003–04	14 March 2004	Pragelato, Italy	30 km Individual F	World Cup	3rd
2	2004–05	6 March 2005	Lahti, Finland	15 km Individual F	World Cup	3rd
