= Zerzer Tal =

Valley in South Tyrol, Italy

Coordinates: 46°44′32″N 10°29′51″E

The Zerzer Tal is a side valley of the Vinschgau in South Tyrol, Italy.
