= Suldental =

Coordinates: 46°33′58″N 10°33′30″E

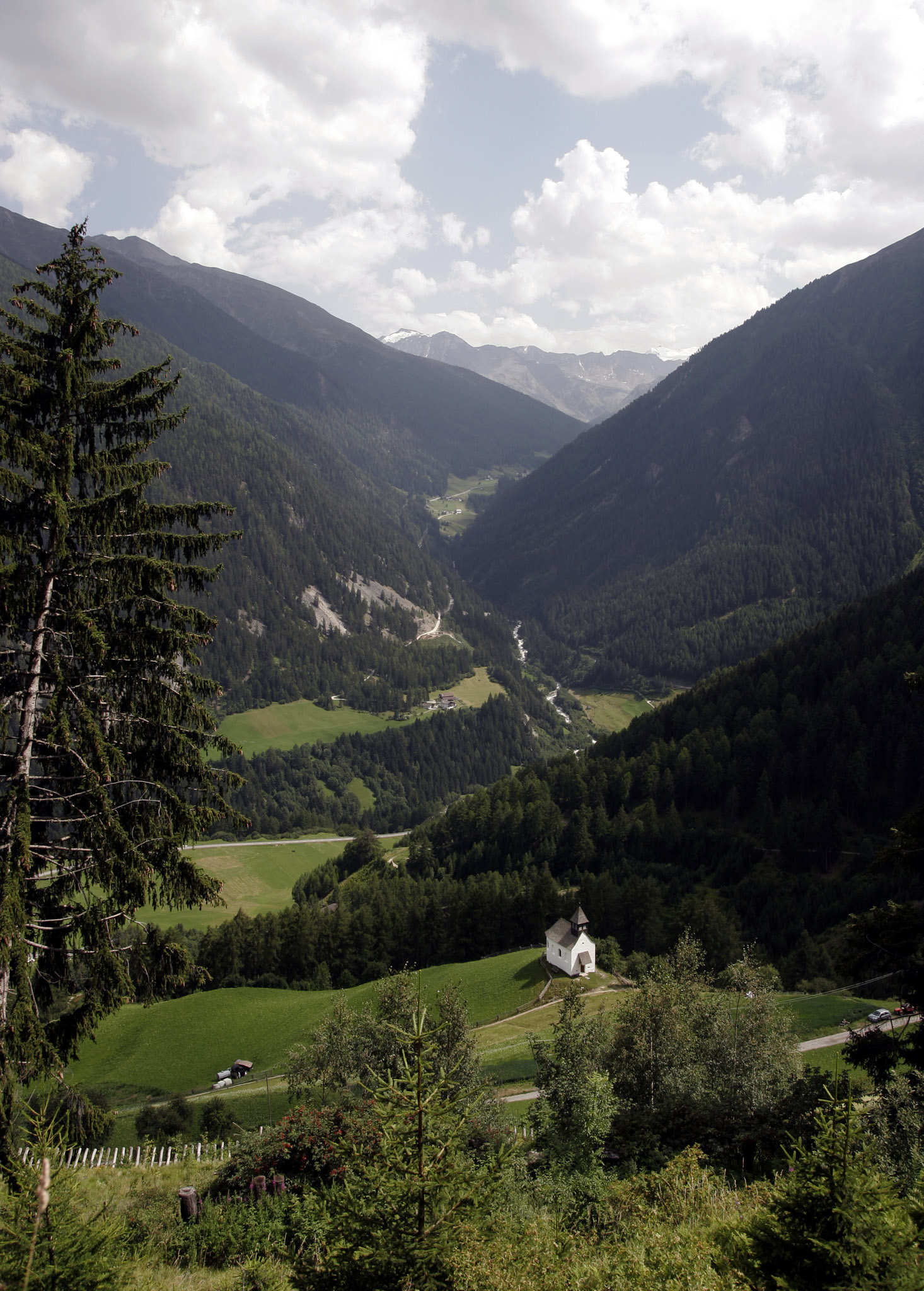
Entry to the Suldental as seen from Stilfs

The Suldental (Italian: Val di Solda; German: Suldental) is a side valley of the Trafoi Valley in South Tyrol, Italy. The village in the valley is Sulden.
