= Prad (disambiguation) =

Prad is a place.

It may also mean:

- abbreviation of petaradian (Prad), a unit of angle
- abbreviation of picoradian (prad), a unit of angle
- abbreviation of petarad (Prad), a unit of radiation dose
- abbreviation of picorad (prad), a unit of radiation dose
