= Mals =

- Comune
- Gemeinde Mals; Comune di Malles Venosta
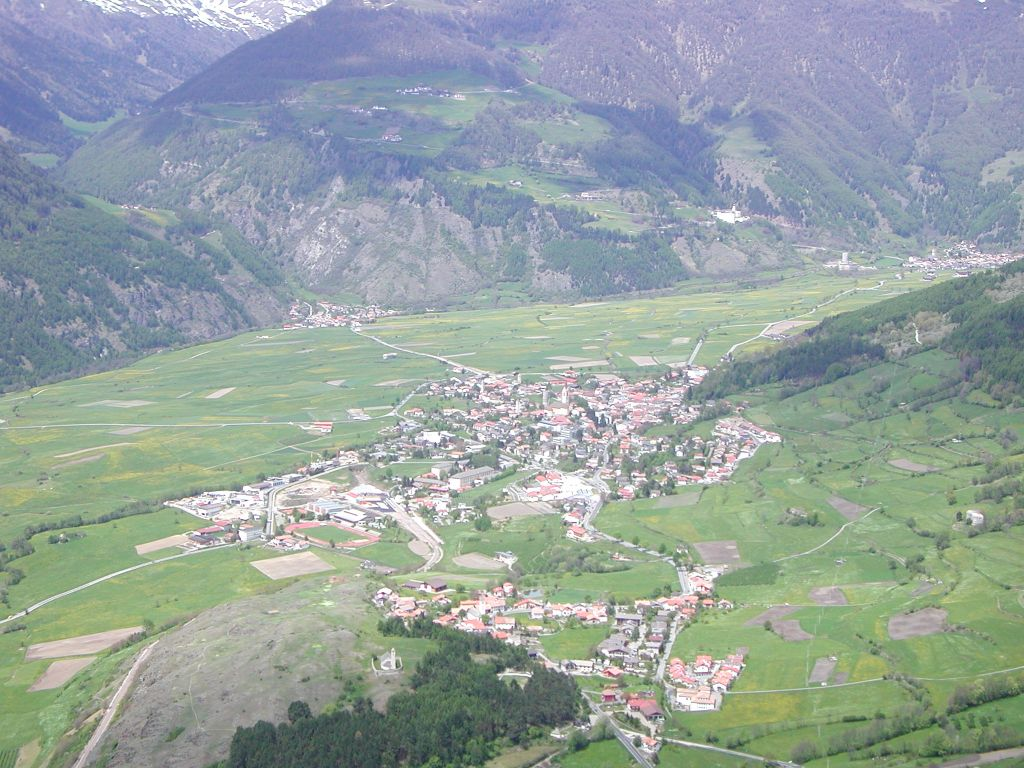
- View of Mals

- Coat of arms

- Location within Italy Location within Trentino-Alto Adige/Südtirol
- Coordinates: 46°42′N 10°33′E
- Country: Italy
- Region: Trentino-Alto Adige/Südtirol
- Province: South Tyrol (BZ)
- Frazioni: Burgeis (Burgusio), Laatsch (Laudes), Matsch (Mazia), Planeil (Planol), Plawenn (Piavenna), Schleis (Clusio), Schlinig (Slingia), Tartsch (Tarces), Ulten-Alsack (Alsago-Ultimo)

Government
  - Mayor: Josef Thurner

Area
  - Total: 246.7 km^{2} (95.3 sq mi)
- Elevation: 1,051 m (3,448 ft)

Population (Nov. 2010)
  - Total: 5,092
  - Density: 20.64/km^{2} (53.46/sq mi)
- Demonym(s): German: Malser; Italian: mallesi
- Time zone: UTC+1 (CET)
  - Summer (DST): UTC+2 (CEST)
- Postal code: 39024
- Dialing code: 0473
- Website: Official website

Mals (German pronunciation: [mals]; Italian: Malles Venosta [ˈmallez veˈnɔsta]) is a comune (municipality) and a village in South Tyrol in northern Italy, located about 70 kilometres (43 mi) northwest of Bolzano, on the border with Switzerland and Austria.

== History ==
=== Coat-of-arms ===
The emblem is party per fess: the upper of gules a fess argent, at the bottom or three gules circles arranged in a triangle upside-down. It is the combination of coats of arms of the House of Austria and Medici. The emblem was adopted in 1928.

== Geography ==
As of 30 November 2010, it had a population of 5,092 and an area of 246.7 square kilometres (95.3 mi^{2}). The Zerzer Tal, a side valley of the Vinschgau, is in Mals.

Mals borders the following municipalities: Graun im Vinschgau, Glurns, Laas, Scuol (Switzerland), Schnals, Sent (Switzerland), Schlanders, Schluderns, Sölden (Austria), and Taufers im Münstertal.

=== Frazioni ===
The municipality of Mals contains the frazioni (subdivisions, mainly villages and hamlets): Burgeis (Burgusio), Laatsch (Laudes), Matsch (Mazia), Planeil (Planol), Plawenn (Piavenna), Schleis (Clusio), Schlinig (Slingia), Tartsch (Tarces), and Ulten-Alsack (Alsago-Ultimo).

=== Climate and Temperature ===
Climate data for Mals ITA, 2009–2018 normals
Month	Jan	Feb	Mar	Apr	May	Jun	Jul	Aug	Sep	Oct	Nov	Dec	Year
Record high °C (°F)	3 (37)	3 (37)	7 (45)	13 (55)	19 (66)	22 (72)	24 (75)	24 (75)	20 (68)	17 (63)	12 (54)	4 (39)	24 (75)
Mean maximum °C (°F)	0.8 (33.4)	1.2 (34.2)	3.0 (37.4)	7.6 (45.7)	14.6 (58.3)	20.4 (68.7)	21.2 (70.2)	21.8 (71.2)	16.9 (62.4)	12.6 (54.7)	5.9 (42.6)	1.9 (35.4)	22.6 (72.7)
Mean daily maximum °C (°F)	−4.0 (24.8)	−3.9 (25.0)	−0.6 (30.9)	2.6 (36.7)	7.3 (45.1)	12.9 (55.2)	16.0 (60.8)	15.9 (60.6)	11.7 (53.1)	6.2 (43.2)	0.4 (32.7)	−3.3 (26.1)	5.1 (41.2)
Daily mean °C (°F)	−8.7 (16.3)	−8.8 (16.2)	−5.4 (22.3)	−1.8 (28.8)	2.8 (37.0)	7.9 (46.2)	10.5 (50.9)	10.5 (50.9)	6.8 (44.2)	2.0 (35.6)	−3.2 (26.2)	−7.3 (18.9)	0.4 (32.7)
Mean daily minimum °C (°F)	−13.3 (8.1)	−13.7 (7.3)	−10.2 (13.6)	−6.1 (21.0)	−1.8 (28.8)	2.8 (37.0)	4.9 (40.8)	5.1 (41.2)	1.9 (35.4)	−2.3 (27.9)	−6.7 (19.9)	−11.2 (11.8)	−4.2 (24.4)
Mean minimum °C (°F)	−24.4 (−11.9)	−25.3 (−13.5)	−20.6 (−5.1)	−15.8 (3.6)	−10.1 (13.8)	−4.1 (24.6)	0.0 (32.0)	0.0 (32.0)	−2.8 (27.0)	−12.0 (10.4)	−17.1 (1.2)	−20.9 (−5.6)	−27.5 (−17.5)
Record low °C (°F)	−32.0 (−25.6)	−29.0 (−20.2)	−27.0 (−16.6)	−22.0 (−7.6)	−18.0 (−0.4)	−11.0 (12.2)	−1.0 (30.2)	−2.0 (28.4)	−6.0 (21.2)	−18.0 (−0.4)	−34 (−29)	−26 (−15)	−34 (−29)
Average rainfall mm (inches)	16.37 (0.64)	18.50 (0.73)	18.43 (0.73)	25.90 (1.02)	30.85 (1.21)	32.41 (1.28)	29.00 (1.14)	32.83 (1.29)	35.02 (1.38)	53.43 (2.10)	31.29 (1.23)	21.66 (0.85)	345.67 (13.61)
Average snowfall cm (inches)	13.5 (5.3)	15.5 (6.1)	14.5 (5.7)	20.1 (7.9)	19.8 (7.8)	8.3 (3.3)	1.3 (0.5)	3.2 (1.3)	14.0 (5.5)	31.2 (12.3)	23.4 (9.2)	16.4 (6.5)	181.3 (71.4)
Average relative humidity (%)	90.9	92.7	92.6	92.4	89.6	81.7	77.8	79.8	81.2	83.4	89.0	85.9	86.4
Source: World Weather Online

Mals has a cool, wet climate. Frost is common from October to May and is even recorded in the summer, although temperatures below −1C are rare from June to September. Most winter days fail to rise above freezing. Summer is generally mild, but most summers see temperatures rise above 20C on several days.

== Transportation ==
The commune is the northern terminus of the train from Meran. The trip from Merano takes approximately 1 hour 15 minutes. Trains depart hourly. There is also local bus service between Mals and Schlanders.

== Notable people ==
- Johann Rufinatscha (1812–1893), an Austrian composer, theorist and music teacher
- Walter Caldonazzi (1916–1945), an important resistance fighter against Nazi Germany
- Karl Plattner (1919–1986), painter.
- Gabriel Grüner (1963–1999), journalist for Stern magazine, shot by Yugoslav soldiers

== Society ==
=== Linguistic distribution ===
According to the 2024 census, 97.23% of the population speak German, 2.70% Italian and 0.06% Ladin as first language.

=== Demographic evolution ===
Historical population

Year	Pop.	±%
1860	?	—
1870	?	—
1880	3,888	—
1900	?	—
1910	3,725	—

Year	Pop.	±%
1921	3,947	+6.0%
1931	4,025	+2.0%
1936	4,141	+2.9%
1951	4,460	+7.7%
1961	4,540	+1.8%

Year	Pop.	±%
1971	4,694	+3.4%
1981	4,569	−2.7%
1991	4,608	+0.9%
2001	4,835	+4.9%

Source: Data from ISTAT

== Gallery ==
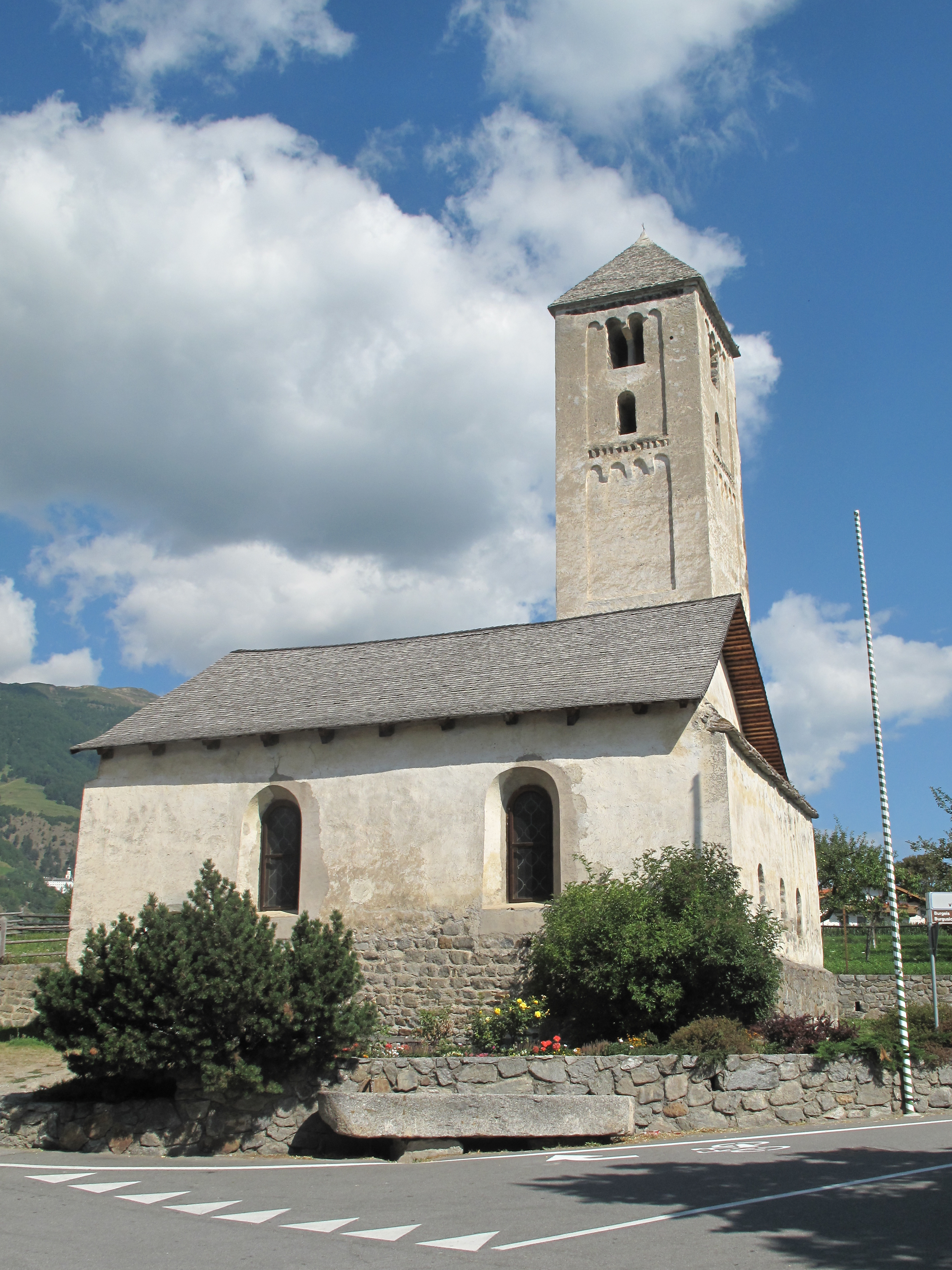
St. Benedict's Church in Mals

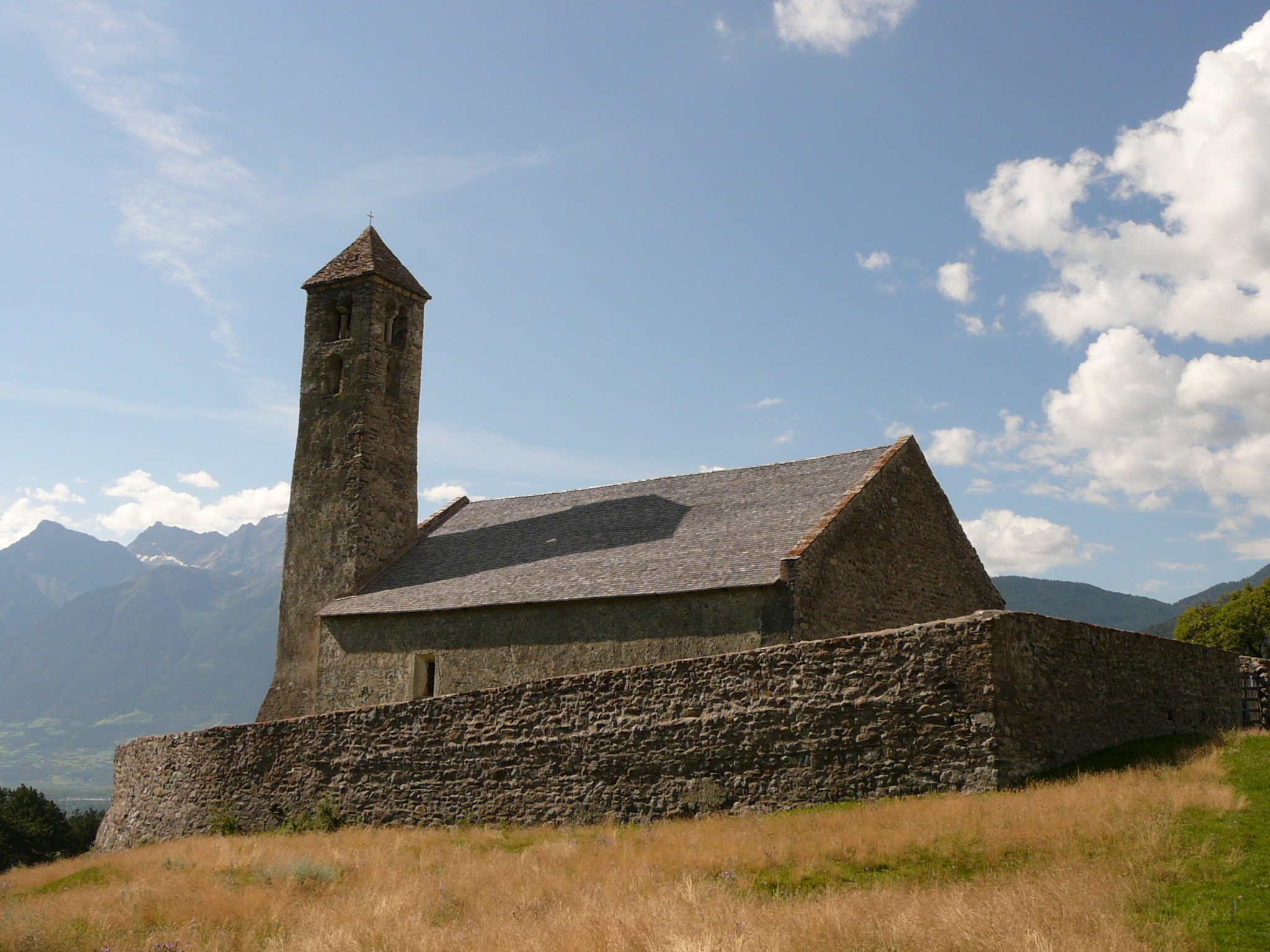
St. Veit am Bichl in Tartsch

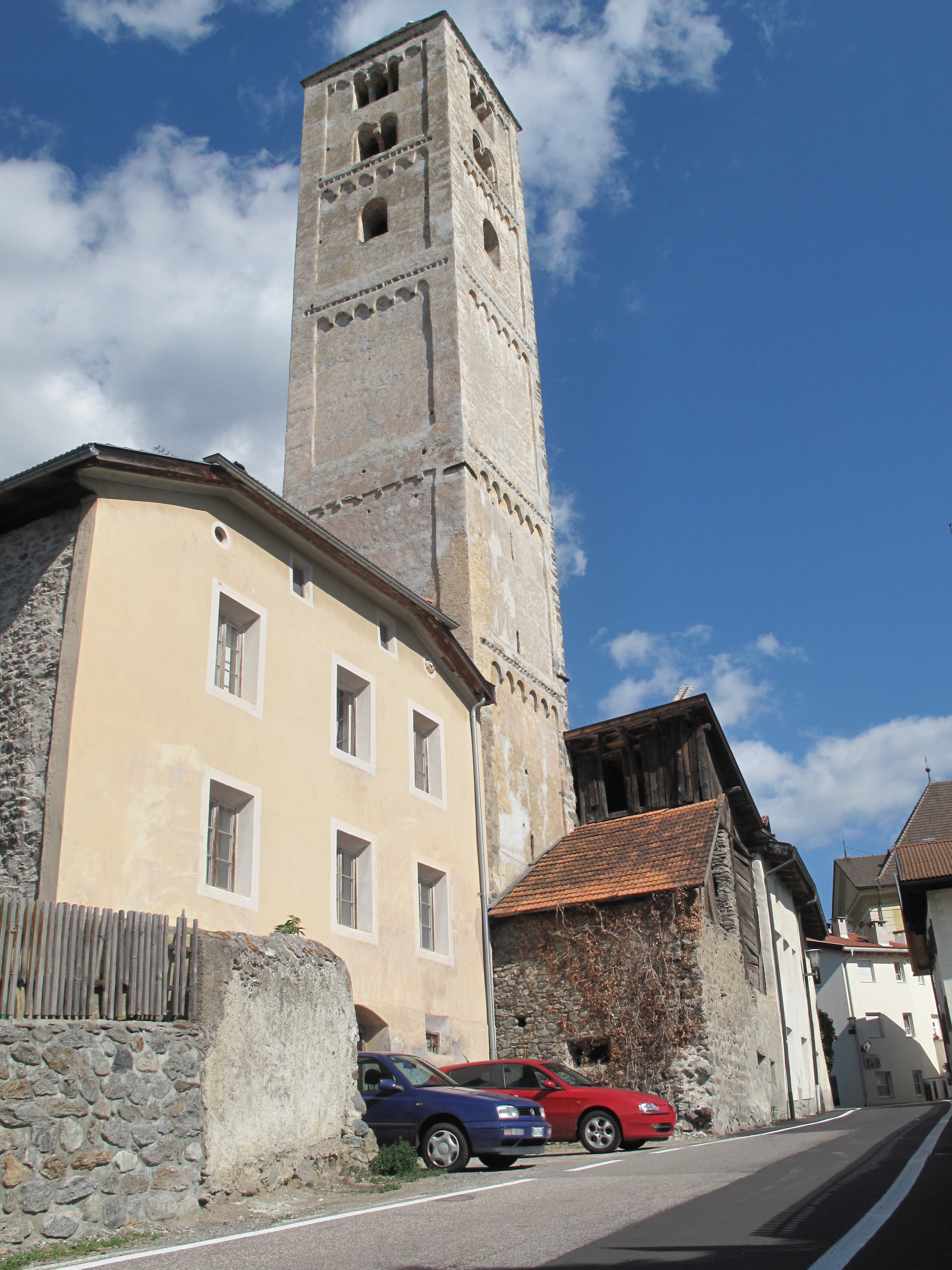
Tower of the old St. John's Church

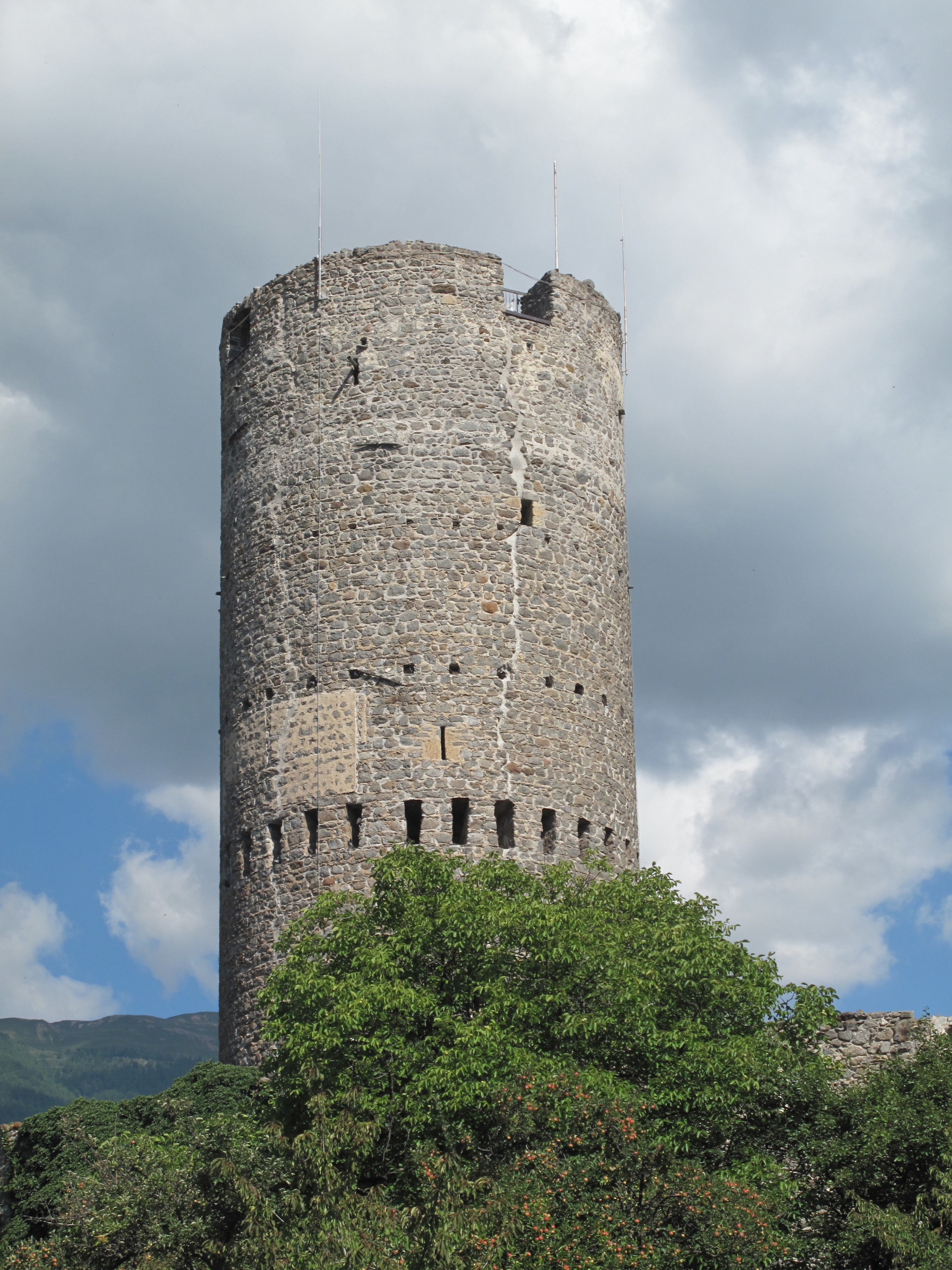
The tower Fröhlichsturm in Mals
