= Karl Plattner =

Italian painter

- Born: February 13, 1919; Mals, Italy
- Died: December 8, 1986 (aged 67); Milan, Italy
- Occupation: Painter

Karl Plattner (13 February 1919 – 8 December 1986) was an Italian painter.

== Biography ==
Plattner was born on 13 February 1919 in Mals as one of ten children. After he left school, he apprenticed as a painter, first in Mals and later in Brixen.

There, he became acquainted with Sebastian Fasal, Professor of the Academy of Fine Arts Vienna, where he studied mural painting.

During Second World War he was a soldier in the German Wehrmacht and was put into an American prisoner-of-war camp by Livorno. After his captivity he continue his studies in Florence, Milan and Paris. At this time, he received the first public contracts in South Tyrol for fresco paintings.

In 1952 he and his wife moved to Brazil and exhibited his works in Rio de Janeiro and São Paulo. He also received important contracts in Brazil.

In 1956 he became acquainted with Clemens Holzmeister. With him he realized the artistic representation of the box vestibule in the new Great Festival Hall of Salzburg.

In 1961 he moved to Tourrettes-sur-Loup and Cipières in Southern France. From 1963 to 1978 he lived in Milan. He died on 8 December 1986 in Milan.

== Works ==
- 1951 – Pietà
- 1954 – Big mural in the conference hall of the South Tyrolean Landtag in Bolzano
- 1965 – Nächtliches Zwiegespräch
- 1967 – Vietnam
- 1971 – Fra due finestre
