= Laas, South Tyrol =

Laas
- Comune
- Gemeinde Laas; Comune di Lasa
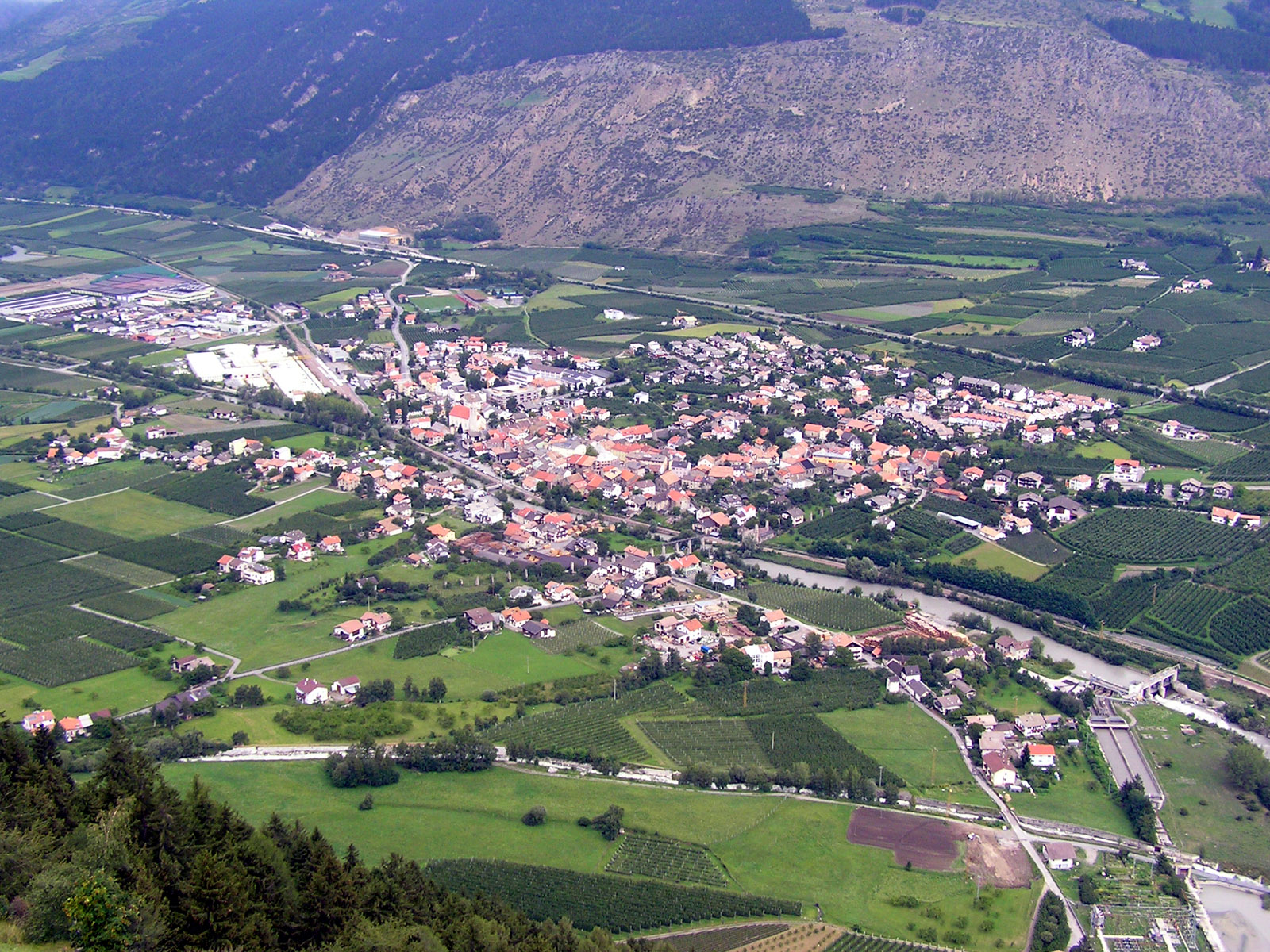
- View of Laas

- Location within Italy Location within Trentino-Alto Adige/Südtirol
- Coordinates: 46°37′N 10°42′E
- Country: Italy
- Region: Trentino-Alto Adige/Südtirol
- Province: South Tyrol (BZ)
- Frazioni: Allitz (Alliz), Eyrs (Oris), Tanas, Tschengls (Cengles)

Government
  - Mayor: Verena Tröger

Area
  - Total: 110.1 km^{2} (42.5 sq mi)

Population (Nov. 2010)
  - Total: 3,938
  - Density: 35.77/km^{2} (92.64/sq mi)
- Demonym(s): German:Laaser; Italian: lasini
- Time zone: UTC+1 (CET)
  - Summer (DST): UTC+2 (CEST)
- Postal code: 39023
- Dialing code: 0473
- Website: Official website

Laas (German pronunciation: [laːs]; Italian: Lasa [ˈlaːza]) is a comune (municipality) in the province of South Tyrol in northern Italy, located about 50 kilometres (31 mi) west of the city of Bolzano.

== Geography ==
As of 30 November 2010, it had a population of 3,983 and an area of 110.1 square kilometres (42.5 mi^{2}).

The municipality of Laas contains the frazioni (subdivisions, mainly villages and hamlets) Allitz (Alliz), Eyrs (Oris), Tanas, and Tschengls (Cengles).

Laas (Lasa) borders the following municipalities: Mals, Martell, Prad, Schlanders, Schluderns, and Stilfs.

== Geology ==
Laas stands on one of the largest conical debris fans in the Alps, known as Gadriamure, which emerges from the narrow valley above the village of Allitz. This fan may be of catastrophic origin, with the collapse of a mountain above the present Gadriatal. The fan blocks the main valley Vinschgau and displaces the River Etsch to its south edge, where it is cut by a gorge which revealed buried logs 7300 years old. The fan now supports irrigated fruit orchards.

== Economy ==
=== Lasa marble ===
Laas is known for the pure white marble (known in German, Italian and English as "Laaser Marmor", "Lasa marmo" and "Lasa marble", respectively) quarried in the mountains south of the village which has been used in buildings worldwide, including the Victoria Memorial, London. All 15 American World War II cemeteries managed by the American Battle Monuments Commission, like e.g. the Normandy American Cemetery and Memorial, use exclusively pure white Lasa marble gravestones. Between 1949 and 1962 a total of 90,156 Lasa marble gravestones were delivered to the American Battle Monuments Commission and to this day damaged gravestones are only replaced by an equally perfectly white Lasa marble gravestone.

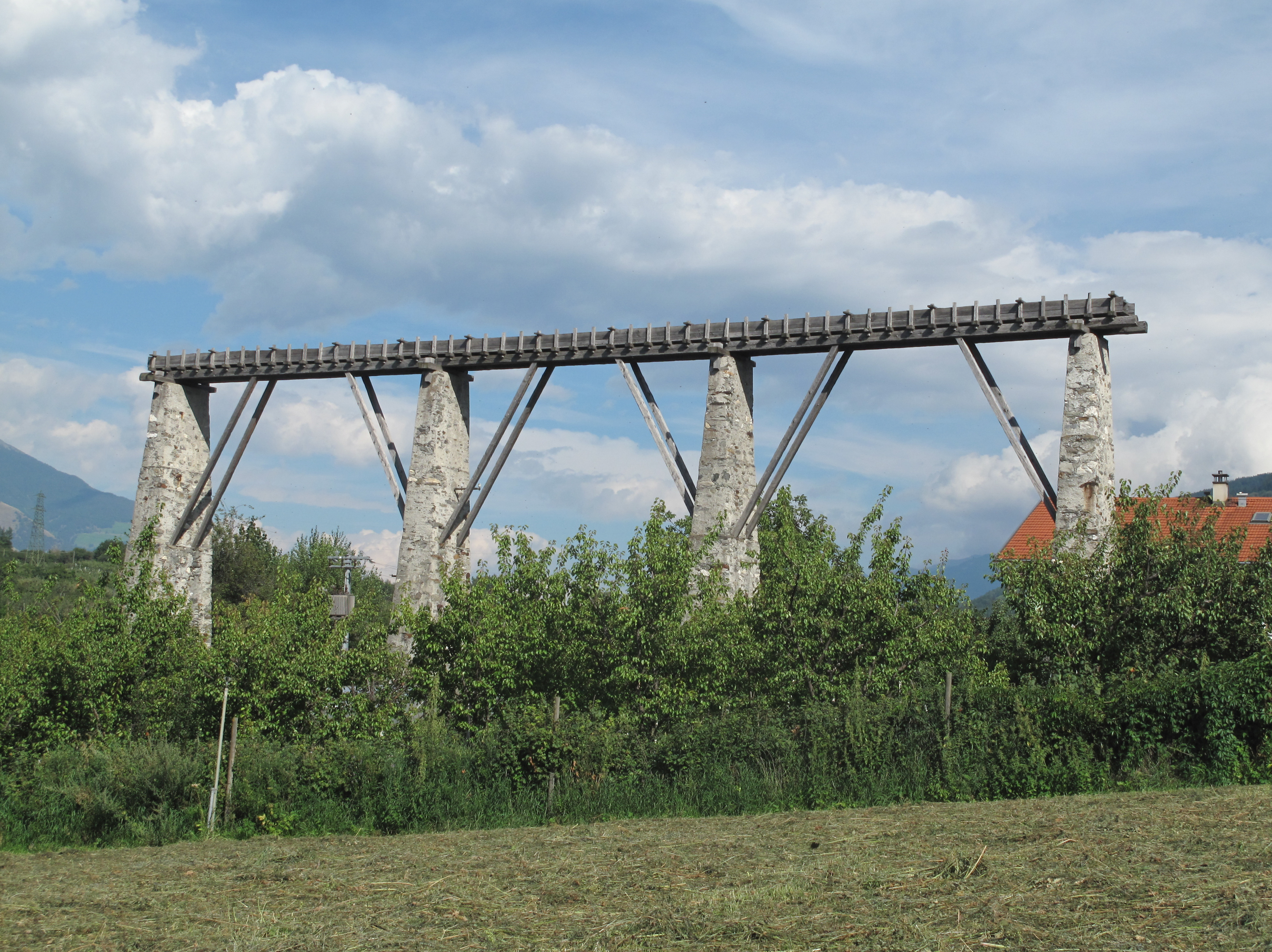
The Kandlwaal in Laas, an old irrigation canal

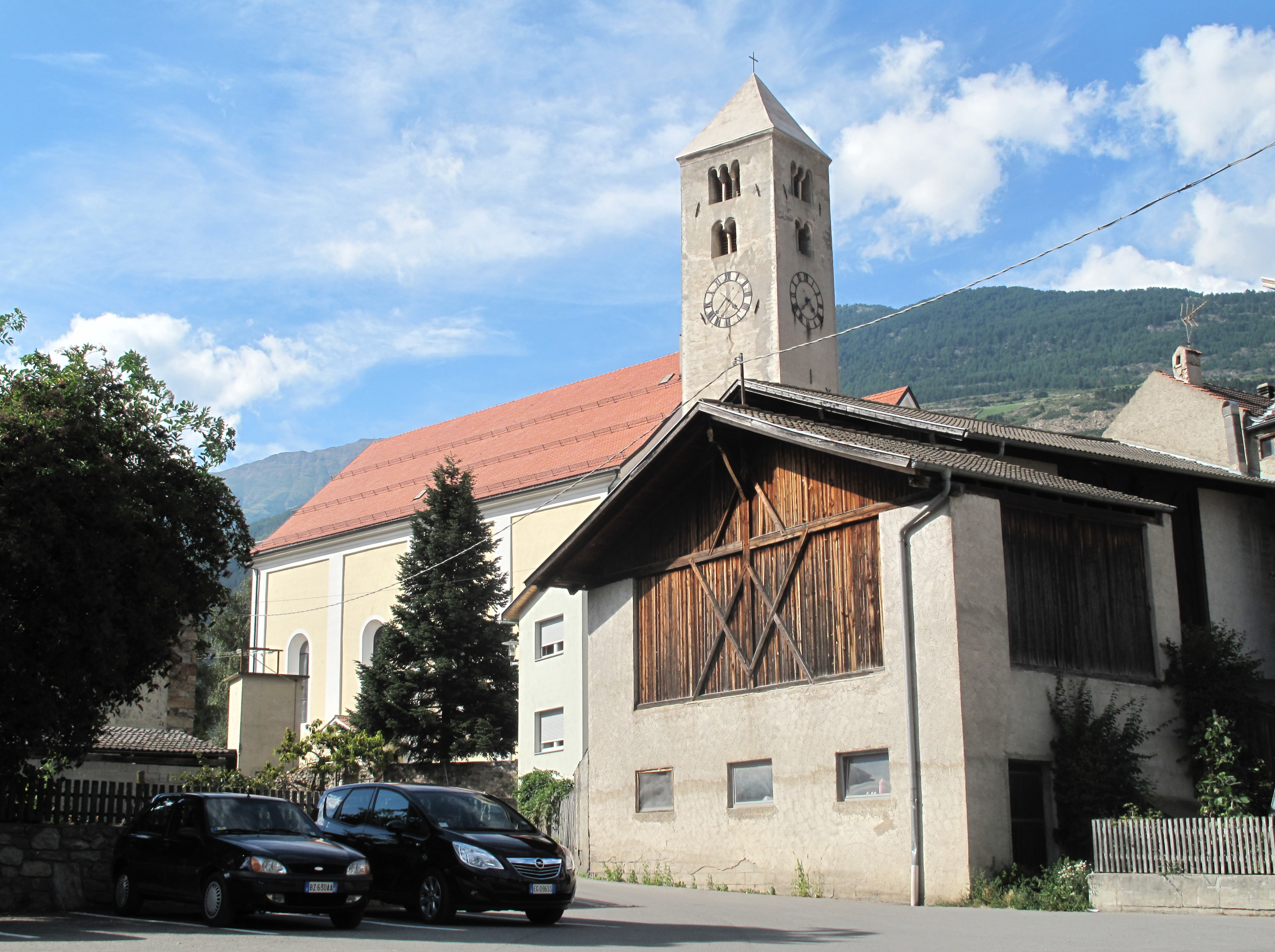
The parish church of Laas

== History ==
=== Coat of arms ===
The emblem is a gules hammer and two bits, on argent with sable stripes. The white and black symbolizes the layers of marble, the hammer and the bits the tools for its processing.

== Society ==
=== Linguistic distribution ===
According to the 2011 census, 97.45% of the population speak German, 2.41% Italian and 0.13% Ladin as first language.

=== Demographic evolution ===
Historical population

Year	Pop.	±%
1860	?	—
1870	?	—
1880	2,411	—
1900	?	—
1910	2,482	—

Year	Pop.	±%
1921	2,620	+5.6%
1931	3,191	+21.8%
1936	3,232	+1.3%
1951	3,111	−3.7%
1961	3,371	+8.4%

Year	Pop.	±%
1971	3,526	+4.6%
1981	3,460	−1.9%
1991	3,514	+1.6%
2001	3,700	+5.3%

Source: Data from ISTAT
