= Martell, South Tyrol =

Martell
- Comune
- Gemeinde Martell; Comune di Martello
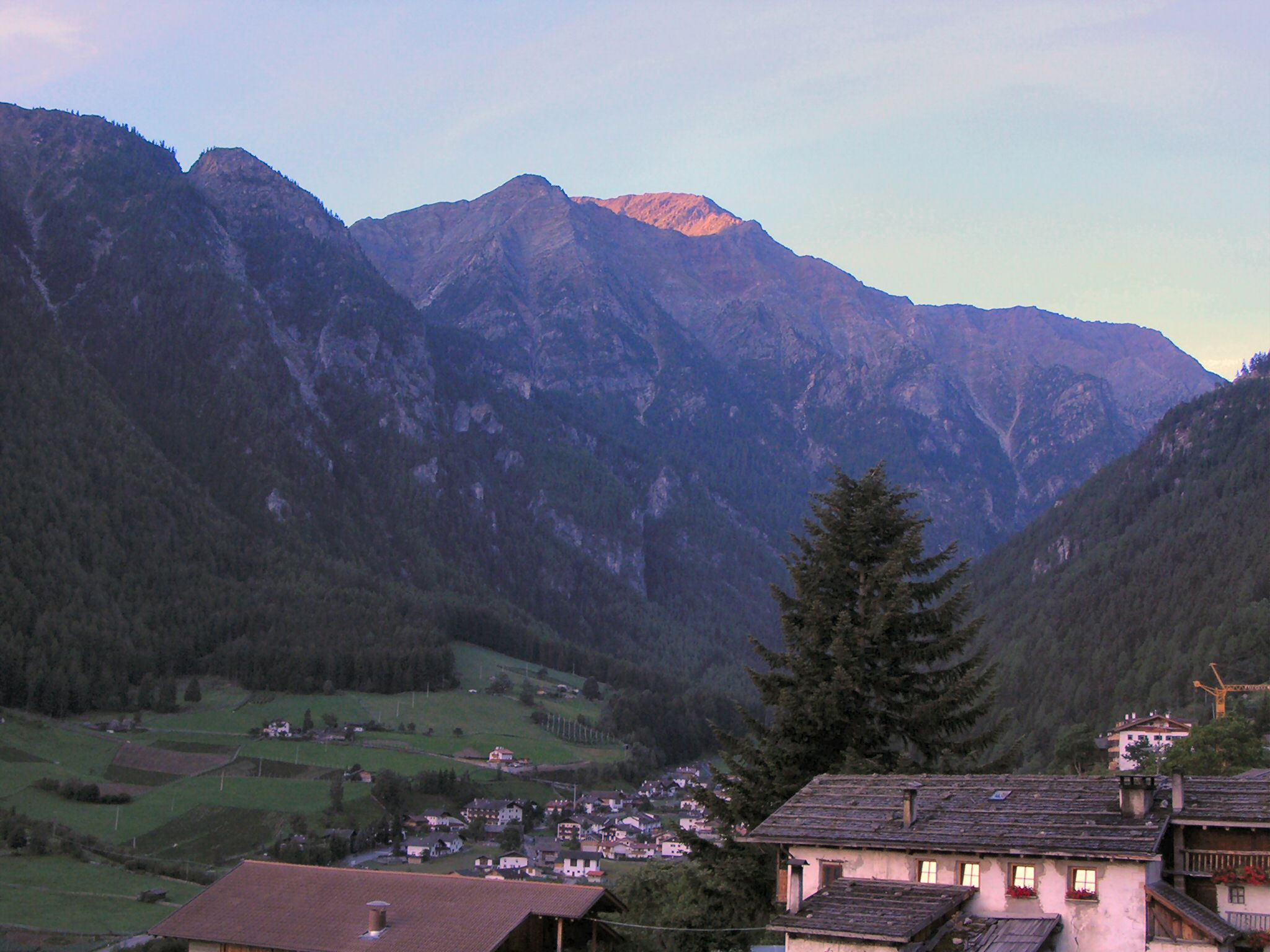
- View towards the village

- Location within Italy Location within Trentino-Alto Adige/Südtirol
- Coordinates: 46°33′N 10°47′E
- Country: Italy
- Region: Trentino-Alto Adige/Südtirol
- Province: South Tyrol (BZ)
- Frazioni: Ennetal (Val d'Enne), Ennewasser (Transacqua), Gand (Ganda), Meiern, Sonnenberg (Montesole)

Government
  - Mayor: Georg Altstätter

Area
  - Total: 143.7 km^{2} (55.5 sq mi)
- Elevation: 1,312 m (4,304 ft)

Population (Nov. 2010)
  - Total: 884
  - Density: 6.15/km^{2} (15.9/sq mi)
- Demonym(s): German: Marteller; Italian: martellesi
- Time zone: UTC+1 (CET)
  - Summer (DST): UTC+2 (CEST)
- Postal code: 39020
- Dialing code: 0473
- Website: Official website

Martell (German pronunciation: [marˈtɛl]; Italian: Martello [marˈtɛllo]) is a valley and comune (municipality) in South Tyrol in northern Italy. It is located in the Martell Valley of the 28.5-kilometre (17.7 mi) long river Plima, about 45 kilometres (28 mi) west of Bolzano. The commune reaches from an elevation of 957 metres (3,140 ft) up to the 3,757 metres (12,326 ft) of the Zufallspitze (Italian: Monte Cevedale) which towers over the southeastern end of the valley. It was the only comune in Italy without any native speakers of Italian until the 2024 Census.

== Geography ==
As of 30 November 2010, it had a population of 884 and an area of 143.7 square kilometres (55.5 mi^{2}).

Martell borders mainly to the municipality of Latsch at the bottom of the valley. Other neighbors based in the Vinschgau of the Adige are Stilfs, Laas and Schlanders. Ulten is in the neighboring valley to the East, while Peio, Rabbi and Valfurva are to the south.

=== Frazioni ===
Apart from the main village of Gand (Ganda), the municipality of Martell contains the frazioni (subdivisions, mainly villages and hamlets) of Ennetal (Val d'Enne), Ennewasser (Transacqua), Gand (Ganda), Meiern, and Sonnenberg (Montesole), as well as several farms and hotels.

== History ==
=== Coat-of-arms ===
The emblem shows two-headed sable eagle, with an or halo, placed on argent mountain and azure background. The two colors means that the municipality reaches a high altitude, up to the glaciers. According to legend, the right to adorn the city arms with the imperial eagle was recognized for the courage showed, from the residents, in the Battle of Schanzen nearby Colorano. The emblem was adopted in 1969.

== Society ==
=== Linguistic distribution ===
According to the 2024 census, 99.12% of the population speak German and 0.88% Italian as first language.

=== Demographic evolution ===
Historical population

Year	Pop.	±%
1860	?	—
1870	?	—
1880	940	—
1900	?	—
1910	957	—

Year	Pop.	±%
1921	929	−2.9%
1931	1,030	+10.9%
1936	1,080	+4.9%
1951	937	−13.2%
1961	948	+1.2%

Year	Pop.	±%
1971	944	−0.4%
1981	902	−4.4%
1991	845	−6.3%
2001	891	+5.4%

Source: Data from ISTAT
