= Schluderns =

- Comune
- Gemeinde Schluderns; Comune di Sluderno
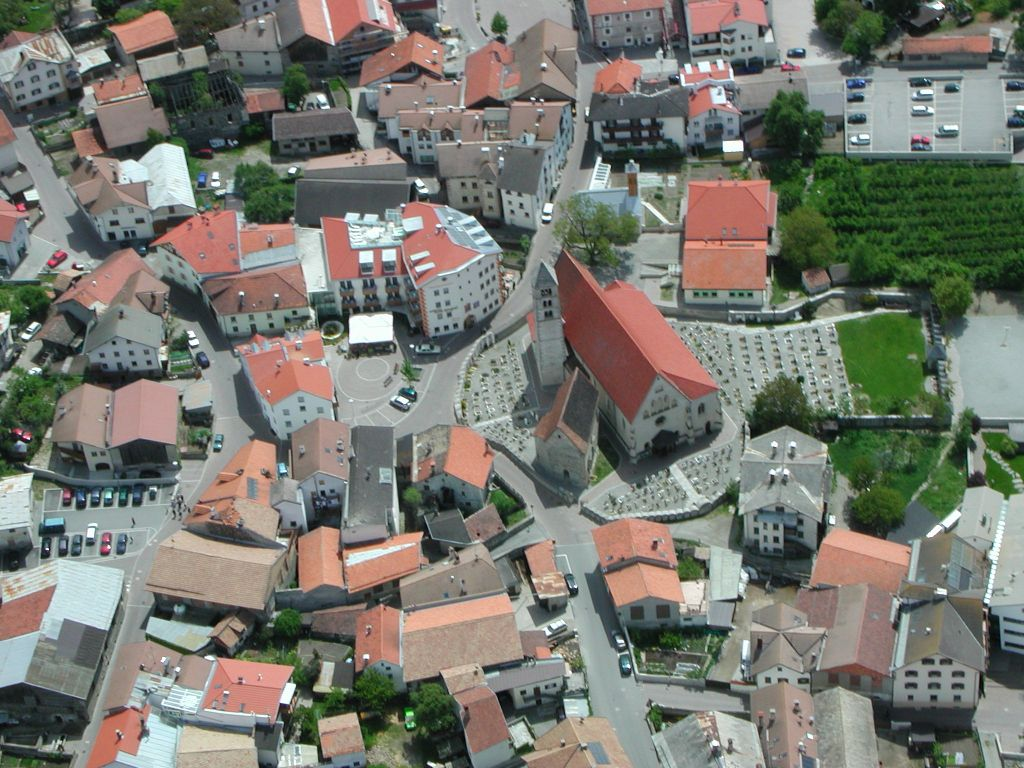
- Centre of the village

- Location within Italy Location within Trentino-Alto Adige/Südtirol
- Coordinates: 46°40′N 10°35′E
- Country: Italy
- Region: Trentino-Alto Adige/Südtirol
- Province: South Tyrol (BZ)
- Frazioni: Spondinig (Spondigna)

Government
  - Mayor: Heiko Hauser

Area
  - Total: 20.8 km^{2} (8.0 sq mi)
- Elevation: 921 m (3,022 ft)

Population (Nov. 2010)
  - Total: 1,831
  - Density: 88.0/km^{2} (228/sq mi)
- Demonym(s): German: Schludernser; Italian:sludernesi
- Time zone: UTC+1 (CET)
  - Summer (DST): UTC+2 (CEST)
- Postal code: 39020
- Dialing code: 0473
- Website: Official website

Schluderns (German pronunciation: [ʃluˈdɛrns]; Italian: Sluderno [zluˈdɛrno]) is a comune (municipality) and a village in South Tyrol in northern Italy, located about 60 km (37 mi) northwest of Bolzano.

== Geography ==
As of 30 November 2010, it had a population of 1,831 and an area of 20.8 km^{2} (8.0 mi^{2}).

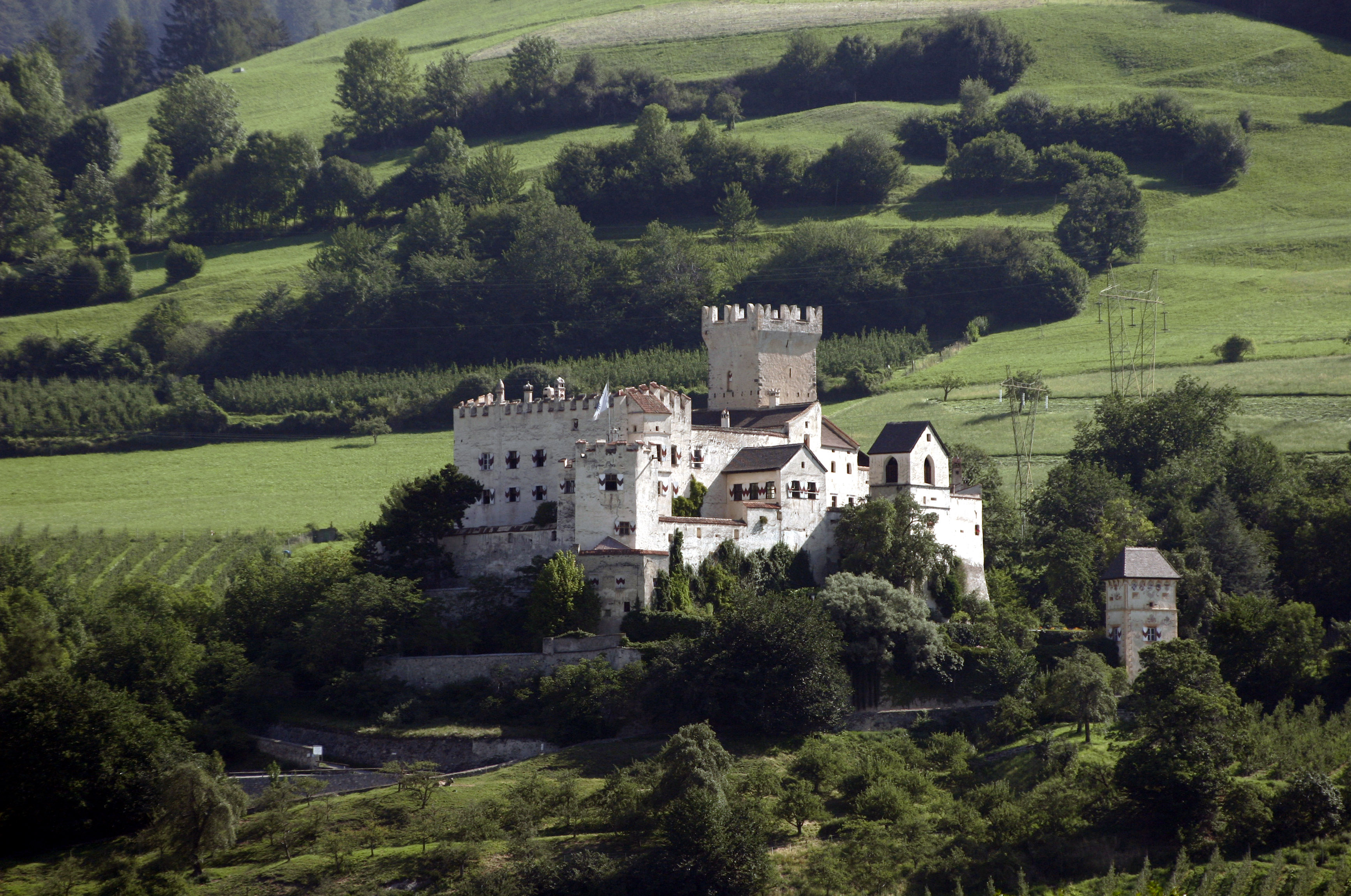
The Churburg

Above Schluderns is the famous castle Churburg from 1250.

The municipality contains the frazione (subdivision) Spondinig (Spondigna).

Schluderns borders the following municipalities: Glurns, Laas, Mals, and Prad am Stilfser Joch.

== History ==
=== Coat-of-arms ===
The shield is party per pale of argent and gules; the first part represents half sable wheel with azure torture blades, the second an or sheaf. The torture wheel is the insignia of St. Catherine patron saint of the village, the sheaf represent the cereal production in the municipality. The emblem was granted in 1967.

== Society ==
=== Linguistic distribution ===
According to the 2024 census, 96.66% of the population speak German, 3.22% Italian and 0.12% Ladin as first language.

=== Demographic evolution ===
Historical population

Year	Pop.	±%
1860	?	—
1870	?	—
1880	1,120	—
1900	?	—
1910	1,104	—

Year	Pop.	±%
1921	1,148	+4.0%
1931	1,139	−0.8%
1936	1,205	+5.8%
1951	1,270	+5.4%
1961	1,404	+10.6%

Year	Pop.	±%
1971	1,552	+10.5%
1981	1,633	+5.2%
1991	1,718	+5.2%
2001	1,848	+7.6%

Source: Data from ISTAT
