= Prad am Stilfser Joch =

- Comune
- Marktgemeinde Prad aSJ; Comune di Prato aS
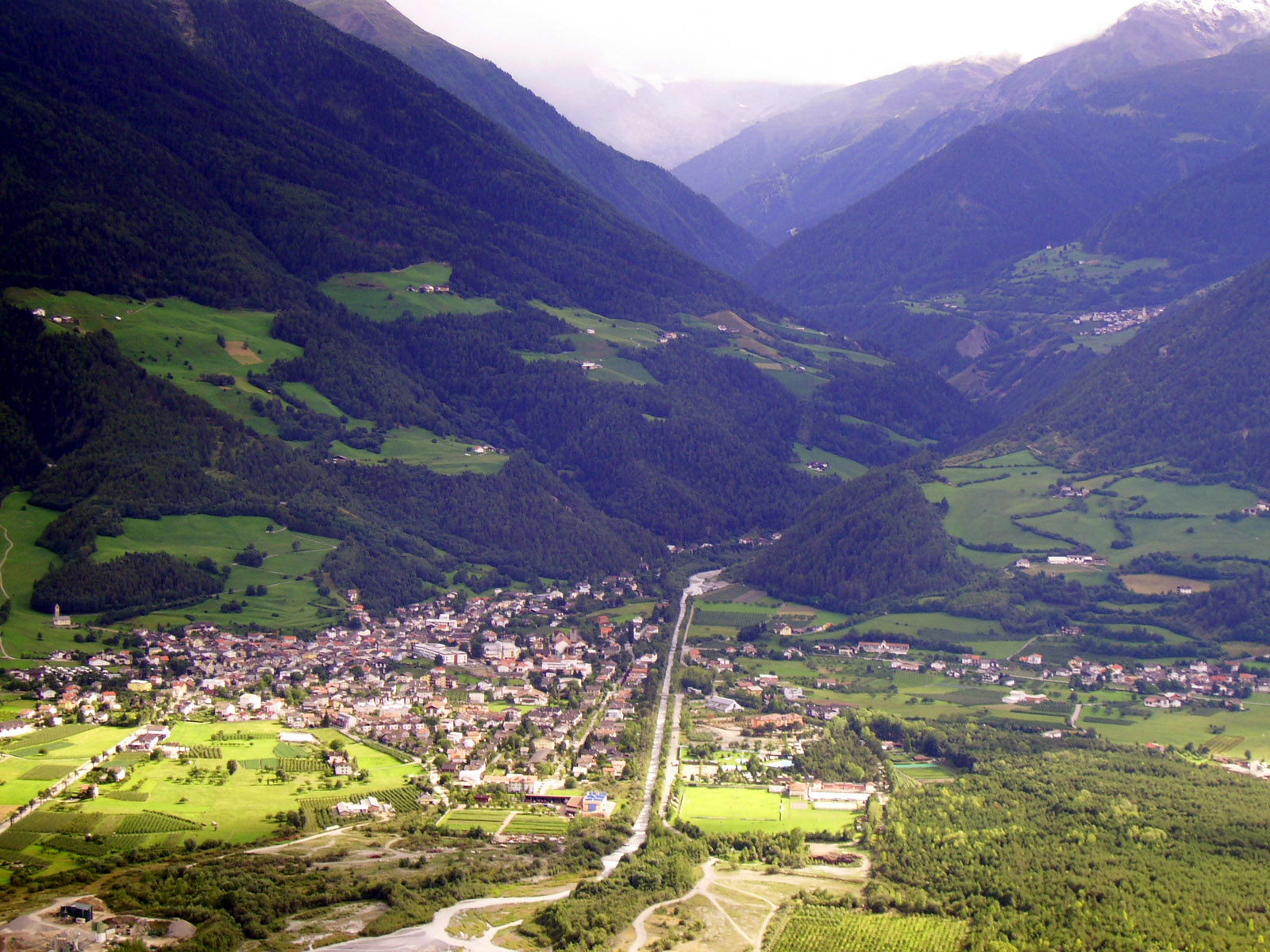
- The village viewed from north

- Coat of arms

- Location within Italy Location within Trentino-Alto Adige/Südtirol
- Coordinates: 46°37′N 10°36′E
- Country: Italy
- Region: Trentino-Alto Adige/Südtirol
- Province: South Tyrol (BZ)
- Frazioni: Lichtenberg (Montechiaro)

Government
  - Mayor: Rafael Alber

Area
  - Total: 51.4 km^{2} (19.8 sq mi)
- Elevation: 915 m (3,002 ft)

Population (Dec. 2015)
  - Total: 3,474
  - Density: 67.6/km^{2} (175/sq mi)
- Demonym(s): German: Prader; Italian: pratesi
- Time zone: UTC+1 (CET)
  - Summer (DST): UTC+2 (CEST)
- Postal code: 39026
- Dialing code: 0473
- Website: Official website

Prad am Stilfser Joch (German pronunciation: [praˑt am ˈʃtɪlfsɐ jɔx]; Italian: Prato allo Stelvio [ˈpraːto ˈallo ˈstɛlvjo]), often abbreviated to Prad, is a comune (municipality) and a village in South Tyrol in northern Italy, located about 60 kilometres (37 mi) west of the city of Bolzano, on the border with Switzerland, and near the Stelvio Pass.

== Geography ==
As of 31 December 2015, it had a population of 3,474 and an area of 51.4 square kilometres (19.8 mi^{2}).

The municipality contains the frazione (subdivision) Lichtenberg (Montechiaro).

Prad borders the following municipalities: Glurns, Laas, Schluderns, Stilfs, Taufers im Münstertal and Müstair (Switzerland).

== History ==
=== Coat-of-arms ===
The emblem shows three or ears of wheat, in a gules field on azure. The bottom is red. The wheat symbolizes the importance played by the cereal growing in the municipality. The emblem was adopted in 1969.

== Society ==
=== Linguistic distribution ===
According to the 2024 census, 95.60% of the population speak German, 4.28% Italian and 0.12% Ladin as first language.

=== Demographic evolution ===
Historical population

Year	Pop.	±%
1860	?	—
1870	?	—
1880	1,623	—
1900	?	—
1910	1,787	—

Year	Pop.	±%
1921	2,027	+13.4%
1931	1,987	−2.0%
1936	2,185	+10.0%
1951	2,198	+0.6%
1961	2,624	+19.4%

Year	Pop.	±%
1971	2,698	+2.8%
1981	2,808	+4.1%
1991	3,027	+7.8%
2001	3,140	+3.7%

Source: Data from ISTAT

== Sport ==
=== Notable people ===
- Gustav Thöni, alpine ski racer
