= Glurns =

- Comune
- Stadtgemeinde Glurns; Comune di Glorenza
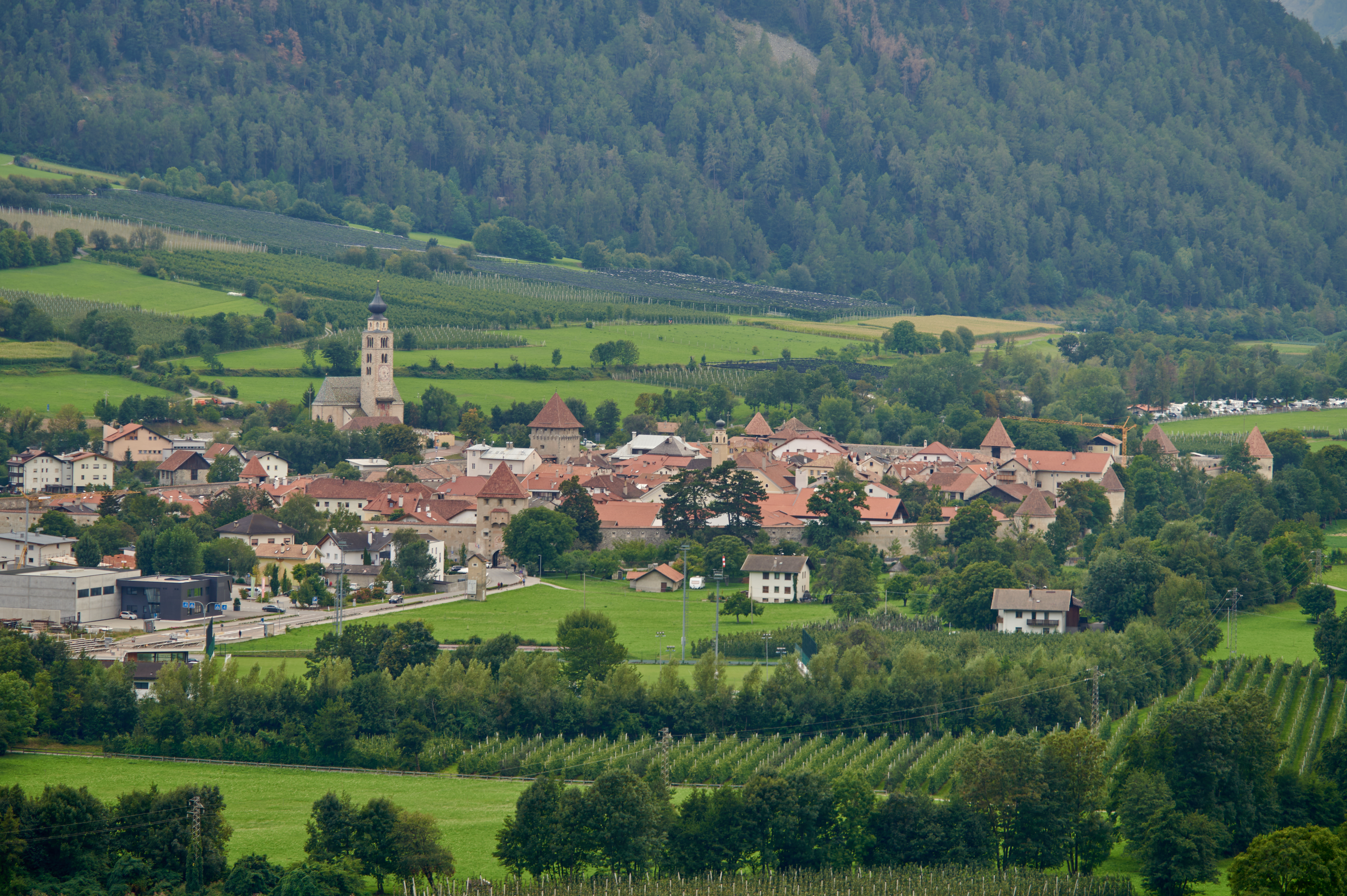
- View of Glurns

- Coat of arms

- Location within Italy Location within Trentino-Alto Adige/Südtirol
- Coordinates: 46°40′N 10°33′E
- Country: Italy
- Region: Trentino-Alto Adige/Südtirol
- Province: South Tyrol (BZ)

Government
  - Mayor: Erich Wallnöfer

Area
  - Total: 13.0 km^{2} (5.0 sq mi)
- Elevation: 907 m (2,976 ft)

Population (31-12-2025)
  - Total: 937
  - Density: 72.1/km^{2} (187/sq mi)
- Demonym(s): German:Glurnser; Italian: glorenzini
- Time zone: UTC+1 (CET)
  - Summer (DST): UTC+2 (CEST)
- Postal code: 39020
- Dialing code: 0473
- Website: Official website

Glurns (German pronunciation: [ˈɡlʊrns]; Italian: Glorenza [ɡloˈrɛntsa]; Romansh: Gluorn) is an urban comune (Stadt) in South Tyrol in northern Italy, located about 80 kilometres (50 mi) northwest of Bolzano. It is one of I Borghi più belli d'Italia ("The most beautiful villages of Italy").

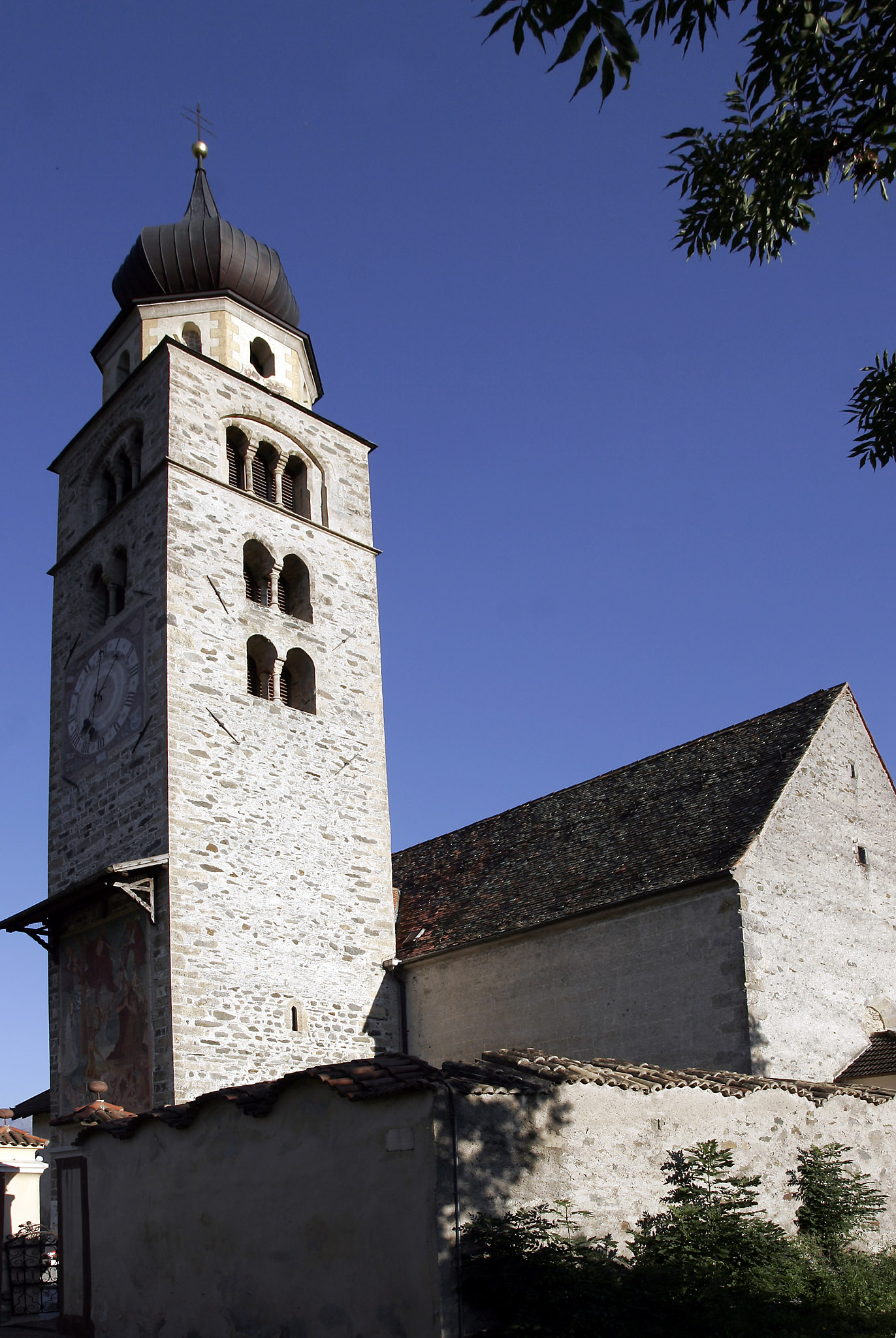
Saint Pancras's Church at the Tauferer Gate in the west of Glurns

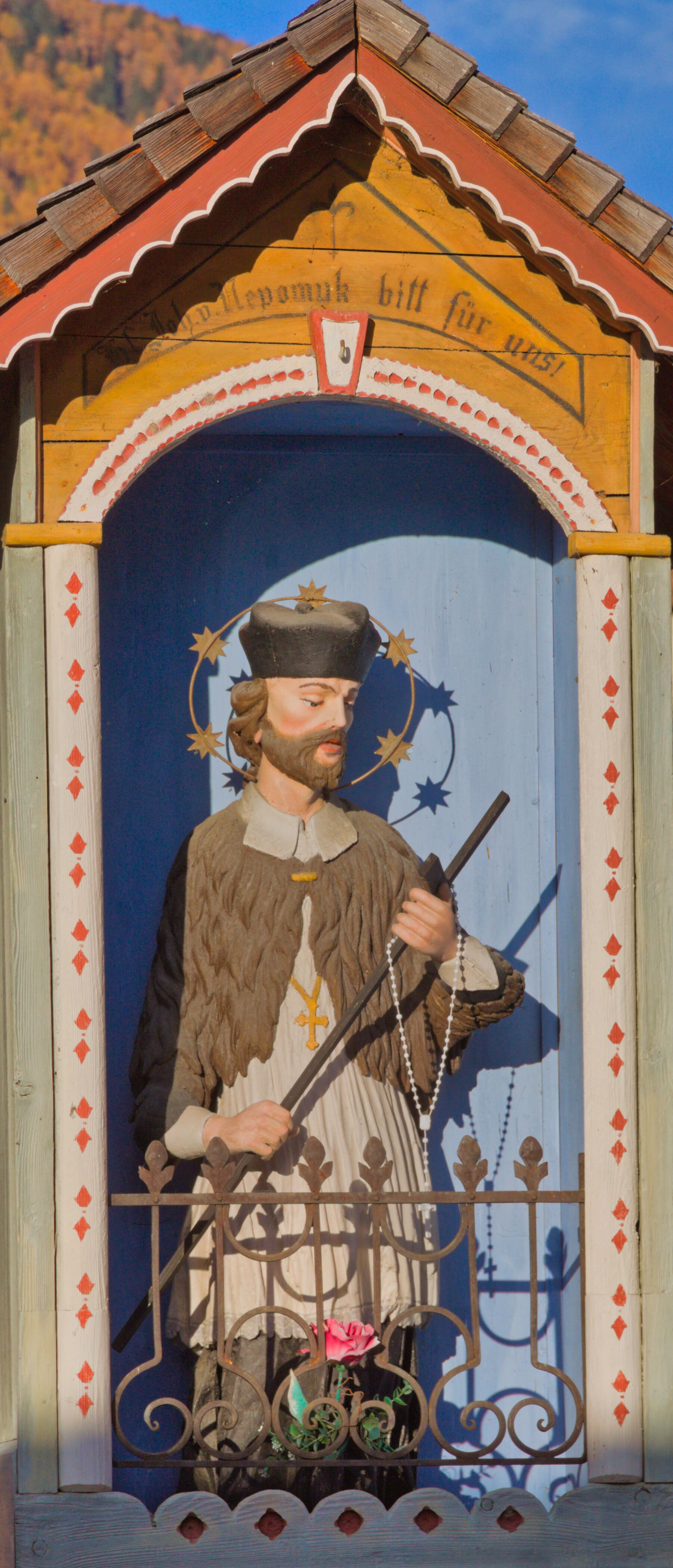
Saint John of Nepomuk over the Etsch River at the Tauferer Gate

== Geography ==
As of 30 November 2010, it had a population of 876 and an area of 13.0 square kilometres (5.0 mi^{2}).

Glurns borders the following municipalities: Mals, Prad am Stilfser Joch, Schluderns, and Taufers im Münstertal.

== History ==
=== Coat-of-arms ===
The shield is party per pale: the first part represents half Tyrolean Eagle on argent; the second is tierced per fess of sable, argent and gules. The eagle represents the membership of the village to the Tyrol, while the colors sable, argent and gules are those of the city. The emblem was granted in 1528 by Ferdinand I, Holy Roman Emperor.

== Society ==
=== Linguistic distribution ===
According to the 2024 census, 96.49% of the population speak German and 3.51% Italian as first language.

Language	2001	2011	2024
German	96.51%	96.13%	96.49%
Italian	3.37%	3.87%	3.51%
Ladin	0.12%	0.00%	0.00%

=== Demographic evolution ===
Historical population

Year	Pop.	±%
1860	?	—
1870	?	—
1880	649	—
1900	?	—
1910	710	—

Year	Pop.	±%
1921	779	+9.7%
1931	768	−1.4%
1936	732	−4.7%
1951	811	+10.8%
1961	792	−2.3%

Year	Pop.	±%
1971	717	−9.5%
1981	716	−0.1%
1991	795	+11.0%
2001	883	+11.1%

Source: Data from ISTAT
