= Schlanders =

- Comune
- Gemeinde Schlanders; Comune di Silandro
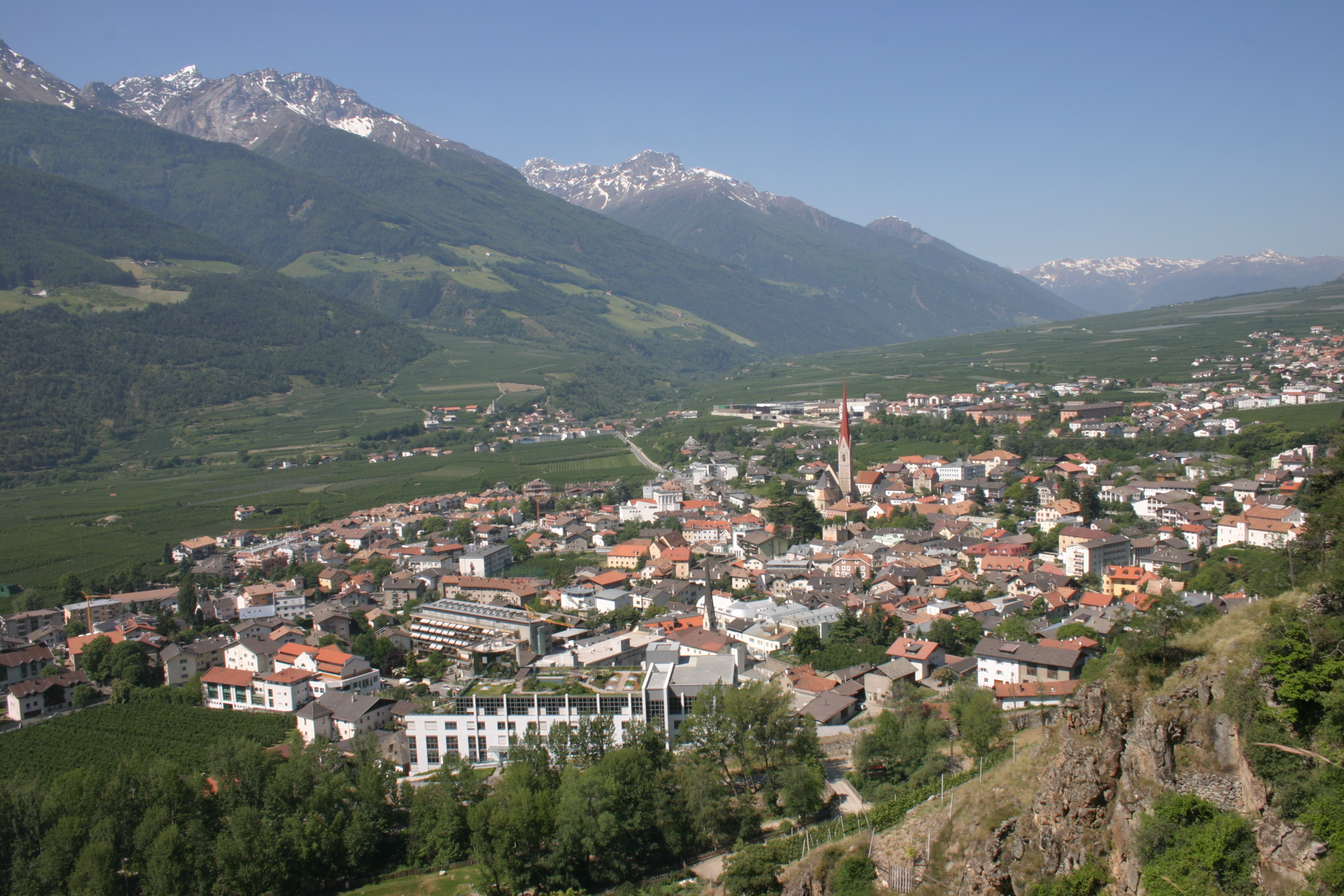
- Panorama of Schlanders

- Coat of arms

- Location within Italy Location within Trentino-Alto Adige/Südtirol
- Coordinates: 46°38′N 10°46′E
- Country: Italy
- Region: Trentino-Alto Adige/Südtirol
- Province: South Tyrol (BZ)
- Frazioni: Göflan (Covelano), Kortsch (Corzes), Nördersberg (Montetramontana), Sonnenberg (Montemezzodì), Vetzan (Vezzano)

Government
  - Mayor: Christine Kaaserer (SVP)

Area
  - Total: 115 km^{2} (44 sq mi)
- Elevation: 720 m (2,360 ft)

Population (31-12-2025)
  - Total: 6,424
  - Density: 55.9/km^{2} (145/sq mi)
- Demonym(s): German: Schlanderser; Italian: Silandresi
- Time zone: UTC+1 (CET)
  - Summer (DST): UTC+2 (CEST)
- Postal code: 39028
- Dialing code: 0473
- Website: Official website

Schlanders (German pronunciation: [ˈʃlandɐs]; Italian: Silandro [siˈlandro]) is a comune (municipality) and a village in South Tyrol in northern Italy, located about 50 kilometres (31 mi) west of the city of Bolzano.

== Overview ==
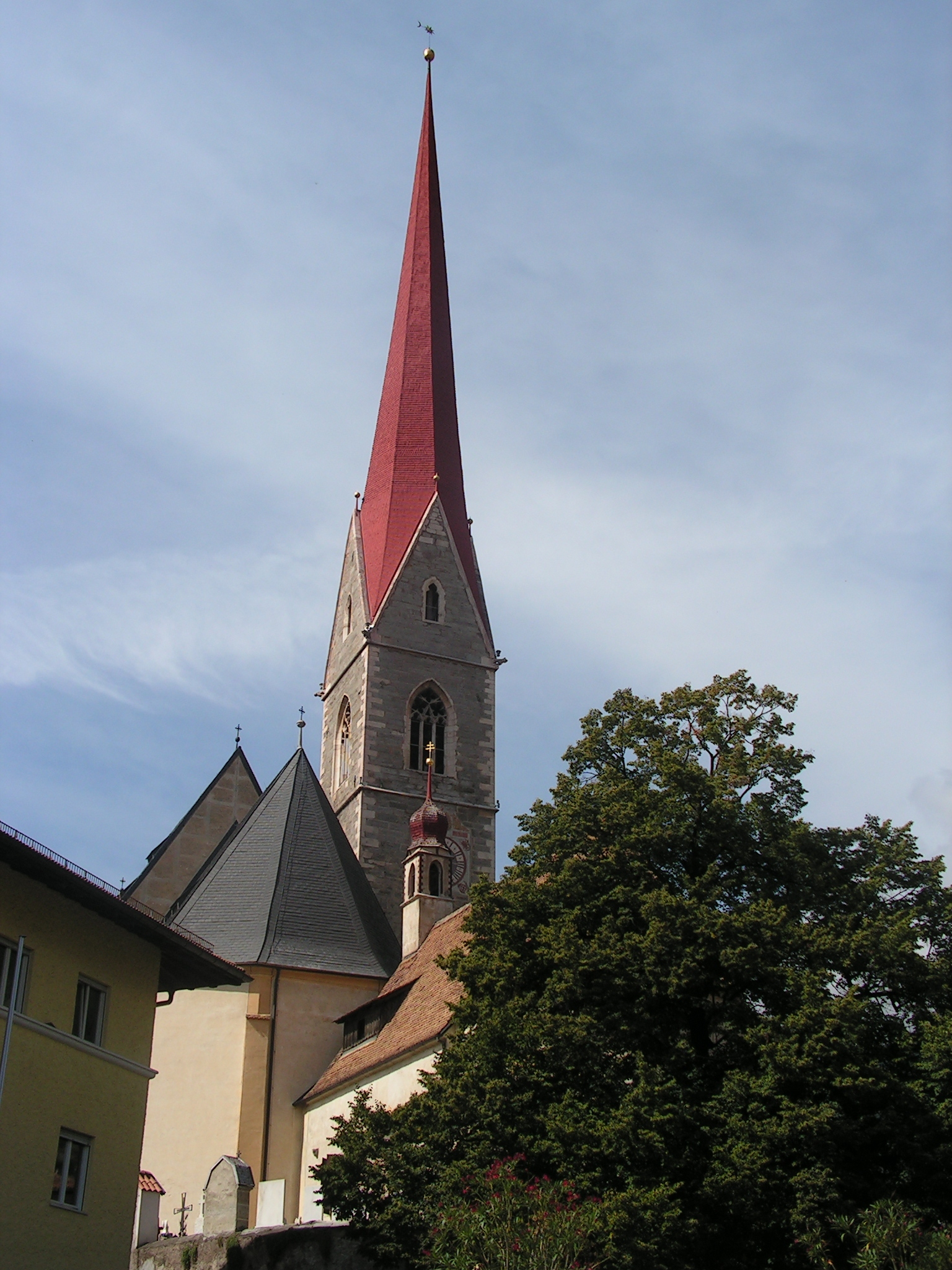
Parish church in Schlanders.

Schlanders borders the following municipalities: Latsch, Laas, Mals, Martell, Schnals.

Schlanders is well known for its church tower, 90.60 metres (297.2 ft) high, which is also the highest in South Tyrol. Another attraction is the renovated castle, which now serves as a civic hall (including a public library).

The locality was mentioned for the first time officially on 13 June 1077 in a deed of donation, where the Holy Roman Emperor Henry IV. handed over the town to Altwin, the Bishop of Brixen.

== Society ==
=== Linguistic distribution ===
According to the 2024 census, 93.54% of the population speak German, 6.42% Italian and 0.04% Ladin as first language.

== Traffic ==
The city of Schlanders is connected to the SS 38 motorway. The local train station is connected to the Vinschgau Railway. A local Bus connects the villages of Schlanders and Kortsch together and frequents in an intervall of every 30 minutes.

From the bus station near Karl-Schönherr Center buses depart to the surrounding villages and municipalities.

Since 2016 the Vinschgau Railways are getting modernized and connected to the electric grid as prior they were diesel engines.

== Notable people ==
- Marian Tumler (1887–1987) an Austrian theologian and 62nd Grand Master of the Teutonic Order from 1948–1970

Sport

- René Gusperti (born 1971) former swimmer, competed at the 1992 & 1996 Summer Olympics
- Nicole Gius (born 1980) alpine skier, competed at the 2002 & 2010 Winter Olympics
- Thomas Moriggl (born 1981) cross-country skier, competed at the 2010 Winter Olympics
- Stefan Thanei (born 1981) freestyle skier, competed in the 2018 Winter Olympics
- Barbara Moriggl (born 1982) cross-country skier and soldier
- Thomas Tragust (born 1986) ice-hockey goaltender
- Kevin Strobl (born 1997) badminton player

== Twin towns ==
- Trecenta, Italy
