= Side valley =

Valley with a tributary to a larger river

Side valleys and tributary valleys are valleys whose brooks or rivers flow into greater ones.

Upstream, the valleys can be classified in an increasing order which is equivalent to the usual orographic order: the tributaries are ordered from those nearest to the source of the river to those nearest to the mouth of the river. A confluence is where two or more tributaries or rivers flow together.

== Orographic order (e.g. Humber) ==
In the orographic classification (order of rivers) the tributary river has order n+1, if n describes the primary (or main) river. A river which flows directly into the ocean (e.g. the English rivers Thames or Humber) has the orographic order n=1, the River Ouse n=2, the Wharfe n=3 and so on.

== Geomorphology ==
The term "side valley" is used for higher order valleys near mountains (example above: the Pennines), as opposed to lower valleys that do not have a strong relief. This is because the "main stem river" (into which the secondary river flows) passes much more water than its tributaries and therefore

- has a lower current.
- has finer sediments that are deposited in a more flat manner.

The higher the order of a valley, the steeper the hillsides. Looking upstream, the steepest slopes are normally near the source of a brook (with the exception of very hard rocks in downstream direction).

=== Hanging valleys ===
The estuary of broad rivers lies in flat regions (river flats) rather than in regions with higher elevation. Therefore, the stream gradient of the tributary near its mouth is small (e.g. 1 m per km), but much more at waters of higher order (in the Alps up to 100 m per km). This is one reason for the large number of hanging valleys in some mountain ranges (e.g. Salzburg or Graubünden).

Glaciologic or geologic reasons:

- The glaciers of the ice age caused major erosion that resulted in many U-shaped "glacial valleys", especially at an altitude of 400–800 m which is typical for alpine main valleys.
- A valley shoulder appears at the place where the tributary flowed into the river before the glacial period. The side valley loses its height and develops into a hanging valley.
- In permeable rock like limestone) a side-valley becomes a gorge.
- In granite or other crystalline areas a waterfall may result.

These stages of valley genesis can be seen in higher mountain ranges - e.g. in the "young" Rocky Mountains, in the "old" ranges and fjords of Scandinavia, or in the Eastern Alps (Salzach or Inn valley).

Sandbanks often occur at reaches with slow current, especially near river banks. Studying the various gravel rock types is an excellent and cheap survey for a summarized geology of the rivers watershed (catchment area).

Generally the main river and tributary are easily identified, as one stream is both longer and carries more water than the other. Occasionally one stream is longer, but the other carries more water. This case offers no fixed rules, but the longer valley is usually chosen as the main valley. In Switzerland the long Alpine Rhine is chosen as the main stream, although the Aar carries more water. The Mississippi River carries more water while the Missouri River is much longer, but is still rated the tributary.

== Shape ==
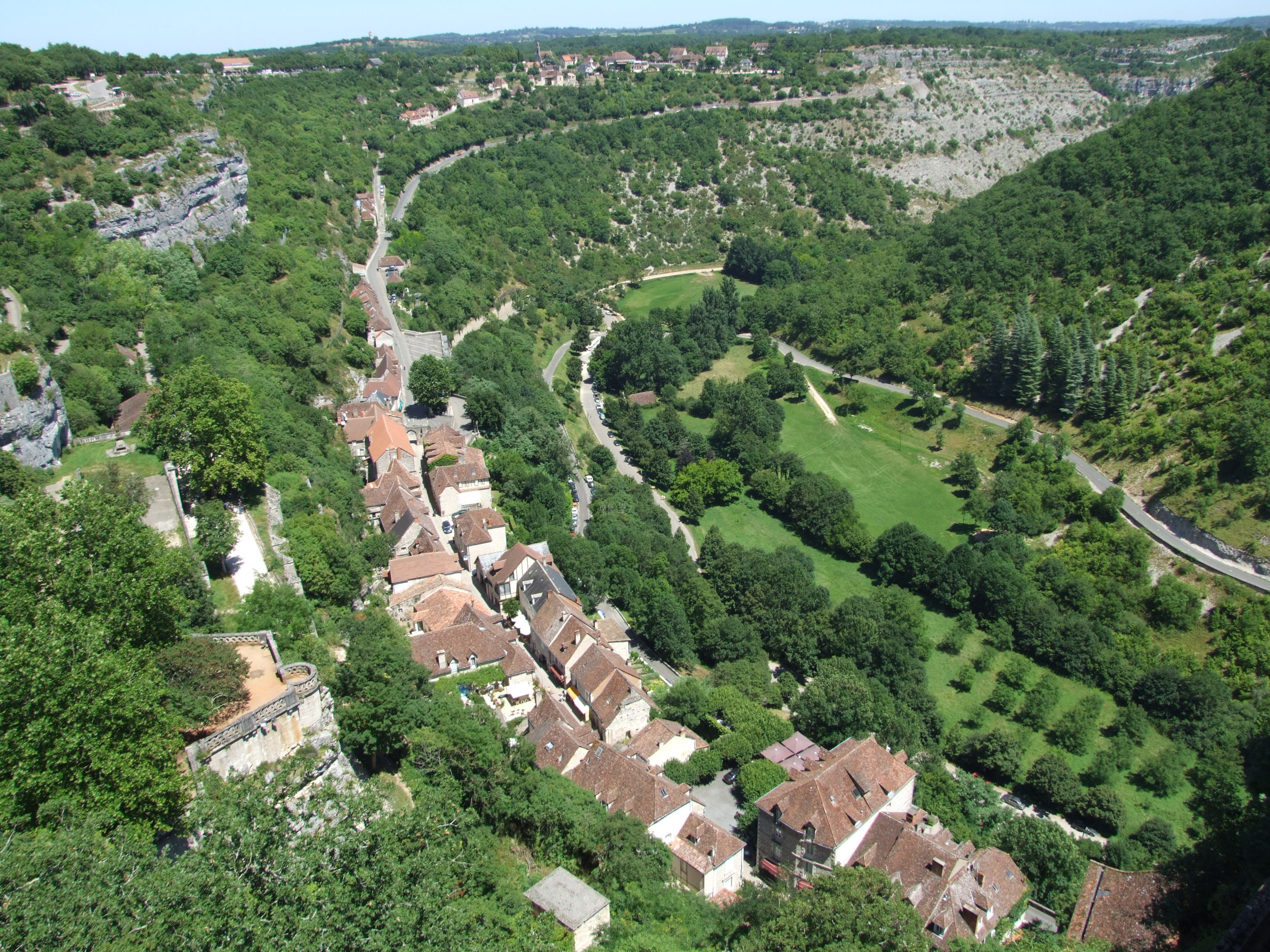
At Rocamadour (Lot, France) the traditional village clings to the slope, leaving the valley floor for agriculture

Whereas the valleys near river flats don't have special forms, the shape of alpine valleys depends much more from the former glaciology and of the rock type.

Side- or secondary valleys can be V-shaped or U-shaped. Valley floors vary - from just a few meters up to some 100 m (e.g. Bad Gastein or St. Moritz, where small towns have been developed instead of 1000 or 1500 m altitude).

Some valleys are stepped in longitudinal direction (German "Talstufe") which means that these zones show a quicker current than average. The brook digs its own canal and the eroded sediments are deposed at the end of each clammy, forming a series of local plains. They are an excellent sites for alpine agriculture or pastures.

== See also ==
- Valleys
- Stream
- Geography
- River
