= Stilfs =

- Comune
- Gemeinde Stilfs; Comune di Stelvio
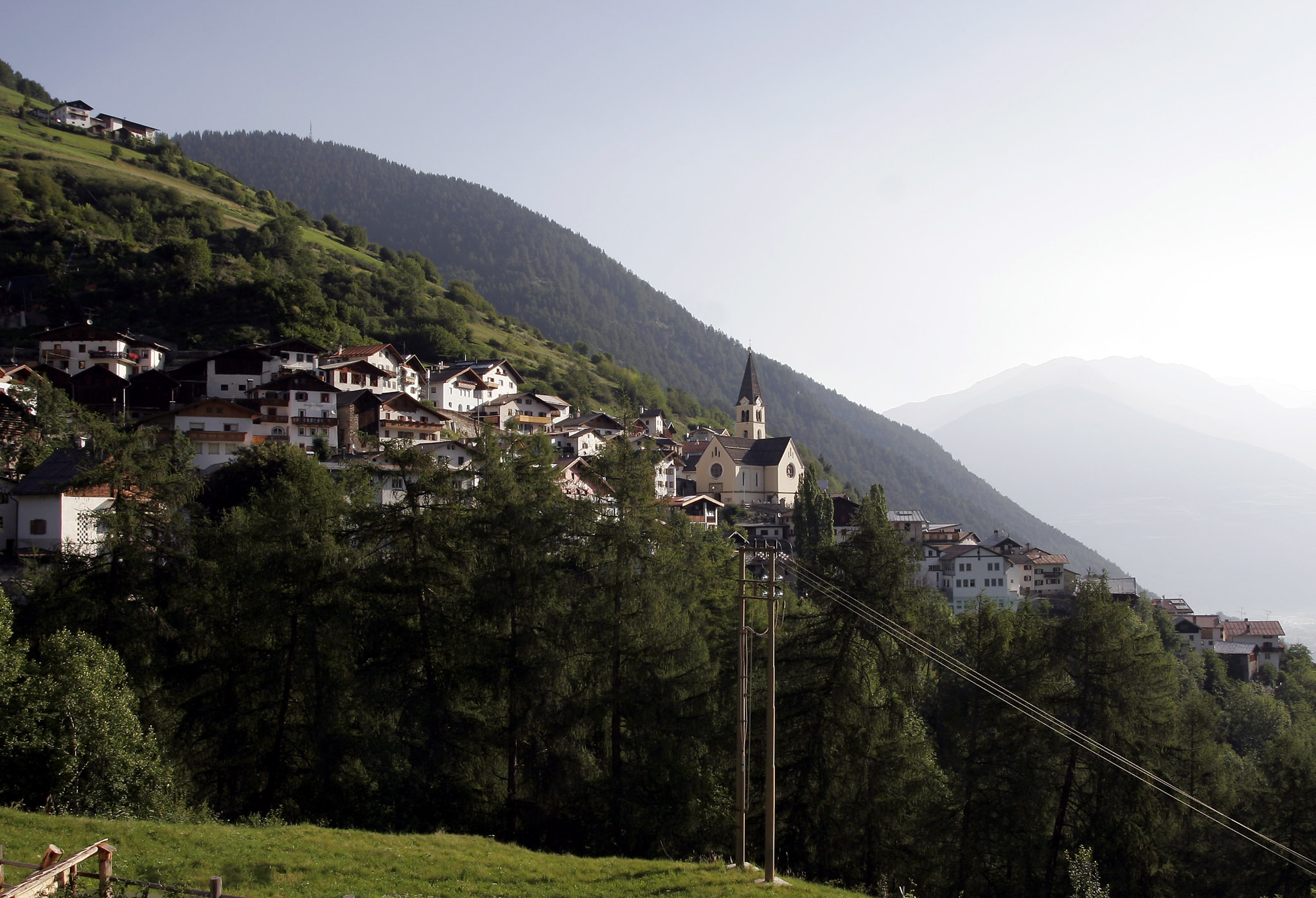
- View of Stilfs

- Coat of arms

- Location within Italy Location within Trentino-Alto Adige/Südtirol
- Coordinates: 46°36′N 10°33′E
- Country: Italy
- Region: Trentino-Alto Adige/Südtirol
- Province: South Tyrol (BZ)
- Frazioni: Sulden (Solda)

Government
  - Mayor: Samuel Marseiler

Area
  - Total: 140 km^{2} (54 sq mi)
- Elevation: 1,311 m (4,301 ft)

Population (Nov. 2010)
  - Total: 1,215
  - Density: 8.7/km^{2} (22/sq mi)
- Demonym: German: Stilfser
- Time zone: UTC+1 (CET)
  - Summer (DST): UTC+2 (CEST)
- Postal code: 39029
- Dialing code: 0473
- Website: Official website

Stilfs (German: [ʃtɪlfs]; Italian: Stelvio [ˈstelvjo, ˈstɛlvjo]) is a comune (municipality) in the province of South Tyrol in northern Italy. It is located near the northern ramp of the eponymous Stelvio Pass.

The municipality of Stilfs contains the frazioni (subdivisions, mainly villages and hamlets) of Sulden, Trafoi, Gomagoi.

== History ==
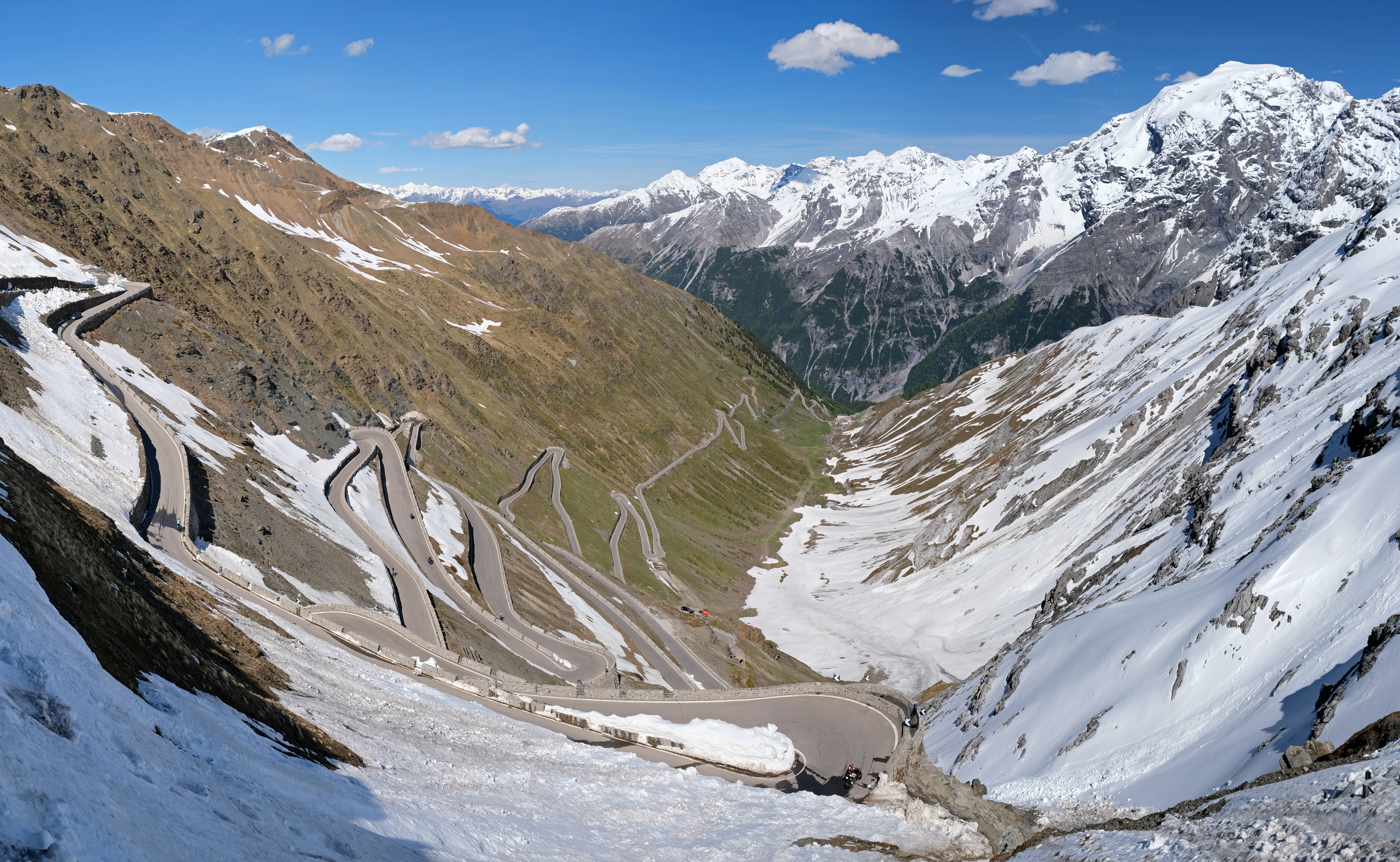
Part of the famous Stelvio Pass

=== Coat-of-arms ===
The emblem shows an or disc on sable background; inside the disc is a six leaves star of azure, vert and gules alternating. The star symbolizes an ancient nightly custom in wintertime. The emblem was granted in 1969.

== Society ==
=== Linguistic distribution ===
According to the 2024 census, 97.45% of the population speak German, 2.44% Italian and 0.10% Ladin as first language.

=== Demographic evolution ===
Historical population

| Year | Pop. | ±% |
|---|---|---|
| 1860 | ? | — |
| 1870 | ? | — |
| 1880 | 1,324 | — |
| 1900 | ? | — |
| 1910 | 1,467 | — |
| 1921 | 1,526 | +4.0% |

| Year | Pop. | ±% |
|---|---|---|
| 1931 | 1,590 | +4.2% |
| 1936 | 1,673 | +5.2% |
| 1951 | 1,381 | −17.5% |
| 1961 | 1,558 | +12.8% |
| 1971 | 1,456 | −6.5% |
| 1981 | 1,405 | −3.5% |

| Year | Pop. | ±% |
|---|---|---|
| 1991 | 1,323 | −5.8% |
| 2001 | 1,310 | −1.0% |
| 2011 | 1,190 | −9.2% |
| 2021 | 1,139 | −4.3% |

Source: Data from ISTAT

== Notable people ==
- Roland Thöni (born in Trafoi, 1951–2021) was an Alpine ski racer. Competed in the downhill at the 1976 Winter Olympics, won by Franz Klammer.

== See also ==
- Stelvio National Park
