= Resia =

Resia may refer to:

== Locations in northern Italy ==
=== South Tyrol ===
- Resia, a frazione (subdivision) of the village Graun im Vinschgau
- Reschen Pass (Italian: Passo di Resia), a border pass connecting Italy and Austria
- Reschensee, (Italian: Lago di Resia), a reservoir near Reschen Pass

=== Province of Udine ===
- Resia, Friuli, a town and commune (municipality)
- Resia Valley, an Alpine glacial valley near Moggio Udinese

== Other ==
- Resia (plant), a genus in subfamily Gesnerioideae
- Resian dialect, a Slovene dialect spoken in the Resia valley
- Resia gens, a family of ancient Rome
