= Karlinbach =

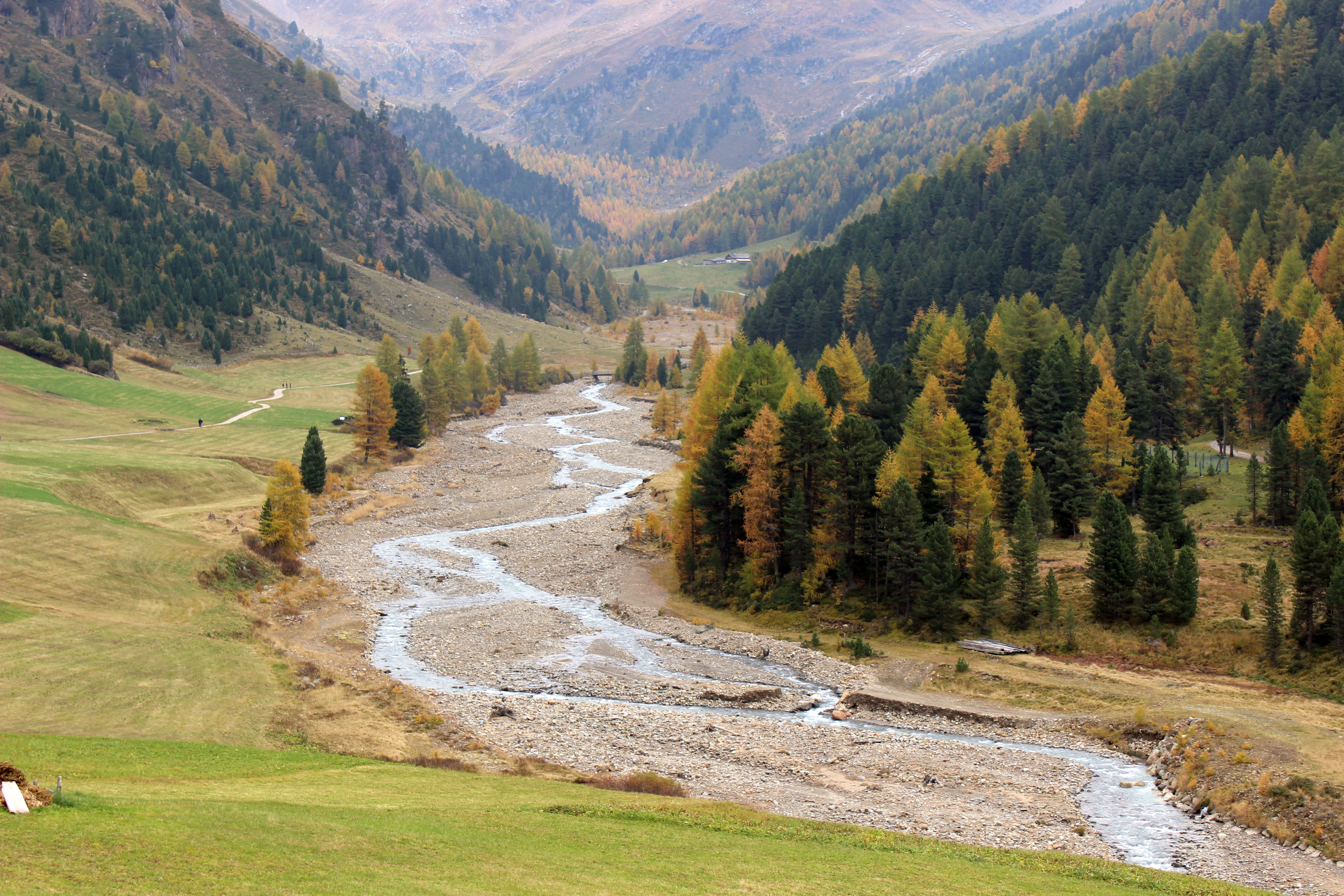

Location
- Country: Italy

Physical characteristics
- Source
  - elevation: 3,736 m (12,257 ft)
- Mouth: Reschensee
  - coordinates: 46.8042°N 10.5398°E
  - elevation: 1,474 m (4,836 ft)
- Length: 19.6 km (12.2 mi)
- Basin size: 114 km^{2} (44 sq mi)

Basin features
- Progression: Reschensee→ Adige→ Adriatic Sea

The Karlinbach (Italian: Rio Carlino) is a stream in South Tyrol, Italy. It originates from the Weißkugel mountain in the Ötztal Alps mountain range.It flows into the Lake Reschen, near the village of Graun im Vinschgau.
