= Curon =

Italian television series

- Genre: Supernatural drama; Thriller; Horror
- Created by: Ezio Abbate; Ivano Fachin; Giovanni Galassi; Tommaso Matano
- Based on: an original idea by Ivano Fachin; Giovanni Galassi; Tommaso Matano
- Written by: Ezio Abbate; Ivano Fachin; Giovanni Galassi; Tommaso Matano
- Directed by: Fabio Mollo; Lyda Patitucci
- Starring: Valeria Bilello; Luca Lionello; (See full cast list)
- Composers: Giorgio Giampà; Carmelo Emanuele Patti; Ginevra Nervi
- Country of origin: Italy
- Original languages: Italian; German
- No. of episodes: 7

Production
- Executive producers: Daniel Campos Pavoncelli; Alessandro Mascheroni
- Producers: Fabrizio Donvito; Marco Cohen; Benedetto Habib
- Production locations: Trentino-South Tyrol, Italy
- Cinematography: Benjamin Maier
- Editors: Filippo Montemurro; Mirko Platania; Luca Montanari
- Running time: 41-51 minutes
- Production company: Indiana Production

Original release
- Network: Netflix
- Release: 10 June 2020

Curon is an Italian supernatural drama television series created by Ezio Abbate, Ivano Fachin, Giovanni Galassi, and Tommaso Matano for Netflix. The series stars Valeria Bilello and Luca Lionello.

The first seven-episode season premiered on 10 June 2020.

== Premise ==
The twins Daria (Margherita Morchio) and Mauro Raina (Federico Russo) return to their mother's eerie small hometown, Curon in Northern Italy, South Tyrol. Seventeen years ago, their mother Anna Raina (Valeria Bilello) fled the town, pregnant with the twins, after her own mother's tragic death. The three arrive at the family hotel, which has been closed ever since. After a cold welcome, it becomes apparent that no one wants Anna and her kids back in town, not even Anna's own father, Thomas (Luca Lionello). In fact, the twins do not want to stay either, they are eager to move back to their home in Milan.

After some troubles on their first school day, Daria befriends the teacher's daughter Micki Asper (Juju Di Domenico) and they kiss after a late-night party by the town's lake. When Micki's brother, Giulio (Giulio Brizzi) hears the rumors that his sister could be a lesbian, he cannot believe this and confronts Daria and Micki. Meanwhile, Micki's and Giulio's father, Albert Asper (Alessandro Tedeschi) also seems to have some unresolved history with Anna Raina. Micki struggles with the rejection from her former friend group and the trust breach of her former best friend Lukas (Luca Castellano).

Daria and Mauro discover that Anna had returned because of an incessant nightmare about the circumstances of her mother's death. In the nightmare, Anna saw someone, who looked identical to her, shoot her mother and then turn to point the gun at her. Everything leads them to the town's lake. Anna disappears, and the twins begin searching for her and after a few troubling events they finally solve the mystery of their grandmother's death and uncover the secret surrounding the town's lake.

== Cast and characters ==
- Valeria Bilello (dub.: Gilli Messer) as Anna Raina, a woman who returns to her home town Curon after 17 years
- Luca Lionello (dub.: Dennis Kleinman) as Thomas Raina, Anna's father who owns an old hotel in Curon
- Federico Russo (dub.: Ryan Cargil) as Mauro Raina, Anna's hearing-impaired son and Daria's twin brother.
- Margherita Morchio (dub.: Deneen Melody) as Daria Raina, Anna's daughter and Mauro's twin sister
- Anna Ferzetti (dub.: Kit Sheehan) as Klara Asper, a teacher
- Alessandro Tedeschi (dub.: Matthew Rudd) as Albert Asper, Klara's husband and a forest ranger
- Juju Di Domenico (dub.: Elise Luthman) as Micki Asper, Daria's new love interest
- Giulio Brizzi (dub.: Oscar Fabela) as Giulio Asper, Micki's brother and Davide's friend
- Max Malatesta (dub.: Christopher W. Jones) as Michael Ober, a local who hates the Rainas
- Luca Castellano (dub.: Brett Calo) as Lukas, Micki's best friend
- Sebastiano Fumagalli (dub.: Ryan Colt Levy) as Davide, Giulio's friend
- Mihaela Dorlan as young Anna Raina, who appears in flashbacks
- Katja Lechthaler as Lili Raina, Anna's dead mother who appears in a flashback
- Salvatore De Santis (dub.: Rick Zieff) as Berger, a friend of Thomas'
- Giuseppe Gandini (dub.: Michael Pizzuto) as Matteo, Lukas' father
- Filippo Marsili as young Albert Asper, who appears in flashbacks
- Giulio Cristini as Pietro, Mauro and Daria's father
- Christoph Hülsen as Daniel, a bartender
- Maximilian Dirr as Don Luigi, the priest of Curon
- Markus Candela as young Mauro
- Greta Sacco
- Federica Pocaterra as young Klara, who appears in a flashback

== Episodes ==
No. overall	No. in season	Italian title English title	Directed by	Written by	Original release date
1	1	"Il lago nero" "The Black Lake"	Fabio Mollo	Series Bible by : Ezio Abbate & Ivano Fachin & Giovanni Galassi & Tommaso Matano (Note: In collaboration with Ilaria Castiglioni.); Teleplay by : Ezio Abbate	10 June 2020
After 17 years of absence, Anna Raina returns to her hometown, Curon, with her 17-year-old twin children Mauro and Daria. Anna fled Curon after witnessing the murder of her mother Lili by an identical copy of herself, but her constant nightmares about the tragedy prompted her return. Anna's father Thomas, who owns an old hotel, is troubled by his daughter's return and asks her to leave with the twins, claiming they are not safe there, but she ignores his request. Mauro and Daria enroll in the local high school and meet the siblings Micki and Giulio Asper. Mauro doesn't fit in due to his introverted personality, but the outspoken Daria gains the respect of her classmates, especially Micki, who invites the twins to a party. Mauro wants to find his drone, which he tracked to Lake Resia, but Daria convinces him to go to the party first. Micki and Daria get drunk and kiss at the party, while an irritated Mauro leaves for the lake. The twins both fall into the lake's waters, Mauro while reaching for his drone and Daria while drinking with Micki, Giulio, and Davide. Back at the hotel, Mauro finds a woman who looks like his mother locked in the attic, but she knocks him out and escapes once he undoes her chains. The next morning, Thomas enters Anna's room and finds it empty.
2	2	"Il giorno successivo" "The Day After"	Fabio Mollo	Series Bible by : Ezio Abbate & Ivano Fachin & Giovanni Galassi & Tommaso Matano; Teleplay by : Giovanni Galassi	10 June 2020
The twins wake up to find that their mother is gone. Mauro tells Daria about the woman in the attic, but she dismisses it, thinking he saw delusions due to the alcohol. Thomas tells the twins that Anna went to the mountains to be by herself and will be back, and Mauro accuses Thomas of hiding the woman from them. Thomas also says he was drunk and takes the twins to the attic, emptied of the furniture that was present the night before, to back up his assertion. Thomas ventures into the woods to find Anna with his friend, Berger, while Micki tells Lukas about the kiss with Daria and swears him to secrecy. Jealous of Daria, Lukas reveals Micki's secret to another student, who spreads it around the school before Giulio hears about it. Micki invites the twins to her house for lunch but only Daria goes, and she says that she only kissed Micki because she was drunk. Daria also gets a close look at the dynamics between Albert, the patriarch, and the rest of the Asper family. Mauro, refusing to accept Thomas' explanation about the woman in the room and his mother's disappearance, investigates the mysteries of Curon with Lukas' prompting. Lukas hears the bell tower's nonexistent bells ring while a person who looks just like Lukas emerges from the lake.
3	3	"L'assassino" "The Killer"	Fabio Mollo	Series Bible by : Ezio Abbate & Ivano Fachin & Giovanni Galassi & Tommaso Matano; Teleplay by : Ivano Fachin	10 June 2020
Mauro and Daria, who now believes something is amiss with her mother, take Thomas' truck and search for Anna. Anna's return causes tensions in the Spear family and brings back memories for Albert, who reminisces on their relationship as teenagers. Micki and Giulio fight about their parents, and Giulio says he is leaving town when he turns 18. Thomas enlists a reluctant Albert in his search for the twins. Mauro and Daria make it to the Valley of the Sun, but just as they reach an abandoned cabin, Thomas and Albert arrive and take them back to the hotel. Thomas tells the twins that the person Mauro saw in the attic was only a shadow and that the family is cursed. Thomas finds Anna's car at the bottom of a ravine, but there are no bodies inside, and he suspects Albert kidnapped Anna and her doppelgänger. Daria rejects Micki's advances and they stop speaking. Micki reconciles with Giulio but refuses to accept Lukas' apology. Daria wants to let the police handle Anna's disappearance but changes her mind when Mauro reveals that he found Anna's earring at the cabin. They go back to the cabin and find large amounts of blood, pictures of Anna and Albert as teenagers, and the other earring. Albert arrives with a rifle and finds the twins, but Thomas saves them and Albert is arrested. Lukas is killed by his doppelgänger, who then takes over his identity.
4	4	"I padri" "The Fathers"	Fabio Mollo	Series Bible by : Ezio Abbate & Ivano Fachin & Giovanni Galassi & Tommaso Matano; Teleplay by : Tommaso Matano	10 June 2020
Tensions are high during the Fire Festival. Albert is arrested in connection with Anna's disappearance but questions remain, especially for Mauro, who refuses to accept that Anna is dead. Thomas decides to be transparent with Daria and Mauro. The twins' father, Pietro, arrives in town, but Thomas doesn't trust him. Lukas' doppelgänger kills his father's cat and threatens Davide. Giulio convinces Micki that they should find out the truth about their father while showing her his greenhouse full of weed, which he believes will be their ticket out of town. Micki and Giulio go to the cabin and are convinced of Albert's guilt, but Klara defends him. The siblings then go to the bar and see Lukas' doppelgänger hanging out with Davide and all of their friends. Lukas' doppelgänger convinces Micki to go on a walk with him. Daria and Mauro meet with Pietro, who tells them that he is the reason why Mauro lost part of his hearing. Mauro runs out of the bar and Daria follows, but she loses sight of him and bumps into Giulio, who can't find Micki. Daria and Giulio bond while looking for Mauro. Lukas' doppelgänger assaults Micki when she rejects him, but Mauro knocks him out. Micki tells Mauro that Lukas was afraid of being killed by his doppelgänger and that she believes the doppelgänger succeeded, and Mauro realizes that Anna also has a doppelgänger. Lukas' doppelgänger sets fire to the hotel. Mauro, Daria, and Thomas run outside and see Anna through the flames; Thomas collapses.
5	5	"La maledizione" "The Curse"	Lyda Patitucci	Series Bible by : Ezio Abbate & Ivano Fachin & Giovanni Galassi & Tommaso Matano; Teleplay by : Ezio Abbate	10 June 2020
A flashback reveals that after Anna left 17 years ago, Albert was killed by his doppelgänger, and Klara kisses him despite witnessing the incident. Anna is back, but Mauro wonders whether it is actually her doppelgänger. Albert is released from jail, but Micki and Giulio doubt his innocence. Lukas' doppelgänger corners Micki in the bathroom at school. Klara notices that Thomas' wolf is terrified of Anna, and she suggests to Albert that the wolf knew it was not the real Anna. Pietro comes back to the hotel, but Anna threatens him and the twins arrive as he pushes her into the wall. They rally around her but when she puts hazelnuts in their food and Mauro has a severe allergic reaction, he and Daria are suspicious. Giulio and Micki go to Lukas' house to confront him, but their dog, Atlas, discovers the real Lukas' body buried in the yard. Anna's doppelgänger confronts the real Anna, who is in chains but had escaped earlier and put the hazelnuts in the cake to alert her kids about the double. The real Anna realizes that her doppelgänger killed Anna's mother and Thomas sent her away to keep her safe. Anna's doppelgänger shoots Pietro. The twins visit Thomas in the hospital, and he tells them about the Curon curse. They realize Anna's doppelgänger is in the hotel, and Thomas says they should pretend nothing is wrong around her. Klara sees Albert's doppelgänger kiss Anna and hears the bells, while Mauro, Daria, Micki, and Giulio decide to look for their real parents.
6	6	"I lupi" "The Wolves"	Lyda Patitucci	Series Bible by : Ezio Abbate & Ivano Fachin & Giovanni Galassi & Tommaso Matano; Teleplay by : Ivano Fachin & Giovanni Galassi & Tommaso Matano	10 June 2020
Daria and Mauro trap Anna's doppelgänger in the attic. Klara tells Micki and Giulio that she loves them, then tells Albert that her doppelgänger is coming. Thomas returns home from the hospital but lets Anna's doppelgänger live instead of killing her. The Spear siblings and the Raina twins begin their journey to the Plain of the Dead, a World War II bunker, but are intercepted by Lukas' doppelgänger. He ties each pair of siblings to a tree and is about to set them on fire when Thomas' friend, Berger, distracts Lukas' doppelgänger long enough to kill him and untie the kids before he, too, dies of his wounds. Albert's doppelgänger kills Klara's doppelgänger, then tells Klara that he doesn't love her and is leaving to rescue Anna's doppelgänger. Klara is cleaning the blood off the floor when another doppelgänger arrives, and Klara surrenders after her doppelgänger promises she will protect the kids. Daria and Giulio act on their feelings for each other while sheltering for the night. Albert's doppelgänger rescues Anna's doppelgänger and they lock Thomas in the attic with his wolf before going to find their kids.
7	7	"Il labirinto" "The Maze"	Lyda Patitucci	Series Bible by : Ezio Abbate & Ivano Fachin & Giovanni Galassi & Tommaso Matano; Teleplay by : Ezio Abbate	10 June 2020
Daria and Mauro resume their journey with Micki and Giulio to the Plain of the Dead so that they can find their real parents before the doppelgängers. They fight because Micki is jealous of Daria and Giulio, but Mauro convinces her to let it go. Thomas survives the night and restrains the wolf long enough to open the attic door, and he frees the wolf. Thomas is about to depart for the Plain of the Dead when Klara's doppelgänger arrives, and he reluctantly allows her to join him. Anna and Albert's doppelgängers arrive at the Plain of the Dead and find that the real Anna has escaped. The kids arrive shortly after but split up when Daria hears her mother's voice and Mauro goes to look for Daria. Each twin finds their mother, but they are unable to tell which one is the real Anna. Micki and Giulio find their father, who seizes their rifle, before finding the twins and the two Annas in a room. Albert's doppelgänger kills one of the Annas, tells Micki and Giulio that the real Albert is dead, and kills himself. Klara's doppelgänger and Thomas arrive, and the surviving Anna runs away, making everyone realize that Albert's doppelgänger killed the real Anna. Mauro chases after Anna's doppelgänger with the rifle and she almost falls off a cliff, but Daria grabs her hand at the last minute. Mauro and Thomas persuade Daria to let go of Anna's doppelgänger, which she does, letting Anna's doppelgänger fall to her death. Klara's doppelgänger takes Micki and Giulio to the real Klara's grave and reveals that their father is Albert's doppelgänger; Micki hears the bells. Mauro and Daria are in Thomas' room at the hotel when Daria hears the bells. Micki and Daria's doppelgängers try to emerge from the lake, but it is frozen over.

== Production ==
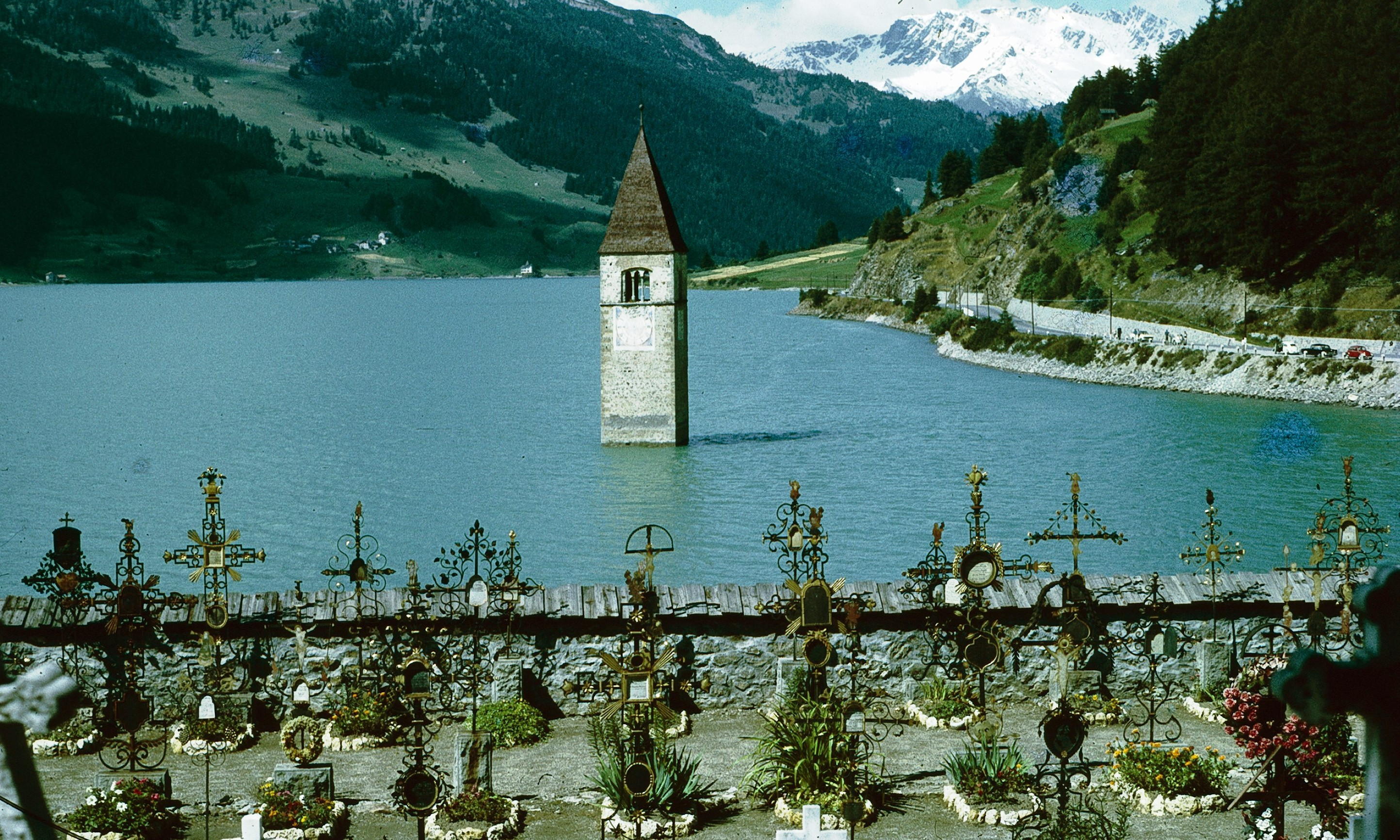
The ancient half-submerged bell-tower in the lake Lago di Resia (Reschensee in German), which borders Curon Venosta, is featured in the TV series.

The series was shot in and around the town Curon Venosta (Graun im Vinschgau in German) in Northern Italy and in other locations of the Trentino-South Tyrol region.

== Reception ==
Curon received generally average reviews. On Rotten Tomatoes, the first season holds a 63% rating based on 8 reviews, with an average score of 6.5/10. Melissa Camacho of Common Sense Media gave the show 3 out of 5 stars, stating: "Curon is a decent pick for anyone looking for a solid supernatural teen drama, but will leave you feeling disappointed if you want something more spine-chilling." Joe Keller of Decider.com wrote: "Curon has its issues, but the two teen leads and their polar-opposites dynamic is compelling enough for us to keep watching." Ronak Kotecha of The Times of India gave it 3.5 out of 5 stars, saying: "The show establishes its context very clearly right from the beginning and hooks you as the 17-year-old twins Daria and Mauro begin their life in Curon. Their first day at school and all the subsequent scenes are quite refreshing as they focus on the skewed relationship between the teenagers ... Also, the show concurrently explores relationships among the youngsters, who make new friends and foes and among the adults, who share a mysterious past. The makers blend it well with the show’s suspenseful narrative that focuses on the curse of Curon. Its core idea of discovering one’s true self is told in a supernatural way, which is only believable if you can digest a heavy dose of suspended reality."
