= Adige =

Major river in Southern Europe

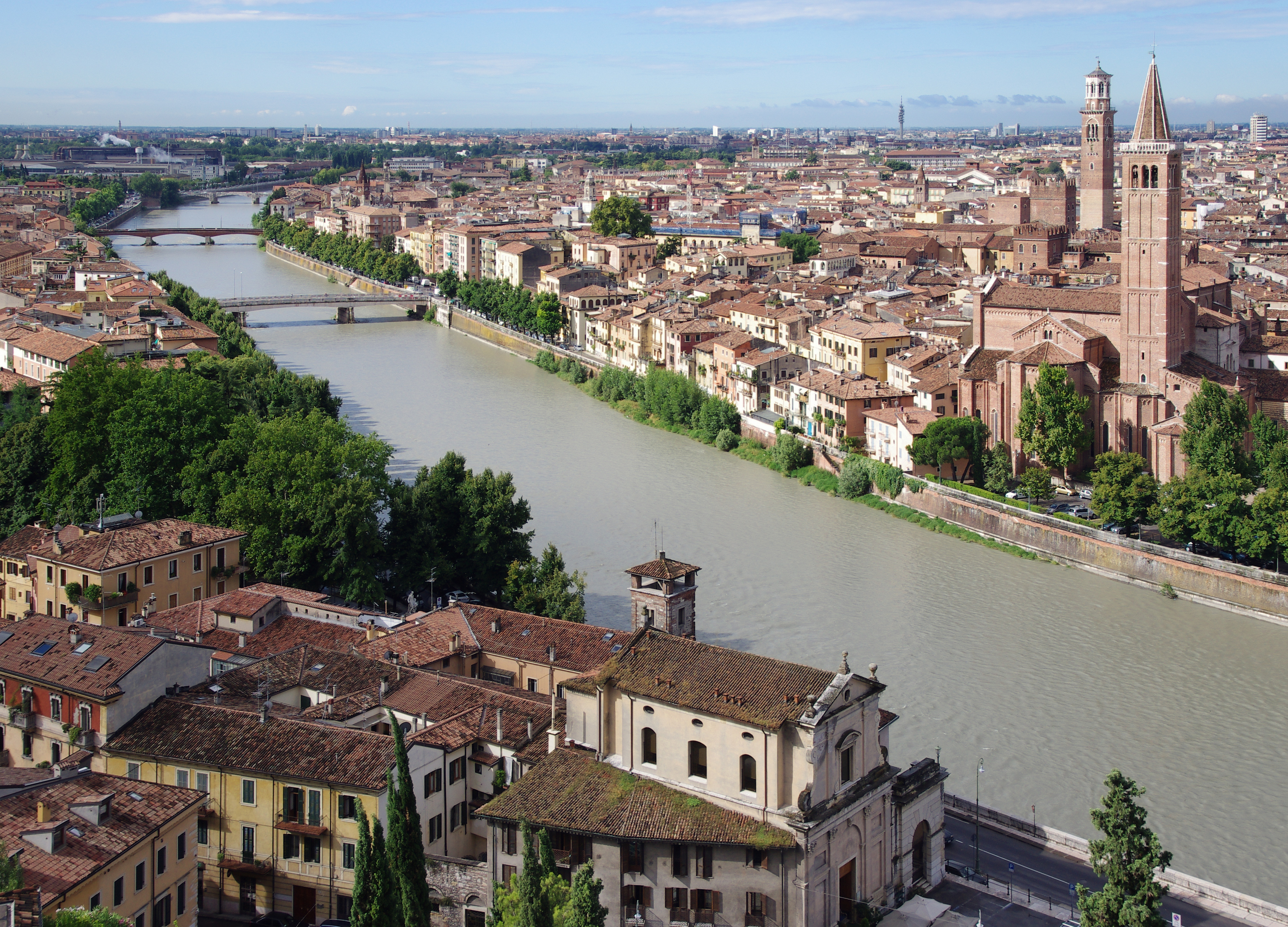
- The Adige in Verona

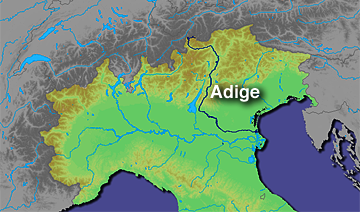
- Map of the Adige River
- Etymology: Latin Athesis, from Celtic *yt-ese, "the water"
- Native name: Etsch (German); Àdexe (Venetian); Adige (Italian); Adisch (Romansh); Adesc (Ladin)

Location
- Country: Italy

Physical characteristics
- Source: Reschen Pass
  - location: Graun im Vinschgau, South Tyrol, Italy
  - coordinates: 46°50′04″N 10°30′53″E
  - elevation: 1,520 m (4,990 ft)
- Mouth: Adriatic Sea
  - location: Italy
  - coordinates: 45°8′59″N 12°19′13″E
  - elevation: 0 m (0 ft)
- Length: 410 km (250 mi)
- Basin size: 12,100 km^{2} (4,700 sq mi)
- Discharge
  - average: 235 m^{3}/s (8,300 cu ft/s)

The Adige (Note: Italian: [ˈaːdidʒe]; German: Etsch [ɛtʃ]; Venetian: Àdexe [ˈadeze]; Romansh: Adisch [ɐˈdiːʃ]; Ladin: Adesc [ˈa(ː)deʃ, ˈadəʃ]; Latin: Athesis; Ancient Greek: Ἄθεσις, romanized: Áthesis, or Ἄταγις, Átagis.) is the second-longest river in Italy, after the Po. It rises near the Reschen Pass in the Vinschgau in the province of South Tyrol, near the Italian border with Austria and Switzerland, and flows 410 kilometres (250 mi) through most of northeastern Italy to the Adriatic Sea.

The name of the river is of unknown origin. Nineteenth-century theories, such as a derivation from the Proto-Celtic *yt-ese 'the water', and alleged to be cognate with the River Tees in England (anciently Athesis, Teesa), have never been accepted by Celtic onomasts and are now completely obsolete.

== Description ==
The river source is near the Reschen Pass (1,504 metres (4,934 ft)) close to the borders with Austria and Switzerland above the Inn Valley. It flows through the artificial alpine Lake Reschen. The lake is known for the church tower that marks the site of the former village of Alt Graun ("Old Graun"); it was evacuated and flooded in 1953 after the dam was finished. Near Glurns, the Rom River joins from the Swiss Val Müstair.

The Adige runs eastward through the Vinschgau to Merano, where it is met by the Passer river from the north. The section between Merano and Bolzano is called Etschtal, meaning Adige Valley. South of Bolzano, the river is joined by the Eisack and turns south through a valley which has always been one of the major routes through the Alps, connecting the Reschen and the Brenner passes, at 1,370 metres (4,490 ft) considered the easiest of the main Alpine passes.

The Chiusa di Salorno narrows at Salorno and marks the southernmost part of the predominantly German-speaking province of South Tyrol. The Adige was mentioned in the "Lied der Deutschen" of 1841 as the southern border of the German language area. As of 2011 62% of Salorno speaks Italian and 37% speaks German. In 1922 Germany adopted the song as its national anthem, although by that time Italy had taken control of all of the Adige.

Near Trento, the Avisio, Noce, and Fersina rivers join. The Adige crosses Trentino and later Veneto, flowing past the town of Rovereto, the Lagarina Valley, the cities of Verona and Rovigo and the north-eastern part of the Po Plain into the Adriatic Sea. The Adige and the Po run parallel in the river delta without properly joining.

The Adige is connected to Lake Garda by the Mori–Torbole tunnel, an artificial underground canal built for flood prevention.

== Tributaries ==
The following rivers are tributaries to the Adige River (from source to mouth):

Name of River	Place of Confluence	Province	Side of Confluence
Karlinbach, Rojenbach, Punibach	Reschensee	Bolzano	Left
Rambach	1.5 km west of Spondinig	Bolzano	Right
Suldenbach	Spondinig	Bolzano	Right
Plima	Latsch	Bolzano	Right
Schnalser Bach	Naturns	Bolzano	Left
Passer	Merano	Bolzano	Left
Falschauer	Lana	Bolzano	Right
Eisack	Bolzano	Bolzano	Right
Rio Lusina	2 km north of Neumarkt	Bolzano	Left
Noce	1 km downstream from Zambana	Trento	Right
Avisio	Lavis	Trento	Left
Fersina	Trento	Trento	Left
Leno	Rovereto	Trento	Left
Canale Biffis	2.5 km upstream from Verona	Verona	Right
Torrente Alpone	Albaredo d'Adige	Verona	Left
Adriatic Sea	Rosolina	Rovigo	Rivermouth

== Ecology ==
=== Fauna ===
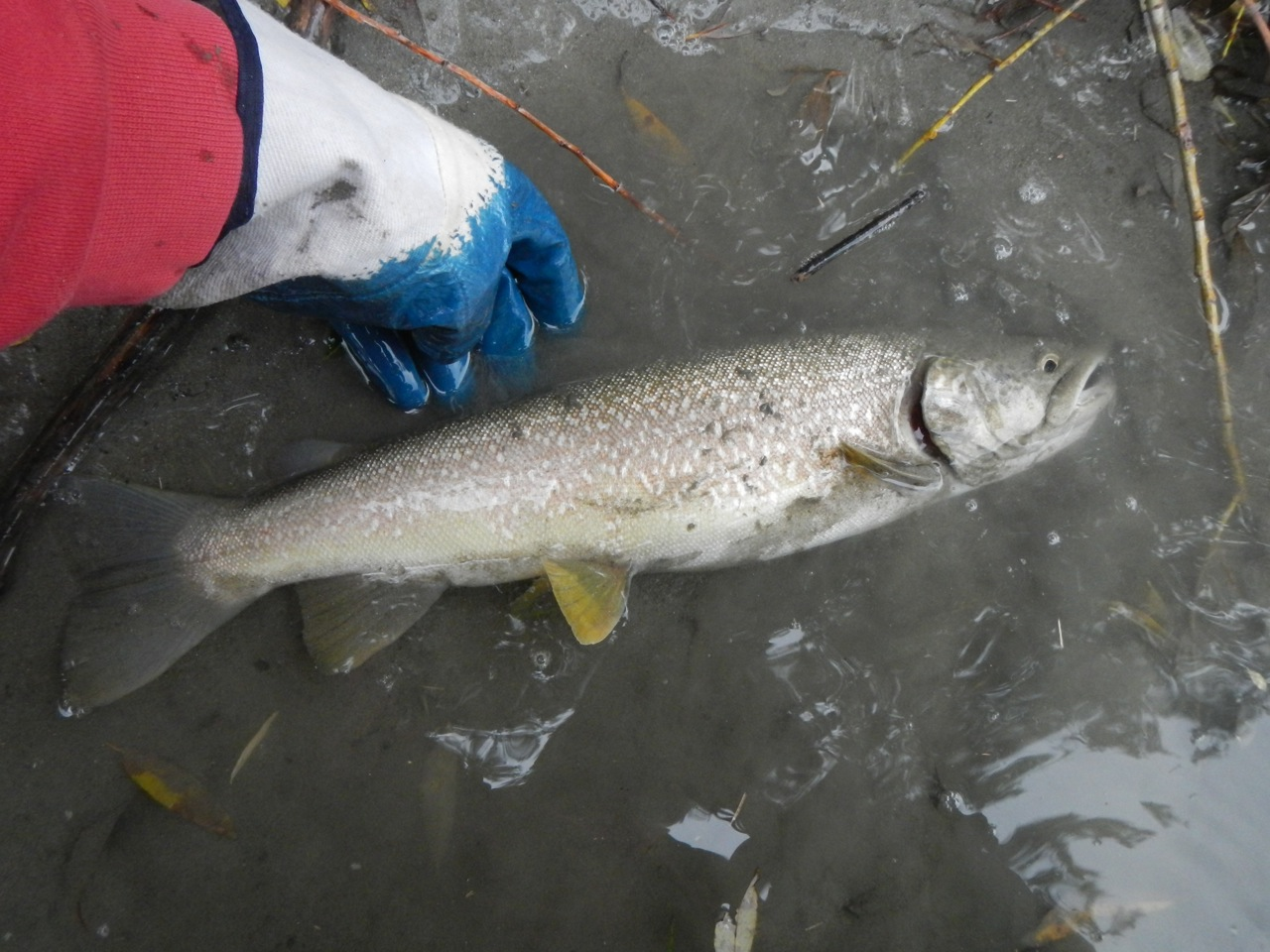

The Adige is home to the marble trout (Salmo marmoratus), but at far lower populations than in the past. Fish stocking is one of the most significant causes of the sharp reduction in the original (indigenous) fish population of this subspecies. It will spawn with and interbreed with brown trout, which are regularly stocked in the river and its tributaries.

== Gallery ==
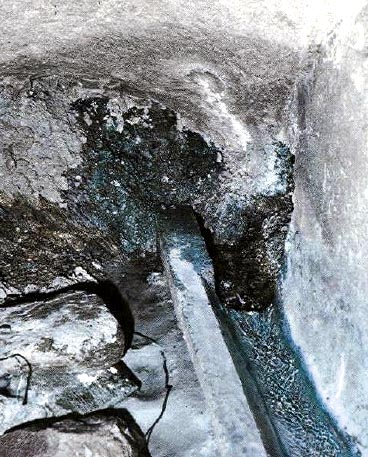
The true source of the Adige inside a bunker of the Alpine Wall

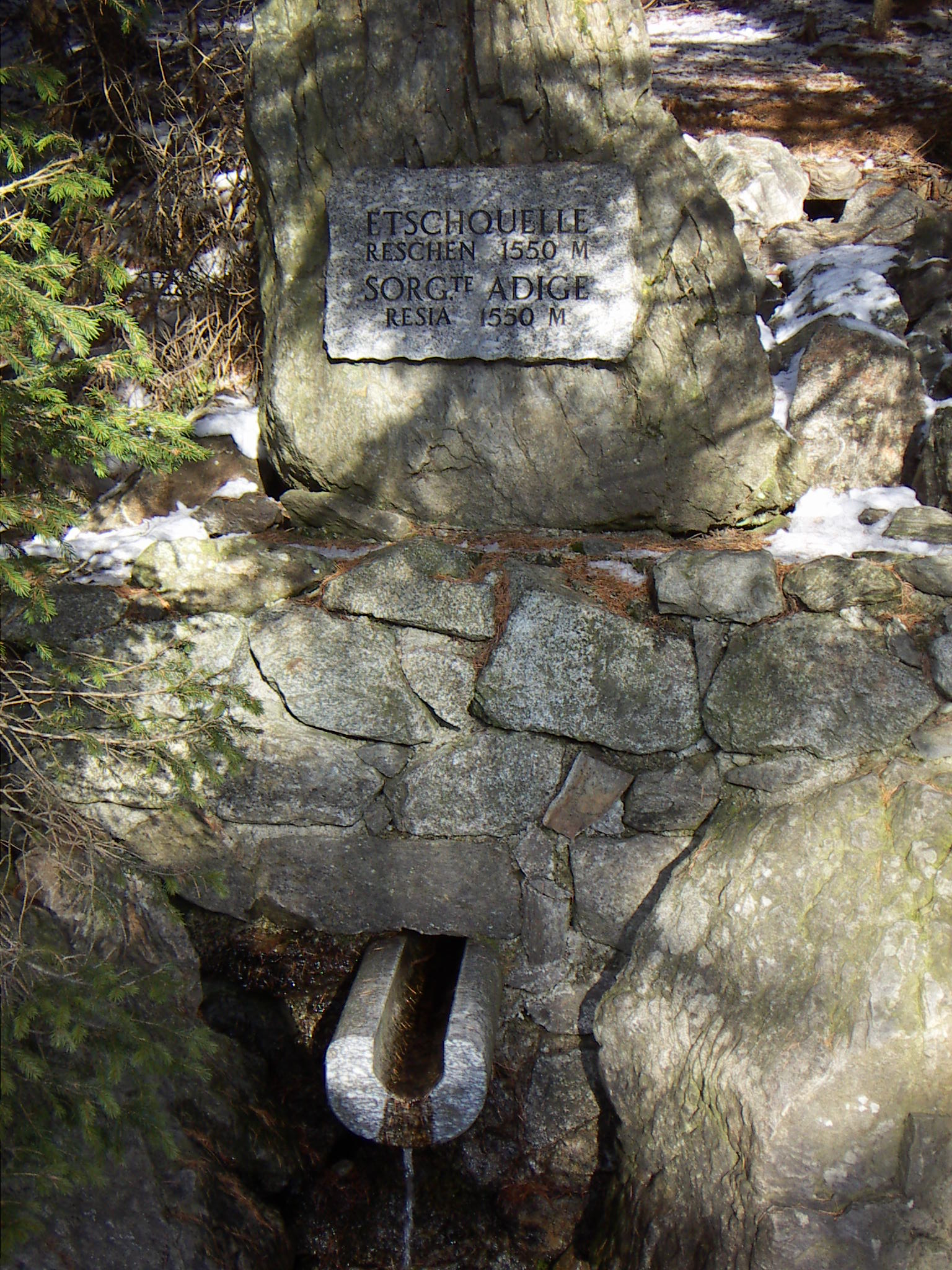
The false source

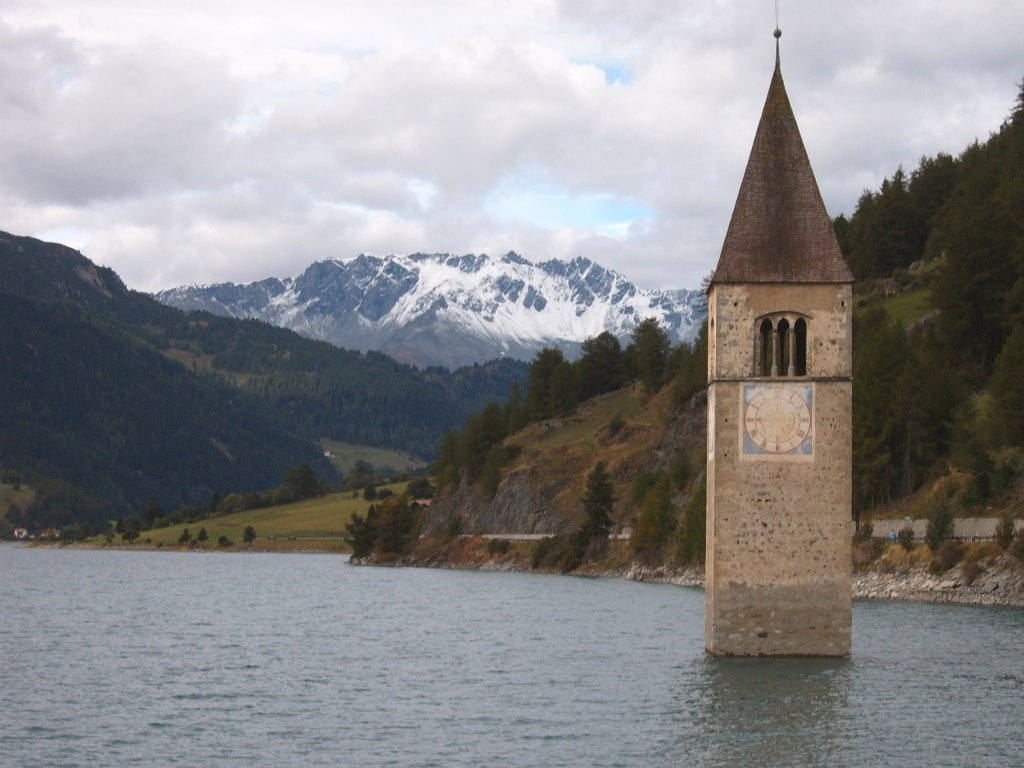
Graun, the bell tower in the Reschensee

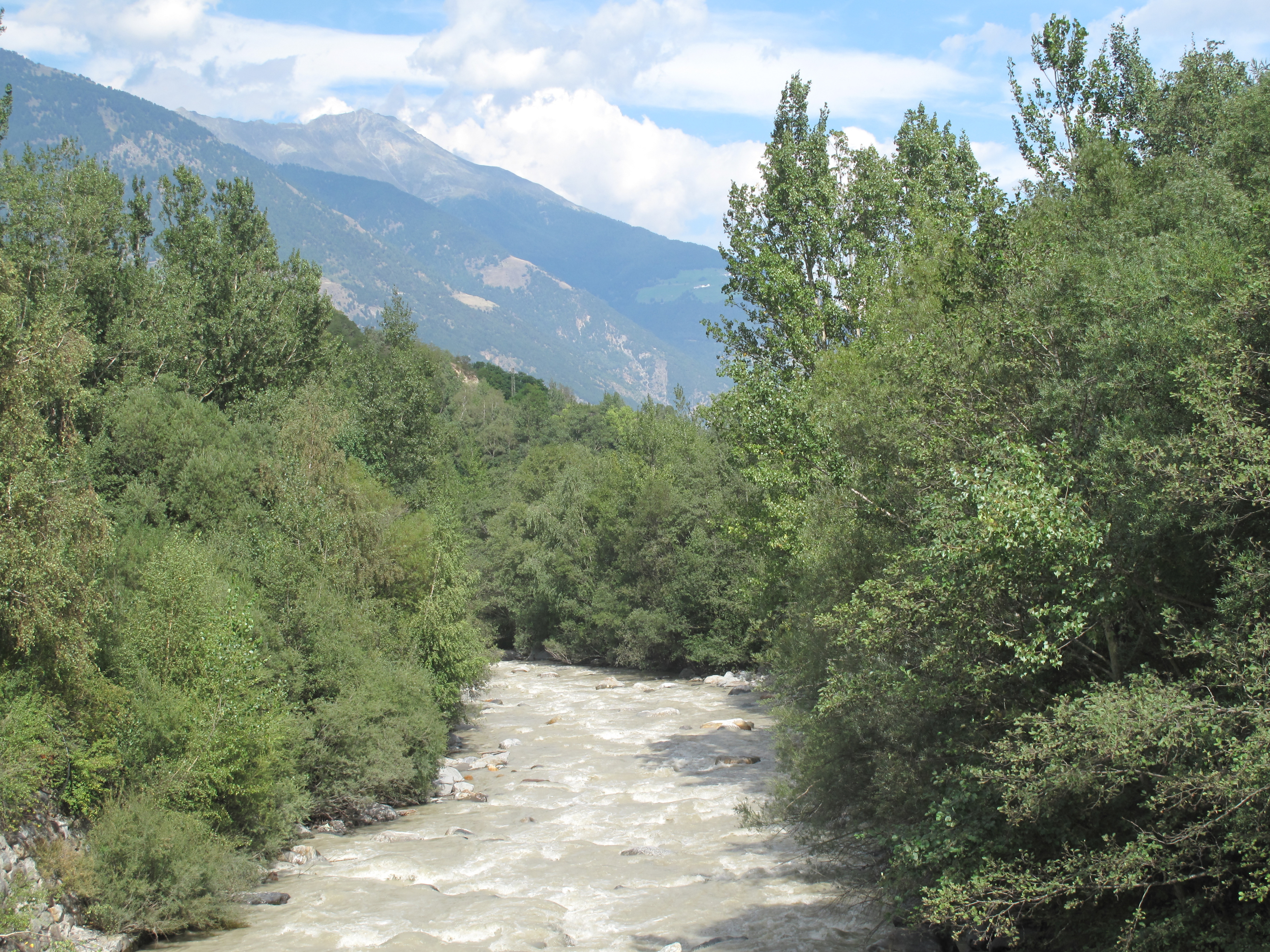
The Adige between Laas and Göflan in the Vinschgau

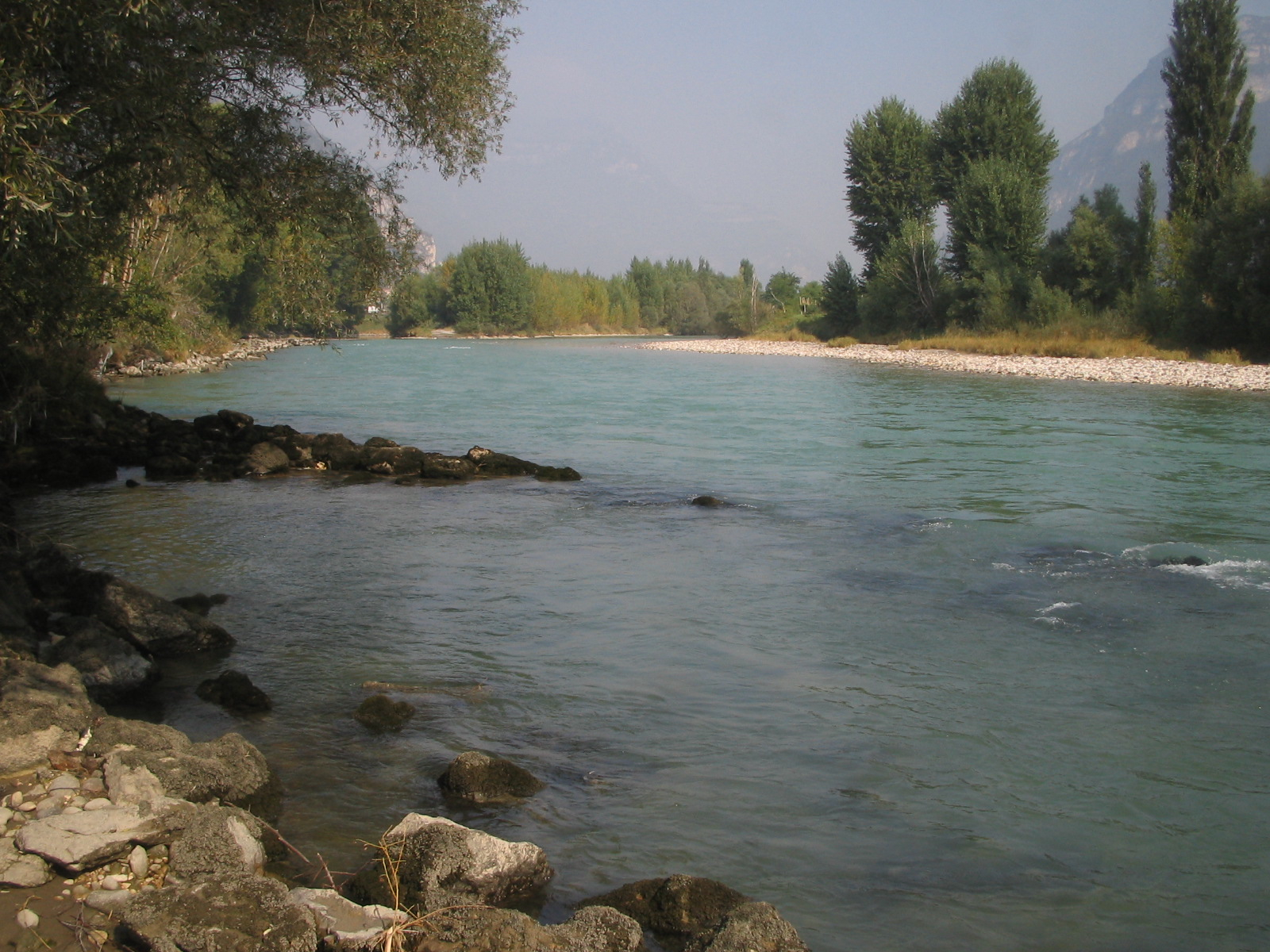
The Adige flowing through Lagarina Valley

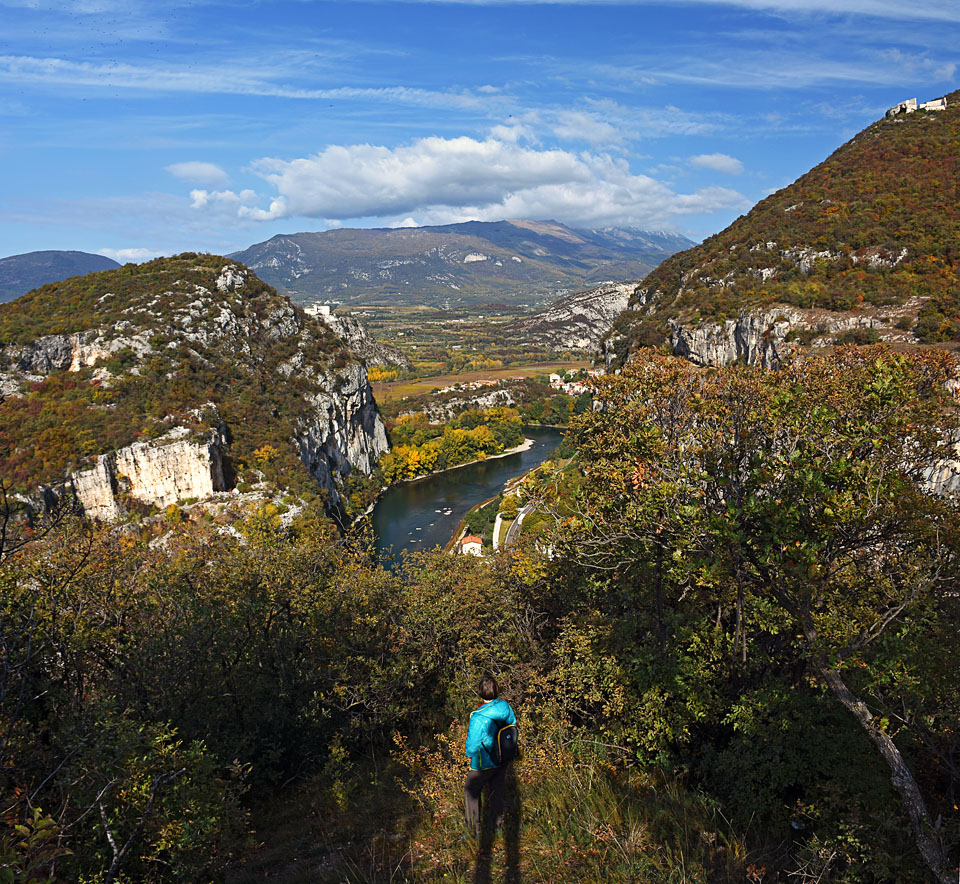
Adige canyon at Chiusa

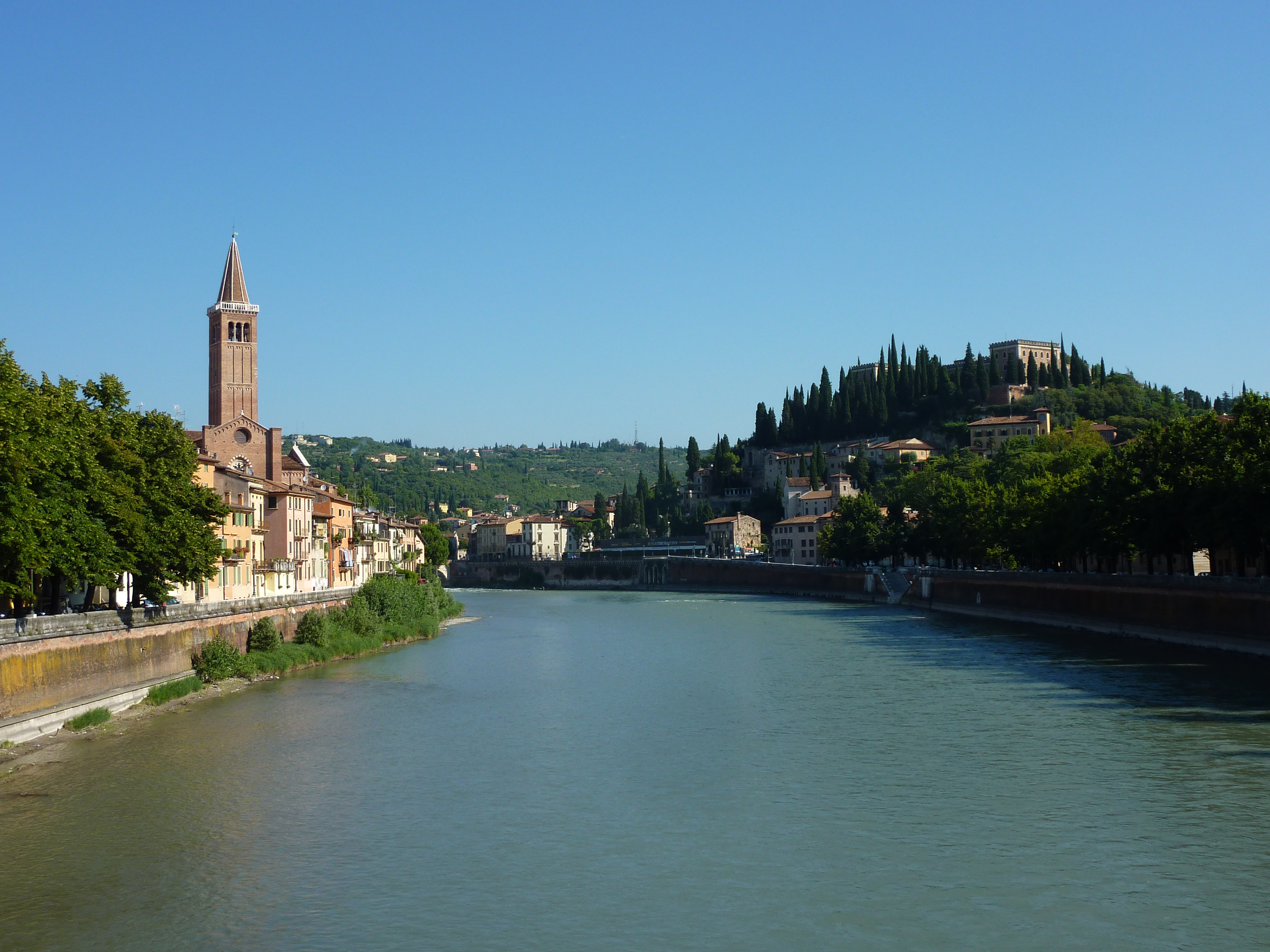
The Adige flowing through Verona

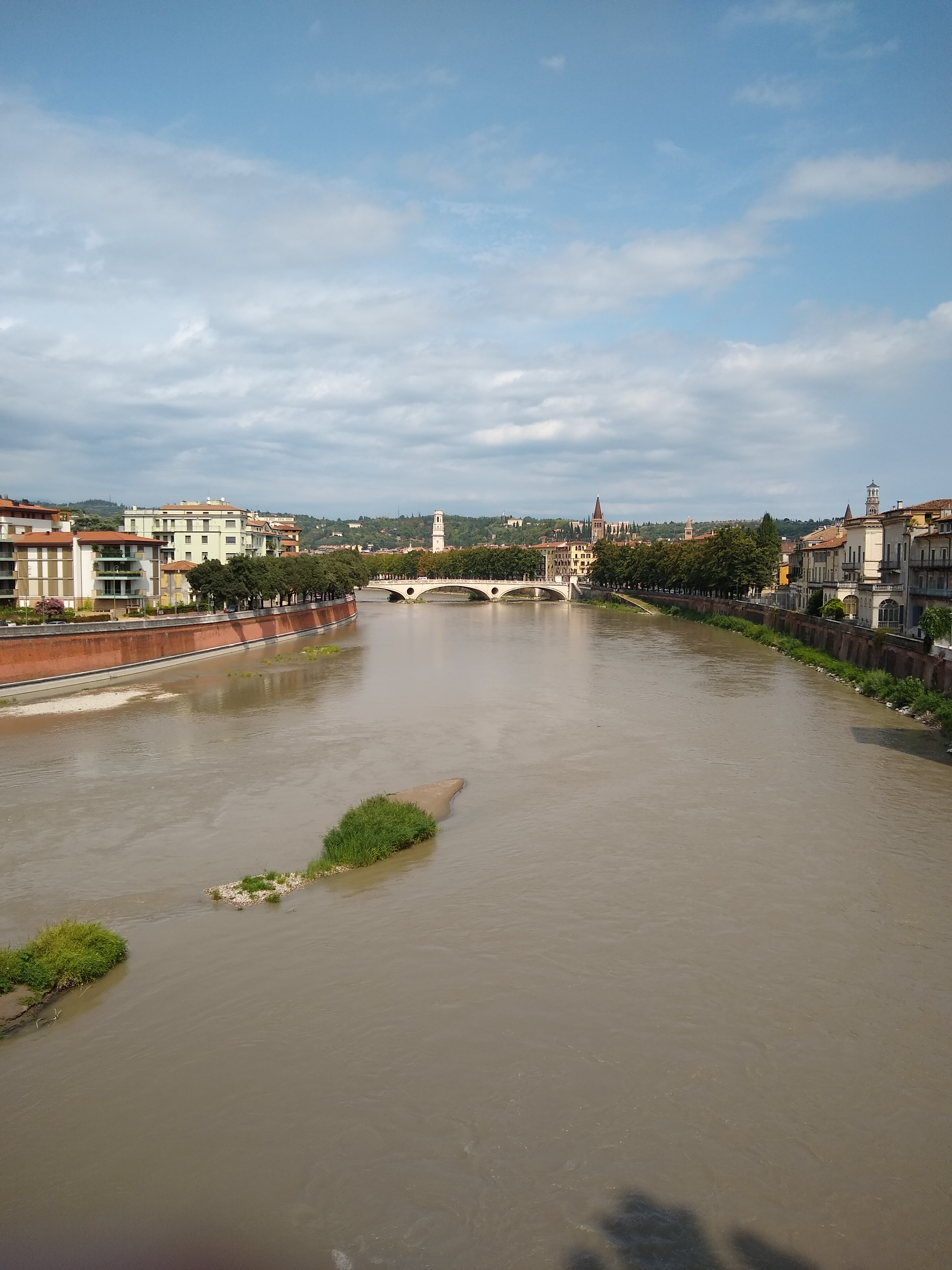
The Adige flowing through Verona, as seen from the Castelvecchio Bridge

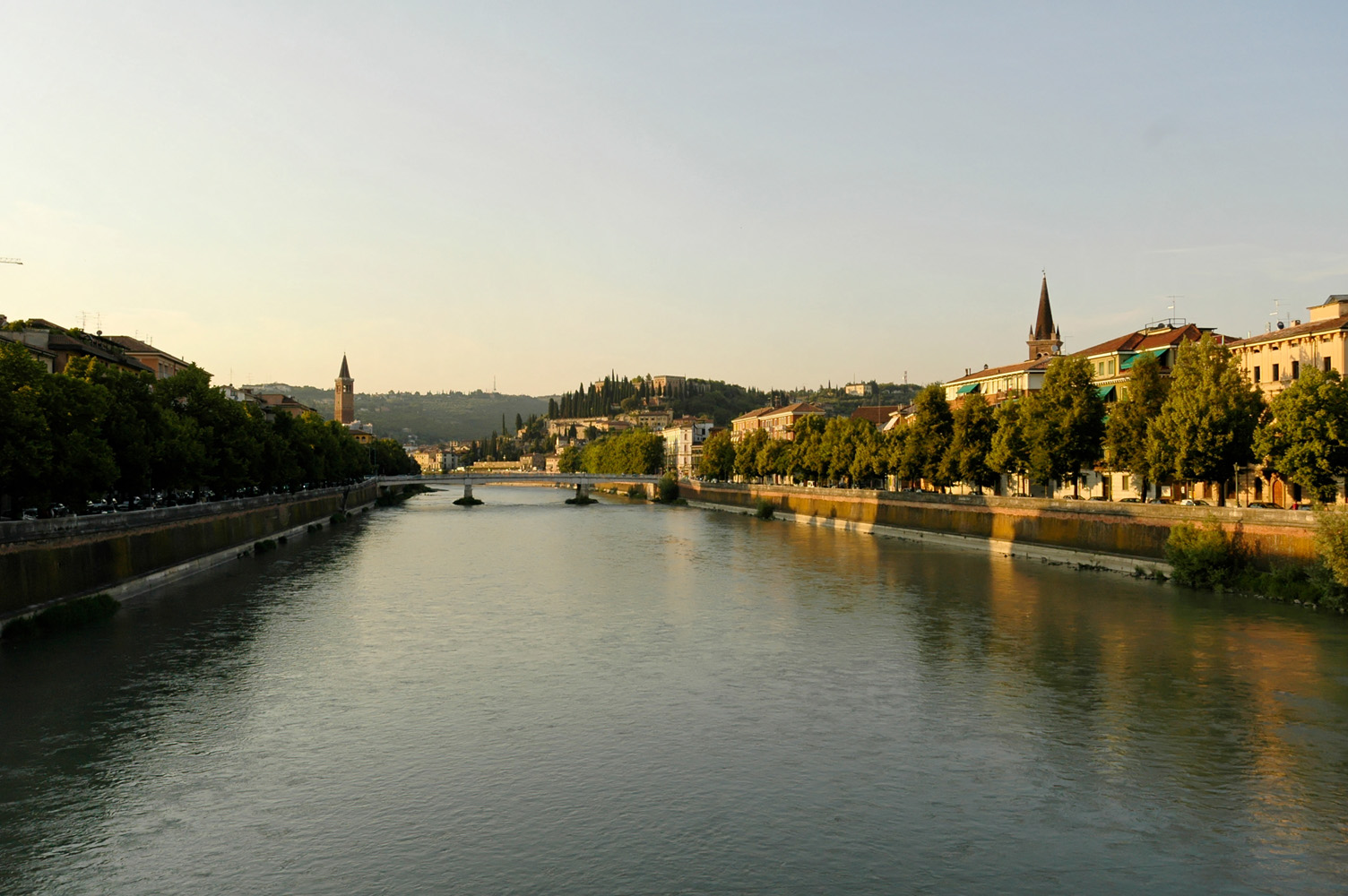
The Adige flowing through Verona

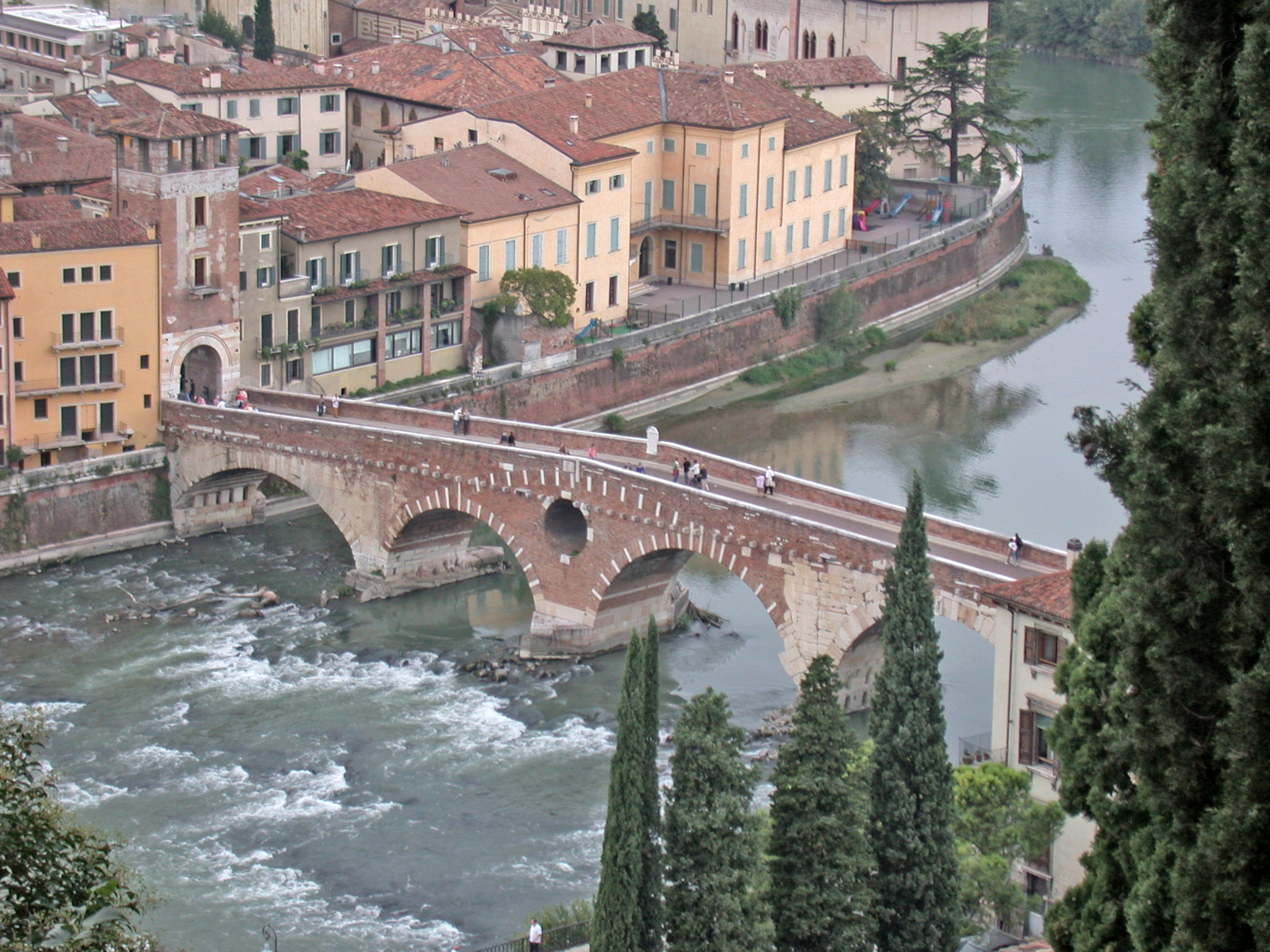
The Adige flowing through Verona seen from Castel San Pietro

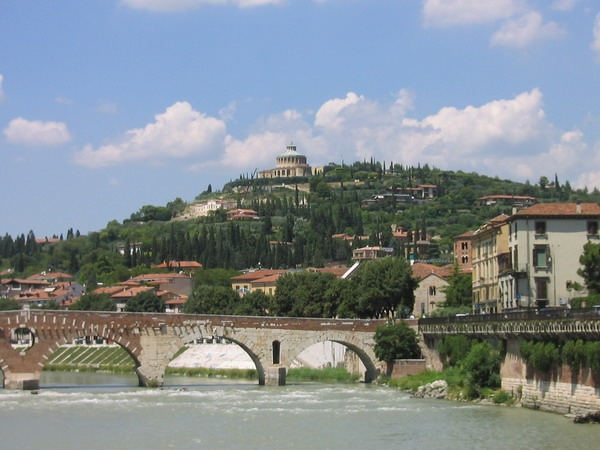
Adige River and Ponte Pietra in Verona

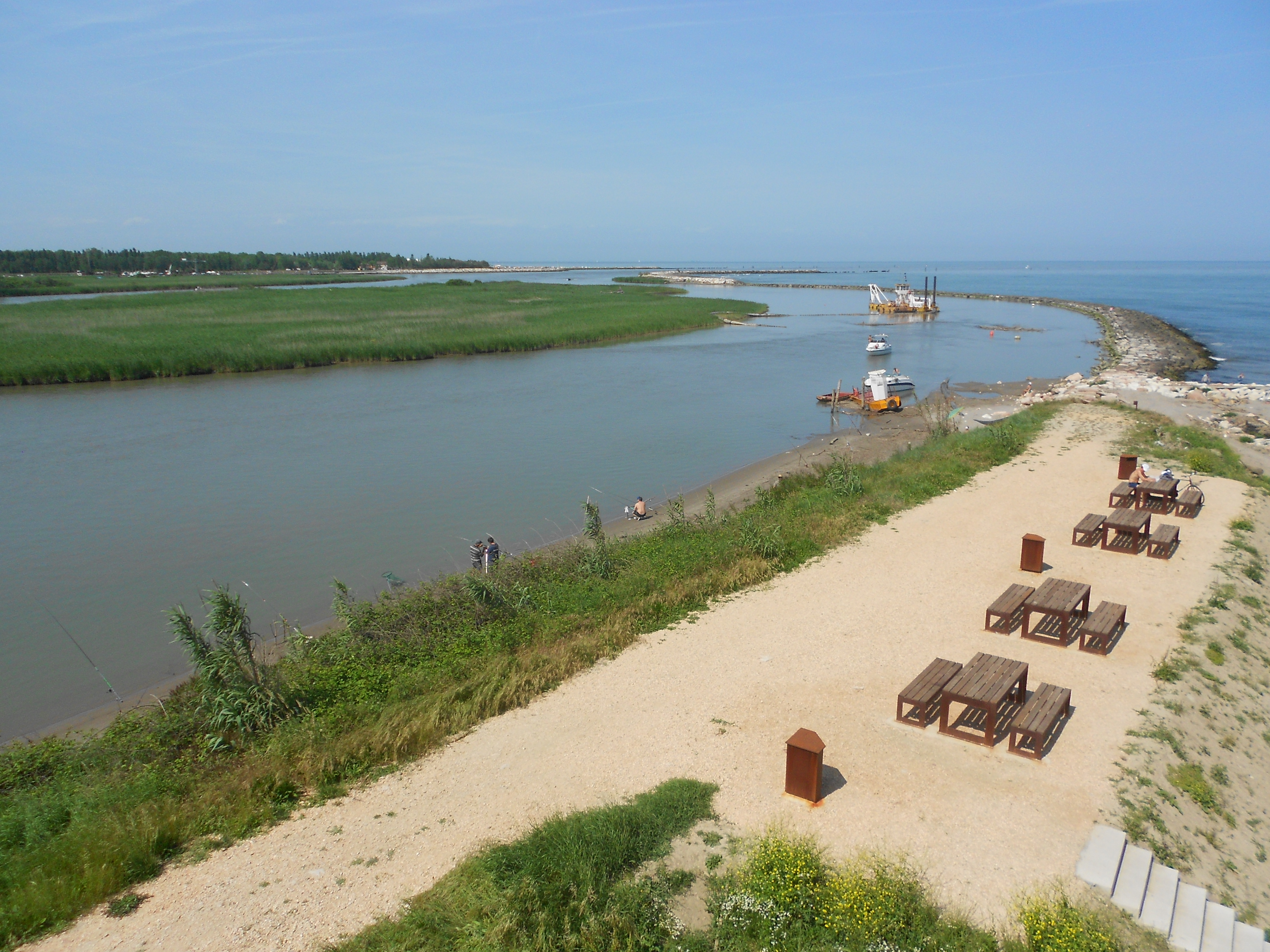
The mouth of the Adige at Rosolina Mare

== See also ==
- Leno, one of the main tributaries of the Adige River
