= Mori–Torbole tunnel =

Coordinates: 45.861°N 10.876°E

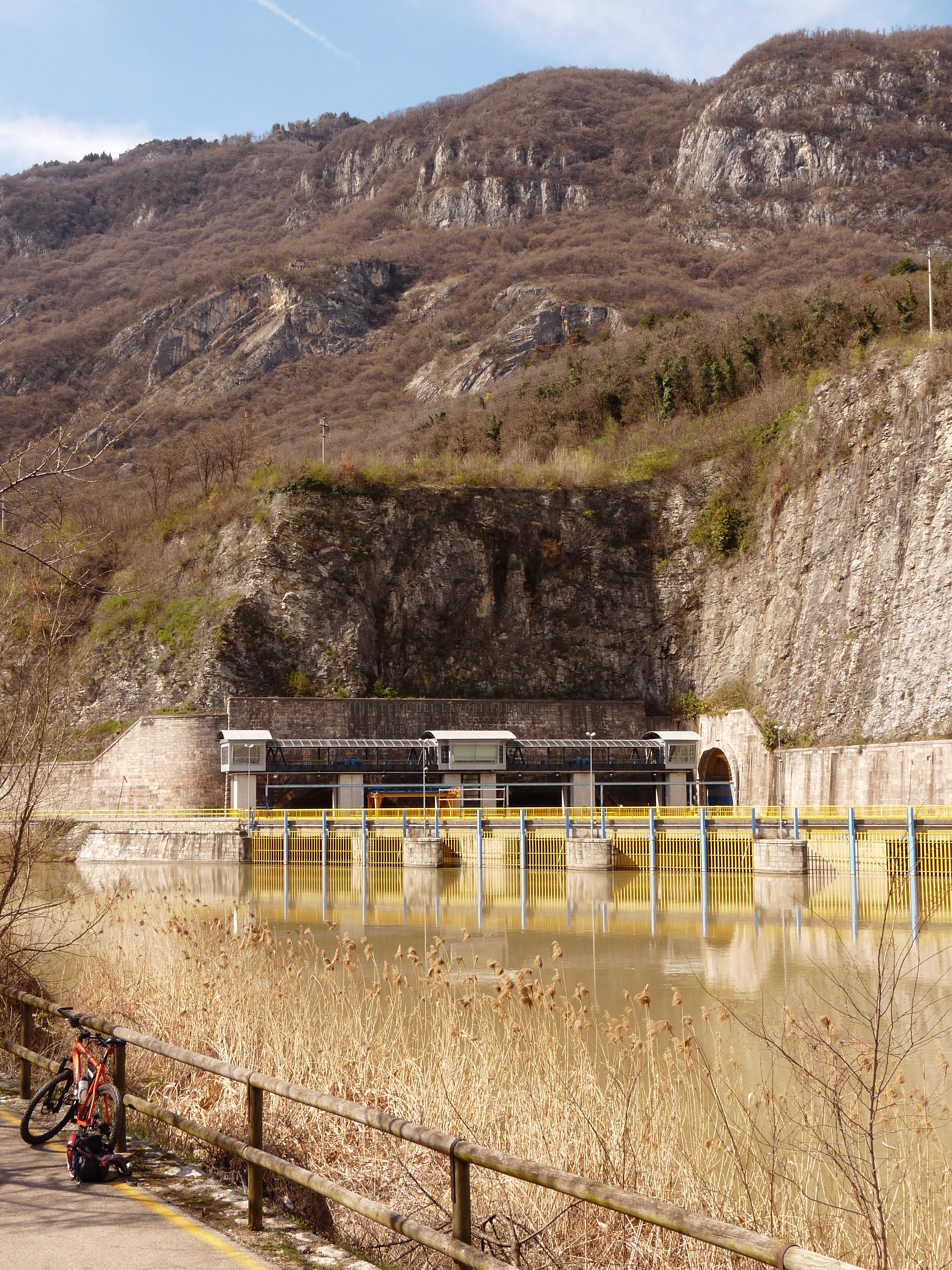
The entrance of the tunnel in Mori, seen from the bike path

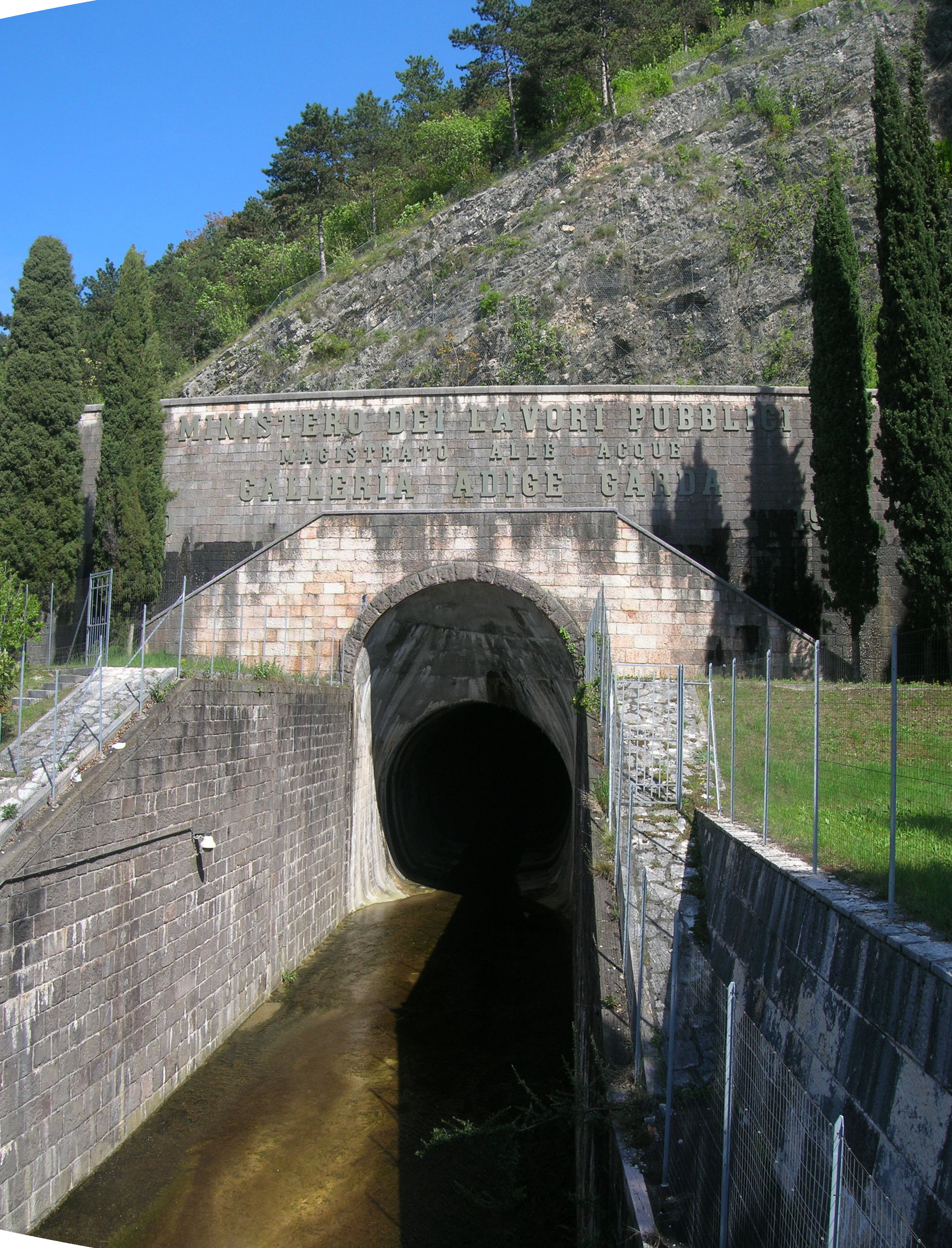
The outlet of the tunnel in Torbole, seen from the route SS249 "Gardesana Orientale"

The Mori–Torbole Tunnel (Italian: Galleria Adige–Garda) is a diversion tunnel completed in 1959 between the Italian towns of Mori and Nago-Torbole to connect the Adige river with Lake Garda.

Its function is to reduce water levels in the river upstream of the province of Verona by discharging excess water into the lake. The tunnel reduces the risk of flooding in Verona and environs from once every seventy years to once every two centuries.

To increase the level of Lake Garda by 0.4 inches (1.0 cm), the tunnel must divert about 130,000,000 cubic feet (3,700,000 cubic metres) of water.

When the tunnel is open, the temperature shock and inflow of mud caused by the sudden influx of the Adige's water endanger the lake's fish populations, although the lake's larger volume is able to absorb large quantities of extraneous water into itself. For these reasons the tunnel is used only on the rare occasion when there is a flood risk in the Veronese basin.

== Main characteristics ==
- Length: 32,392 ft (9,873 m)
- Share of lead: 528 ft (161 m) a.s.l.
- Opening level: 180 ft (55 m) a.s.l.
- Difference: 348 ft (106 m)
- Slope: 0.8688%
- Average diameter: 26 1/4 ft (8.0 m)
- Hydraulic section: 542 1/2 sq ft (50.40 m^{2})
- Maximum capacity: 17,650 cu ft (500 m^{3})
- Water speed at the maximum capacity: 36 ft/s (11 m/s)
- Water speed at the minimum flow: 16 ft/s (4.9 m/s)

== History ==
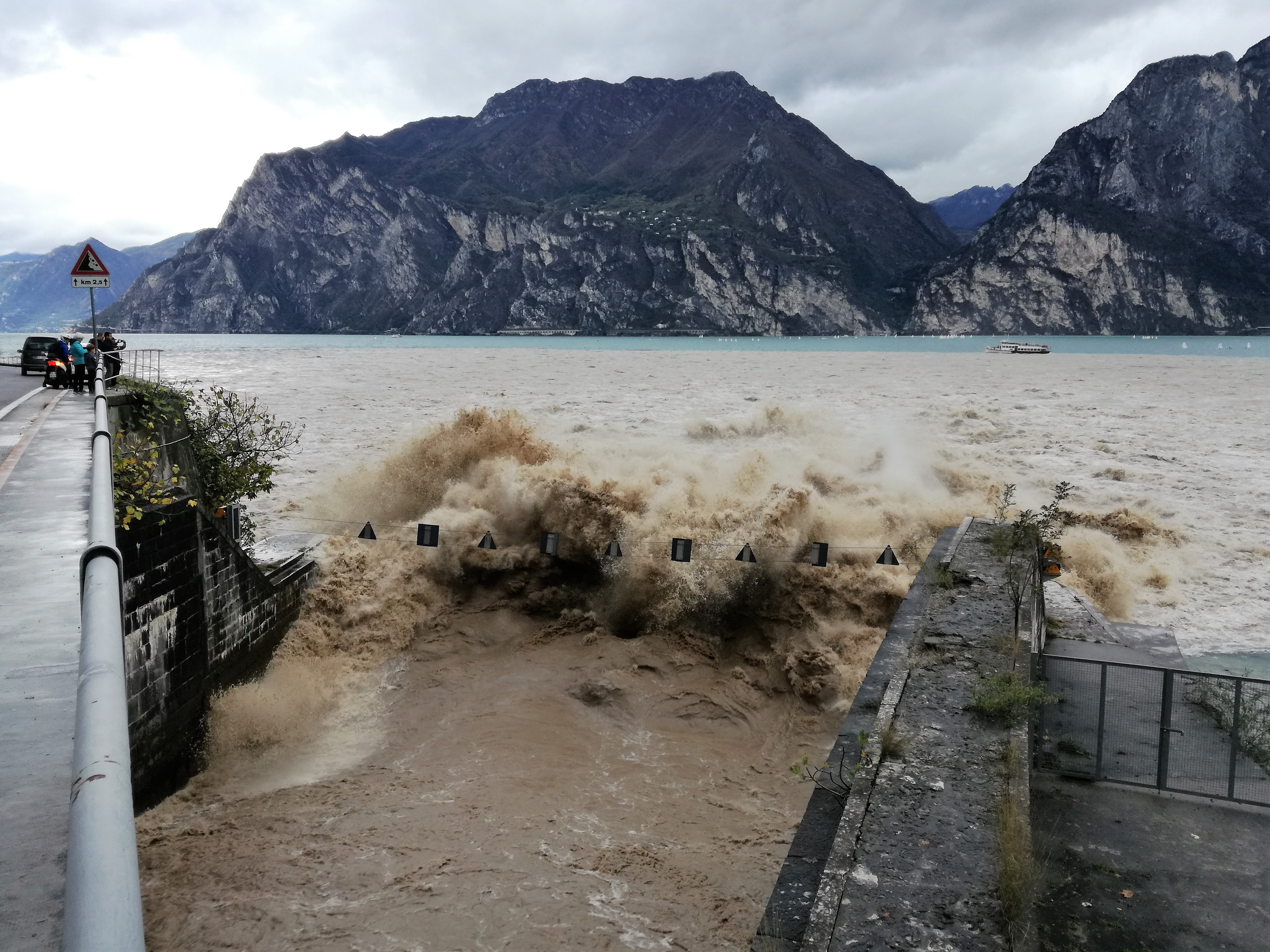
Water from river Adige discharged into the lake on 30 October 2018 during Storm Vaia.

After the great floods of the second part of the 19th century (the last in 1882), defense of the city of Verona from Adige floods was deemed urgent. Using an idea already established in the 18th century, Venice's Water Magistrate proposed constructing a diversion tunnel to Lake Garda that would alleviate flooding by conveying that part of the Adige's flow exceeding the river's carrying capacity. The lake's surface area, equal to about 142 square miles (370 km^{2}), would allow the diversion of huge volumes of river water with only a modest increase in the lake's level. The most appropriate solution was considered to be a tunnel originating on the right bank of the Adige near Ravazzone (a subdivision of Mori) and terminating at Lake Garda to the south of Torbole. The depth of the lake at that location would allow solid material that might be transported by the water to be deposited without damage. Construction began under the fascist government in March 1939, was suspended for the war in 1943, then resumed in 1954 to finish in May 1959.

Lake Loppio was drained during the construction of the tunnel. Water leaks became common as the tunnel approached the lake, and the lake was drained to prevent these and to reduce the danger posed to the workers.

The tunnel has been used only 13 distinct times since its opening. Here's a full list of those uses:

Date	Water discharged	Maximum flow rate
17 September 1960	70,000,000 m³	450 m³/s
2 September 1965	79,000,000 m³	440 m³/s
17 August 1966	17,000,000 m³	280 m³/s
4 November 1966	64,000,000 m³	492 m³/s
14 September 1976	12,000,000 m³	300 m³/s
17 November 1980	26,000,000 m³	300 m³/s
19 July 1981	7,000,000 m³	300 m³/s
23 May 1983	20,000,000 m³	300 m³/s
17 November 2000	4,700,000 m³	100 m³/s
26 November 2002	6,100,000 m³	100 m³/s
30 October 2018	17,500,000 m³	350 m³/s
31 October 2023	3,500,000 m³	150 m³/s

== Features ==
The electromechanical equipment that supports the Adige-Garda Tunnel consists of grilles, watertight doors and gates with associated control panels, and controls housed in special rooms. The gates are positioned on four intake windows. Each gate has a width of 31 feet (9.4 m) and is made up of two overlapping panels. The lower of the two panels is 10 feet (3.0 m) high and the upper one 16 feet (4.9 m) high.

== See also ==
- Tunnel
- List of water tunnels
