= Lago di Loppio =

Lake in Italy

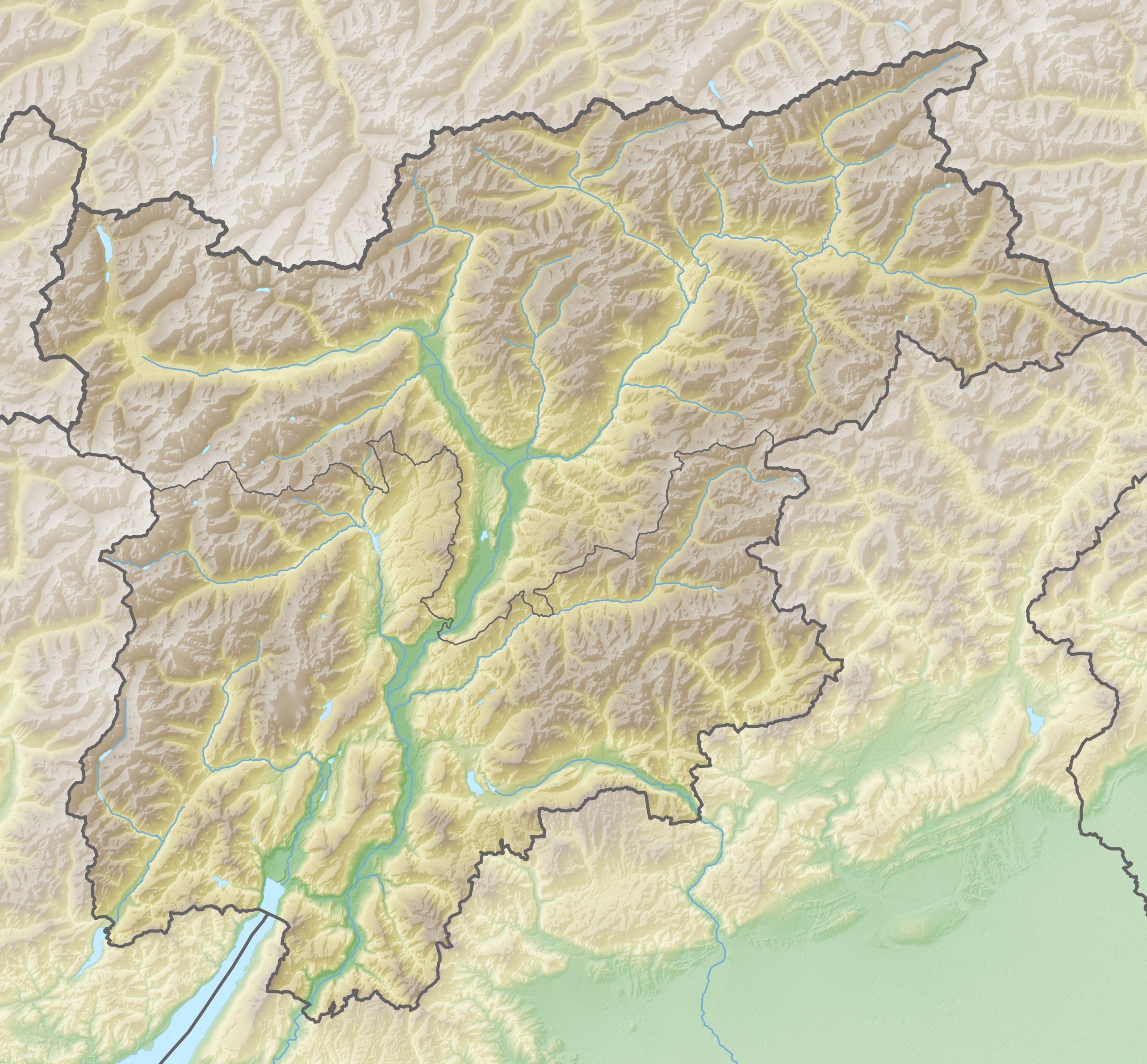
- Location within Trentino-Alto Adige/Südtirol
- Location: Trentino
- Coordinates: 45°51′N 10°55′E
- Basin countries: Italy
- Surface area: 60 ha (150 acres)
- Max. depth: 4 m (13 ft)
- Surface elevation: 224 m (735 ft)

Lago di Loppio is a lake in Trentino, Italy.

The lake has been drained due to the construction of the Mori-Torbole Tunnel in 1954. Occasionally, it fills up with water for a short time when hit by heavy rain.

The lake basin is now a wetland that constitutes a specific ecosystem hosting a peculiar flora and fauna. For that reason, the Autonomous Province of Trento declared this area as a protected biotope.
