= Resia gens =

The gens Resia was an obscure plebeian family at ancient Rome. The Resii traced their ancestry to Fertor Resius, King of the Aequicoli, in the time of the Roman monarchy. However, few members of this gens are mentioned in history.

== Origin ==
According to tradition, Fertor Resius was King of the Aequicoli, an Oscan-speaking people better known as the Aequi, a confederation of hill tribes whom together with the Volsci came into regular conflict with the nascent Roman Republic during the fifth century BC. An Old Latin inscription discovered on the Palatine Hill records that Resius taught the Roman people the ius fetiale, the law prescribing the manner in which an ambassador should approach another people to demand redress for various grievances, or deliver a formal declaration of war:

Fert[o]r Resius, Rex Aequicolus, is preimus ius fetiale paravit inde p(opulus) R(omanus) discipleinam excepit.
Fertor Resius, King of the Aequicoli, first instituted the ius fetiale. From him the Roman people acquired the discipline.

Livy describes this procedure as it was first adopted by Ancus Marcius, the fourth King of Rome, in the latter part of the seventh century BC, and reports that the ius fetiale was adopted from the Aequicoli, although he does not name Resius. Dionysius discusses the institution of the fetiales and the ius fetiale under Numa Pompilius, the second King of Rome, (Note: Other passages in Livy seem to place the institution of the fetiales and the ius fetiale earlier; he refers to them in the time of Tullus Hostilius, the third King of Rome.) and mentions the tradition that the law originated with the Aequicolae, together with an alternative tradition, mentioned by the historian Gnaeus Gellius, attributing the ius fetiale to the people of Ardea, but like Livy he does not name their king.

== Praenomina ==
The legendary Fertor Resius bore an otherwise unknown praenomen, which some scholars have amended to Sertor, a known but archaic name; but the current consensus is that Fertor is a separate name. The Resii of historical times bear more conventional praenomina, of which the most frequent appear to have been Titus and Aulus. Other names used by the Resii include Gaius, Manius, and Marcus.

== Branches and cognomina ==
There is no evidence that the Resii were ever divided into distinct families, and all of their surnames have the appearance of personal cognomina, such as Asper, rough, Aster, a star, Genialis, genial, and Severus, stern. Albanus would probably belong to a class of surnames derived from the town of the bearer's origin, perhaps indicating that his family had lived in the Alban Hills. Patruus, the surname of one of the Resii from Vicentia in Venetia and Histria, referred to a paternal uncle, and probably served to distinguish him from his nephew and namesake. A number of other surnames borne by freedmen would have been their original personal names, prior to their manumission.

Several women of this gens bore surnames derived from old praenomina, which served the same individualizing function, although placed after the gentilicium, such as Gaia, the feminine of Gaius; Paula, little; Prima, a name given to the eldest daughter in a family; and Rufa, red-haired. Victoria presumably refers to the goddess of the same name.

== Members ==
This list includes abbreviated praenomina. For an explanation of this practice, see filiation.

- Fertor Resius, King of the Aequicoli in the time of the Roman monarchy, to whom the institution of the ius fetiale was ascribed.
- Titus Resius T. f., governor of an uncertain province between 50 and 20 BC, built a sepulchre at Mevania in Umbria.
- Titus Resius, built a tomb at Amiternum in Sabinum for his friend, Lucius Aufidius Trophimus.
- Resius Albanus, a centurion in the fifth legion, and the former master of Resius Chronius.
- Aulus Resius A. f. Asper, the son of Resius Aster, buried at Rome.
- Resius Aster, the father of Aulus Resius Asper.
- Resius Chronius, freedman of Resius Albanus, was buried at Oescus in Moesia Inferior, aged forty-five.
- Resia T. l. Cleopatra, a freedwoman named in an inscription from Rome, together with Resia Prima, another freedwoman, and a freedman, Sextus Servilius Veiento.
- Resia Gaia, the wife of Aurelius Vitalis, a centurion in the fourth legion. Together with her husband's cousin, Aurelius Proclianus, Resia built a tomb for Vitalis at Eporedia in Cisalpine Gaul.
- Aulus Resius A. f. Genialis, son of Aulus Resius Moschus and Claretis, buried in the family sepulchre built by his father at Rome.
- Aulus Resius Moschus, the husband of Claretis, and father of Aulus Resius Genialis, whom he buried in the family sepulchre that he built at Rome.
- Gaius Resius C. f. Patruus, one of the duumviri jure dicundo at Vicetia in Venetia and Histria; from his cognomen, perhaps the uncle of Gaius Resius Severus.
- Resia M. [f.?] Paula, built a monument at Saturnia in Etruria for someone whose name has been lost.
- Resia T. l. Prima, a freedwoman named in an inscription from Rome, together with Resia Cleopatra, another freedwoman, and a freedman, Sextus Servilius Veiento.
- Resia T. f. Rufa, named in a dedicatory inscription from Ferentinum in Latium.
- Resia T. l. Rufa, a freedwoman named in an inscription from Mevania.
- Gaius Resius M'. f. Severus, one of the duumviri jure dicundo at Vicetia, perhaps the nephew of Gaius Resius Patruus.
- Resia Victoria, made a libationary offering to a deity at Ampsancto in Samnium.

== See also ==
- List of Roman gentes
- Si deus si dea

== Bibliography ==
- Titus Livius (Livy), History of Rome.
- Dionysius of Halicarnassus, Romaike Archaiologia.
- Theodor Mommsen et alii, Corpus Inscriptionum Latinarum (The Body of Latin Inscriptions, abbreviated CIL), Berlin-Brandenburgische Akademie der Wissenschaften (1853–present).
- Dictionary of Greek and Roman Antiquities, William Smith, ed., Little, Brown, and Company, Boston (1859).
- Bullettino della Commissione Archeologica Comunale in Roma (Bulletin of the Municipal Archaeological Commission of Rome, abbreviated BCAR), (1872–present).
- René Cagnat et alii, L'Année épigraphique (The Year in Epigraphy, abbreviated AE), Presses Universitaires de France (1888–present).
- Harper's Dictionary of Classical Literature and Antiquities, Harry Thurston Peck, ed. (Second Edition, 1897).
- Paul von Rohden, Elimar Klebs, & Hermann Dessau, Prosopographia Imperii Romani (The Prosopography of the Roman Empire, abbreviated PIR), Berlin (1898).
- Ada Gunnella, "Iscrizioni Inedite di Saturnia" (Unedited Inscriptions from Saturnia), in Epigraphica, vol. 45, pp. 128–139 (1983).
- Mika Kajava, Roman Female Praenomina: Studies in the Nomenclature of Roman Women, Acta Instituti Romani Finlandiae (1994).
- John C. Traupman, The New College Latin & English Dictionary, Bantam Books, New York (1995).
