= Reschen Pass =

Mountain pass of the Alps between South Tyrol, Italy and Tyrol, Austria

Reschen pass
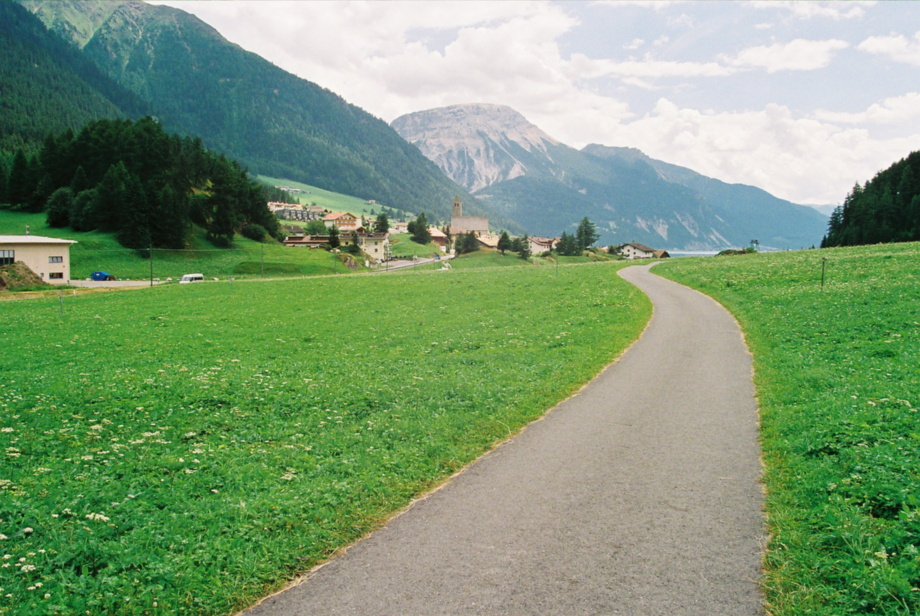
- Pass summit at Reschen, looking southwards

- Location within Alps
- Elevation: 1,504 metres (4,934 ft)

Third Approach
- Location: Austria–Italy border
- Range: Alps
- Coordinates: 46°50′53″N 10°30′18″E

Reschen Pass (German: Reschenpass, pronounced [ˈrɛʃn̩ˌpas]; Italian: Passo di Resia [ˈpasso di ˈrɛːzja]) is a mountain pass across the main chain of the Alps, connecting the Upper Inn Valley in the northwest with the Vinschgau region in the southeast. Since 1919, the border between South Tyrol, Italy and Tyrol, Austria has approximately followed the watershed, the pass summit at a height of 1,504 metres (4,934 ft) being completely on Italian territory.

== Geography ==
=== Location ===
Reschen is one of the principal passes of the Alps, located between Brenner Pass to the east and the Splügen to the west. It is part of the drainage divide between the Danube in the north and the Adige in the south.

The village of Reschen (Resia) is directly located on the watershed, on the shore of the Reschensee reservoir, built in 1950 and famous for the bell tower which emerges from the water in front of Graun municipality. The border with Nauders, Austria runs about 2 kilometres (1.2 mi) north of the pass summit towards the tripoint with Valsot, Switzerland in the west.

=== Climate ===
Reschen has a cool summer humid continental climate. Winter highs can reach around 8–10 °C (46–50 °F), but can also be as cold as −10 °C (14 °F). In summertime, maxima can be as high as 25–28 °C (77–82 °F), or as low as single figures. However, minimum temperatures generally stay above 0 °C (32 °F).

Climate data for Resia Pass ITA, 1990–2018 normals, 2009-2018 sun hours.
Month	Jan	Feb	Mar	Apr	May	Jun	Jul	Aug	Sep	Oct	Nov	Dec	Year
Record high °C (°F)	13 (55)	14 (57)	20 (68)	21 (70)	25 (77)	30 (86)	30 (86)	32 (90)	29 (84)	23 (73)	19 (66)	14 (57)	32 (90)
Mean daily maximum °C (°F)	1.1 (34.0)	2.4 (36.3)	6.6 (43.9)	10.0 (50.0)	14.2 (57.6)	18.1 (64.6)	20.2 (68.4)	19.8 (67.6)	15.7 (60.3)	11.3 (52.3)	5.4 (41.7)	1.7 (35.1)	10.5 (50.9)
Daily mean °C (°F)	−2.7 (27.1)	−1.8 (28.8)	2.1 (35.8)	5.4 (41.7)	9.7 (49.5)	13.3 (55.9)	15.3 (59.5)	15.2 (59.4)	11.4 (52.5)	7.4 (45.3)	2.2 (36.0)	−1.5 (29.3)	6.3 (43.3)
Mean daily minimum °C (°F)	−6.4 (20.5)	−6.1 (21.0)	−2.5 (27.5)	0.9 (33.6)	5.3 (41.5)	8.5 (47.3)	10.4 (50.7)	10.5 (50.9)	7.2 (45.0)	3.6 (38.5)	−0.9 (30.4)	−4.8 (23.4)	2.1 (35.8)
Record low °C (°F)	−20.0 (−4.0)	−20.0 (−4.0)	−22.0 (−7.6)	−14.0 (6.8)	−6.2 (20.8)	−1.0 (30.2)	1.0 (33.8)	0.0 (32.0)	−2.8 (27.0)	−10.0 (14.0)	−13.0 (8.6)	−19.0 (−2.2)	−22.0 (−7.6)
Average rainfall mm (inches)	28 (1.1)	29 (1.1)	29 (1.1)	37 (1.5)	71 (2.8)	64 (2.5)	84 (3.3)	91 (3.6)	57 (2.2)	38 (1.5)	47 (1.9)	31 (1.2)	606 (23.9)
Average relative humidity (%)	70.4	67.6	63.0	63.1	66.1	66.6	66.7	70.1	72.3	75.1	73.8	71.8	68.9
Mean monthly sunshine hours	138.6	124.0	161.2	233.6	250.7	270.6	311.6	304.9	265.7	180.5	142.3	147.8	2,531.2
Source: Il Meteo, Il Meteo (for precipitation figures), and World Weather Online (for sun hours, 2009-2018.)

Average number of days per month with:
	January	February	March	April	May	June	July	August	September	October	November	December	Year
Maximum temperature below freezing	12.9	8.7	2.5	0.3	0.0	0.0	0.0	0.0	0.0	0.1	3.7	11.3	39.5
Minimum temperature below freezing	29.2	27.1	23.3	12.2	1.2	0.1	0.0	0.0	0.2	5.4	18.3	29.0	145.8

The above table is for the period 1990–2017.

== History ==
Even before the Roman era, an unnamed bridle path linked the valley of the Inn River with the valley of the Adige (de. Etsch; lad. Adesc) river. The current Reschen Pass route was part of the Via Claudia Augusta, opened about 50 AD. Later superseded by the Via Raetia across Brenner Pass, built at the behest of Emperor Septimius Severus in the 2nd century, it remained one of the few Roman roads leading into the Raetia province and to Augusta Vindelicorum. During the Middle Ages, the pass was an alternative to the passes of Graubünden in the west, though from the 14th century onwards the parallel Brenner Pass road from Bozen through the Eisack Valley in the east gained more and more importance.

Unlike the wide and smooth southern side, the northern side of Reschen Pass has a steep and narrow bottleneck at Finstermünz (1188 m). Archduke Sigismund of Austria had a fortress built here in 1472, and until 1854 a custom house between the Austrian County of Tyrol and Switzerland sat between two fortified bridges over the Inn river.

The Austrian engineer Carl Ritter von Ghega (who already had built the Semmering railway line from Vienna through Lower Austria and Styria to Graz) and Joseph Duile laid out plans for a new road from the fortress of Nauders (1394 m) to Cajetansbrücke near Pfunds (972 m), which was built between 1850 and 1854. This road leads to Reschen Pass along the Eastern, Austrian banking of the Inn, connecting the Austrian lands via Austrian soil. An additional mountain road leads from the Inn valley from the Swiss hamlet Martina resp. the Austrian Martinsbrück up to Norbertshöhe and Nauders, providing a shorter way from Switzerland to Italy than the longer road via Cajetansbrücke. Several structures for a projected railway connection were also built; however, these plans were finally abandoned after World War II.

== See also ==
- List of highest paved roads in Europe
- List of mountain passes
