= Reschensee =

Artificial lake in South Tyrol, Italy

Reschensee Lago di Resia
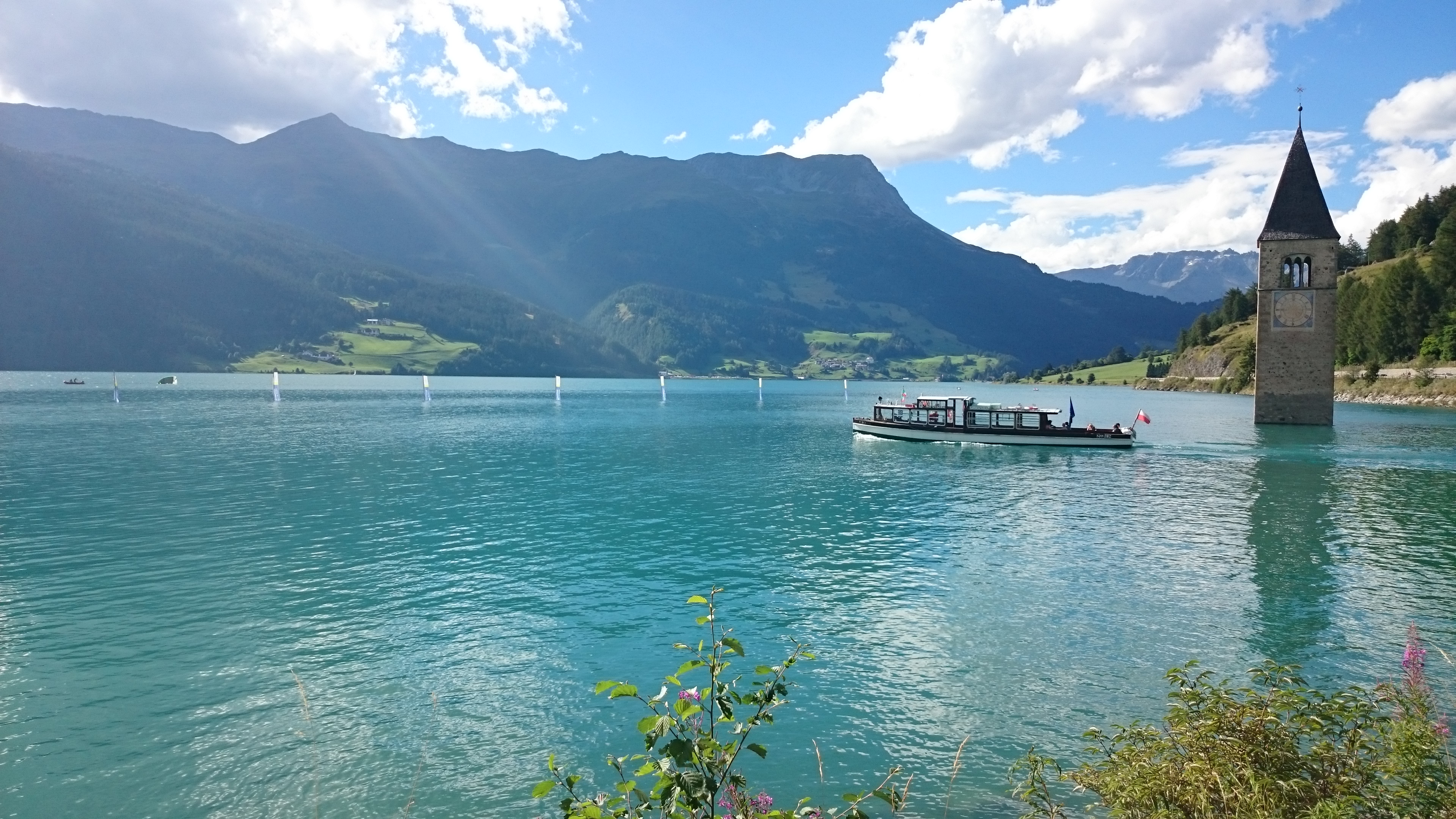
- The bell tower in Reschensee

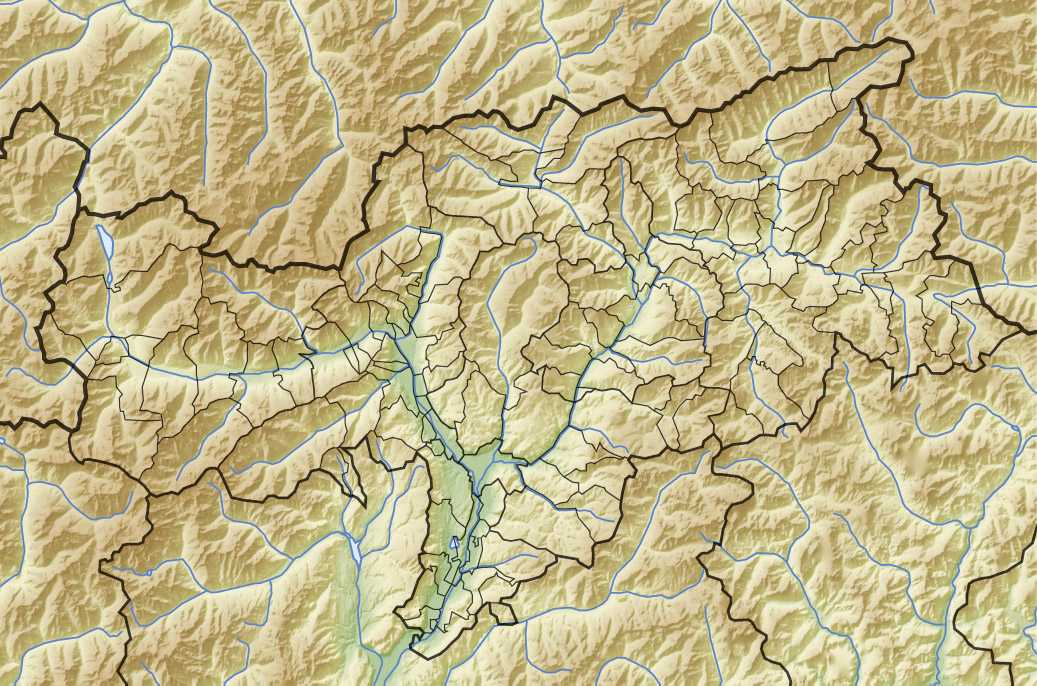
- Location within South Tyrol
- Location: South Tyrol
- Coordinates: 46.801°N 10.531°E
- Type: Artificial
- Primary inflows: Adige
- Primary outflows: Adige
- Basin countries: Italy
- Surface area: 6.6 km^{2} (2.5 sq mi)
- Max. depth: 28 m (92 ft)
- Water volume: 0.12 km^{3} (97,000 ac·ft)
- Surface elevation: 1,498 m (4,915 ft)
- Settlements: Graun im Vinschgau

Reschensee (German: [ˈʁɛʃn̩ˌzeː]; Austrian German pronunciation: [ˈrɛʃn̩ˌseː]; Italian: Lago di Resia [ˈlaːɡo di ˈrɛːzja]) or Lake Reschen is an artificial lake in the western portion of South Tyrol, Italy, approximately 2 km (1 mi) south of the Reschen Pass, which forms the border with Austria, and 3 km (2 mi) east of the mountain ridge forming the border with Switzerland. With its capacity of 120 million m^{3} (97,000 ac·ft) it is the largest lake in the province. Its surface area of 6.6 km^{2} (2.5 sq mi) makes it also the largest lake above 1,000 m (3,300 ft) in the Alps. It is fed by the Adige, Rojenbach and Karlinbach and drained by the Adige.

The lake is famous for the steeple of a submerged 14th-century church; when the water freezes, this can be reached on foot. A legend says that during winter one can still hear church bells ring. In reality the bells were removed from the tower on July 18, 1950, a week before the demolition of the church nave and the creation of the lake.

== Origins ==
Plans for a smaller (5 m deep) artificial lake date from 1920. In July 1939, the Montecatini company (now Edison Energia) introduced a new plan for a 22 m (72 ft)-deep lake, which would unify two natural lakes (Reschensee and Mittersee) and submerge several villages, including Graun and part of Reschen. The creation of the dam started in April 1940 pursuant to this second plan but, due to the war and local resistance, did not finish until July 1950.

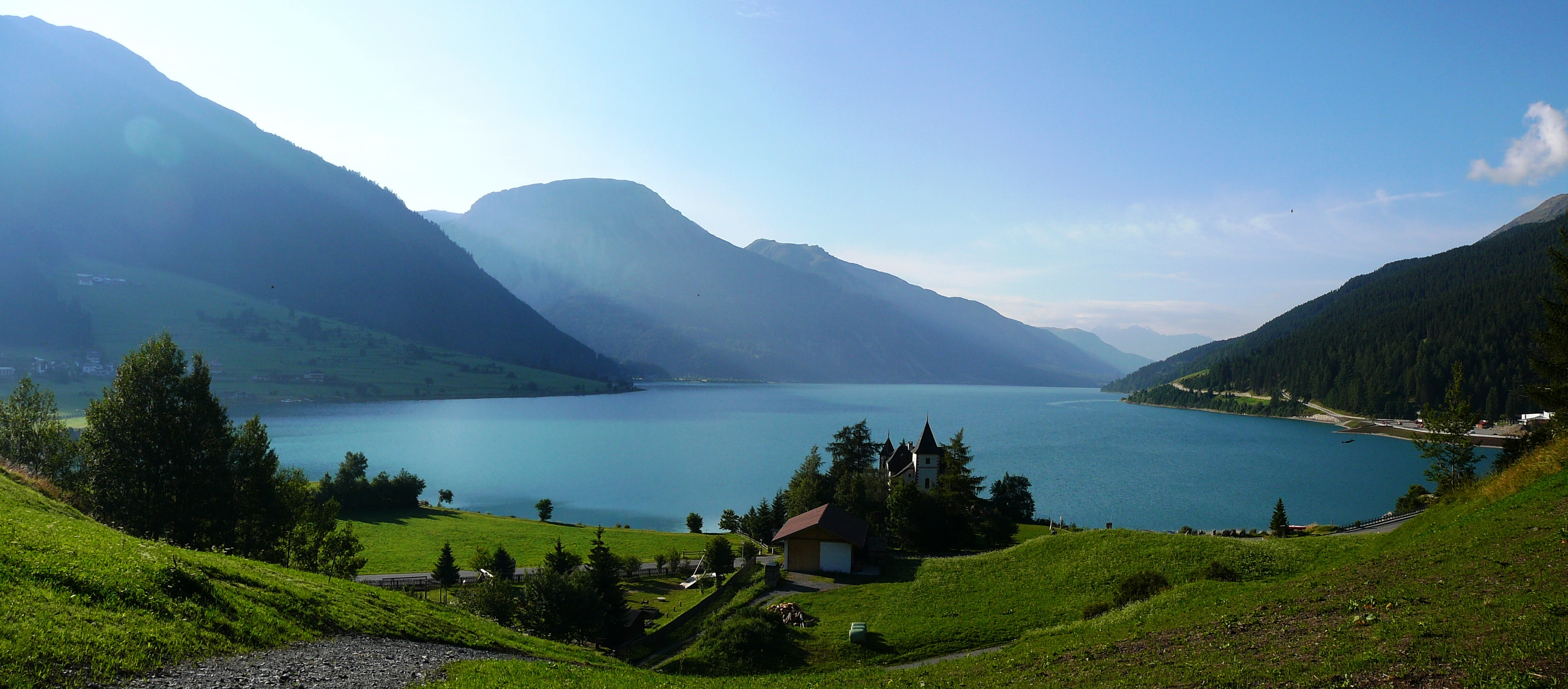
The Reschensee

In 1947 Montecatini received 30 million Swiss francs from the Swiss company Elektrowatt for the construction of the dam (in exchange for 10 years of seasonal electricity), paradoxically after the population of Splügen had voted against the company's plans to build a dam that would have submerged that Swiss village. Graun's population did not have such success, despite the willing ear of Antonio Segni who later became Italy's prime minister. In total 163 homes and 523 hectares (1,290 acres) of cultivated land were submerged.

== Climate ==
Climate data for Reschensee/San Valentino alla Muta, elevation 1,461 m (4,793 ft), (1991–2020)
Month	Jan	Feb	Mar	Apr	May	Jun	Jul	Aug	Sep	Oct	Nov	Dec	Year
Mean daily maximum °C (°F)	1.5 (34.7)	2.8 (37.0)	6.4 (43.5)	9.8 (49.6)	14.3 (57.7)	18.1 (64.6)	20.5 (68.9)	20.2 (68.4)	16.4 (61.5)	11.7 (53.1)	5.7 (42.3)	2.2 (36.0)	10.8 (51.4)
Daily mean °C (°F)	−2.9 (26.8)	−2.1 (28.2)	1.5 (34.7)	5.0 (41.0)	9.5 (49.1)	12.8 (55.0)	15.1 (59.2)	15.0 (59.0)	11.5 (52.7)	7.4 (45.3)	1.9 (35.4)	−1.6 (29.1)	6.1 (43.0)
Mean daily minimum °C (°F)	−7.3 (18.9)	−7.1 (19.2)	−3.4 (25.9)	0.1 (32.2)	4.7 (40.5)	7.6 (45.7)	9.7 (49.5)	9.7 (49.5)	6.7 (44.1)	3.1 (37.6)	−1.9 (28.6)	−5.3 (22.5)	1.4 (34.5)
Average precipitation mm (inches)	30 (1.2)	26 (1.0)	25 (1.0)	31 (1.2)	49 (1.9)	66 (2.6)	77 (3.0)	94 (3.7)	48 (1.9)	39 (1.5)	40 (1.6)	31 (1.2)	556 (21.8)
Source: Istituto Superiore per la Protezione e la Ricerca Ambientale (precipitation 1951–1980)
