= Graun im Vinschgau =

Graun im Vinschgau La Carun
- Comune
- Gemeinde Graun im Vinschgau; Comune di Curon Venosta
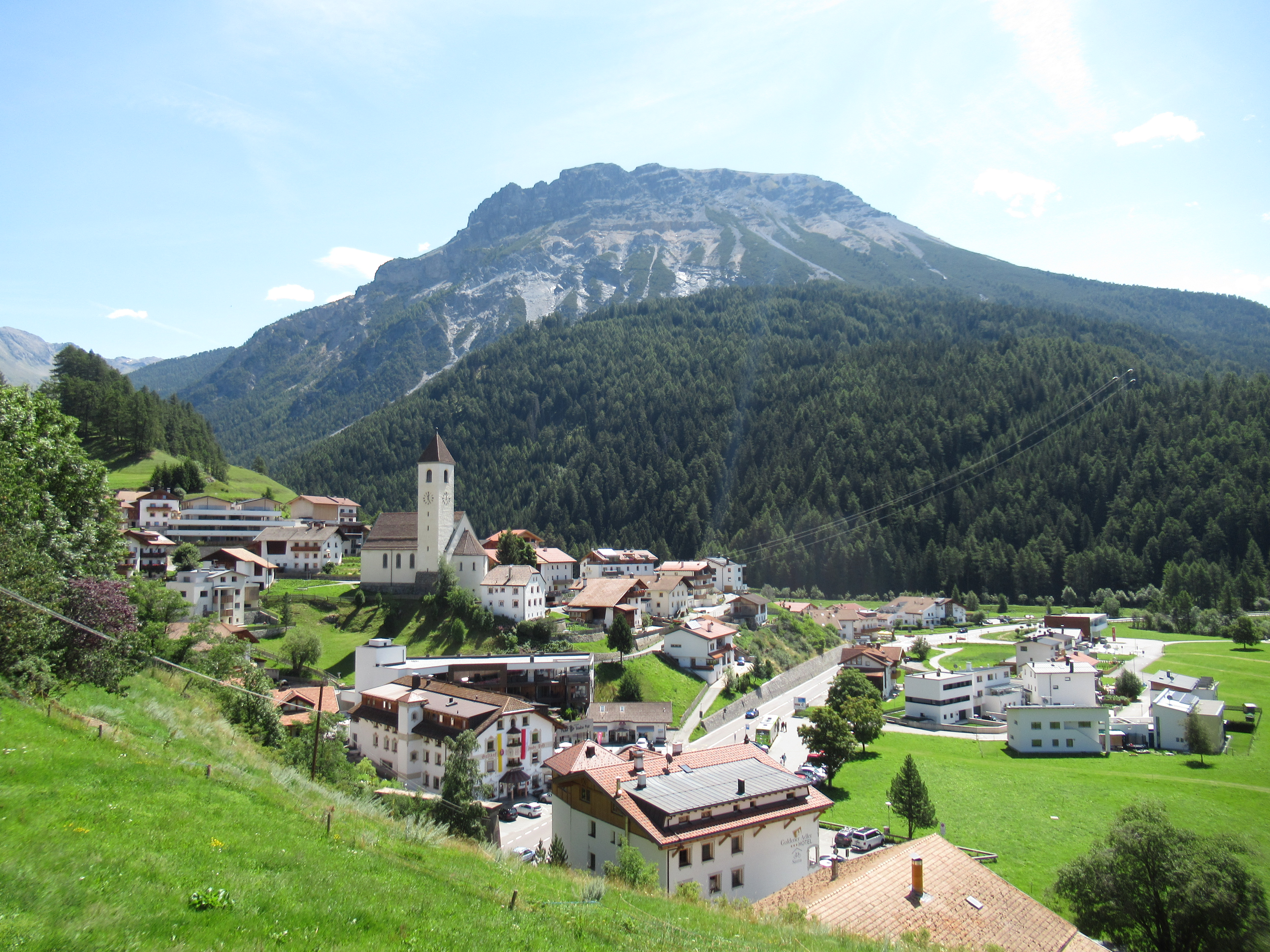
- View of Graun im Vinschgau

- Coat of arms

- Location within Italy Location within Trentino-Alto Adige/Südtirol
- Coordinates: 46°48′N 10°32′E
- Country: Italy
- Region: Trentino-Alto Adige/Südtirol
- Province: South Tyrol (BZ)
- Frazioni: Langtaufers (Vallelunga), Reschen (Resia), St. Valentin (San Valentino alla Muta)

Government
  - Mayor: Franz Alfred Prieth

Area
  - Total: 210.5 km^{2} (81.3 sq mi)
- Elevation: 1,520 m (4,990 ft)

Population (January 2011)
  - Total: 2,447
  - Density: 11.62/km^{2} (30.11/sq mi)
- Demonym(s): German: Grauner; Italian: curonesi
- Time zone: UTC+1 (CET)
  - Summer (DST): UTC+2 (CEST)
- Postal code: 39020
- Dialing code: 0473
- Website: Official website

Graun im Vinschgau (German pronunciation: [ˈɡraʊn ɪm ˈfɪnʃɡaʊ]; Italian: Curon Venosta [kuˈroɱ veˈnɔsta]; Romansh: La Carun) is a comune (municipality) and a village in South Tyrol in northern Italy, located about 70 kilometres (43 mi) northwest of Bolzano, on the border with Austria and Switzerland.

== Geography ==
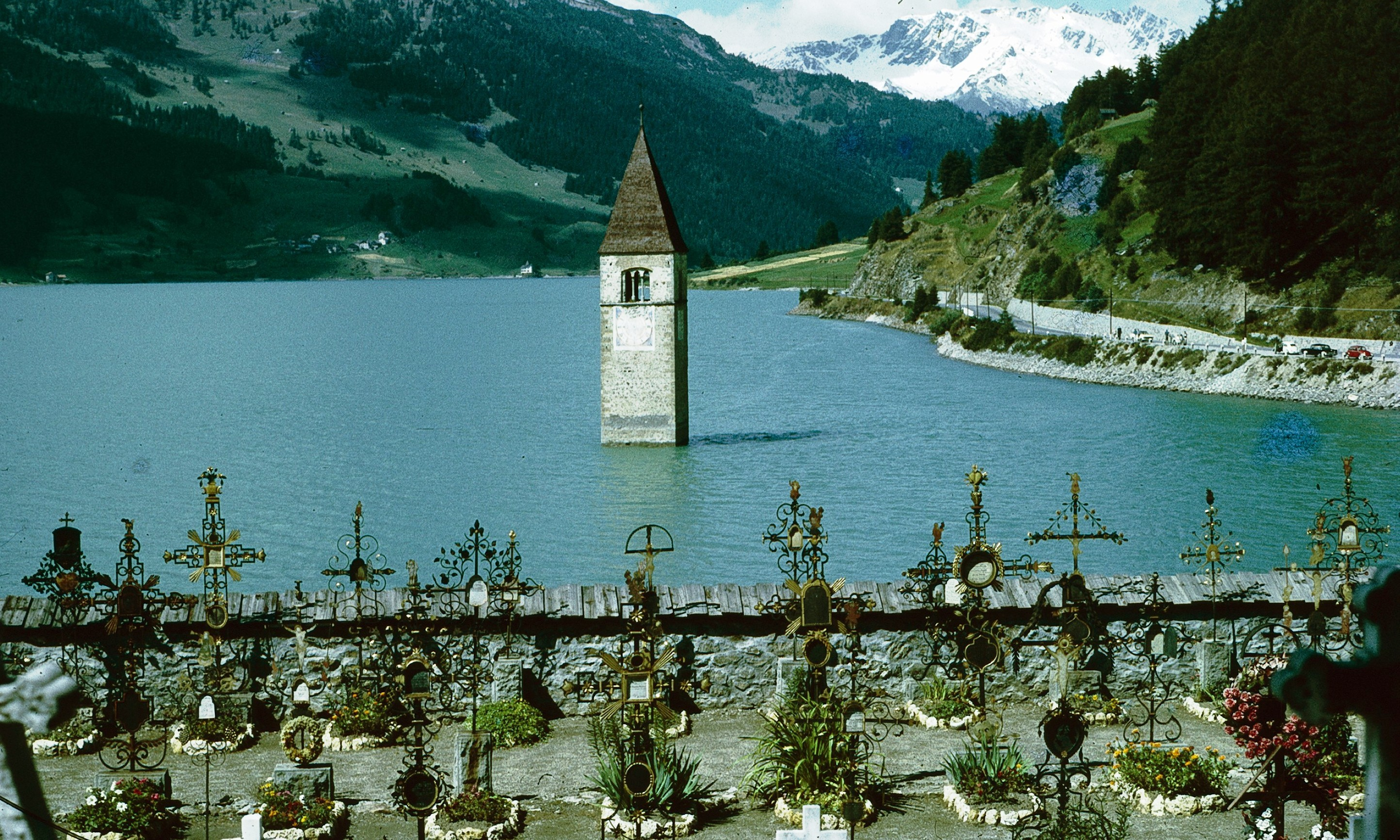
Reschensee with bell tower of the submerged old town; in foreground, new graveyard to which burials were relocated

As of 1 January 2011, it had a registered population of 2,447 and an area of 210.5 square kilometres (81.3 mi^{2}).

The municipality contains the subdivisions Langtaufers (Vallelunga), Reschen (Resia), Rojen (Roja) and St. Valentin auf der Haide (San Valentino alla Muta).

Adjacent municipalities: Mals, Kaunertal (Austria), Nauders (Austria), Pfunds (Austria), Sölden (Austria), Ramosch (Switzerland), Sent (Switzerland), and Tschlin (Switzerland).

The village of Graun borders the Reschensee, which was massively deepened and extended when the valley was dammed in order to produce hydro-electricity. The original village was flooded after the dam's completion in July 1950; it had been abandoned and largely demolished, and Graun was rebuilt on the new shore. As the lone exception, the bell-tower of the 14th-century church was spared from destruction. The tower protrudes above the surface close to the shoreline and has become a landmark; it is the centrepiece of the commune's coat of arms. When water levels fall in the spring, particularly when repairs are made, the ruins of the old village are exposed.

=== Climate ===
Climate data for Melag (Langtaufers): 1915m (1990−2021 normals)
Month	Jan	Feb	Mar	Apr	May	Jun	Jul	Aug	Sep	Oct	Nov	Dec	Year
Record high °C (°F)	12.0 (53.6)	14.0 (57.2)	14.0 (57.2)	18.0 (64.4)	23.9 (75.0)	26.0 (78.8)	27.1 (80.8)	28.0 (82.4)	24.0 (75.2)	21.1 (70.0)	15.2 (59.4)	9.0 (48.2)	28.0 (82.4)
Mean daily maximum °C (°F)	−0.7 (30.7)	1.2 (34.2)	4.0 (39.2)	6.7 (44.1)	11.5 (52.7)	15.8 (60.4)	18.0 (64.4)	17.7 (63.9)	13.5 (56.3)	9.3 (48.7)	3.2 (37.8)	−1.1 (30.0)	8.3 (46.9)
Daily mean °C (°F)	−5.7 (21.7)	−4.8 (23.4)	−1.9 (28.6)	1.3 (34.3)	5.8 (42.4)	9.5 (49.1)	11.5 (52.7)	11.3 (52.3)	7.7 (45.9)	4.1 (39.4)	−1.3 (29.7)	−5.3 (22.5)	2.7 (36.8)
Mean daily minimum °C (°F)	−10.8 (12.6)	−10.8 (12.6)	−7.8 (18.0)	−4.2 (24.4)	0.2 (32.4)	3.3 (37.9)	5.0 (41.0)	5.0 (41.0)	1.9 (35.4)	−1.2 (29.8)	−5.8 (21.6)	−9.5 (14.9)	−2.9 (26.8)
Record low °C (°F)	−23.6 (−10.5)	−29.2 (−20.6)	−24.0 (−11.2)	−18.0 (−0.4)	−12.4 (9.7)	−5.2 (22.6)	−0.7 (30.7)	−2.5 (27.5)	−7.7 (18.1)	−14.7 (5.5)	−19.6 (−3.3)	−23.0 (−9.4)	−29.2 (−20.6)
Average precipitation mm (inches)	43.1 (1.70)	37.6 (1.48)	42.2 (1.66)	38.1 (1.50)	66.3 (2.61)	103.5 (4.07)	107.5 (4.23)	113.6 (4.47)	67.6 (2.66)	63.8 (2.51)	57.6 (2.27)	47.5 (1.87)	788.4 (31.03)
Source: Landeswetterdienst Südtirol

== History ==
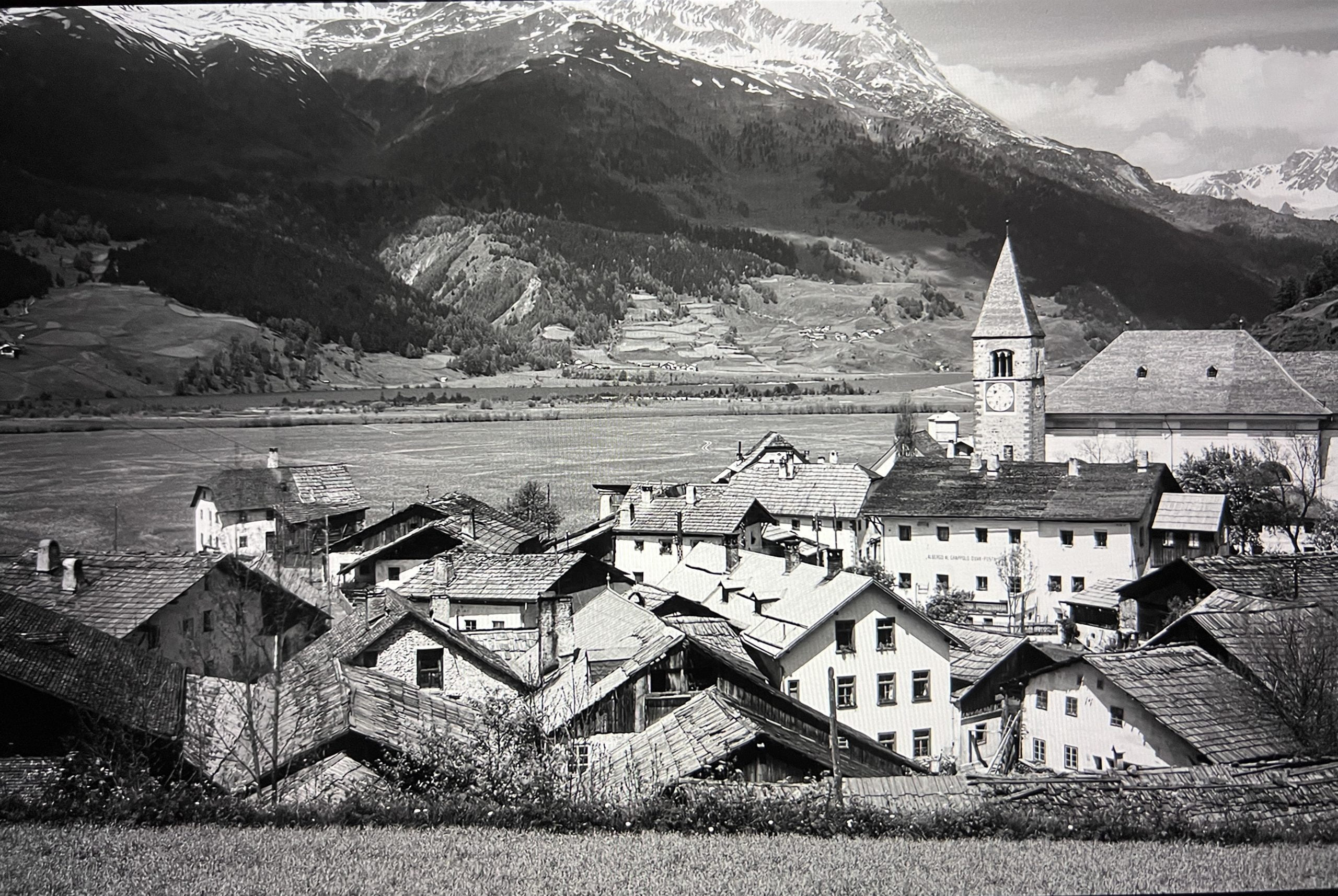
View of the old town before its demolition

In 15 BC the Celtic people then living in the upper Vinschgau valley found themselves incorporated into the Roman Empire following the construction of a commercial and military route crossing the Alps via what is now known as the Reschen Pass, the route then being called the "Via Claudia Augusta".

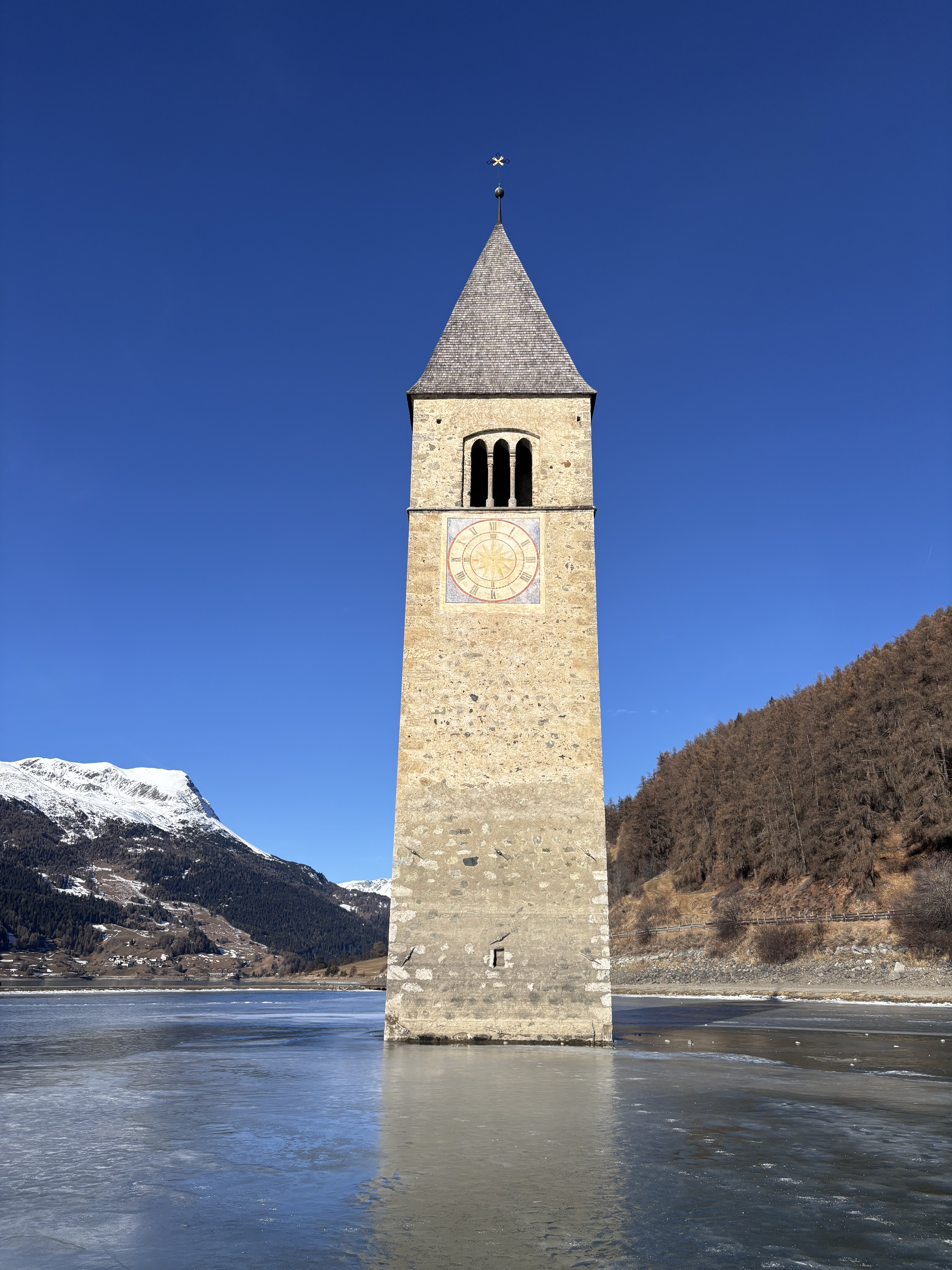

The transalpine route retained its importance through the medieval period, being variously called the "Upper Way" (Oberer Weg / Via Superiore) or the "Swabia Road" (Schwabenweg / Via di Svevia).

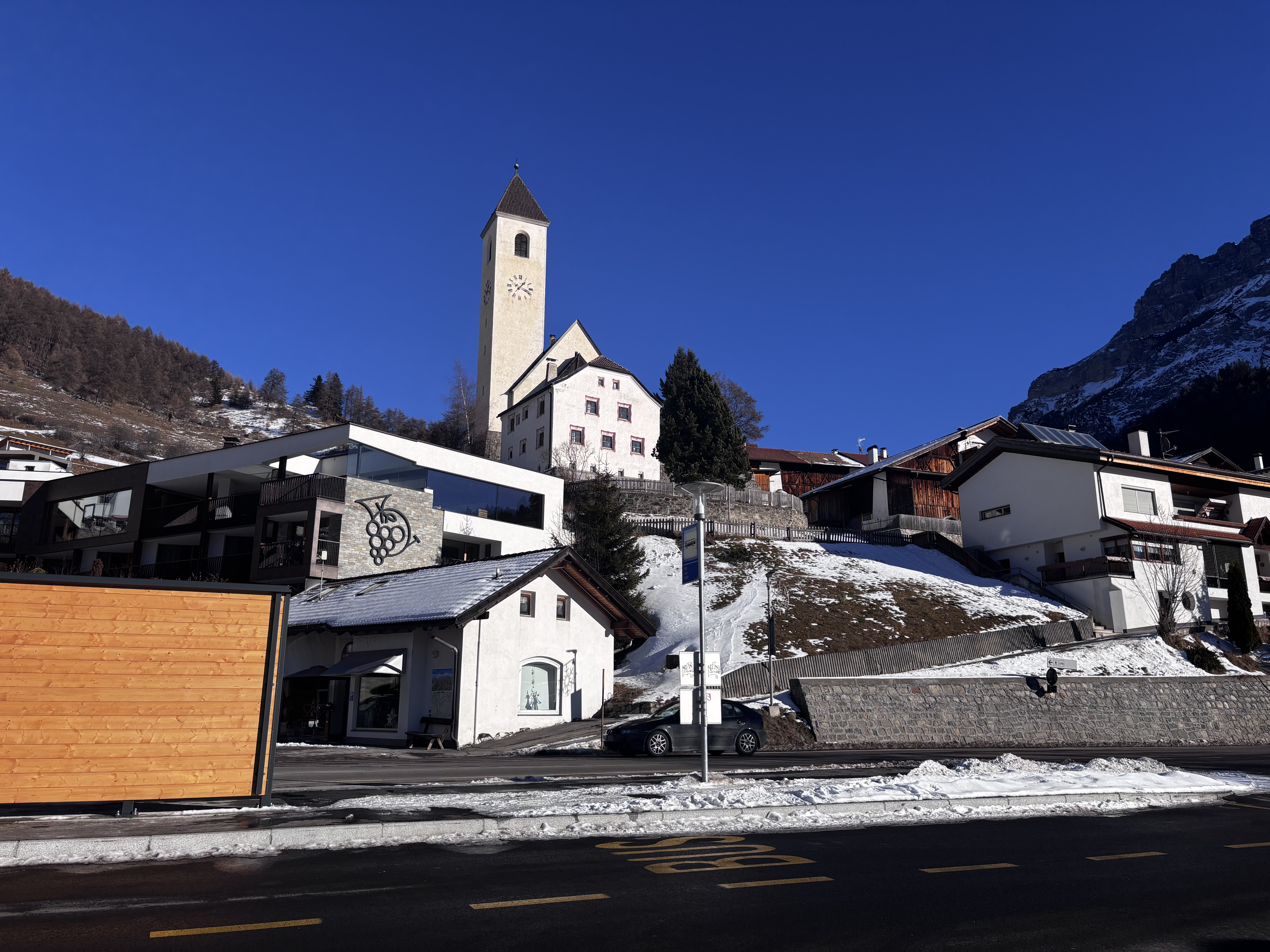
View of the town in 2024

After 450, a wave of Christian missionaries arrived from Chur. By the time of the Black death (1348), from which most of the population of the time died, most of the Vinschgau Valley, including Graun, had been settled by German speakers; the exception being the side valley of Müstair, where the Romansh language survives to this day. German has remained the majority language in Graun since and as of 2011 German was the first language for more than 97% of its population.

=== Coat-of-arms ===
The escutcheon is party per fess, azure on the bottom and argent on the upper part, separated by a thin vert stripe. At the center is shown a gray bell tower, with three windows and an azure point, representing the church bell tower still visible in the lake after the construction of the dam. The emblem was granted in 1967.

== Society ==
=== Linguistic distribution ===
According to the 2024 census, 97.35% of the population speak German, 2.60% Italian and 0.04% Ladin as first language.

=== Demographic evolution ===
Historical population

Year	Pop.	±%
1860	?	—
1870	?	—
1880	2,269	—
1900	?	—
1910	2,154	—

Year	Pop.	±%
1921	2,342	+8.7%
1931	2,350	+0.3%
1936	2,372	+0.9%
1951	2,125	−10.4%
1961	2,187	+2.9%

Year	Pop.	±%
1971	2,258	+3.2%
1981	2,361	+4.6%
1991	2,331	−1.3%
2001	2,379	+2.1%
2011	2,447	+2.9%

Source: Data from ISTAT

== Transportation ==
The municipality is served by public bus. Destinations include Mals to the south; and Nauders, Austria; and Martina, Switzerland, to the north.

== In popular culture ==
The supernatural drama television series Curon was primarily shot in the town and the surrounding locations.
