= Summit cross =

Cross on the summit of a mountain

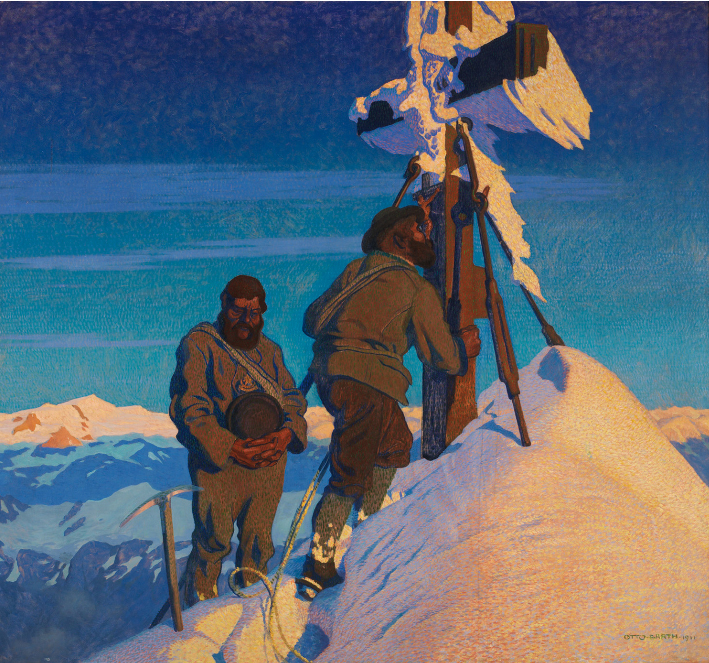
Otto Barth (1876–1916), Morning prayers by the Kalser alpine guides on the Großglockner, oil on canvas, 1911

A summit cross is a Christian cross on the summit of a mountain or hill that marks the top. Often there will be a summit register (Gipfelbuch) at the cross, either in a container or other weatherproof case.

The practice originated in the German Alps, where it is known as a German: Gipfelkreuz. Various other forms of marking or symbol such as cairns, prayer flags or ovoos may be found around the world on passes and hills, especially sacred mountains. In the Italian Alps and other places, a Madonna is sometimes placed at the summit instead of a cross.

== Description ==
Summit crosses are normally about two to four metres high and are usually made of wood or metal. In April 2010, the world's first glass summit cross was erected on the Schartwand (2,339 m) in Salzburg's Tennengebirge mountains. Summit crosses are mainly found in Catholic regions of the Alps, especially in Austria, Switzerland and Bavaria, mountainous regions of Poland, but also in America, in areas with both Protestant and Catholic populations. In Slovenia, summit crosses were traditionally placed on mountaintops as symbols of faith, but their numbers were limited during the communist regime in Yugoslavia. They usually stand on mountains whose summits are above the tree line, but they are also found in the German Central Uplands, for example in the Black Forest on the Herzogenhorn.

== History ==
The tradition of a summit cross probably started in early Christian times, possibly linked to pilgrimage and monasticism, albeit unrecorded. By the end of the 13th century, a few large crosses had been erected in passes and on hills. Examples from this period include the Confin Cross in St. Valentin on the Mals Heath, which also acted as a boundary marker, or crosses on the Arlberg, the Gardena Pass or Birnlücke. An early example of a large cross, visible from the valley floor, being set up on a mountain top, occurred during the first successful climb of Mont Aiguille in 1492, when three crosses were put up at the corner of the summit plateau. In the 16th century crosses were erected with increasing frequency on mountain peaks, especially for the purpose of marking alpine pasture and municipal boundaries. In the 17th century, especially during the Thirty Years' War, these religious symbols gained importance. The crosses of this period were mostly simple wooden ones hewn from branches found near the site, or house crucifixes. During this time crosses were often made with two cross beams in the form of so-called patriarchal crosses (or Scheyern crosses). These "weather crosses" were intended to supersede the old pagan superstitions associated with thunder, storm and hail. Further layers of Christian imagery as perceived by the Romantic generation made summit crosses a motif favoured by the painter Caspar David Friedrich in more than one of his mystic landscapes.

During the 19th century the summits of many mountains were adorned with what were usually simple, wooden crosses during the course of mountaineering expeditions or survey work, both of which were on the increase. Large summit crosses in the modern sense — that is, pieces designed specifically for mountaintops by expert craftsmen — were not really introduced until the end of the 19th century. One known exception is that of the Kleinglockner and Grossglockner, which were given large summit crosses in 1799 and 1800 as part of their first ascent. These crosses, in addition to their religious importance, also served scientific functions as lightning conductors, and bases for meteorological instruments such as barometers. During the 19th century, there were several attempts to erect secular symbols such as pyramids, obelisks or flags instead of crosses, usually dedicated to secular rulers. One example was the construction of the so-called Emperor Obelisk on the Ortler in 1888. The 20th century introduced modern materials and technology: a summit cross erected in 1977 on Carrauntoohil, the highest summit in Ireland, originally featured a windmill that powered lightbulbs on the cross.

What summit crosses may express can be exemplified by those erected and re-erected on the comparatively insignificant Butte de Warlencourt, a pre-Christian tumulus on the Somme, only some 20m above the surrounding terrain but a scene of intense fighting during World War I, when it was the objective of costly and fruitless British attacks during the battle of the Somme: "this pagan memorial was Christianized by bombardment and large numbers of dead," and claimed with first a British cross (1917), then a German one (1918), the latter being removed during the interwar period and replaced by soldiers of the Wehrmacht, in "a symbolic conflict of ownership fought with cruciform images."

The erection of summit crosses experienced a boom in the early 20th century. After the First World War and even after the Second World War, many new crosses were erected. Communities often organized this sometimes very expensive and logistically difficult task on very high mountain peaks in the memory of the fallen, and war veterans in particular were often involved in their installation. A superlative example is the Heroes' Cross on Caraiman Peak, in the Bucegi Mountains of Romania at an altitude of 2291m — the largest construction of this sort in the world (as recognized in 2013 by the Guinness World Records). Built between 1926 and 1928 to honor fallen heroes of the First World War, great efforts were put into its construction, the location being so high and so remote. Marie of Edinburgh, Queen of Romania, and King Ferdinand of Romania initiated and supervised its construction, supported by war veterans' associations, local businesses and many local volunteers. The Cross is 36m high, with its horizontal arms spanning 14m; it has many lightbulbs covering its entire face on the Prahova Valley side, and at commissioning had an electrical generator in its base enabling its light to be seen from a great distance. Nowadays, it is connected to the electrical grid. Under the Communist regime, it was endangered by plans to transform it into a totally different symbol, by removing the horizontal arms and adding a red star on top.

Another famous example from this period is the cross at the Zuckerhütl, whose construction in 1947 was dramatized on film a year later. Today, summit crosses are often put up by the local tourist association or branch of the Alpine Club.

== Gallery ==
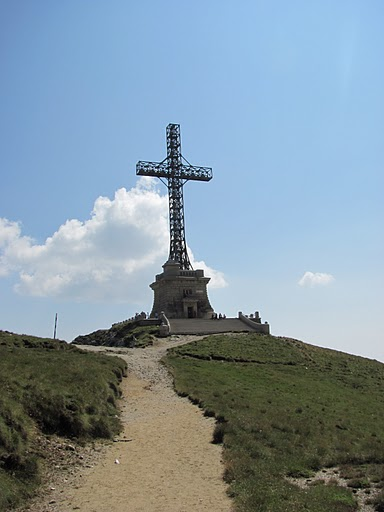
Heroes' Cross, largest summit cross in the world, on Caraiman Peak, Romania

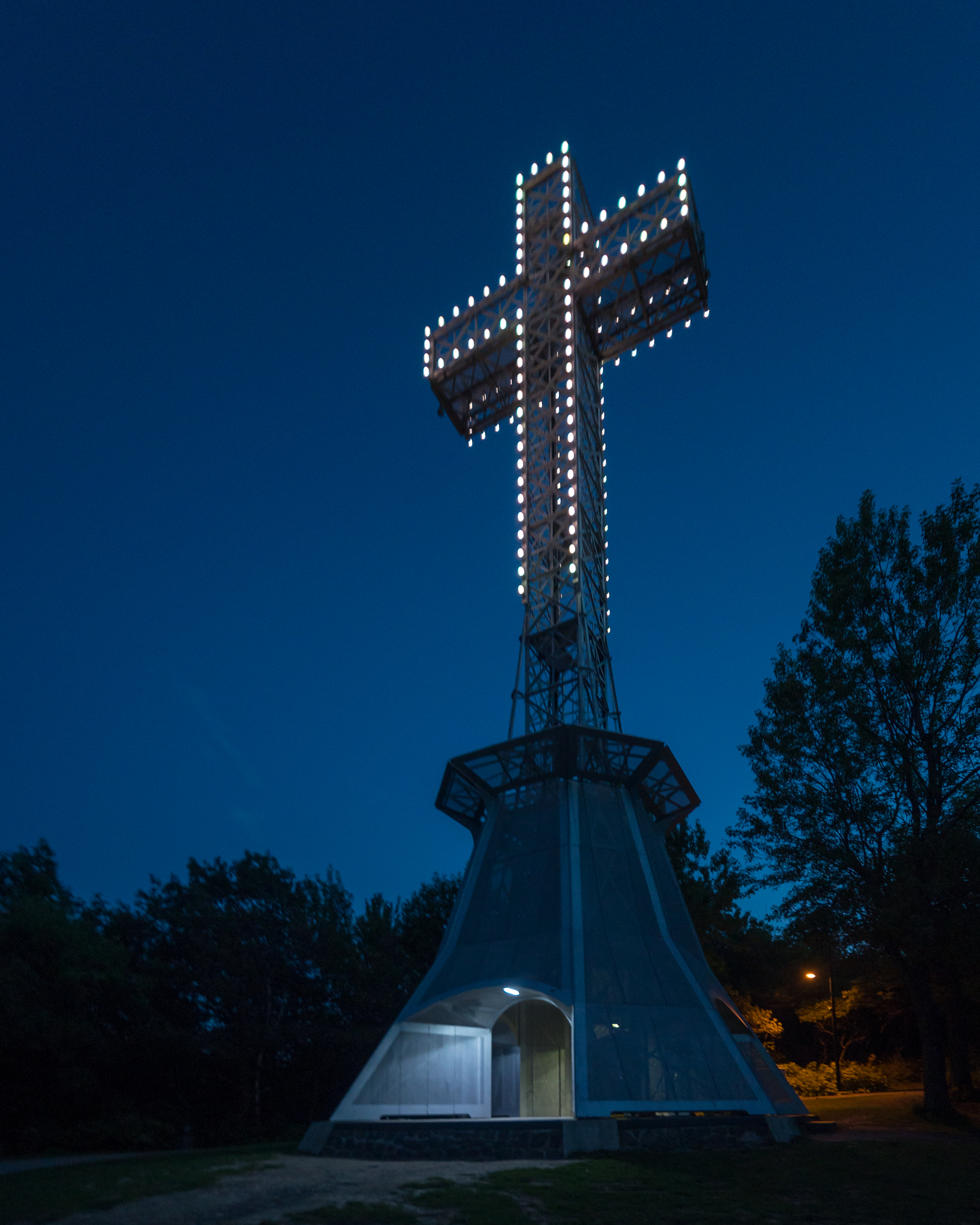
Mount Royal, Montreal, Canada

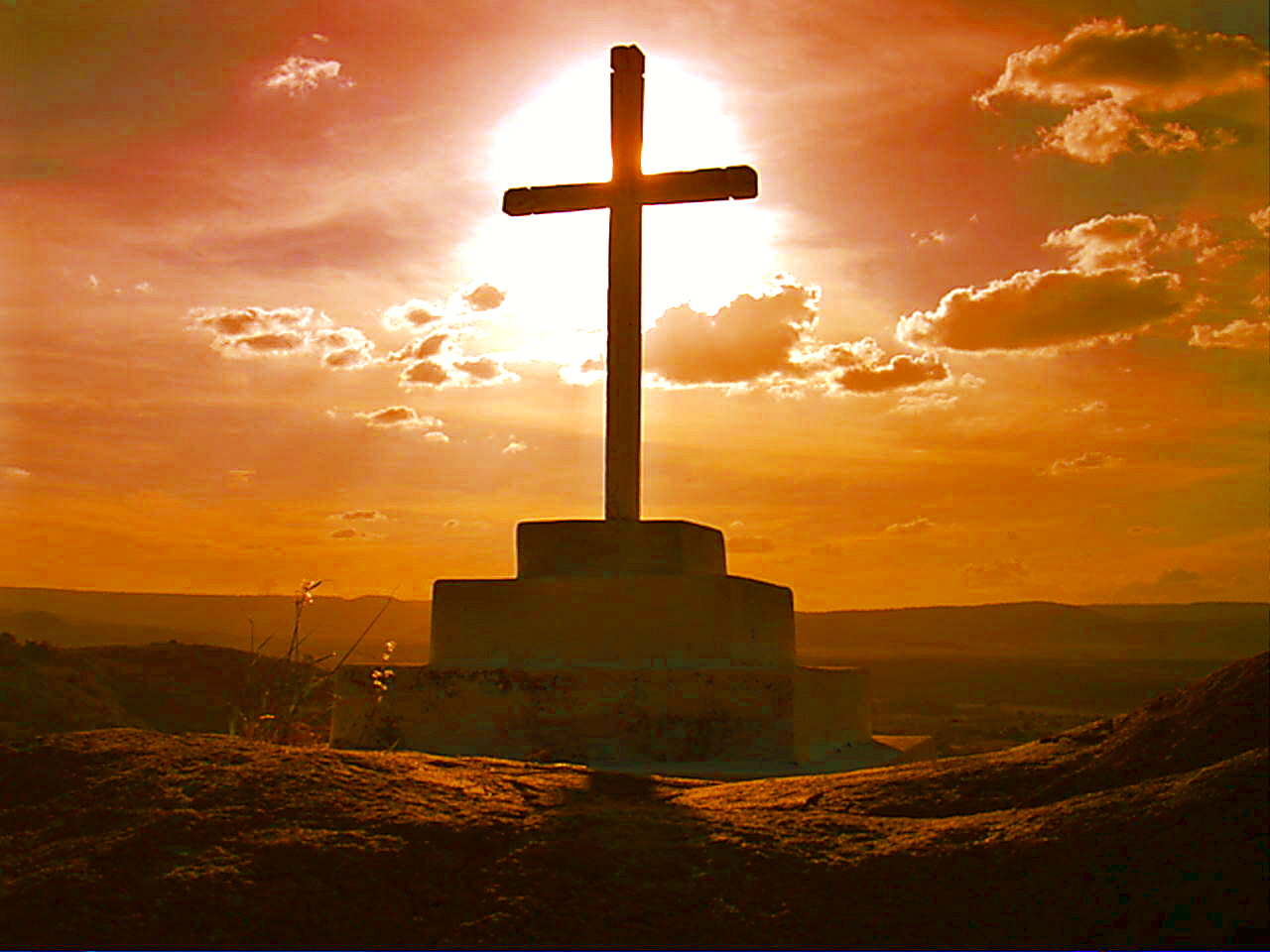
Belém, Paraíba, Brazil

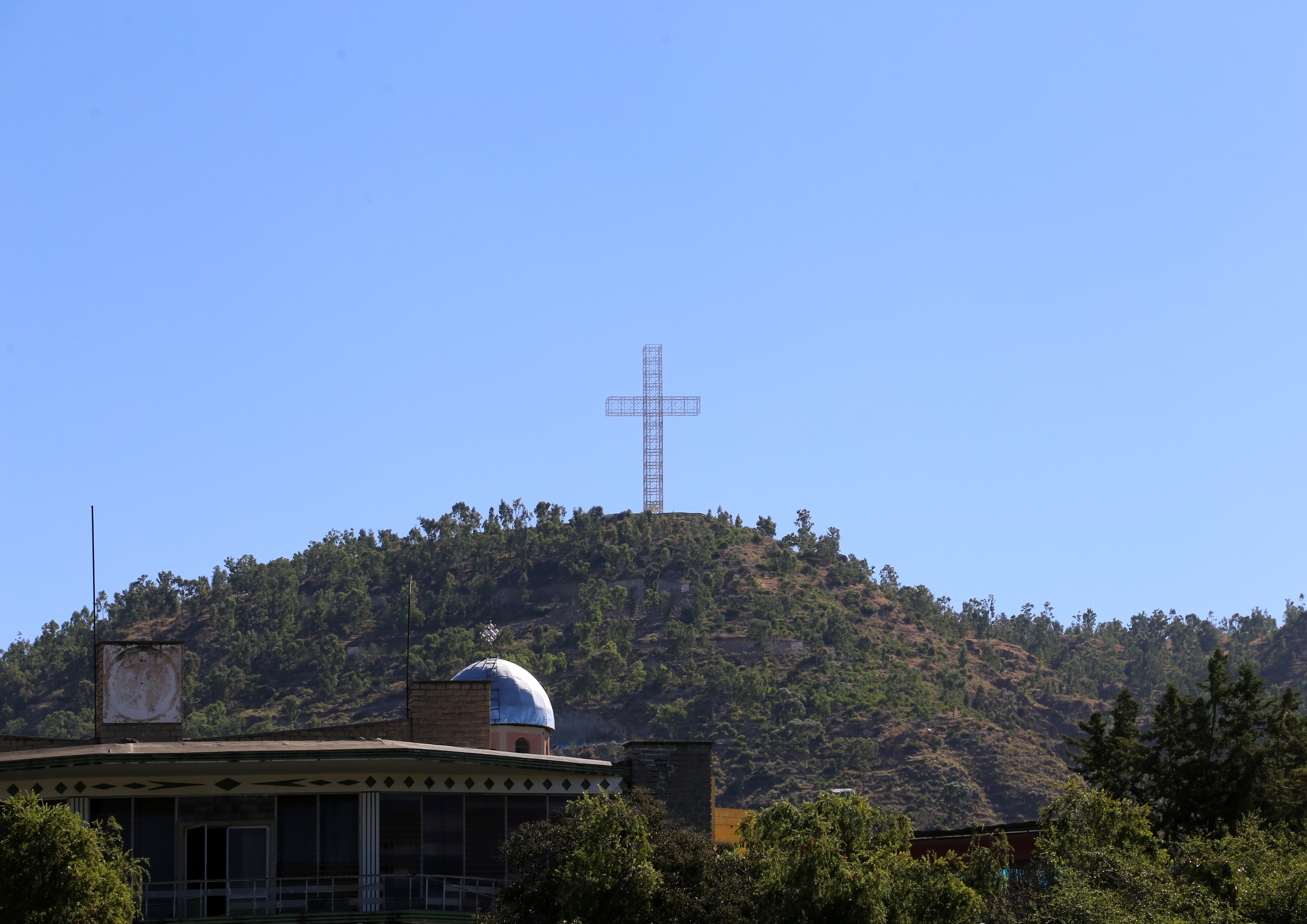
Mekele, Ethiopia

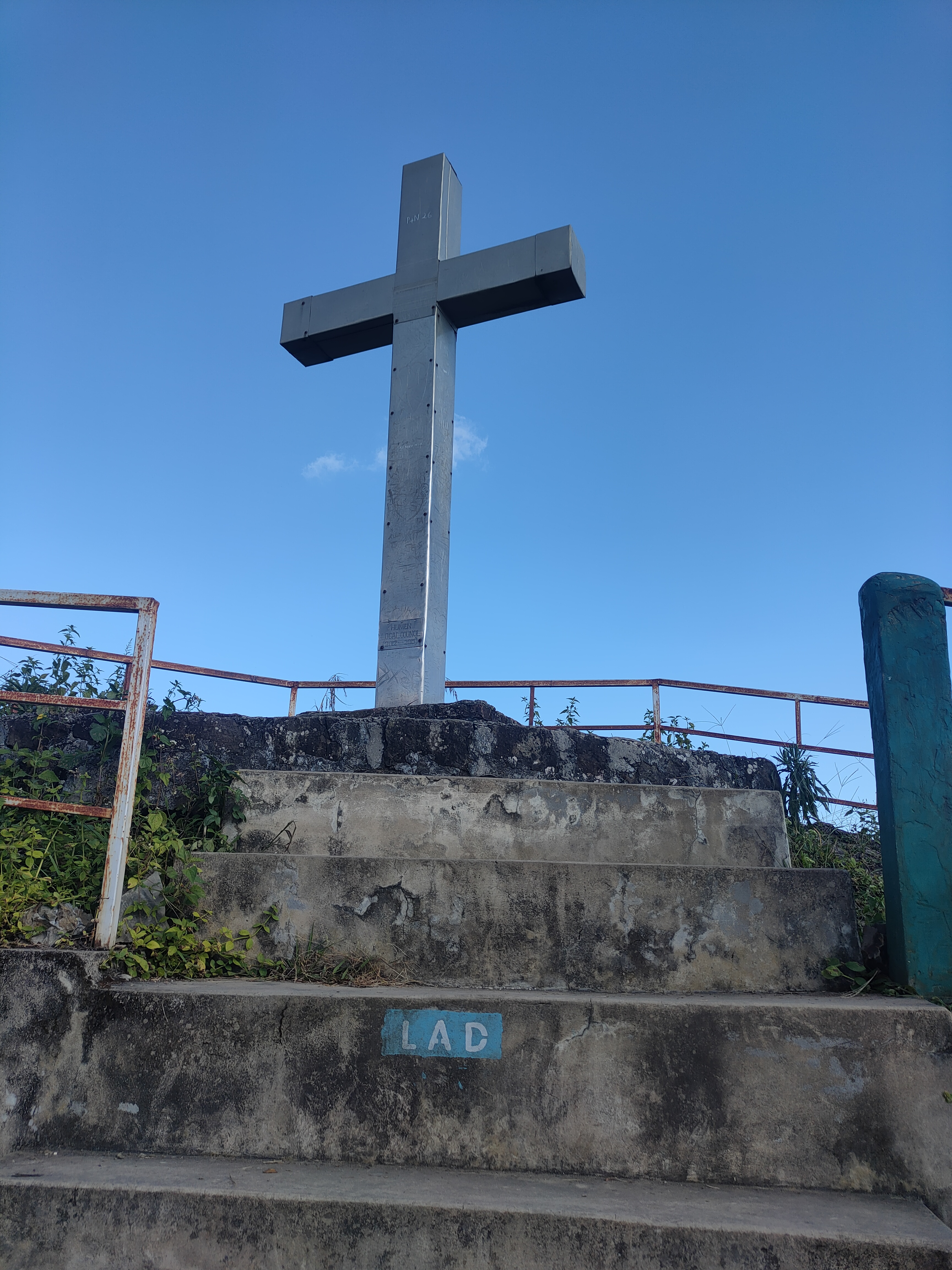
Lalsavunga Park, near Aizawl, India.

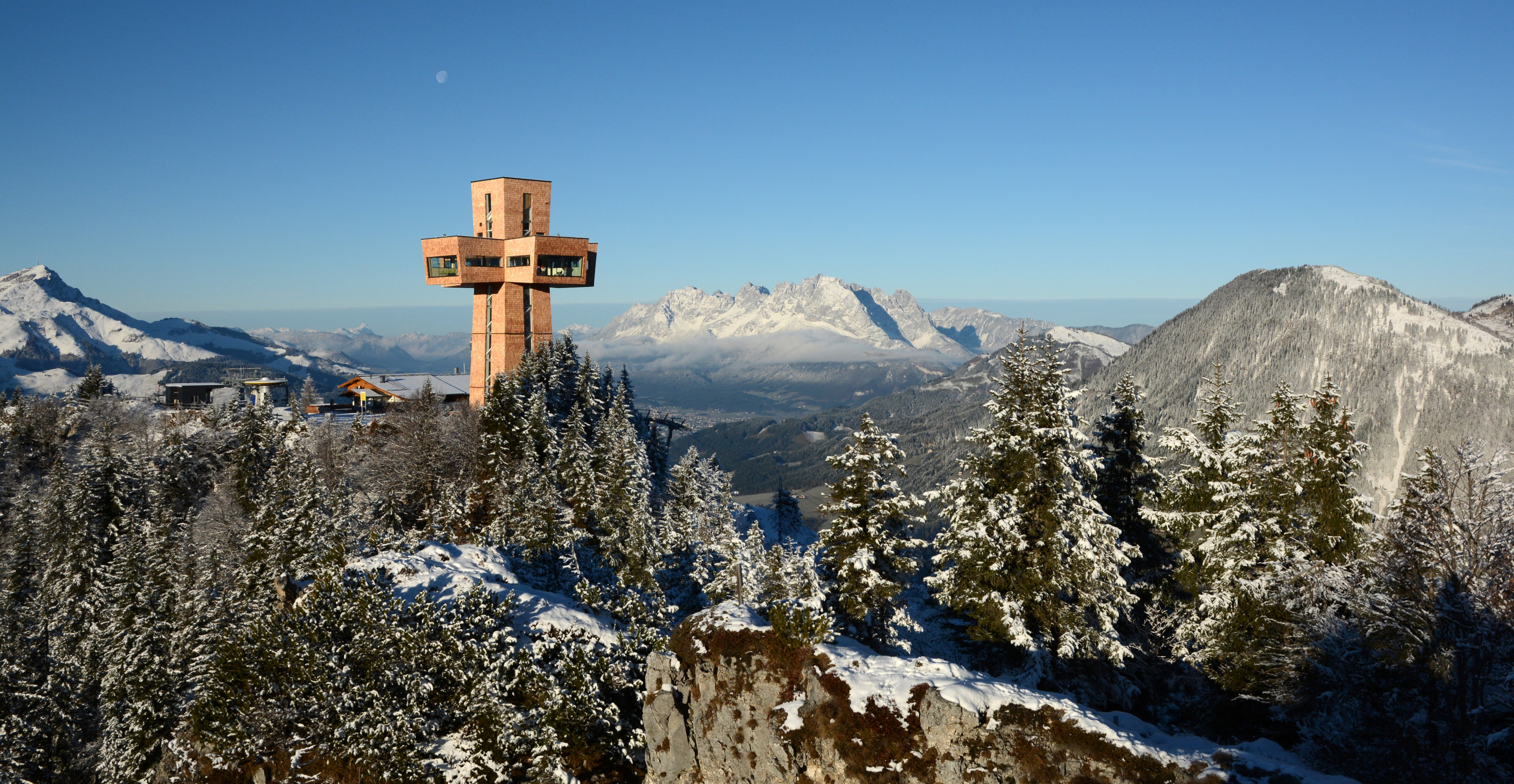
The "St. James' Cross", Pillerseetal, Tyrol

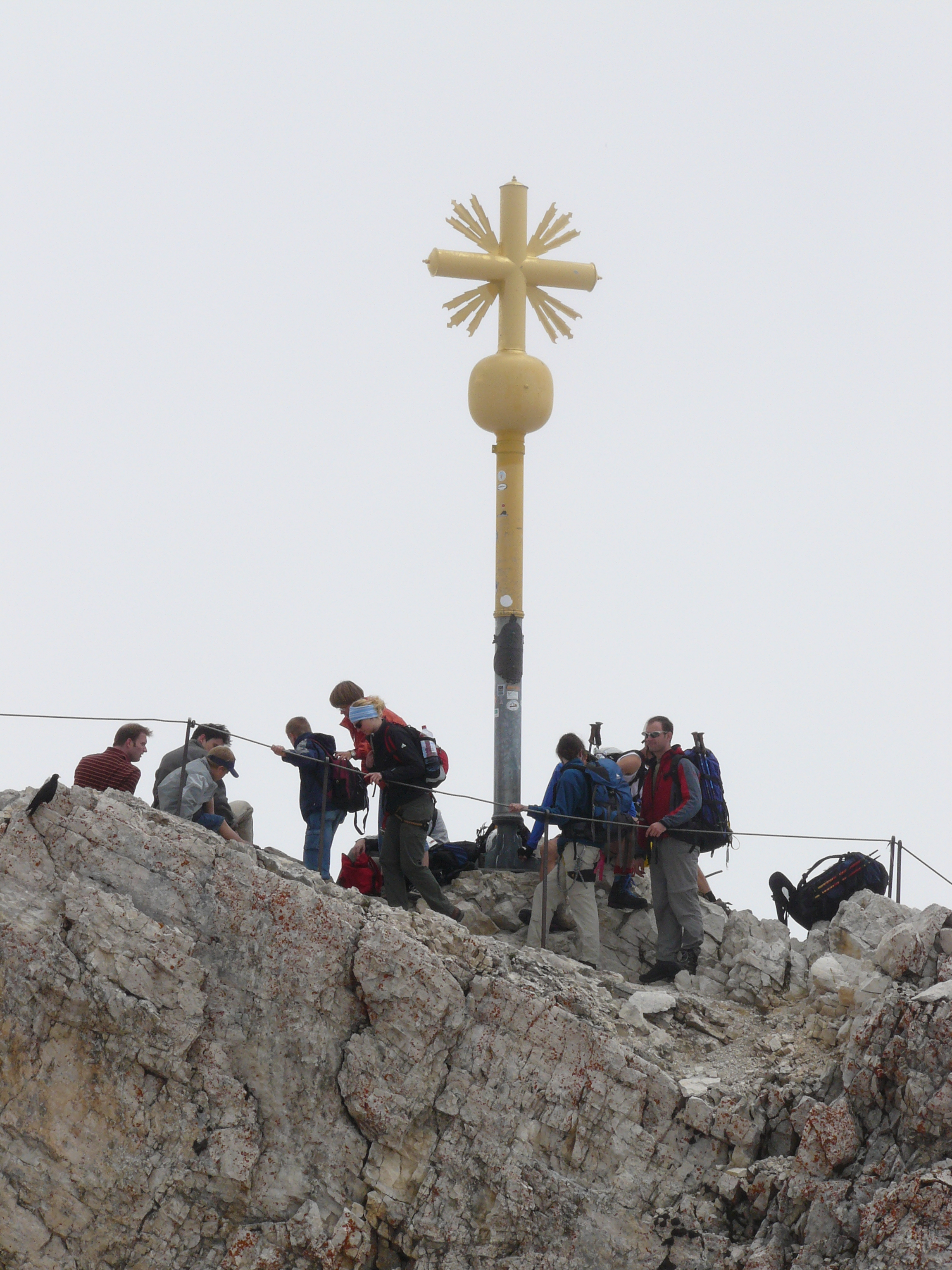
Zugspitze, Germany

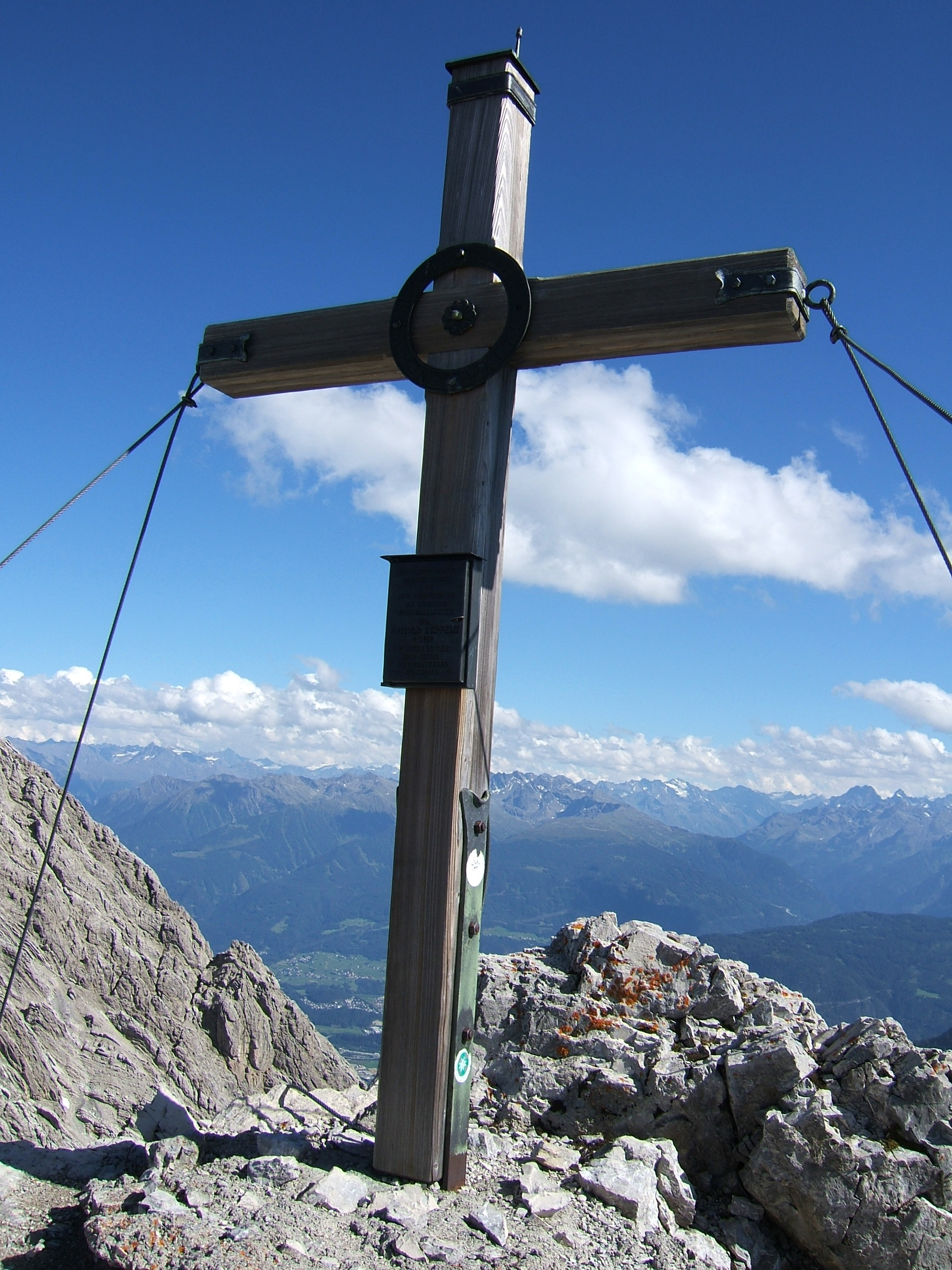
Maldonkopf, Lechtal Alps

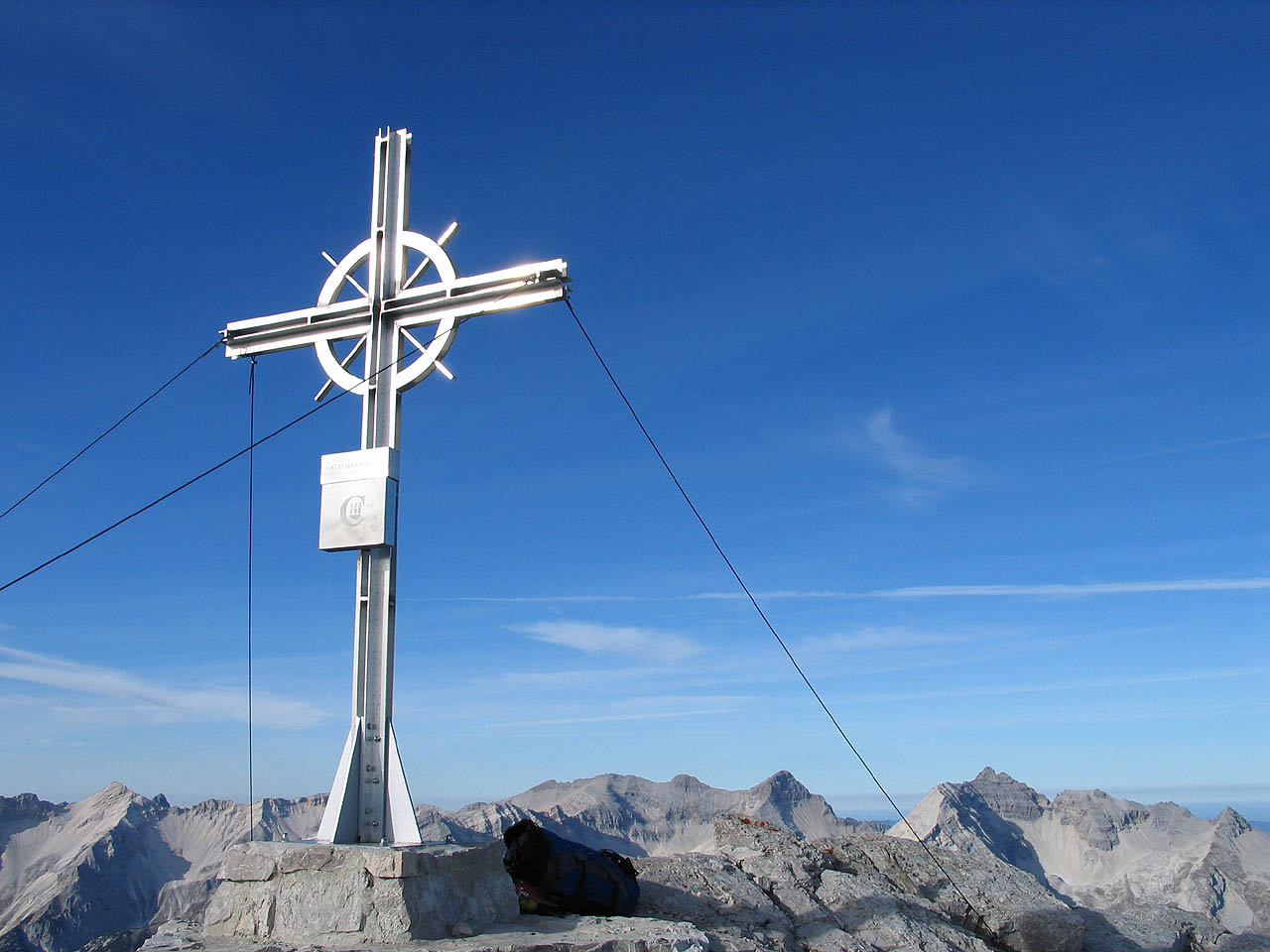
Hintere Bachofenspitze, Karwendel Alps

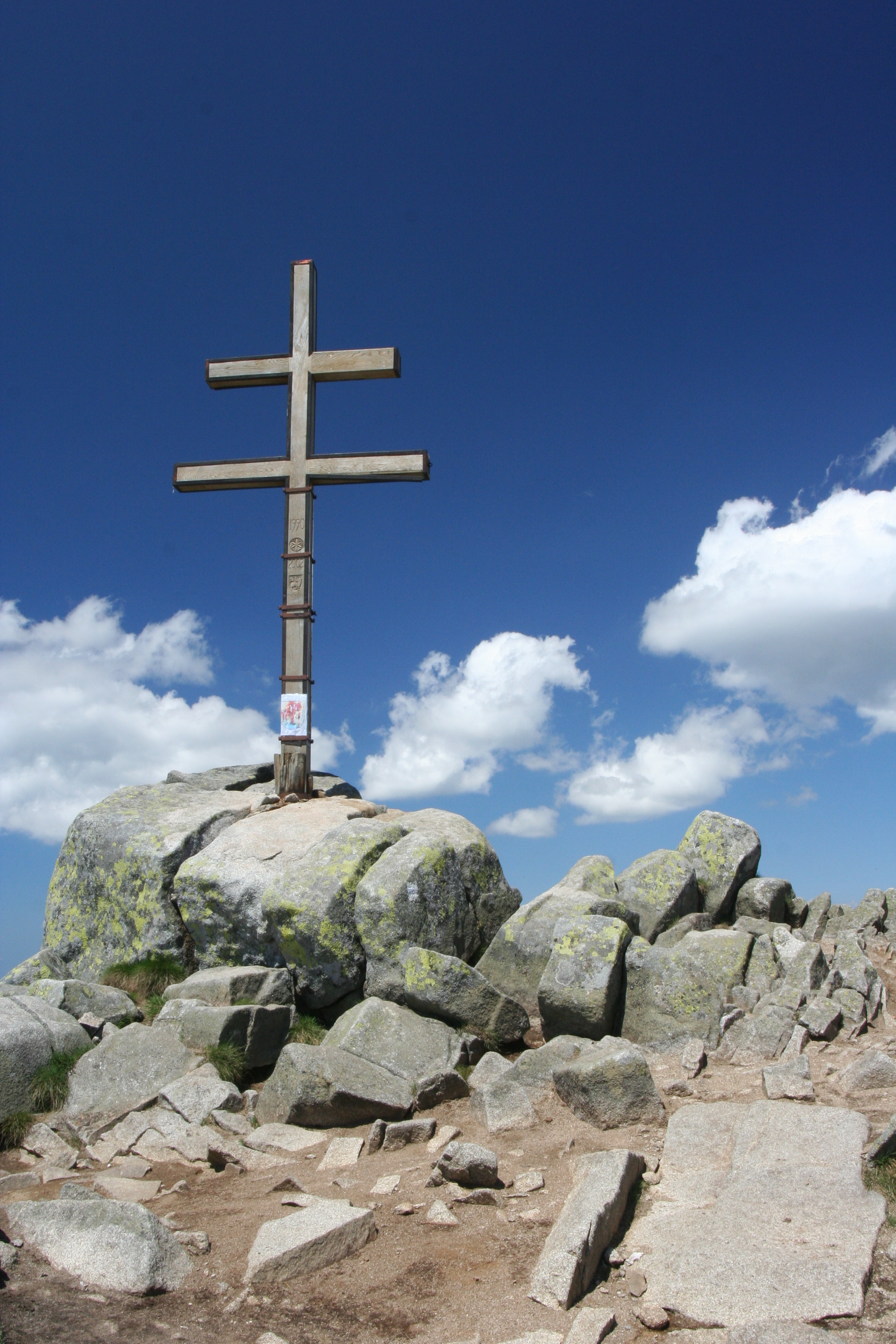
Scheyernkreuz cross on the Dumbier, Slovakia

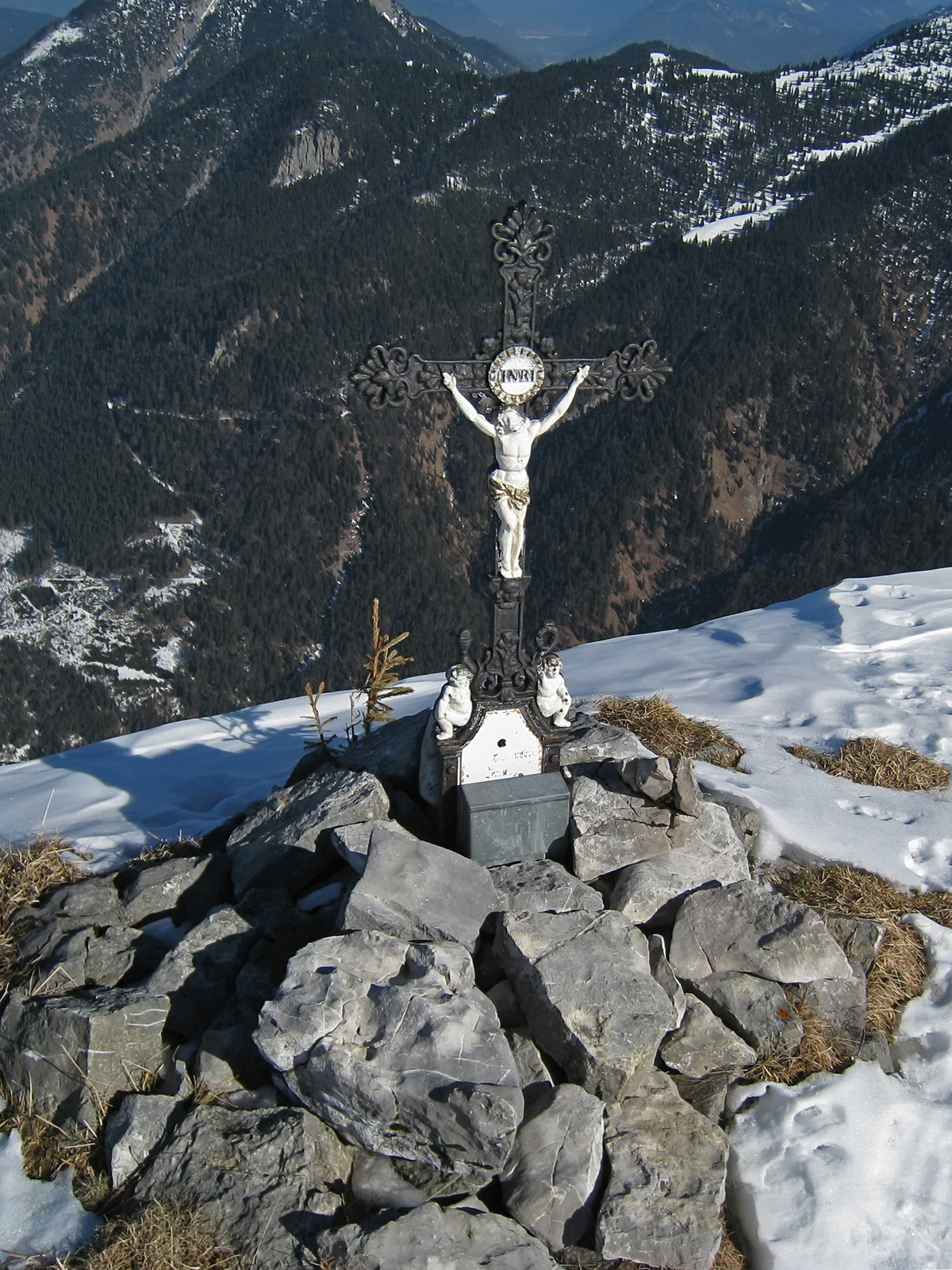
Vorderskopf, Karwendel

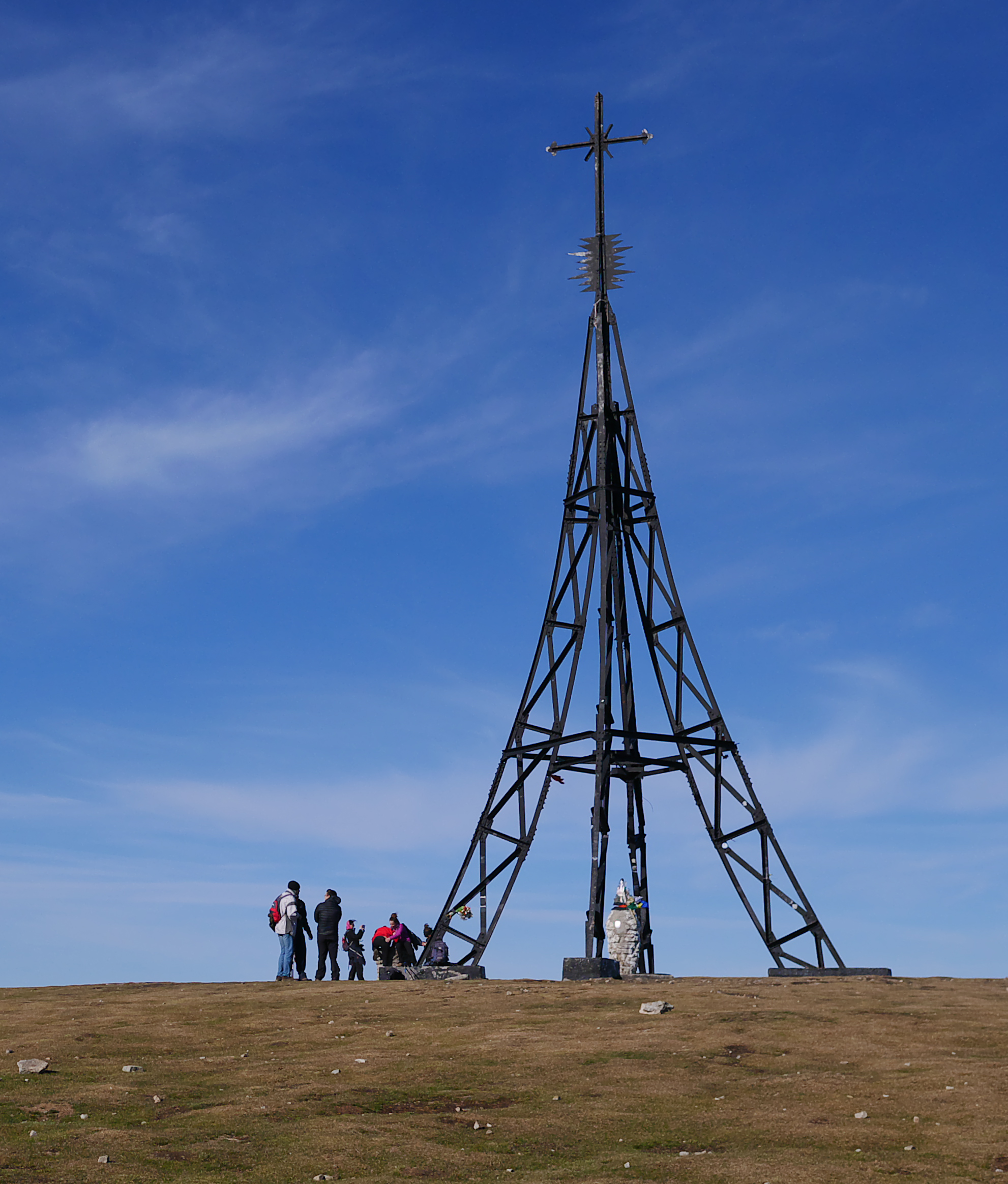
Gorbea, Spanish Basque country

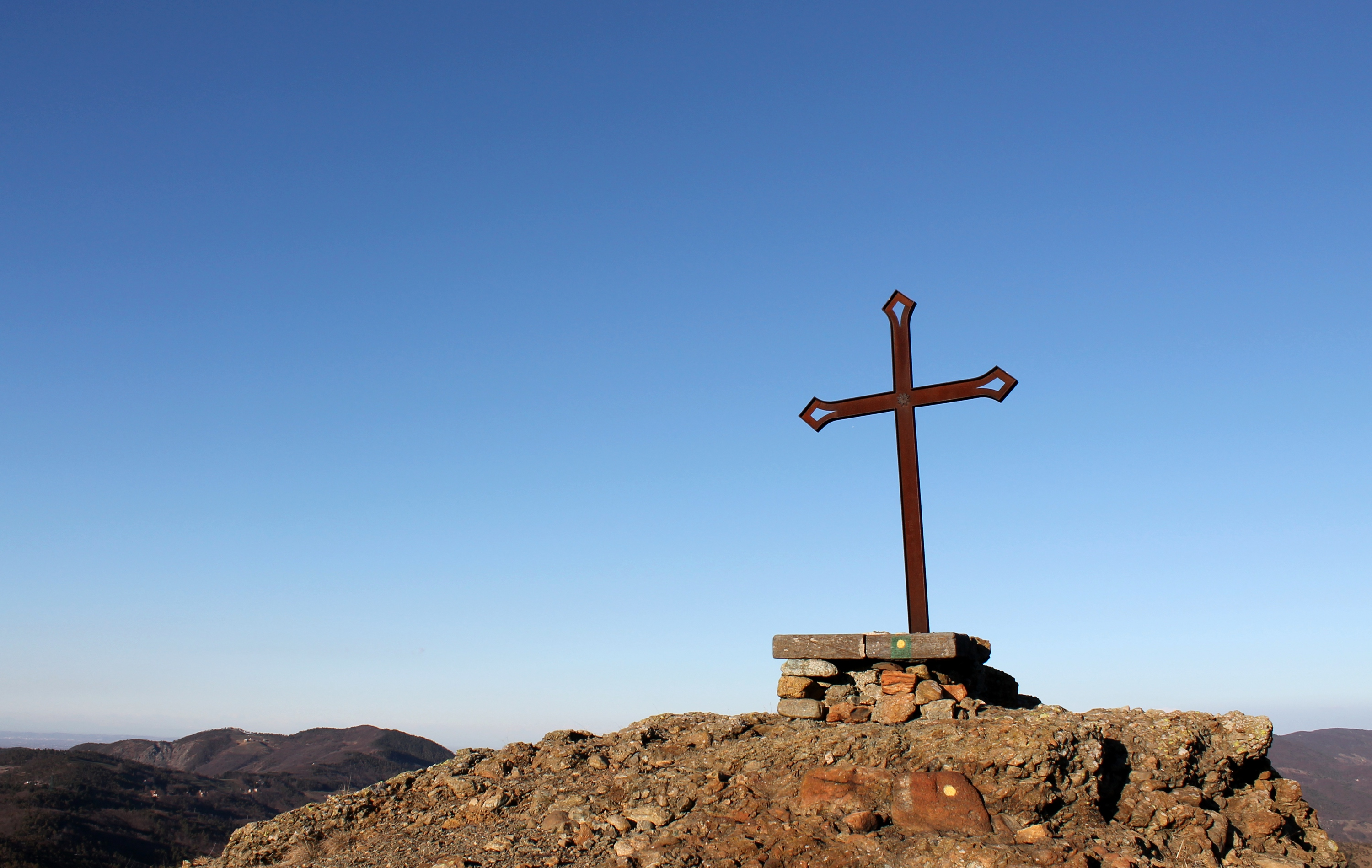
Montecalvo, Italy

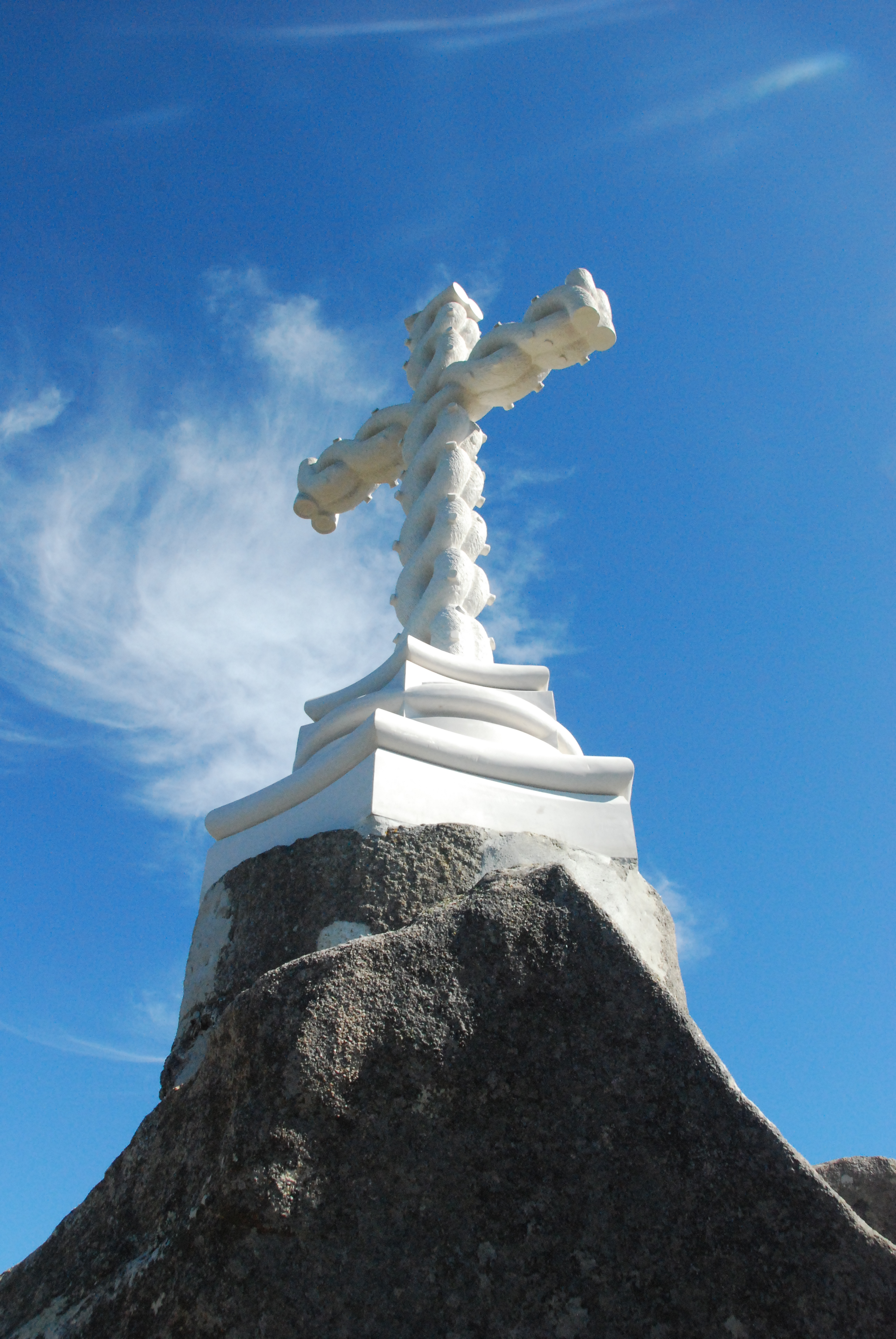
Sintra Mountains, Portugal.

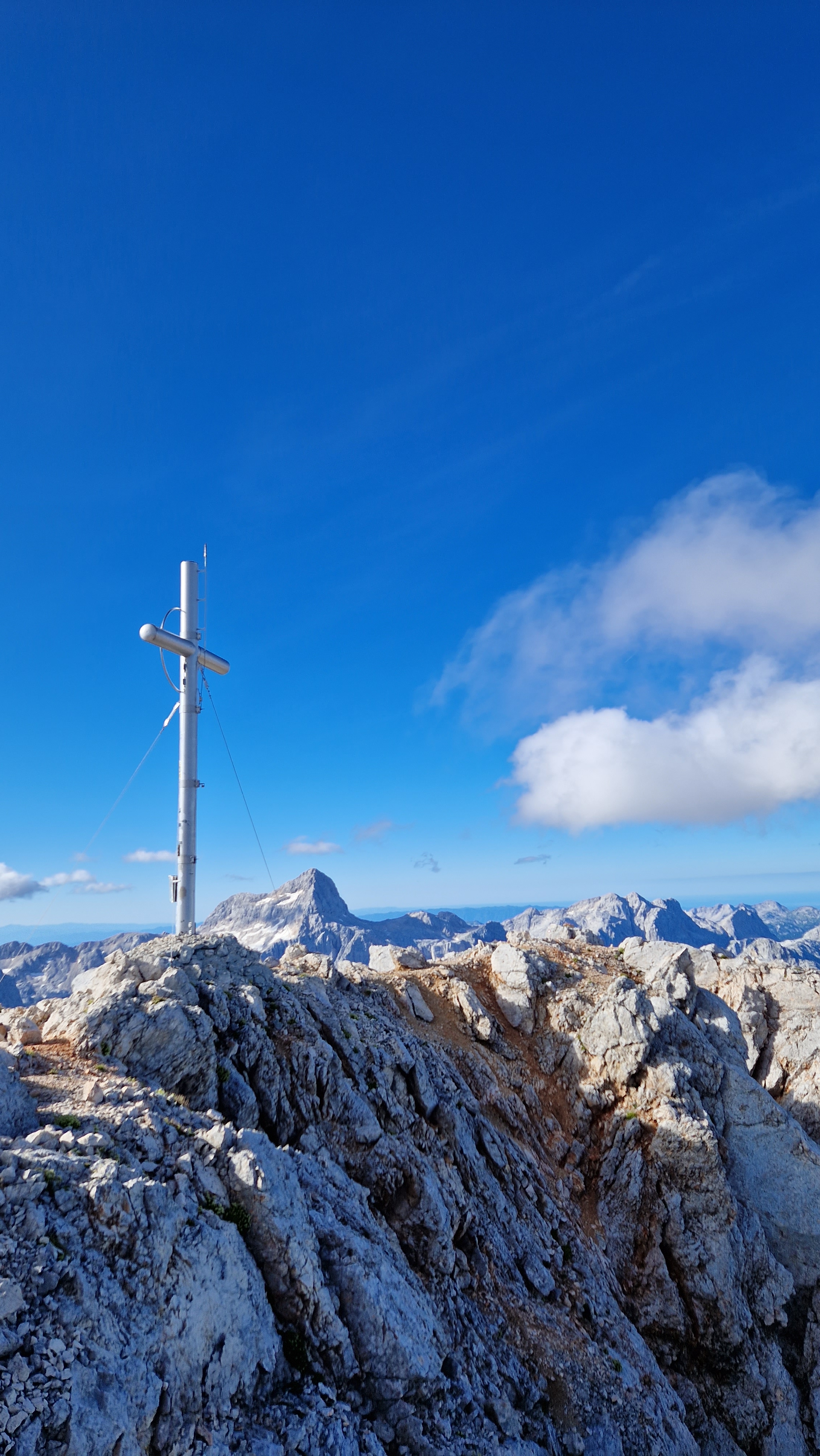
Škrlatica, Slovenia.

== See also ==
- List of tallest crosses in the world
- Wayside cross
- Wayside shrine

== Sources ==
- Werner, Paul (1991). „Zum Beweise, daß wir dagewesen …“ Zur Geschichte unserer Gipfelkreuze. In: Ars Bavarica. 63/64, p. 112–143.
- Werner, Paul and Werner, Richhilde (1991). Vom Marterl bis zum Gipfelkreuz. Flurdenkmale in Oberbayern. Plenk, Berchtesgaden, ISBN 3-922590-62-4.
- Mathis, Claudia (Paganini, Claudia) (2007). Dem Himmel nah … Von Gipfelkreuzen und Gipfelsprüchen. 2. Auflage. Berenkamp, Innsbruck, ISBN 978-3-85093-149-6.
