= Chlorodynerus =

Scientific classification
- Kingdom: Animalia
- Phylum: Arthropoda
- Class: Insecta
- Order: Hymenoptera
- Family: Vespidae
- Subfamily: Eumeninae
- Genus: Chlorodynerus; Blüthgen, 1951

Species
- See text

Genus of wasps

Chlorodynerus is an Old World genus of potter wasps. The following species are included in this genus:

- Chlorodynerus araxanus (Blüthgen, 1956)
- Chlorodynerus arenicola (Kostylev, 1935)
- Chlorodynerus biskrensis (Blüthgen, 1954)
- Chlorodynerus castrorum (Blüthgen, 1954)
- Chlorodynerus chloroticus (Spinola, 1838)
- Chlorodynerus deesanus (Cameron, 1907)
- Chlorodynerus diglaensis (Blüthgen, 1954)
- Chlorodynerus flavoferrugineus Giordani Soika, 1970
- Chlorodynerus geometricus (Giordani Soika, 1940)
- Chlorodynerus guichardi Giordani Soika, 1974
- Chlorodynerus gratus (Kostylev, 1940)
- Chlorodynerus horni (Giordani Soika, 1935)
- Chlorodynerus incisipes (Kostylev, 1935)
- Chlorodynerus infrenis Giordani Soika, 1970
- Chlorodynerus intricatus Giordani Soika, 1957
- Chlorodynerus kelidopterus (Kohl, 1906)
- Chlorodynerus lamaosensis (Schulthess, 1934)
- Chlorodynerus lamellipes (Giordani Soika, 1940)
- Chlorodynerus loeffleri Giordani Soika, 1957
- Chlorodynerus mackenseni (Dusmet, 1917)
- Chlorodynerus maidli (Giordani Soika, 1934)
- Chlorodynerus mochii Giordani Soika, 1957
- Chlorodynerus sanctus (Blüthgen, 1954)
- Chlorodynerus schulthessianus (Kostylev, 1936)
- Chlorodynerus somalus Giordani Soika, 1957
- Chlorodynerus xanthus (Cameron, 1907)
- Chlorodynerus ypsilon (Kostylev, 1929)
