= Reschen =

Reschen Reschen am See / Resia
- Frazione
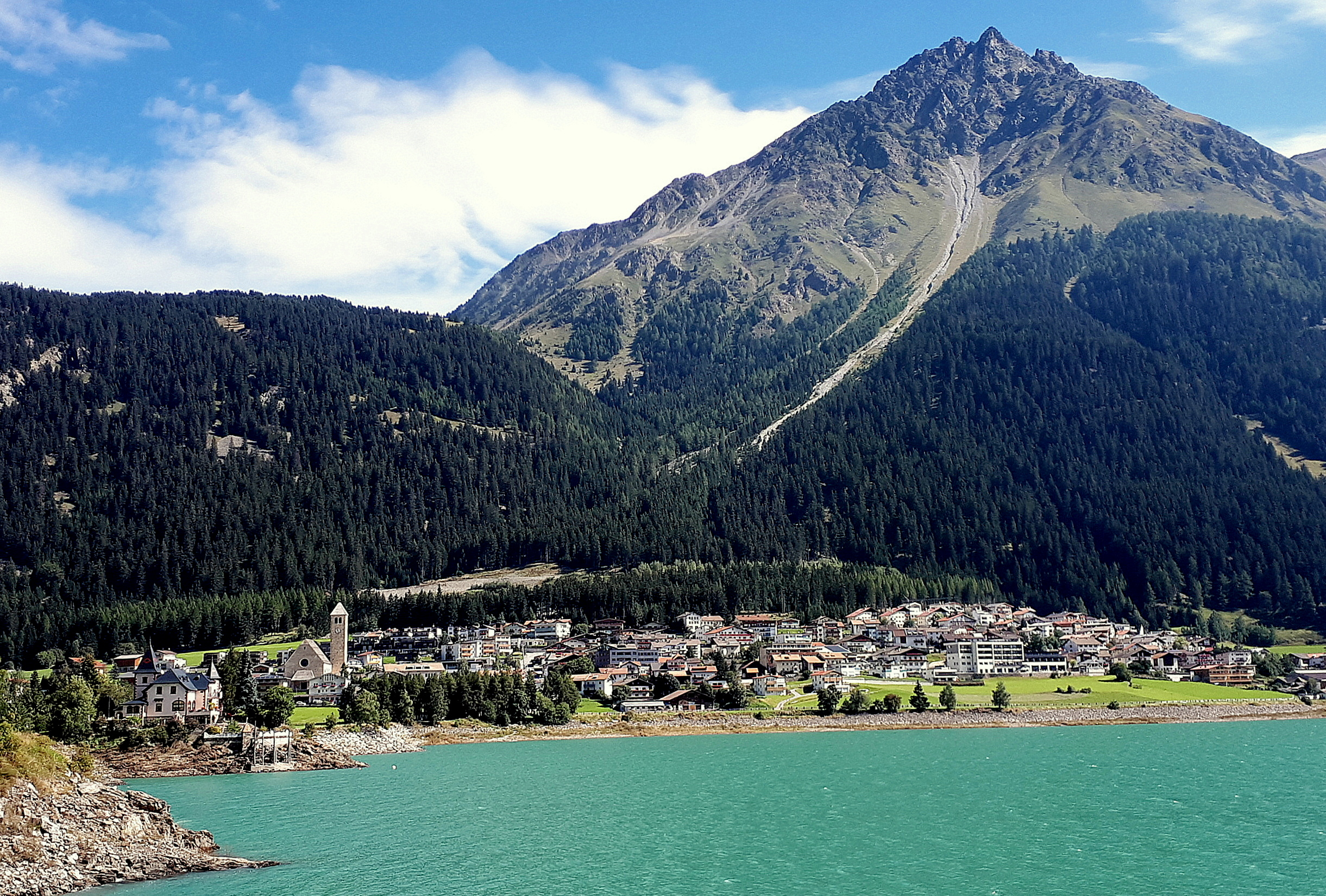
- View of Reschen and Klopaierspitze

- Location within Trentino-Alto Adige/Südtirol Location within Italy Location within Europe
- Country: Italy
- Region: Trentino-Alto Adige/Südtirol
- Province: Bolzano (BZ)
- Elevation: 1,500 m (4,900 ft)

Population
  - Total: 900
- Postal code: 39027
- Dialing code: 0473

Reschen (German: Reschen am See, lit. 'Reschen on the Lake') (Italian: Resia) is a village in South Tyrol, and one of four fractions of the comune Graun im Vinschgau. It is located around an elevation of 1,500 m (4,900 ft) in Vinschgau and the Vinschger Oberland, the highest part of the Etschtal. The village is near the Austrian-Italian border. Directly north of the village is the summit of Reschen Pass, from which the Adige, Italy's second-longest river, originates. Directly south of the village is the Reschensee, where the Rojental valley branches off to the southwest.

== Economy ==
Tourism plays a large role in the village. Agriculture also is important to the local economy, almost exclusively cattle breeding and dairy farming. As a result, the landscape around the Reschensee and Rojental is characterized by lush meadows.

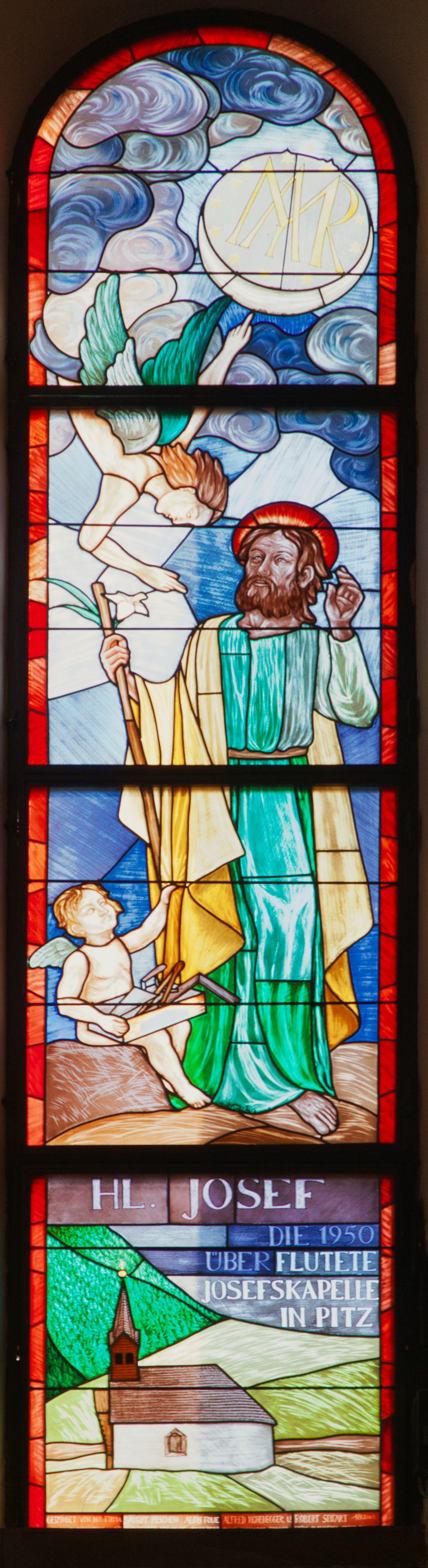
Stained glass in the parish church of St. Sebastian, recalling the flooding of the town

The Schöneben ski area, which is located in Reschen, is also of economic and touristic importance to the region.

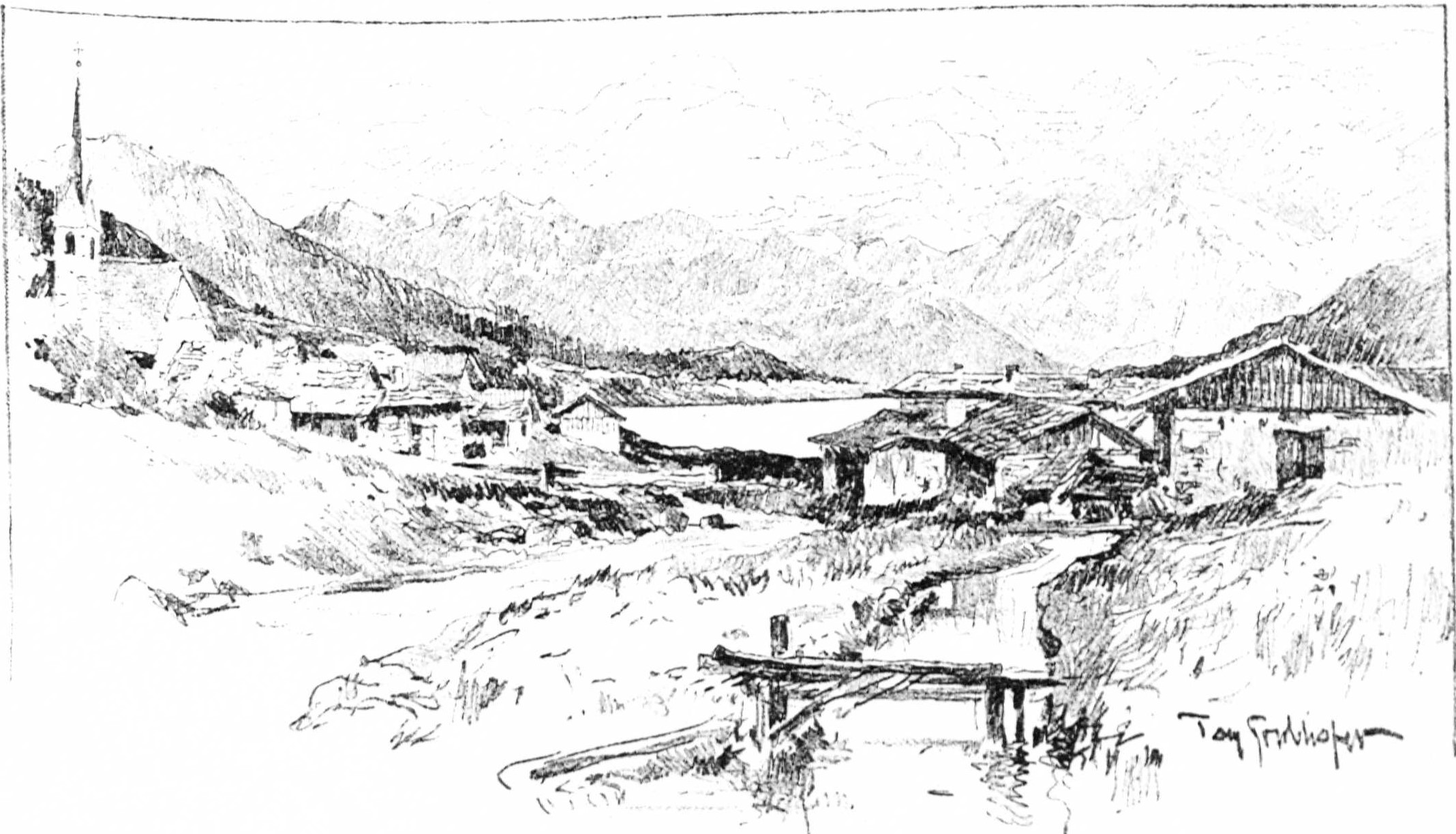
Tony Grubhofer: Reschen (1899)

According to linguist and topographer Karl Finsterwalder, the name dates back to 1393 and refers to a large farm named "der Resche". The name comes from a supposed nickname for the farm owner, with "resch" meaning strong or powerful.

== History ==
In the 19th century, the last bear in South Tyrol was shot in Reschen, until the bear JJ1 wandered through the province in 2005. Residents of Reschen are still referred to as "Bärenschießer" (bear shooters) to this day.

Following the defeat of Austria-Hungary in World War 1, South Tyrol was ceded to the Kingdom of Italy. When the Treaty of Saint-Germain went into effect in 1920, Reschen became a border town on the newly drawn Austrian-Italian border. In 1928, the previously independent municipality was incorporated into the new, larger municipality of Graun im Vinschgau.

Around Reschen are many bunkers of the Vallo Alpino, from the time of Italian fascism. Many of the underground facilities, such as the one on Plamort above Reschen, are extremely large. The area around the bunkers was formerly a restricted military zone. Nowadays, one can find various artificial boulders and cliffs around the village, that can be opened to reveal massive firing ports.

A significant part of the village was lost during the construction of the Reschensee in 1950. This necessitated the reconstruction of several buildings, such the parish church of St. Sebastieean, on higher ground.

== Education and transport ==
In Reschen, there is a primary school for German speakers. The village is crossed by SS 40 and the Vinschgau–Bozen Bike Route 2. It is also served by 6 different bus lines, all operated by Südtirolmobil.

== Recreation ==
Every summer, the Reschensee run used to take place in the village. With up to 4000 participating runners, the event was one of the biggest running events in South Tyrol. The 15.3 km (9.5 mi) course crossed forests and meadows and circumnavigated the Reschensee, where the church tower of Alt-Graun stands. The tradition was eventually ended following the 2025 race, after 25 years.

In the winter, sports such as skiing, snowboarding, and tobogganing are extremely common. The Schöneben ski area is a hotspot for winter tourism. At the local Reschen sport club (SC Reschen), talented skies receive professional training to become squad skiers. The sport club also offers free ski courses for local children taught by volunteers, and organizes local sporting events and races.

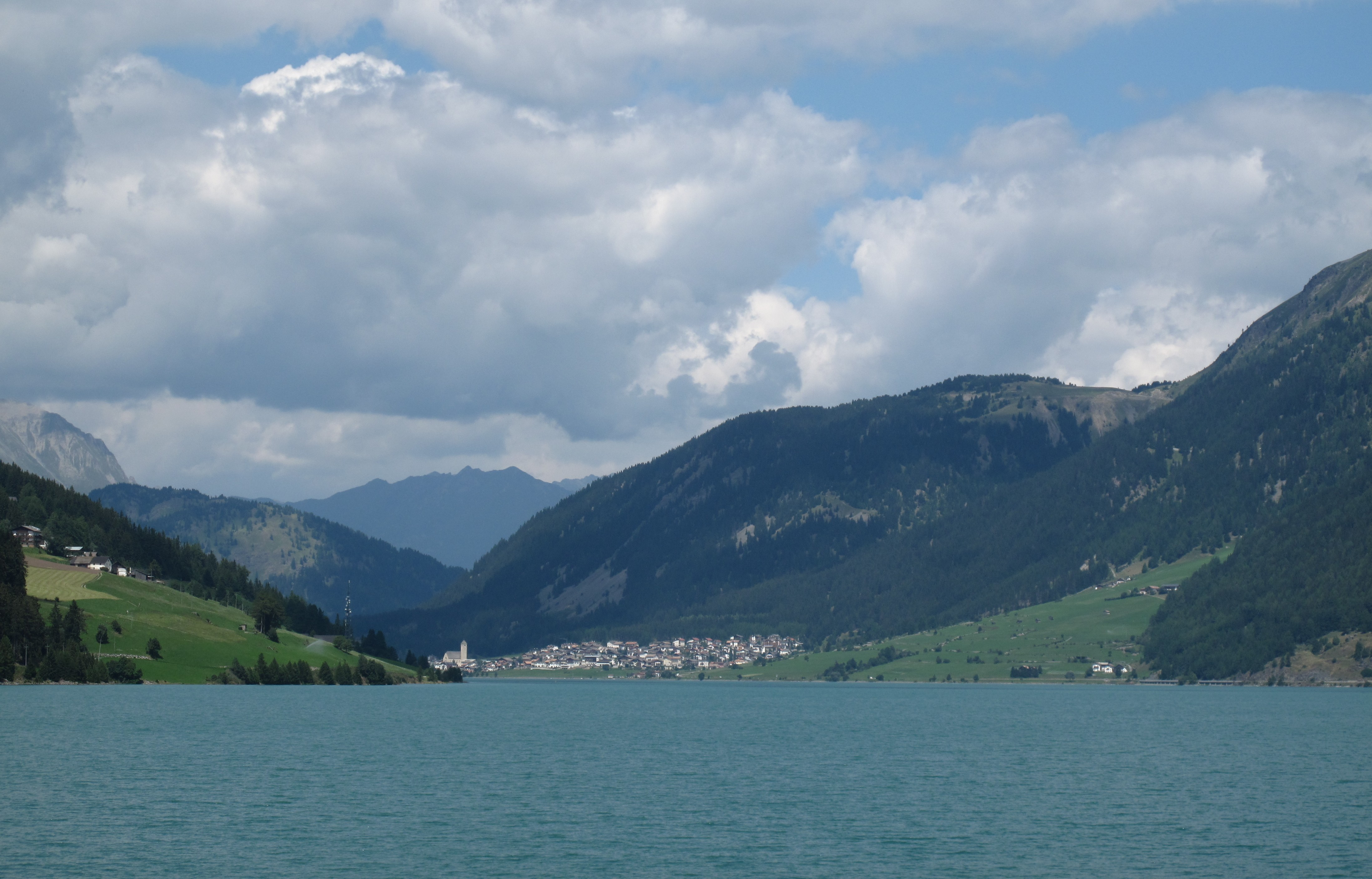
Reschen, with Reschensee in the foreground

Since 2008, the International German Snowkiting Championships (Internationalen Deutschen Snowkitemeisterschaften) have taken place on the frozen Reschensee. The lake was chosen as a regular venue for the event due to its snow and wind reliability, particularly in comparison to places in Germany. The location is also chosen, as its location near the Switzerland-Austria-Italy tripoint is easily accessible for people from other alpine lands. Due to the event being an open championship, athletes from Austria, Switzerland, Italy, Scandinavia and Eastern Europe participate alongside German athletes. In 2008, the competitions were held at the famous church tower in Alt-Graun, but were moved to Reschen after the first year.

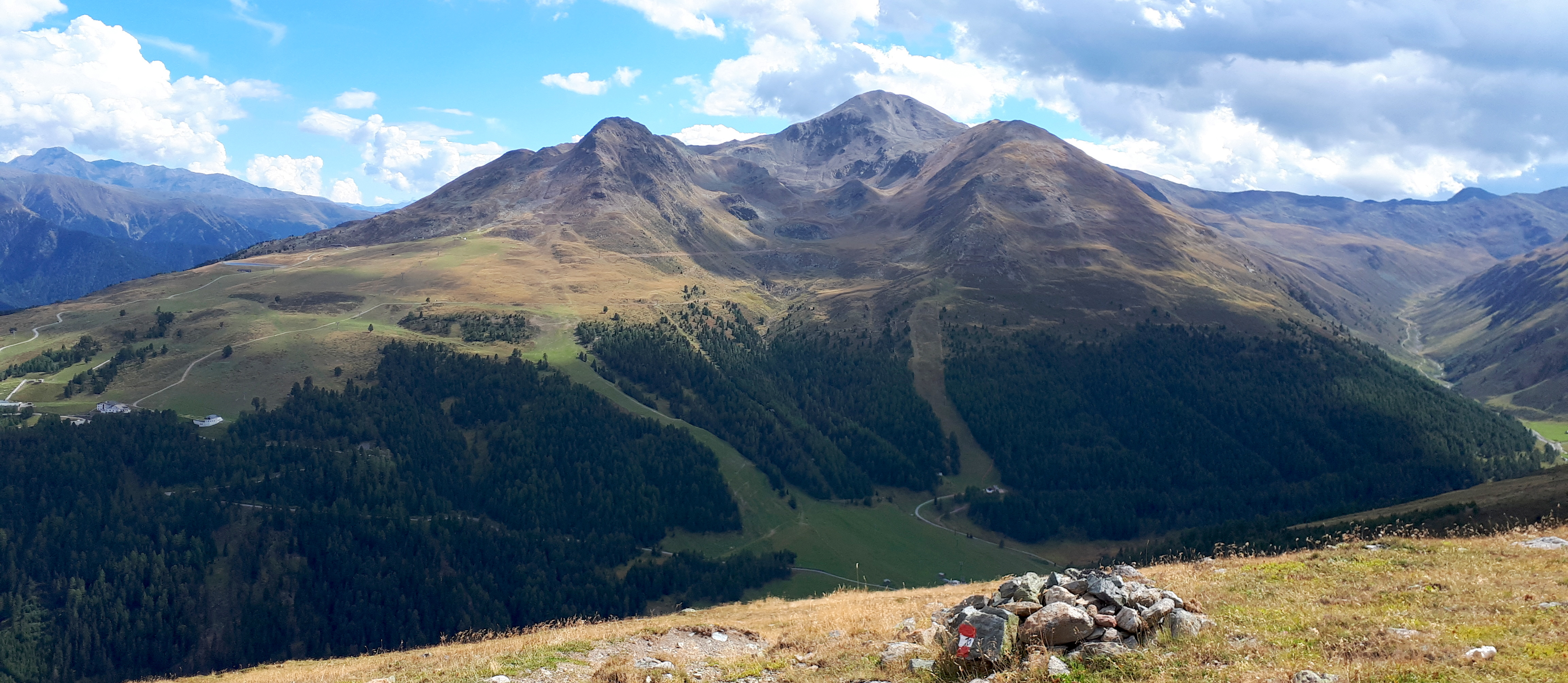
Zehner-, Elfer-, and Zwölferkopf

Hikes are also a common summer recreational activity in the area. There are many challenging routes, such as the hikes up Weißkugel and Klopaierspitze, but there are also easier routes such as the Zehnerkopf tour, from the Schöneben mountain station along a ridge in the direction of Elferspitze (the highest mountain around Reschen) and then back down to Zwölferkopf. These there mountains get their name because from the Hamlet of Rojen, the sun can be seen above each mountain at 10, 11, and 12, respectively.

Piz Lad is also known for its panorama view of the valley below, for which one stats at Reschner Alm. The peak has sweeping views of Engadine, Upper Vinschgau, and the surrounding mountains. Hiking is also possible below the summit, such as from Reschen to Rojental via the Vallierteck Chapel.

== Neighboring towns and fractions ==
- Nauders (A), Martina (CH), Graun, Langtaufers, St. Valentin auf der Haide

== Notable places ==
- Parish church of St. Sebastian with church furnishings from the previous church
- St. Martin's Chapel at Giernhof with artistically and historically significant funishings
- Valiertegg Pilgrimage Chapel with an elevation gain of over 200 m (660 ft) over 1 km (0.62 mi)
- Source of the Adige River
- Bunker complexes in the area of the Adige River source
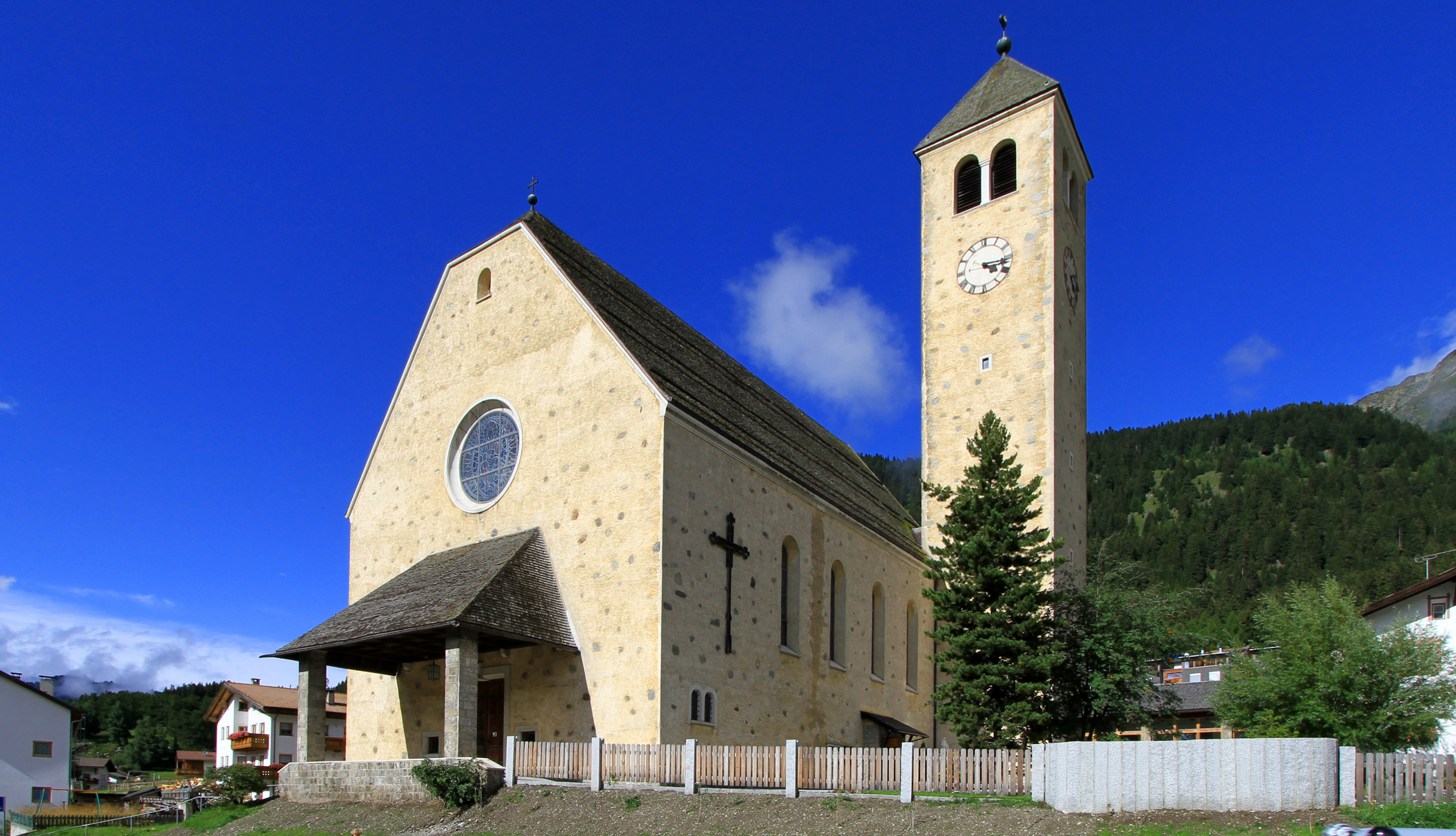
St. Sebastian

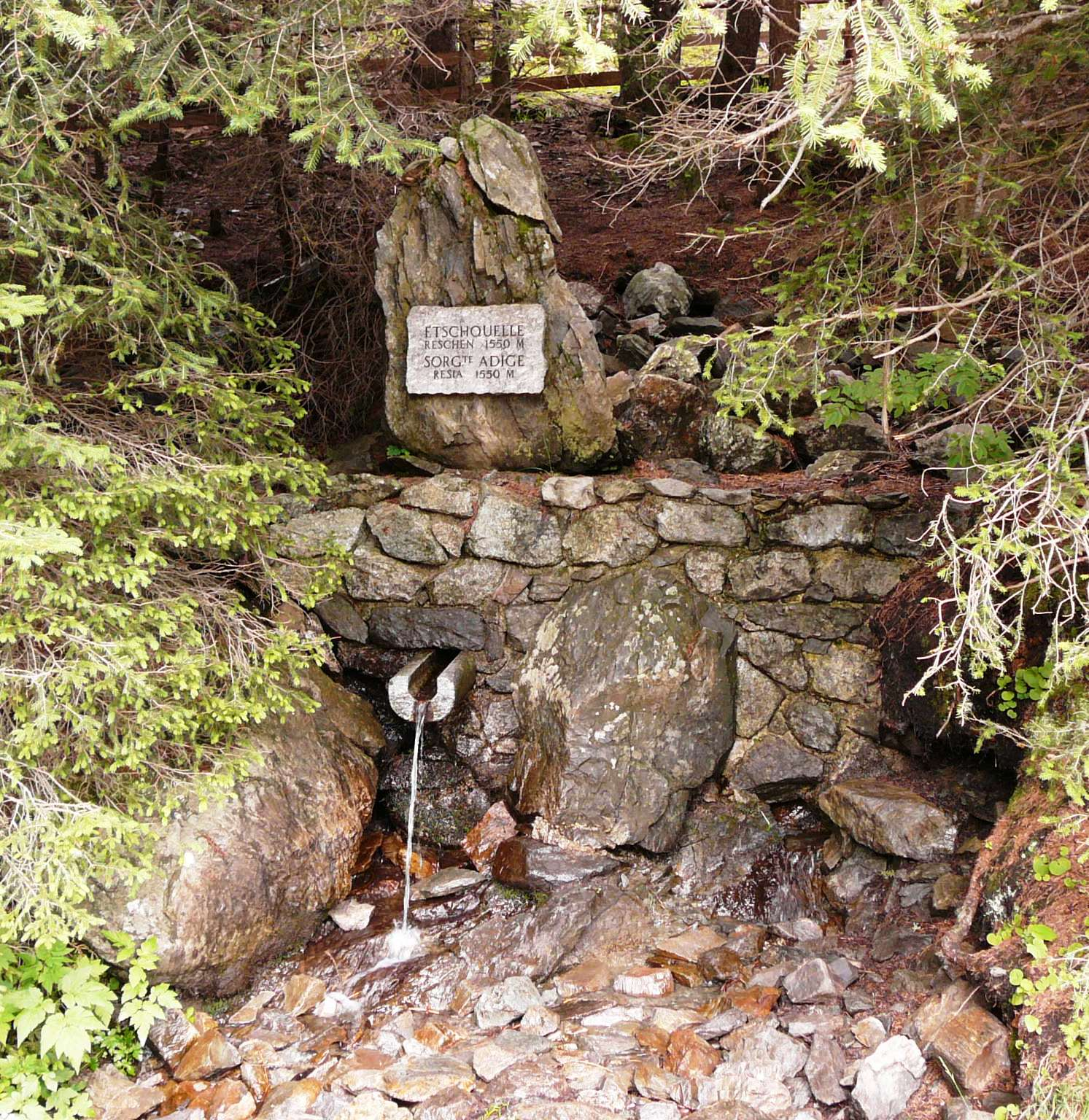
Source of the Adige

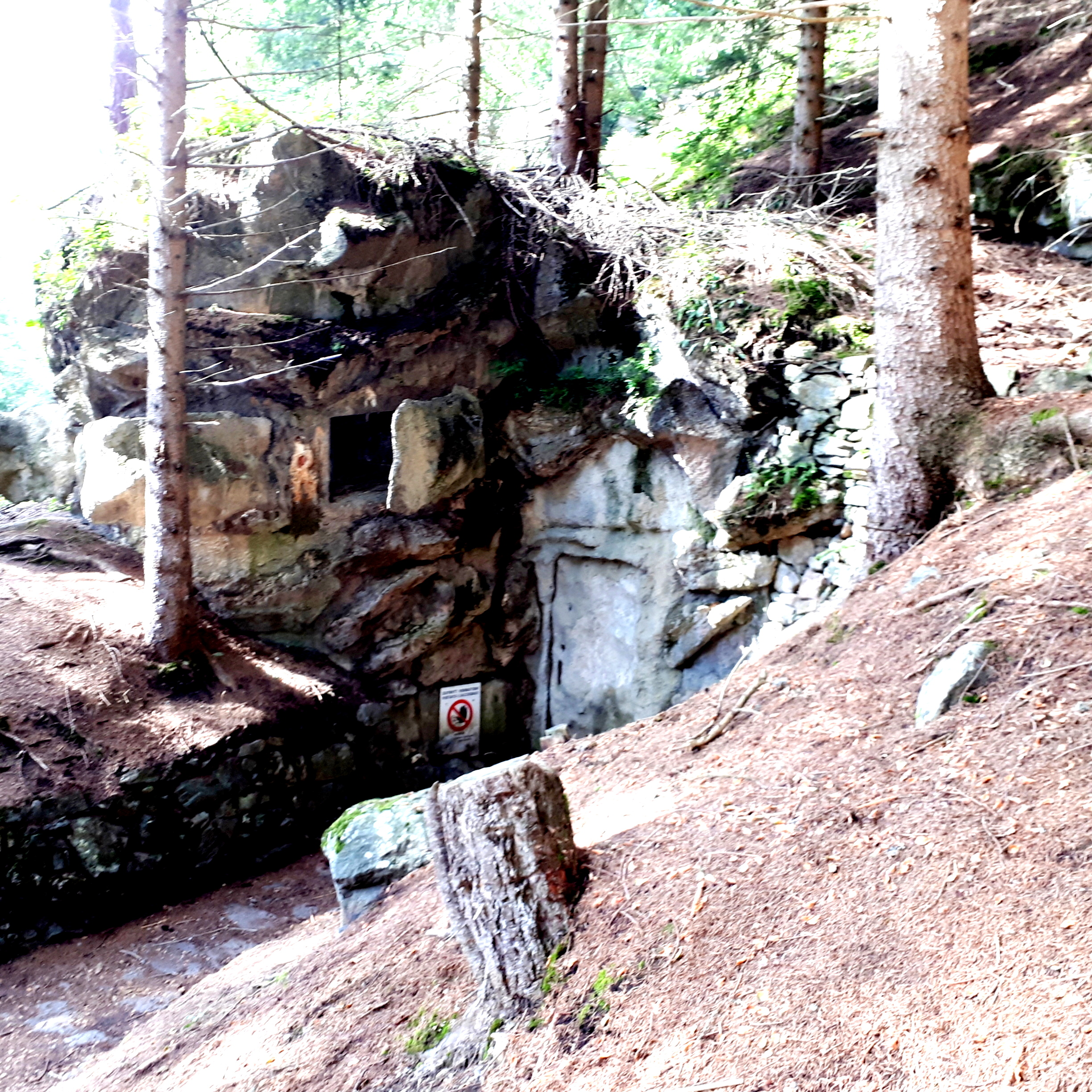
Bunkers at the Adige source

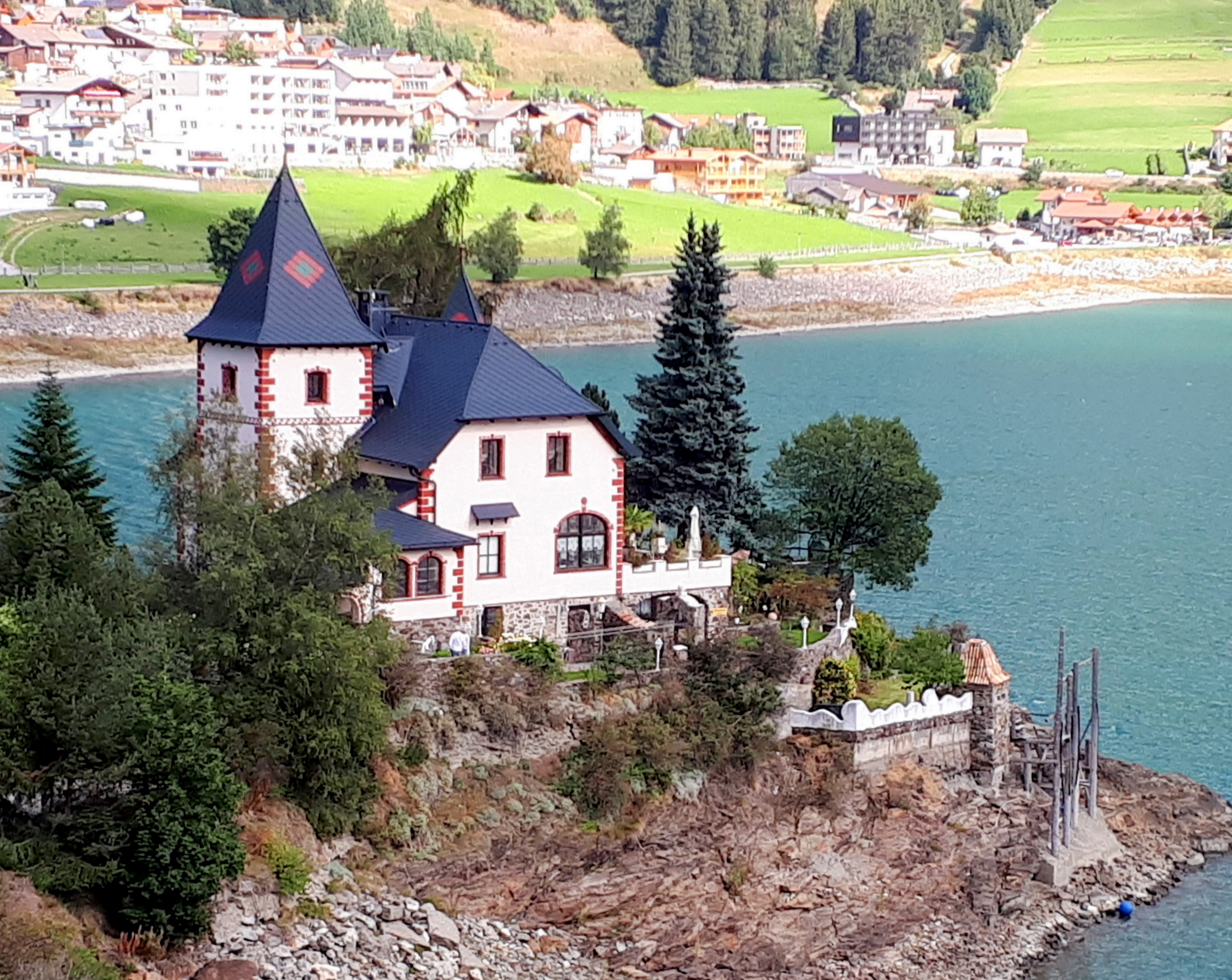
Schlössl am See
