= Mals Heath =

Coordinates: 46°43′10″N 10°32′39″E

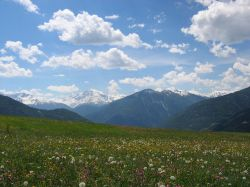
Mals Heath

The Mals Heath (German: Malser Haide) is located in South Tyrol, Italy; it is one of the largest ancient landslides and one of the most remarkable landscape features in the Alps. It is located in the Upper Vinschgau where a broad pass (the Reschen Pass) crosses the main Alpine divide into the Inn Valley (Austria). It extends from Glurns via Laatsch, Schleis, and Burgeis up to Plawenn. On the southern part is the village of Mals. The height difference of the heath varies from 900 m (Glurns) to 1,760 m (Plawenner Alm). The landslide emerges from the small side valley of Plawenntal, and descends for 11 km to the head of Vinschgau proper. The volume of the debris fan is estimated at 1,650 million cubic metres. It had always been assumed to be an alluvial fan, built up by numerous floods and debris small flows. Later research has demonstrated that a lost mountain could have existed above the head of Plawenntal, with a summit at about 3,100m - the present highest peak on the perimeter being the Mittereck, 2,908 m. There are indications all around the perimeter of a catastrophic collapse, severing former ridges and valley heads (notably Vivanatal). The shape of the lost mountain can readily be reconstructed by projecting these truncated landforms until they meet up. The volume of the lost mountain (named Plawennspitz) is very close to that of Mals Heath. There is at present no evidence of when this event occurred, but probably soon after the last glacier melted, over 10,000 years in the past. Similar events probably created large fans nearby at St. Valentin, and in the main Vinschgau, notably at Allitz-Laas (Gadriamure) where the lost mountain and vast debris cone are even larger. Other megafans in the Alps are likely to be catastrophic too (1). The Mals Heath used to be a barren heath since it was so free draining. The debris fan dams a lake, Haidersee, which is now used as a source of irrigation water through a system of channels, and nearly all the heath is now cultivated and prosperous. The fan also displaces the main river, Adige, and the large tributary, Puni, to opposite sides of the valley. Disastrous floods still occur, destroying houses and even villages. The main road climbs the fan in broad zigzags, not the usual hairpins of an alpine pass, with several large wind turbines taking advantage of the smooth terrain and natural wind funnel.
