= St. Valentin auf der Haide =

Coordinates: 46°45′49.95″N 10°32′07.90″E

- Village
- San Valentino alla Muta
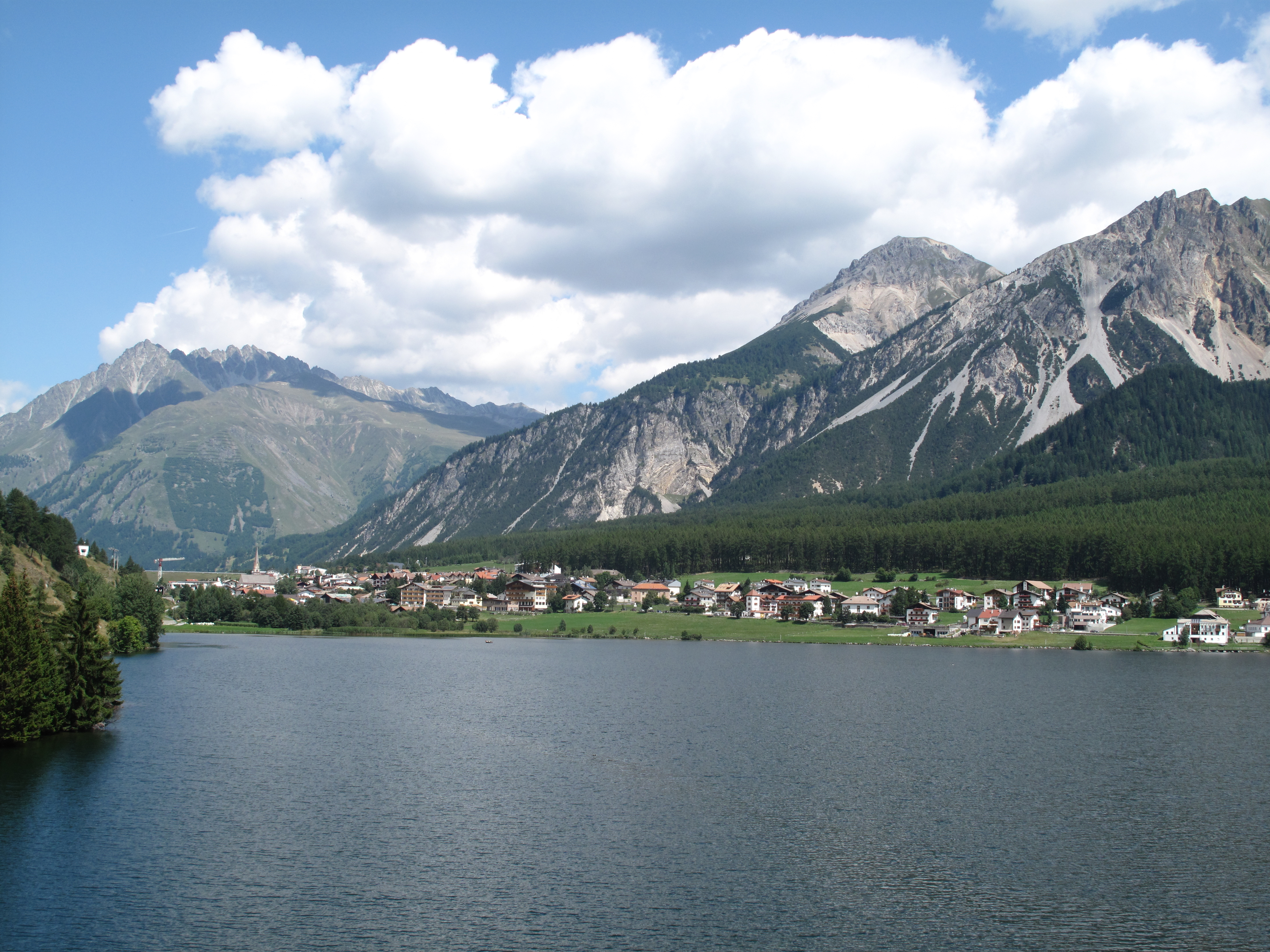
- St. Valentin, looking at the village

- Location within Trentino-Alto Adige/Südtirol Location within Italy Location within Europe
- Country: Italy
- Region: Trentino-Alto Adige/Südtirol
- Province: Bolzano (BZ)

Area
  - Total: 26.42 km^{2} (10.20 sq mi)
- Elevation: 1,472 m (4,829 ft)

Population (2015)
  - Total: 891
  - Density: 33.7/km^{2} (87/sq mi)
- Demonym: Hoader (Haider)
- Postal code: 39027
- Dialing code: 0473
- Patron saint: Valentine of Passau

St. Valentin auf der Haide (Italian: San Valentino alla Muta) is a village in South Tyrol in the municipality of Graun im Vinschgau in Italy. The village close to the Reschen Pass lies at a height of 1,472 metres between the Haidersee and Reschensee on the scree slope of the Mals Heath. St. Valentin auf der Haide has about 800 inhabitants who predominantly earn a living from summer and winter tourism.

St. Valentin also has a ski resort, Haideralm, which is part of the Skiparadies Reschenpass. St. Valentin also has a ski resort, Haideralm, which is part of the Skiparadies Reschenpass. Since 1965, the Set. Valentin Volunteer Fire Department (Freiwillige Feuerwehr St. Valentin a.d.H.) has had a close relationship with that of Überlingen in Baden-Württemberg, Germany. The departments officially entered a partnership in 1982.

== Geography ==
=== Hamlets ===
- Dörfl (Monteplair)
- Kaschon
- Padöll, Plagött
- Fischerhäuser
- Stockerhöfe
- Greinhof
- Thönihof

=== Neighboring Districts ===
- Graun
- Langtaufers
- Reschen
- Burgeis
- Plawenn

=== Mountain Peaks ===
- Elferspitze 2926 m
- Seebodenspitze 2857 m
- Großhorn 2630 m
- Pleisköpfl
- Habicherkopf 2901 m

== Climate ==
The village has a humid continental climate, classified as Dfb in Köppen climate classification.

Climate data for San Valentino alla Muta, elevation 1,459 m (4,787 ft) (1991–2020)
Month	Jan	Feb	Mar	Apr	May	Jun	Jul	Aug	Sep	Oct	Nov	Dec	Year
Record high °C (°F)	13.4 (56.1)	16.4 (61.5)	19.2 (66.6)	23.4 (74.1)	25.6 (78.1)	31.2 (88.2)	30.6 (87.1)	33.0 (91.4)	26.0 (78.8)	23.2 (73.8)	19.6 (67.3)	14.2 (57.6)	33.0 (91.4)
Mean daily maximum °C (°F)	1.6 (34.9)	3.0 (37.4)	7.0 (44.6)	10.4 (50.7)	14.3 (57.7)	18.6 (65.5)	20.4 (68.7)	20.3 (68.5)	16.0 (60.8)	11.5 (52.7)	6.0 (42.8)	2.2 (36.0)	10.9 (51.7)
Daily mean °C (°F)	−3.4 (25.9)	−2.5 (27.5)	1.4 (34.5)	5.1 (41.2)	9.4 (48.9)	13.2 (55.8)	15.0 (59.0)	14.7 (58.5)	10.9 (51.6)	6.7 (44.1)	1.7 (35.1)	−2.1 (28.2)	5.8 (42.5)
Mean daily minimum °C (°F)	−6.9 (19.6)	−6.4 (20.5)	−2.7 (27.1)	0.8 (33.4)	5.0 (41.0)	8.5 (47.3)	10.2 (50.4)	10.4 (50.7)	7.0 (44.6)	3.3 (37.9)	−1.1 (30.0)	−4.9 (23.2)	1.9 (35.5)
Record low °C (°F)	−20.0 (−4.0)	−20.4 (−4.7)	−22.6 (−8.7)	−14.0 (6.8)	−8.0 (17.6)	−1.0 (30.2)	1.0 (33.8)	3.0 (37.4)	−5.4 (22.3)	−9.8 (14.4)	−13.0 (8.6)	−19.2 (−2.6)	−22.6 (−8.7)
Average precipitation mm (inches)	19.6 (0.77)	14.5 (0.57)	18.6 (0.73)	20.2 (0.80)	32.4 (1.28)	54.2 (2.13)	72.4 (2.85)	73.7 (2.90)	49.8 (1.96)	44.8 (1.76)	33.8 (1.33)	22.2 (0.87)	456.2 (17.95)
Average precipitation days (≥ 1.0 mm)	4.4	4.0	4.3	4.6	7.1	8.1	9.5	10.3	6.9	6.1	5.8	4.6	75.7
Average relative humidity (%)	67.4	64.3	62.6	64.1	66.9	66.4	66.5	68.9	69.9	71.6	72.1	69.2	67.5
Average dew point °C (°F)	−8.0 (17.6)	−7.9 (17.8)	−4.9 (23.2)	−1.9 (28.6)	3.0 (37.4)	6.6 (43.9)	8.6 (47.5)	9.2 (48.6)	6.0 (42.8)	2.3 (36.1)	−2.5 (27.5)	−6.7 (19.9)	0.3 (32.6)
Source: NOAA
