= Franz Friedrich Kohl =

Austrian entomologist and folksong researcher

- Born: 13 January 1851; St. Valentin auf der Haide, Austrian Empire
- Died: 15 December 1924 (aged 73); Traismauer, Austria
- Known for: Specialising in Hymenoptera; monograph Die Crabronen der paläarktischen Region monographisch bearbeitet
- Scientific career
- Fields: Entomology, Folksong research
- Institutions: Naturhistorisches Museum, Vienna
- Author abbrev. (zoology): Kohl

Franz Friedrich Kohl (13 January 1851, in St. Valentin auf der Haide – 15 December 1924, in Traismauer) was an Austrian entomologist and folksong researcher.

Kohl was initially a middle school professor in Bolzano and then Innsbruck. He next worked in the Entomology Department, Naturhistorisches Museum, Vienna. He specialised in Hymenoptera, especially Sphecidae. He is best known for his monograph Die Crabronen der paläarktischen Region monographisch bearbeitet. Ann. Hofmus. Wien. 29: 1-453 (1915).
