= Burgeis =

Human settlement in Mals, South Tyrol, Trentino-South Tyrol, Italy

Coordinates: 46°42′38″N 10°31′44″E

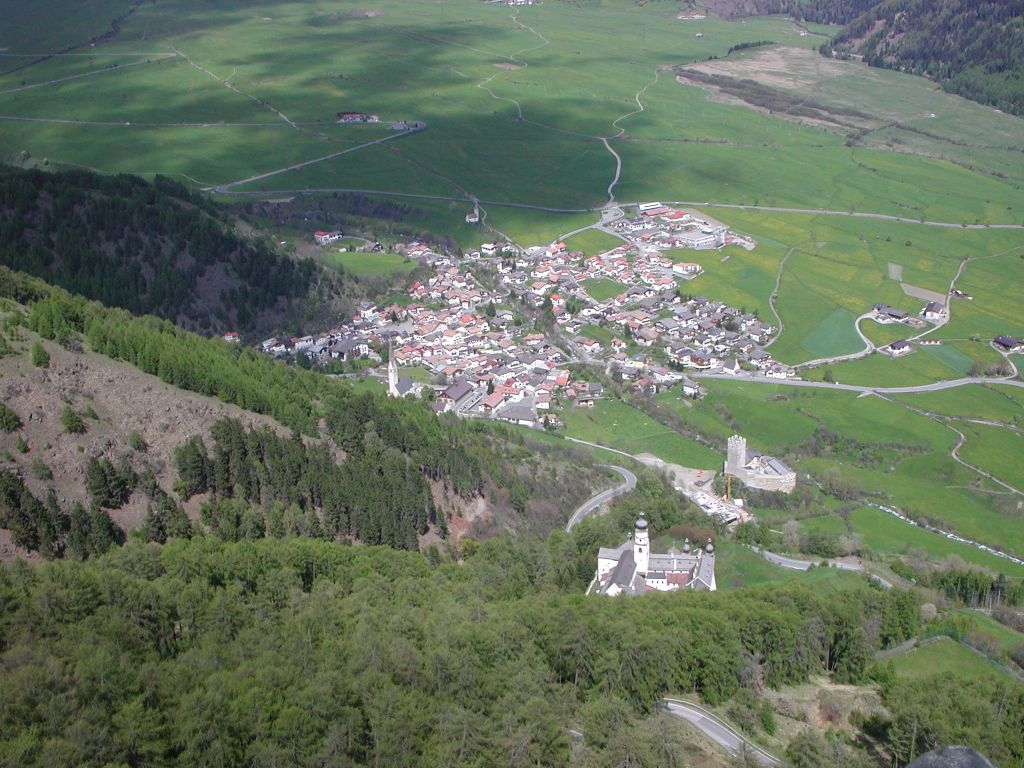
Burgeis and the Marienberg Abbey

Burgeis (Italian: Burgusio, Romansh: Barbusch) is the largest frazione of the comune of Mals, Italy, and sits at an altitude of 1216m in Vinschgau in South Tyrol beneath the mountain Watles (2557) on the upper reaches of the Adige. The name goes all the way back to a Roman founding, as a fort on the "Via Claudia Augusta", which runs through the village. This fort later gave the name of the Edelfreien von Burgus-Wanga, whose arms the village bears today.

Burgeis has 828 inhabitants (March 2007) . It lies 2.5 Kilometer from Mals.

== International relations ==
=== Twin towns – Sister cities ===
Burgeis is twinned with:

- Lohr am Main, Germany
- Beilngries, Bayern, Germany
- Weingarten, Germany

== History ==
The oldest account mentioning Burgeis is the Chronicle of the Benedictine Father, Goswin, who lived between 1320 and 1395 or so. This gives a wide reaching sketch of the place, of the history of Marienberg and of Obervischgau in the high Middle Ages. So we know more about Burgeis in the 12th century than many other, more important places.

=== Marienberg Abbey ===
Above Burgeis lies Europe's highest Benedictine abbey Marienberg (at 1340 m). Its impressive Baroque church and the Romanesque crypt (1160) belong to the most beautiful ?school of art? in Vinschgau. The Frescos in the crypt date from between 1175 and 1180. They were partly discovered in 1887 and in 1980 completely freed. Burgeis is the birthplace of the famous Baroque painter Johann Evangelist Holzer.

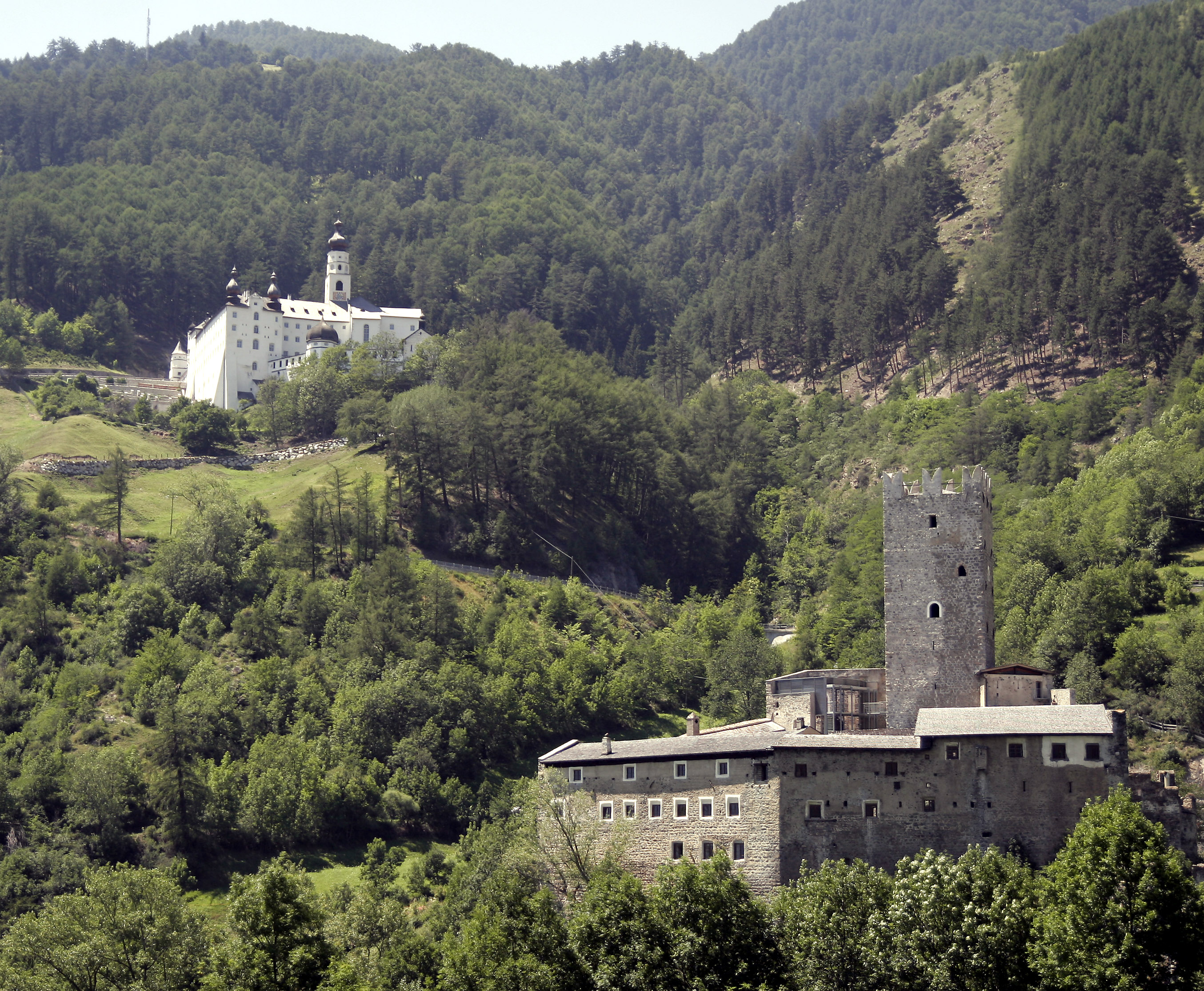
Marienberg Abbey and Fürstenburg

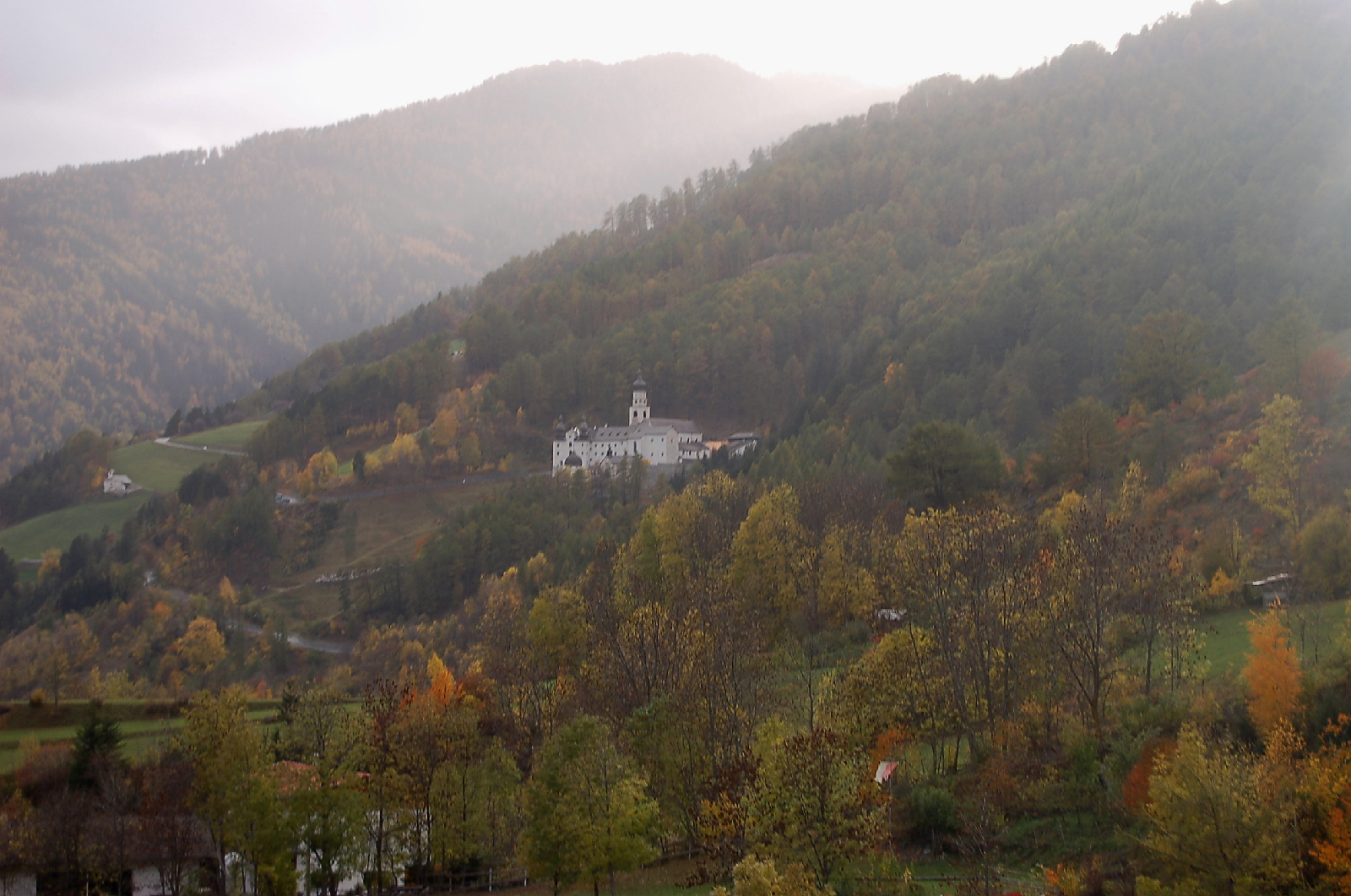
Marienberg Abbey in the fall

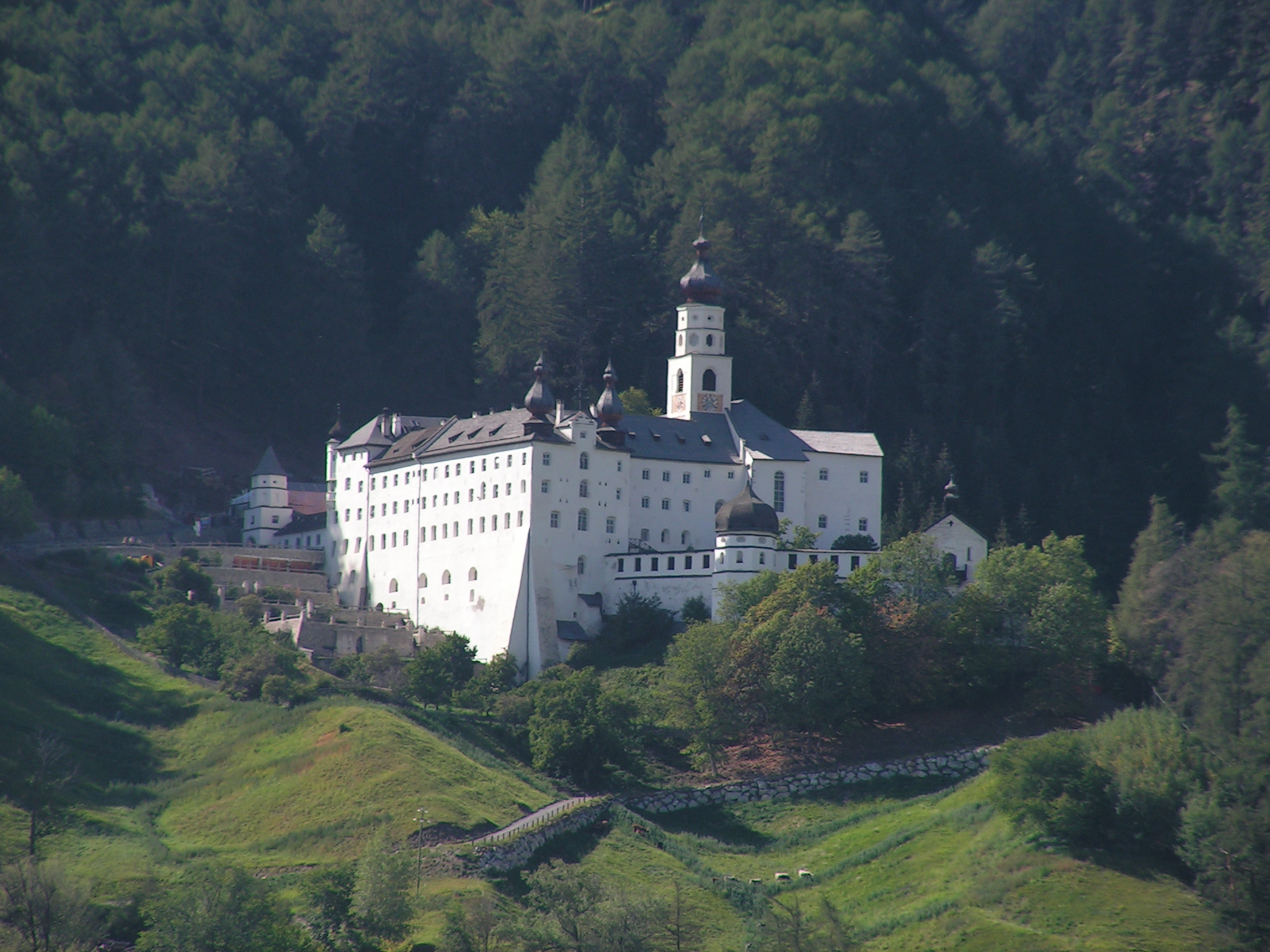
Marienberg Abbey

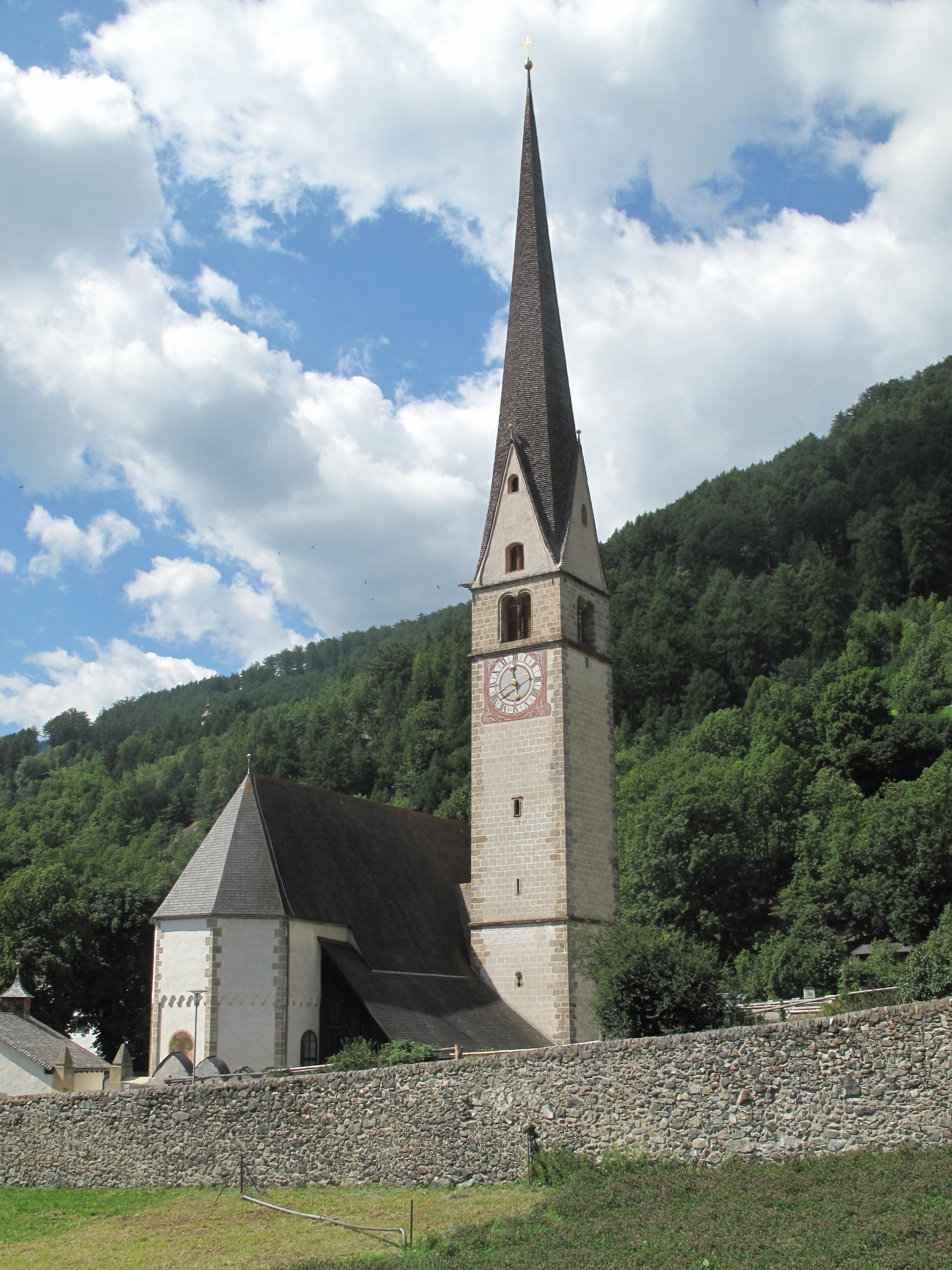
church: die Maria Empfängniskirche

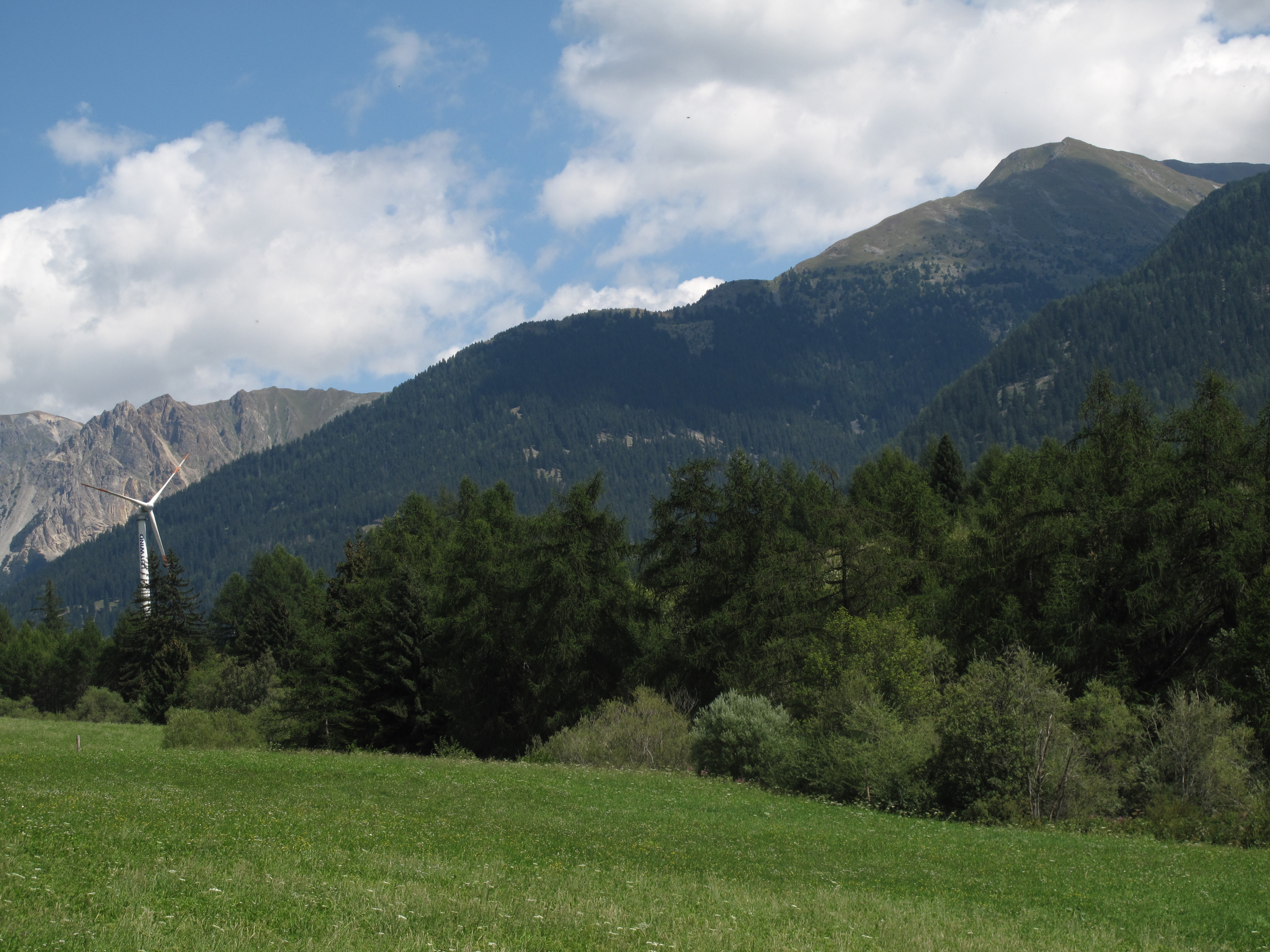
panorama between Burgeis and Sankt Valentin

=== St. Stefan ===
The close of the Abbey contains a small church St. Stefan, which dates back to the early days of Christianity in the 5th century, according to archaeological dig, although it got its current form in the 9th and 10th centuries.

== Economy ==
There are many Hotels, Pensions and Guesthouses (Gasthöfe) in and around Burgeis, which today form the basis of a flourishing tourism industry, especially in the winter.

== Neighboring Places ==
St. Valentin auf der Haide, Mals, Schlinig, Schleis, Planeil, Plawenn

== Literature ==
- Hubert Walder / Helmut Stampfer: Romanische Wandmalerei im Vinschgau, 2002, ISBN 88-8266-127-X
- Alfred Reichling: Orgellandschaft Südtirol, Bozen 1982, S. 11f., 60-63.
