= Laatsch =

Laatsch is a German language surname. It stems from the German word latschen for "to slouch along" and was probably used as a nickname for a person with a slouching gait or a limp. Notable people with the name include:

- Brandon Laatsch, American filmmaker, YouTuber, and game developer
- James F. Laatsch (born 1940), American politician from Wisconsin

== See also ==
- Lasch
