= Klopaierspitze =

Mountain in Italy

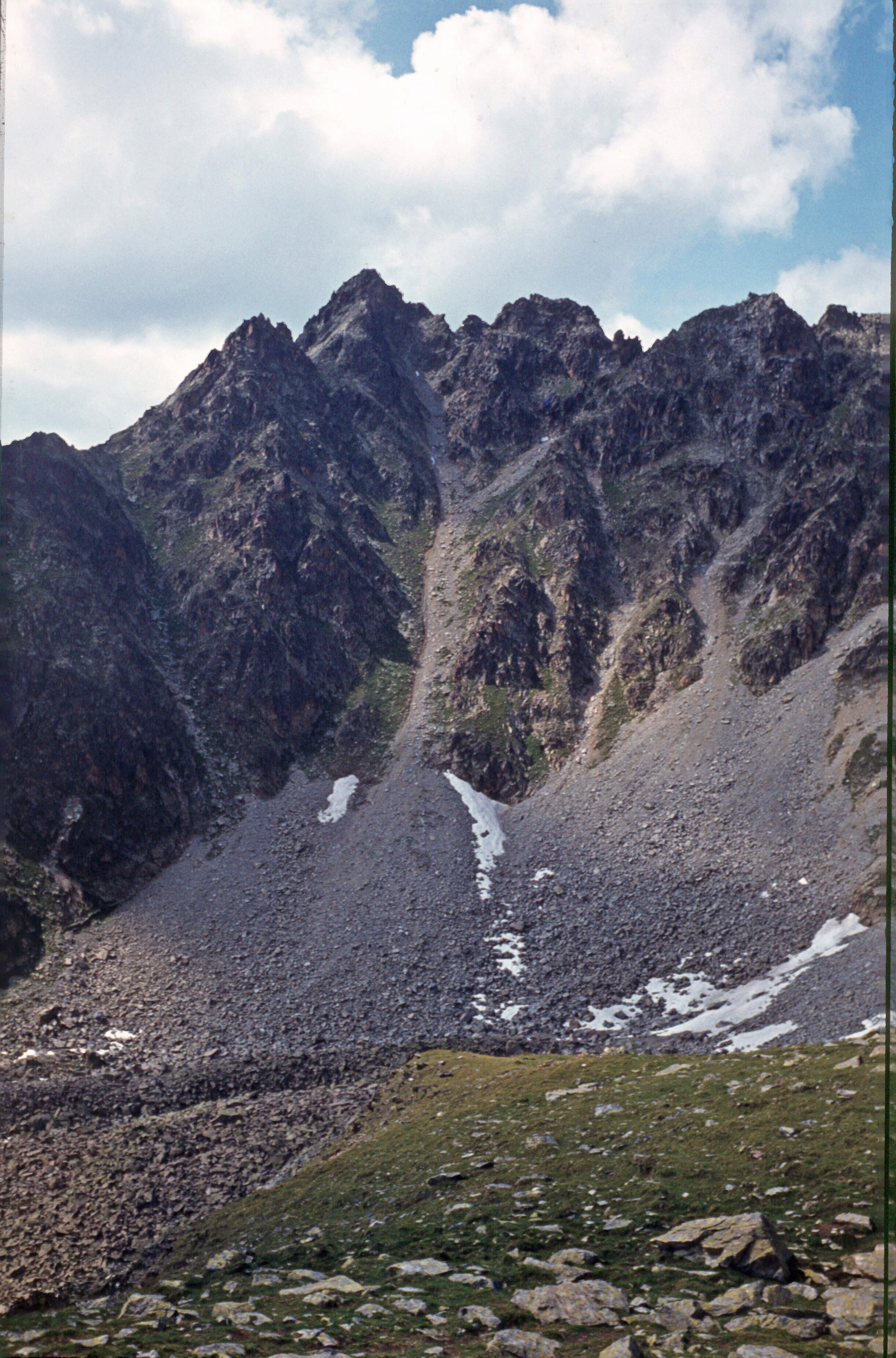

Highest point
- Elevation: 2,918 m (9,573 ft)
- Coordinates: 46°50′16″N 10°32′46″E

Geography
- Location: Tyrol, Austria / South Tyrol, Italy
- Parent range: Ötztal Alps

The Klopaierspitze (Italian: Piz Clopai; German: Klopaierspitze) is a peak in the Ötztal Alps on the border between Tyrol, Austria, and South Tyrol, Italy.
