= Haidersee =

Lake in South Tyrol, Italy

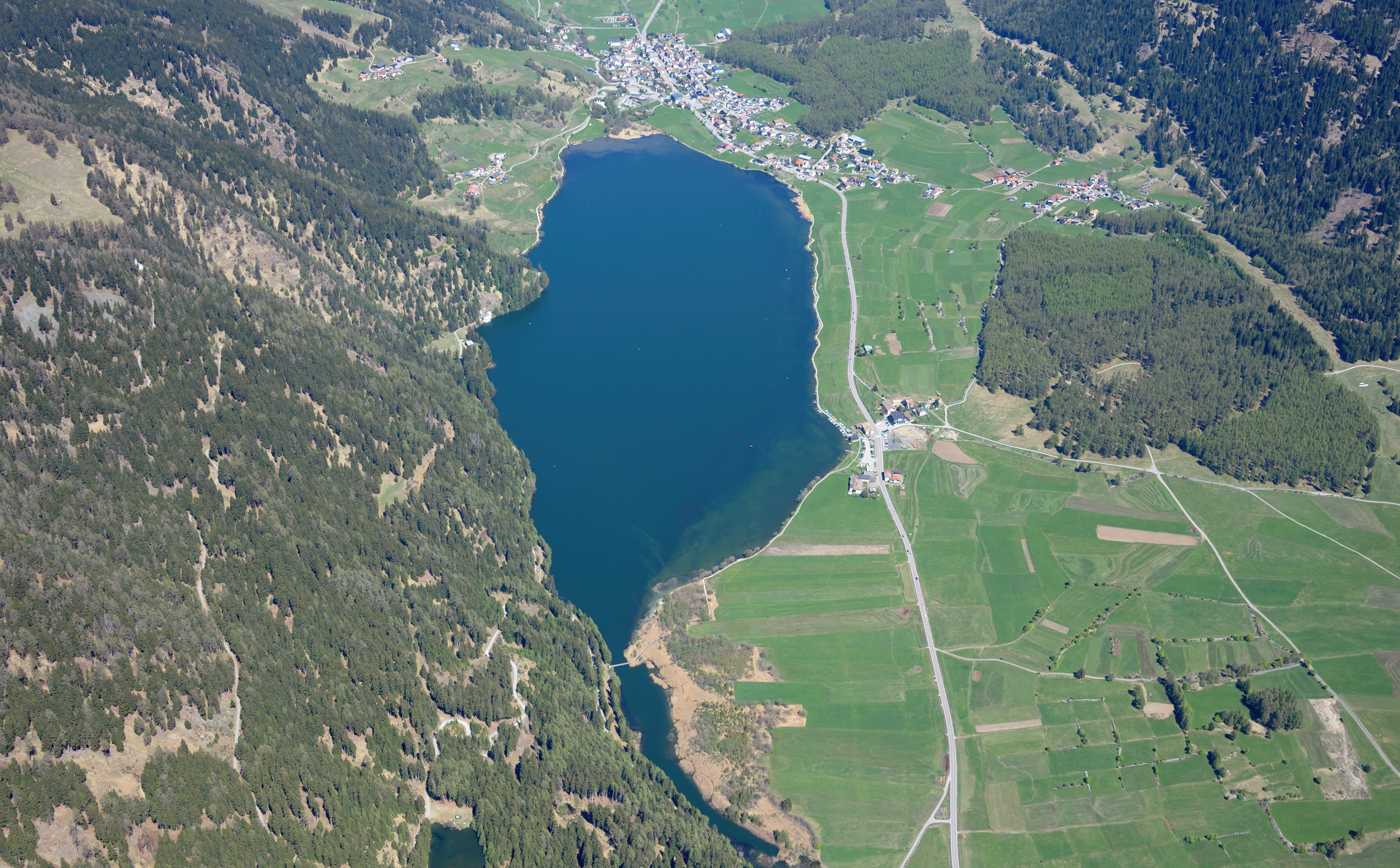

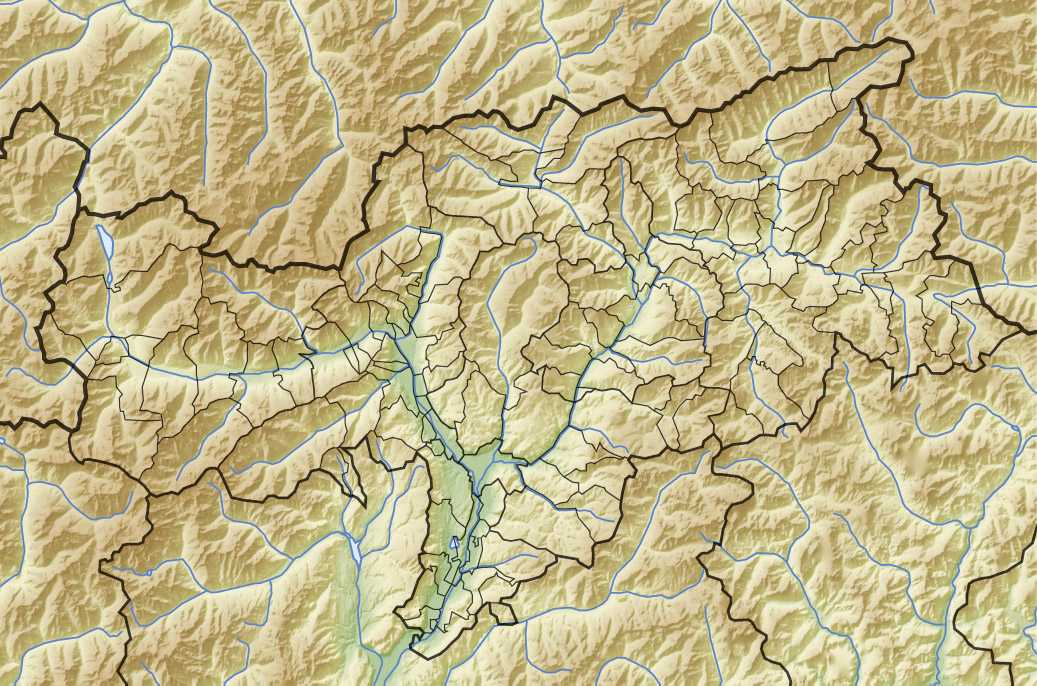
- Location within South Tyrol
- Location: South Tyrol
- Coordinates: 46°45′16″N 10°31′55″E
- Primary inflows: Adige, Zerzerbach
- Catchment area: 33.97 km^{2} (13.12 sq mi)
- Basin countries: Italy
- Surface area: 89 ha (220 acres)
- Average depth: 6.7 m (22 ft)
- Max. depth: 15 m (49 ft)
- Water volume: 6,000,000 m^{3} (0.0014 cu mi)
- Shore length^{1}: 4.5 km (3 mi)
- Surface elevation: 1,450 m (4,757 ft)
- Settlements: Graun im Vinschgau
- ^{1} Shore length is not a well-defined measure.

The Haidersee (Italian: Lago di San Valentino alla Muta) is a lake in South Tyrol, Italy, which belongs to the municipality of Graun im Vinschgau.
