= Trollstigen =

Mountain pass in Norway

Coordinates: 62°28′N 7°40′E

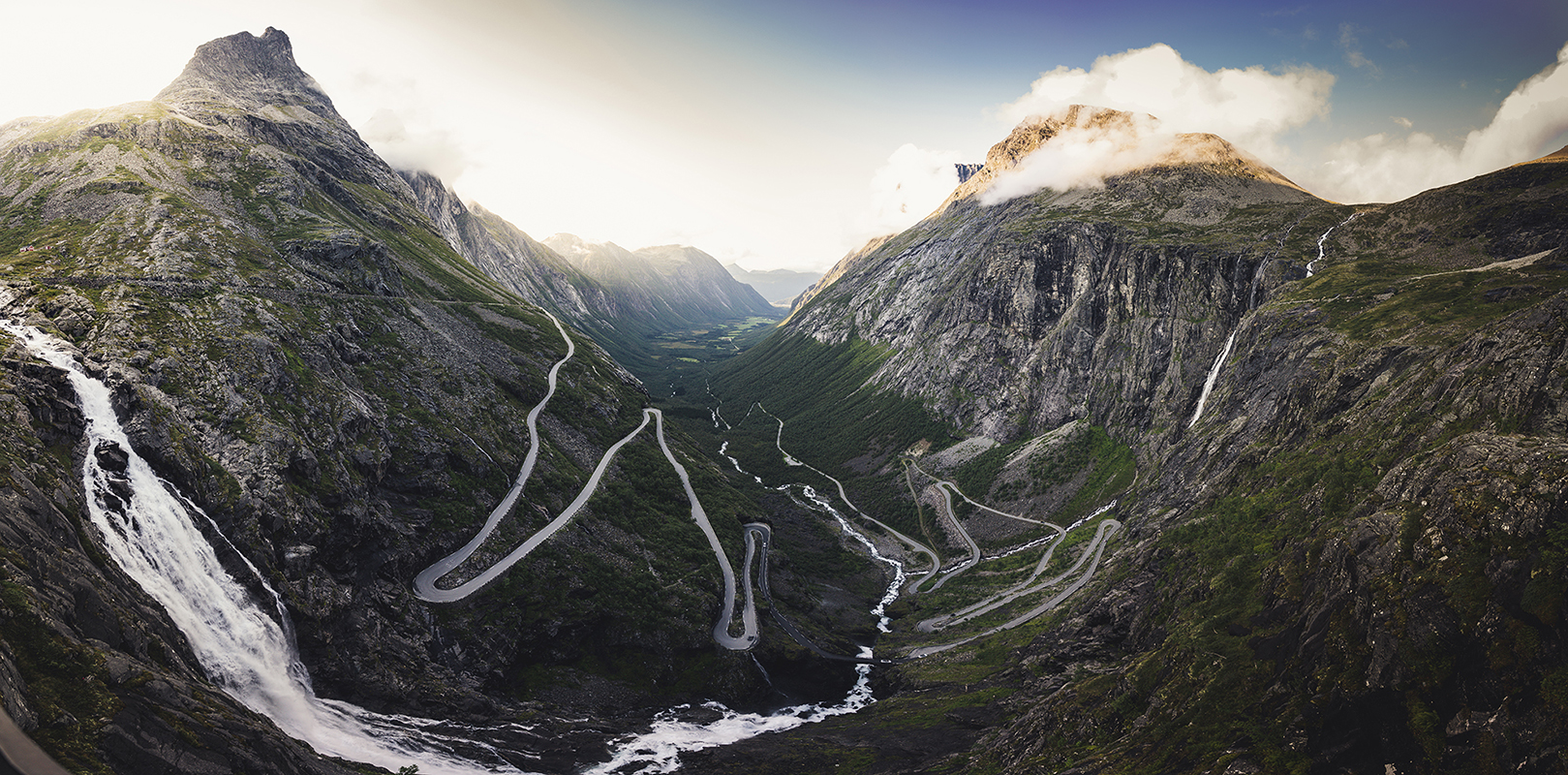
Trollstigen in 2021

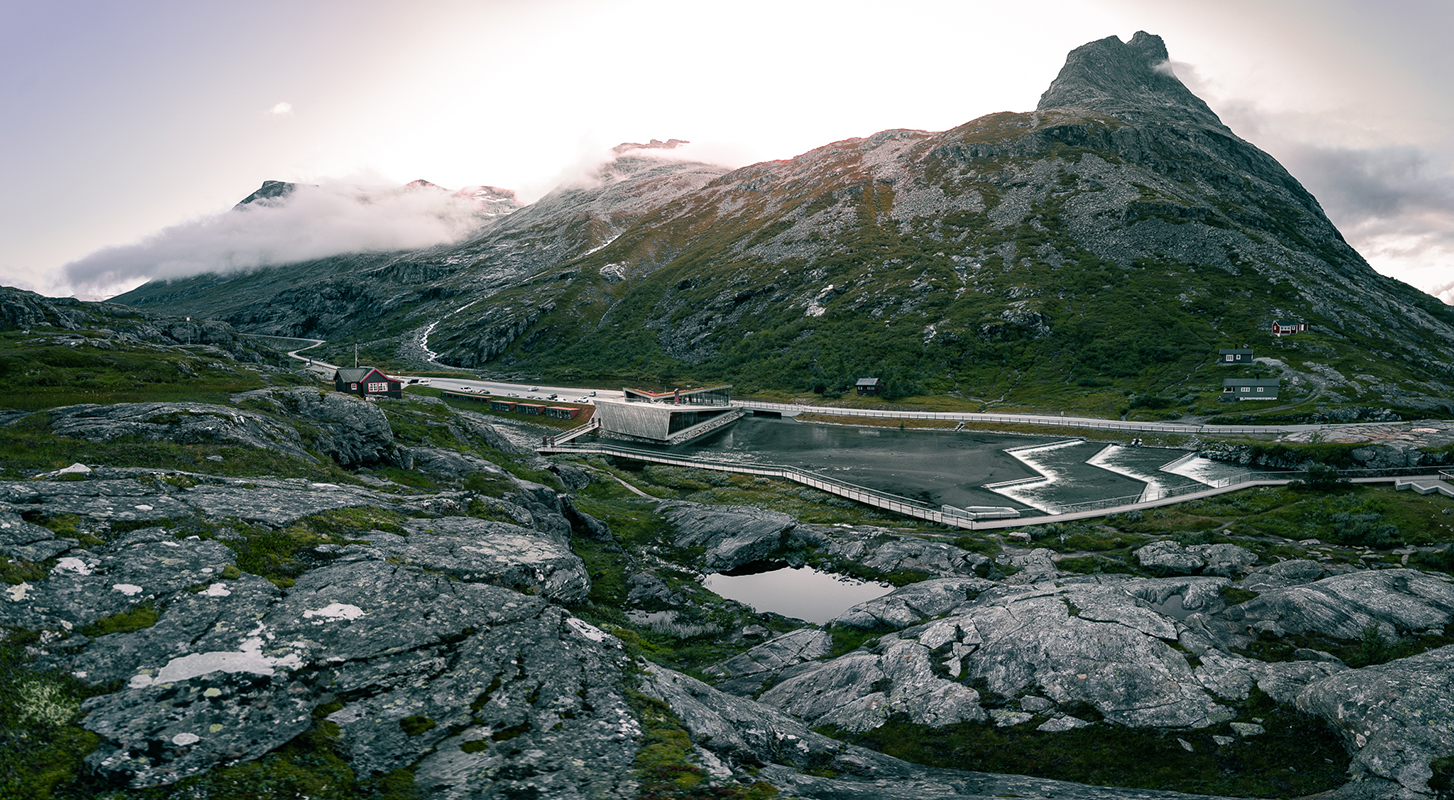
visitor center of Trollstigen

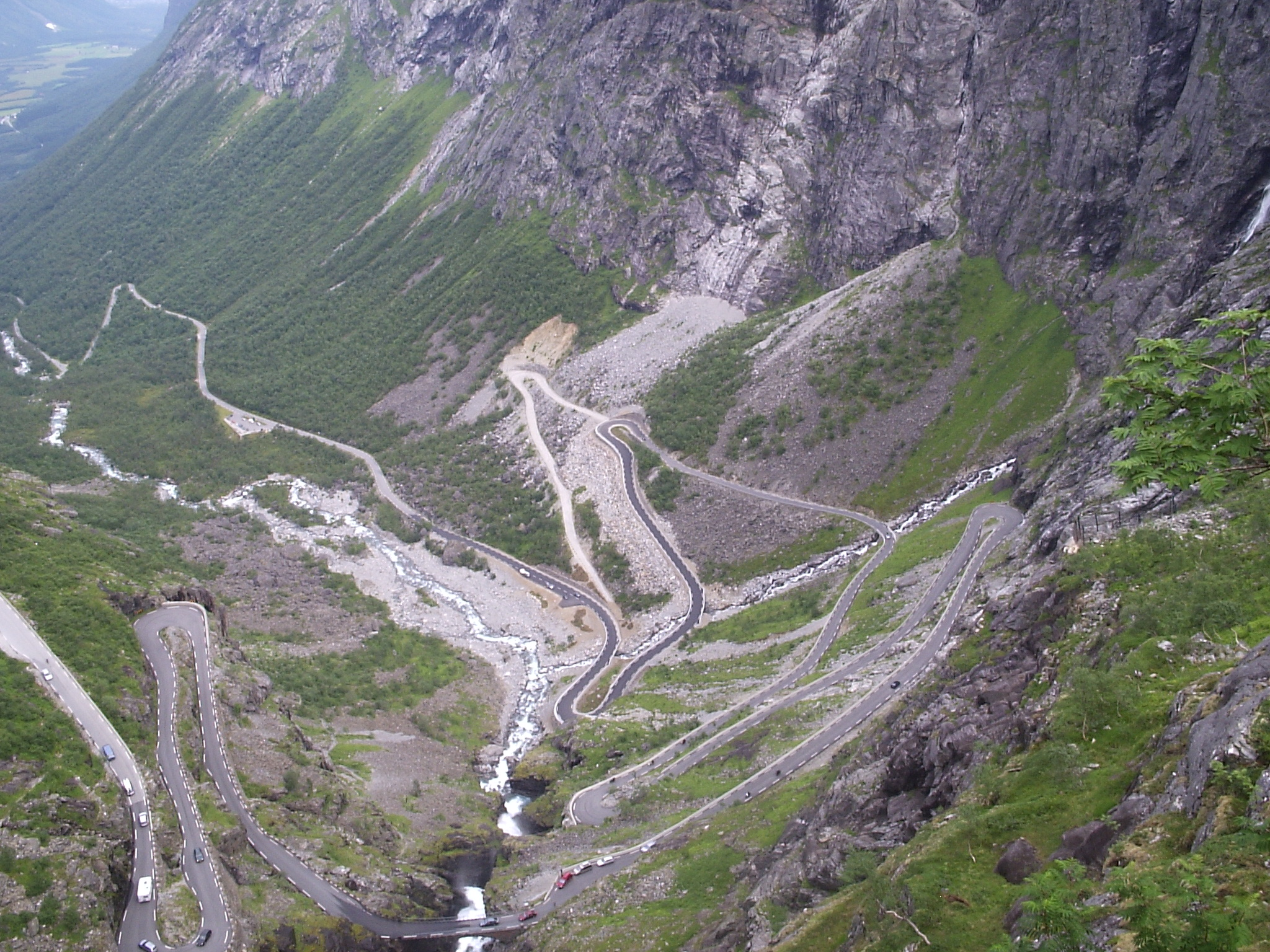
Trollstigen after modifications in 2005

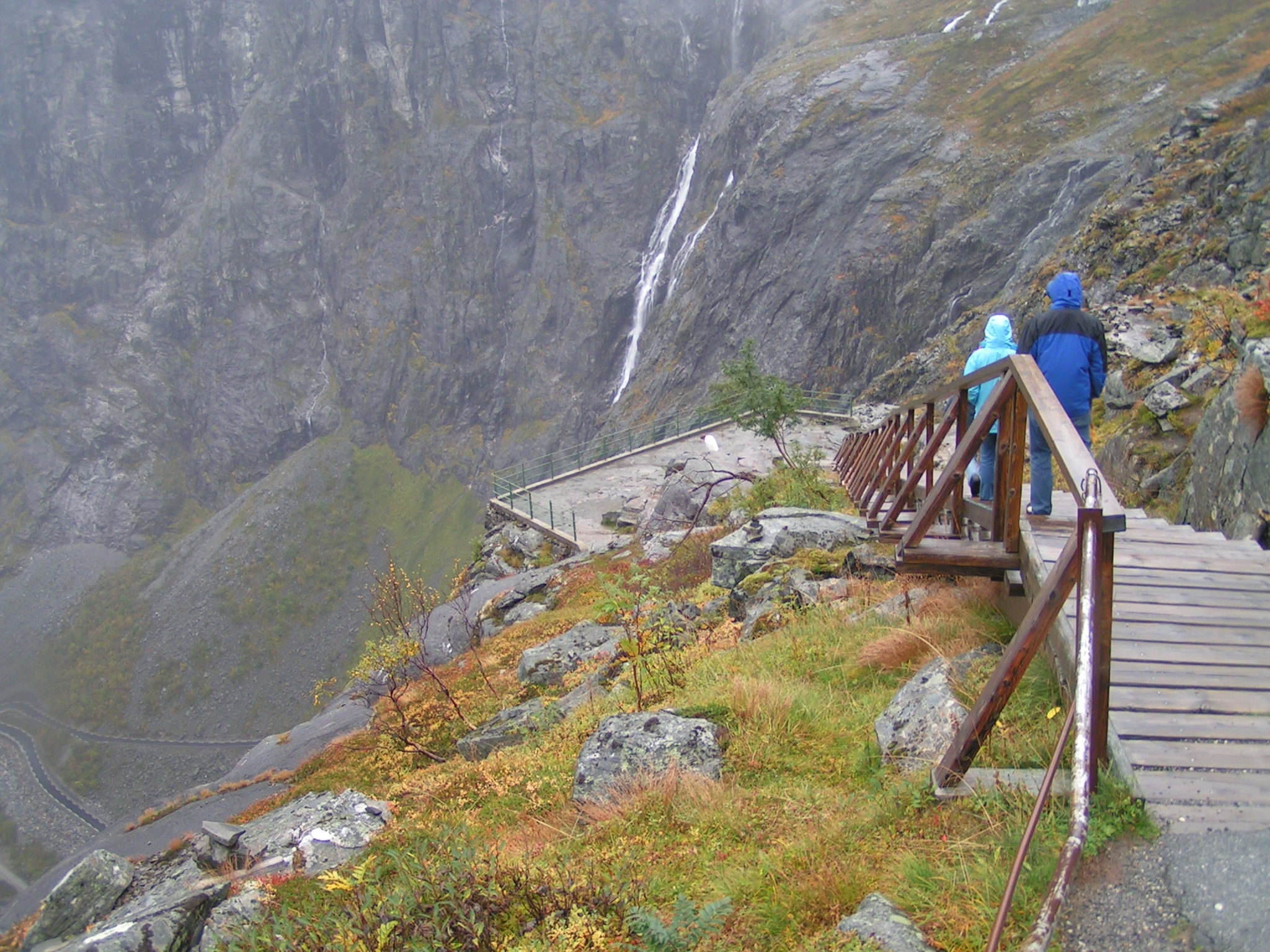
Trollstigen viewing platform

Trollstigen (or trollstigvegen; English: The troll path) is a serpentine mountain road and pass in Rauma Municipality, Møre og Romsdal County, Norway.

It is part of Norwegian County Road 63 that connects the town of Åndalsnes in Rauma and the village of Valldal in Fjord Municipality. It is a popular tourist attraction for its steep incline of 10% and eleven hairpin bends up a steep mountainside. During the peak of the tourist season, about 2,500 vehicles pass daily pass this landmark. During the 2012 season, 161,421 vehicles traversed the route, compared to 155,230 vehicles during 2009.

The road is narrow with many sharp bends, and although several bends were widened during 2005 to 2012, vehicles over 12.4 metres (41 ft) long are prohibited from driving the road. During the 2011 and 2012 seasons, buses up to 13.1 metres (43 ft) were temporarily allowed as a trial. At the 700-metre (2,300 ft) plateau are a car park and several viewing balconies overlooking the bends and the Stigfossen waterfall. Stigfossen falls 320 metres (1,050 ft) down the mountainside. The pass has an elevation of approximately 850 metres (2,790 ft).

Trollstigen is closed during late autumn and winter. A normal operating season stretches from mid-May to October but is sometimes be shorter or longer because of weather conditions.

== Etymology ==
Trollstigen means the troll path or troll trail, from the Norwegian stig (also spelled sti), from Old Norse stigr.

== History ==
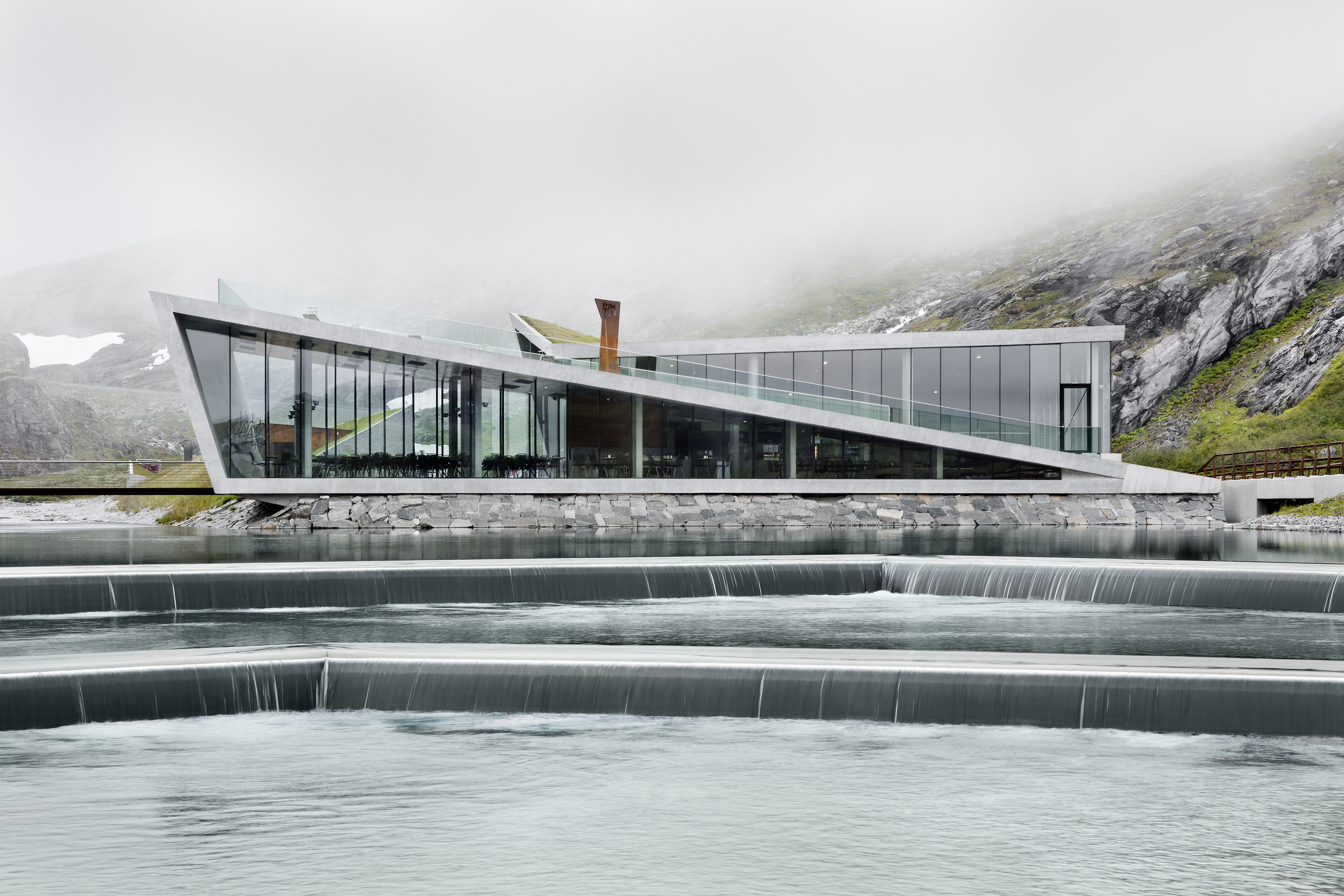
Visitor centre opened in 2012

Trollstigen was opened on 31 July 1936 by King Haakon VII after eight years of construction.

A major tourist facility including a restaurant was completed in 2012. Several viewing platforms have been constructed and older constructions improved upon. Trollstigen (along with County Road 63) was officially opened as a national tourist route by the Minister of Transport and Communications on 16 June 2012. Trollstigen itself (and the alpine summits to the west) lies within the Trollstigen landscape protection area, while the alpine area east of Trollstigen, including the Trolltindene range, is part of Reinheimen National Park.

In the summer of 2005, the road was repaired, and about 16 million Norwegian kroner was spent to protect from rockfalls and make driving on the road safer.

In June 2021, Telia Norge commissioned an eco-friendly mobile base station powered entirely by solar, wind and hydrogen to provide mobile phone coverage at Trollstigen for the first time ever.

== Opening and closing dates ==
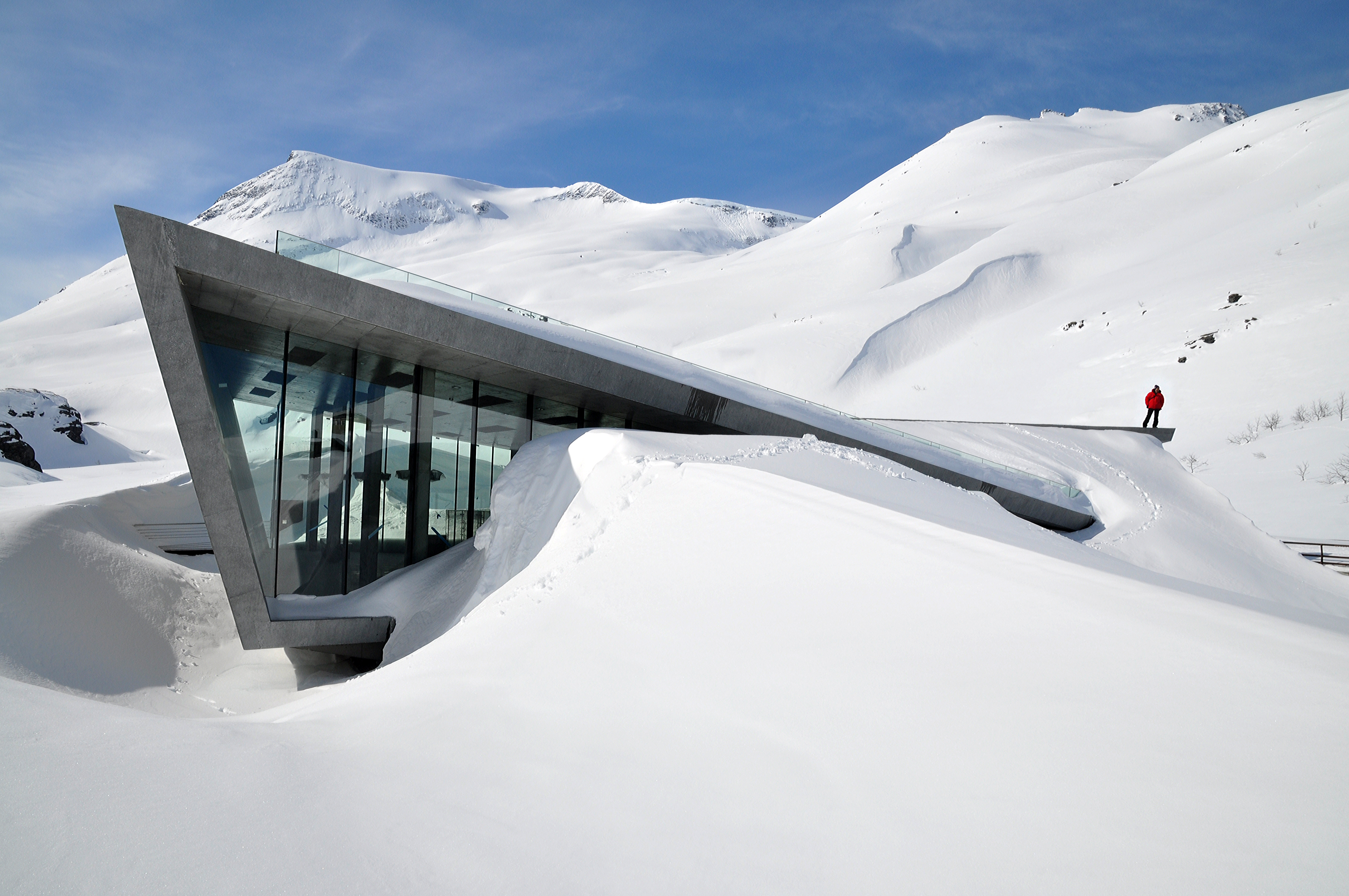
Trollstigen visitor center in April, when the road is still closed during winter

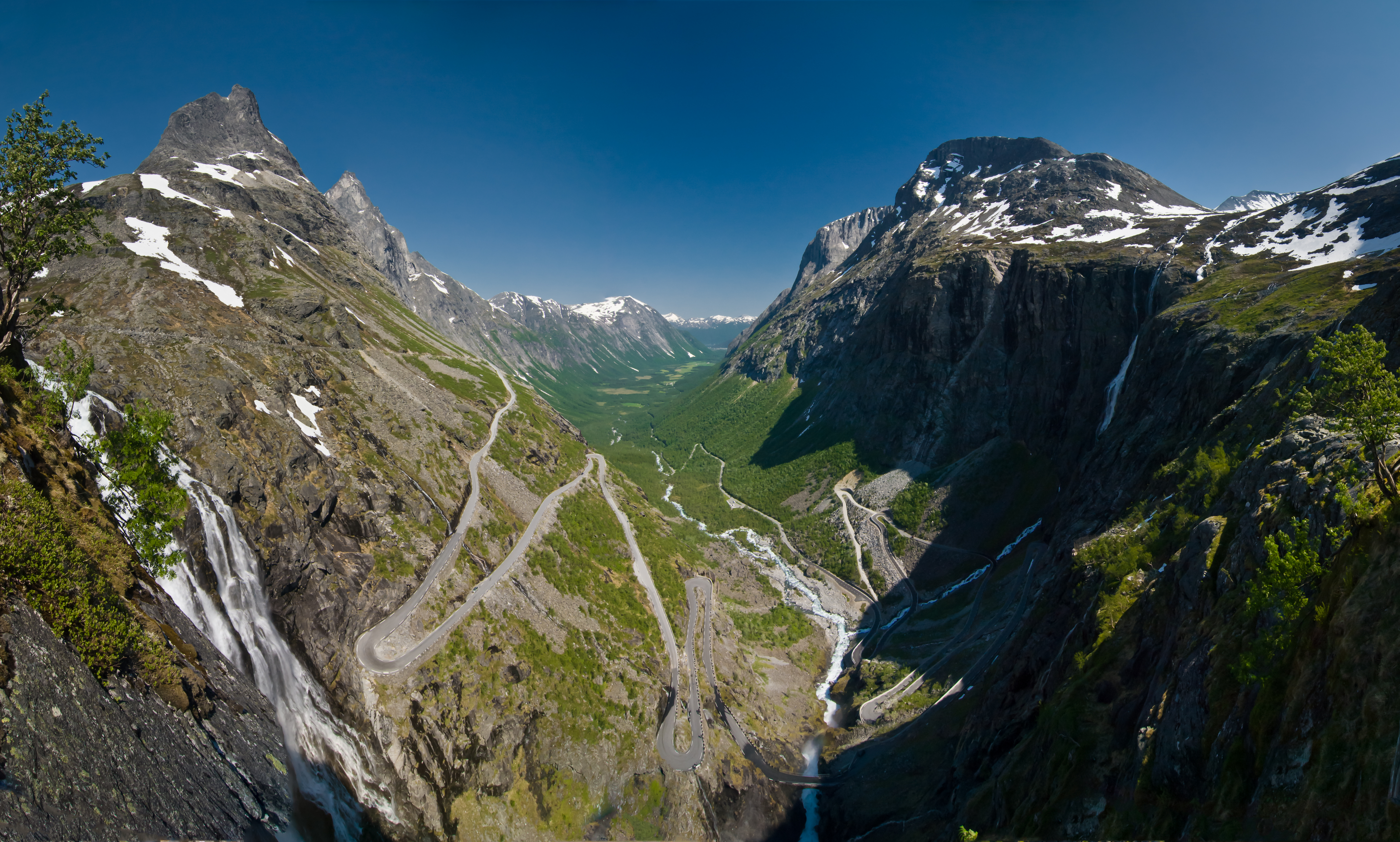

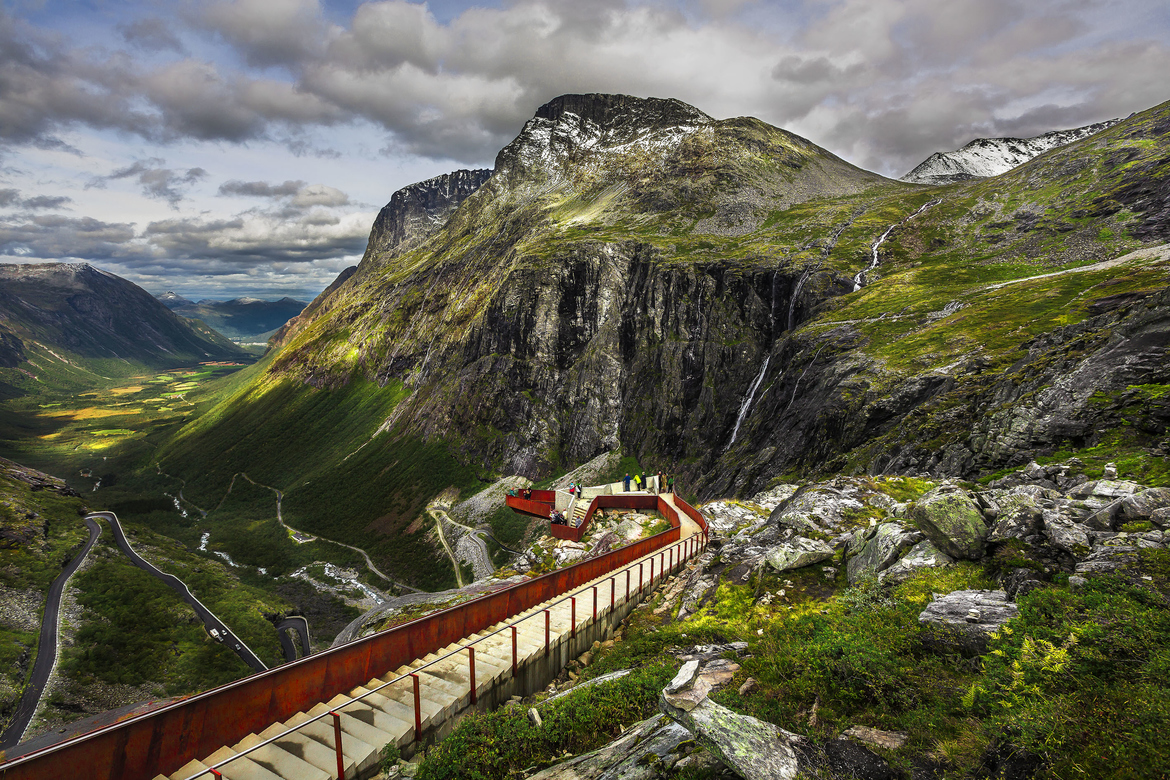
Viewpoint at the Trollstigen road.

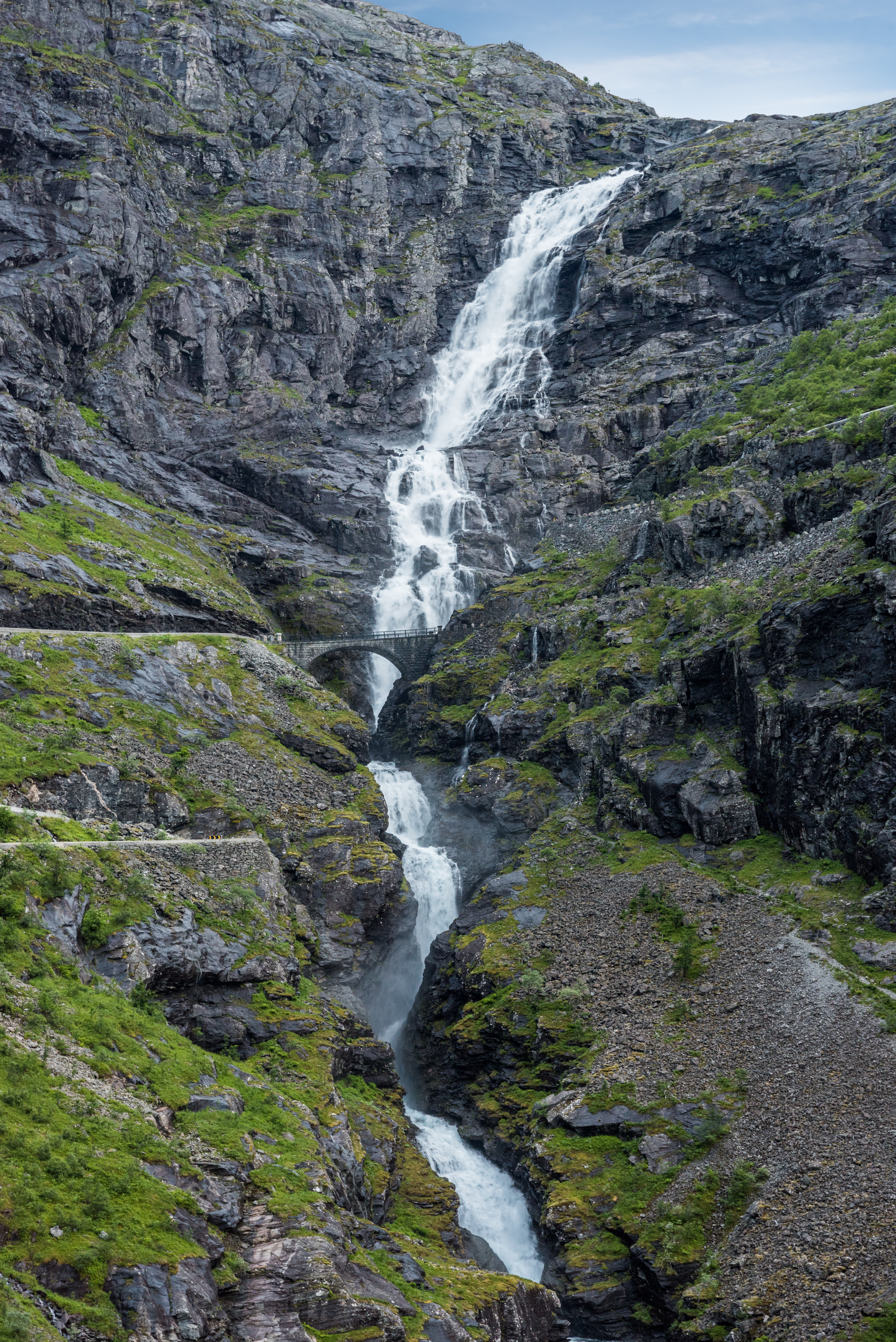
Stigfossen waterfall has a total fall of about 240 meters

Year	Open	Closed	Comment
1994	20 May	27 September	
1995	25 May		
1996	24 May		
1997	6 June	24 September	
1998	15 May	15 October	closed because of snow
1999	14 May	10 September	temporarily closed 9 August because of landslide, early winter closing because of construction work.
2000	26 May	20 August	closed early because of construction work
2001	21 May	21 August	closed early because of construction work
2002	23 May	16 September	Early closing because of maintenance work.
2003	28 May	15 August	closed early because of landslide and flooding
2004	29 May		
2005	1 June	15 November	latest closing since 1992
2006	3 May		
2007	23 May	17 October	
2008	27 May	4 November	
2009	20 May	23 October	closed because of avalanche
2010	28 May	4 November	
2011	13 May	24 November	
2012	1 June	5 November	
2013	22 May	13 November	
2014	8 May	1 December 8 December	temporarily closed 23 November
2015	13 May	24 November 23 November	
2016	25 May	3 November	Closed because of snow
2017	24 May	13 November 8 November	
2018	11 May	26 October, open again 16 November	closed for the winter 26 October, open again 16 November because of warm weather Closed 2 December because of storm.
2019	16 May	30 October	
2024		17 June	rockfall
2025	11 July	15 August	roadworks
2026+2027	1 June	15 August	roadworks

== Gallery ==
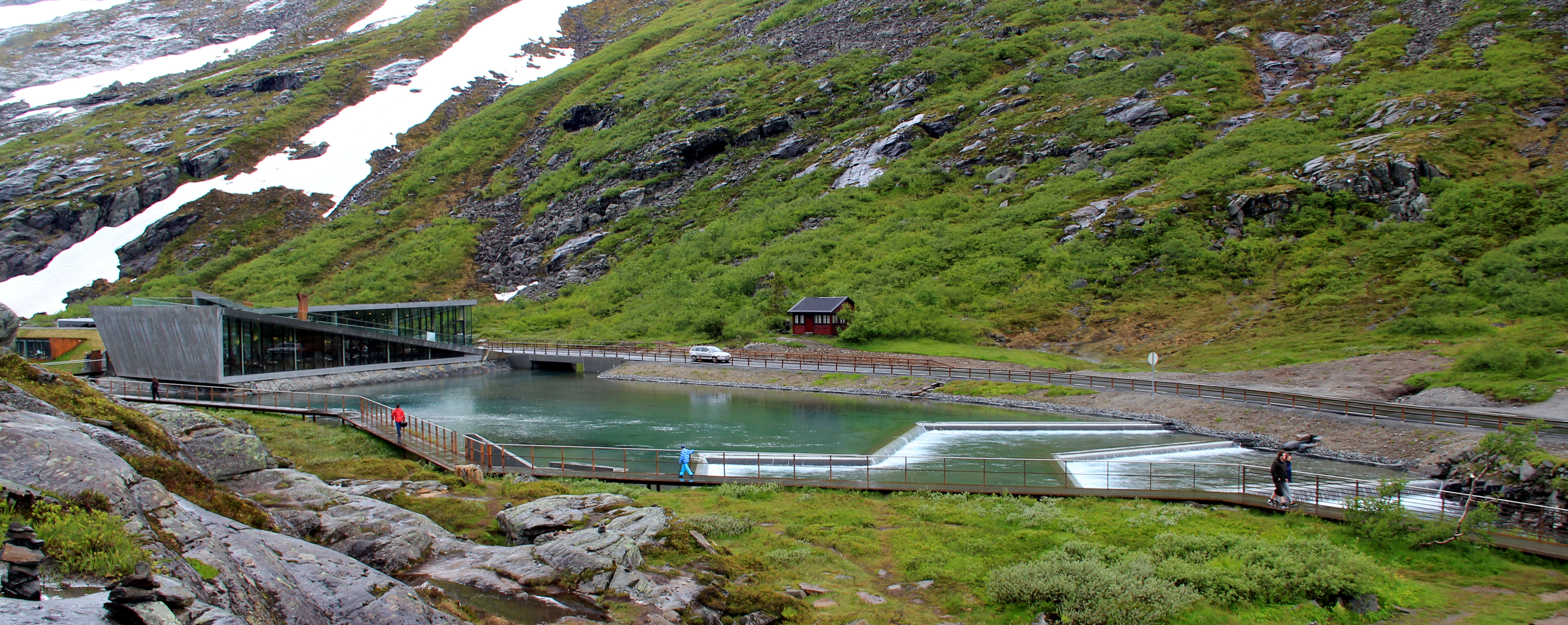
Trollstigen Visitor Center

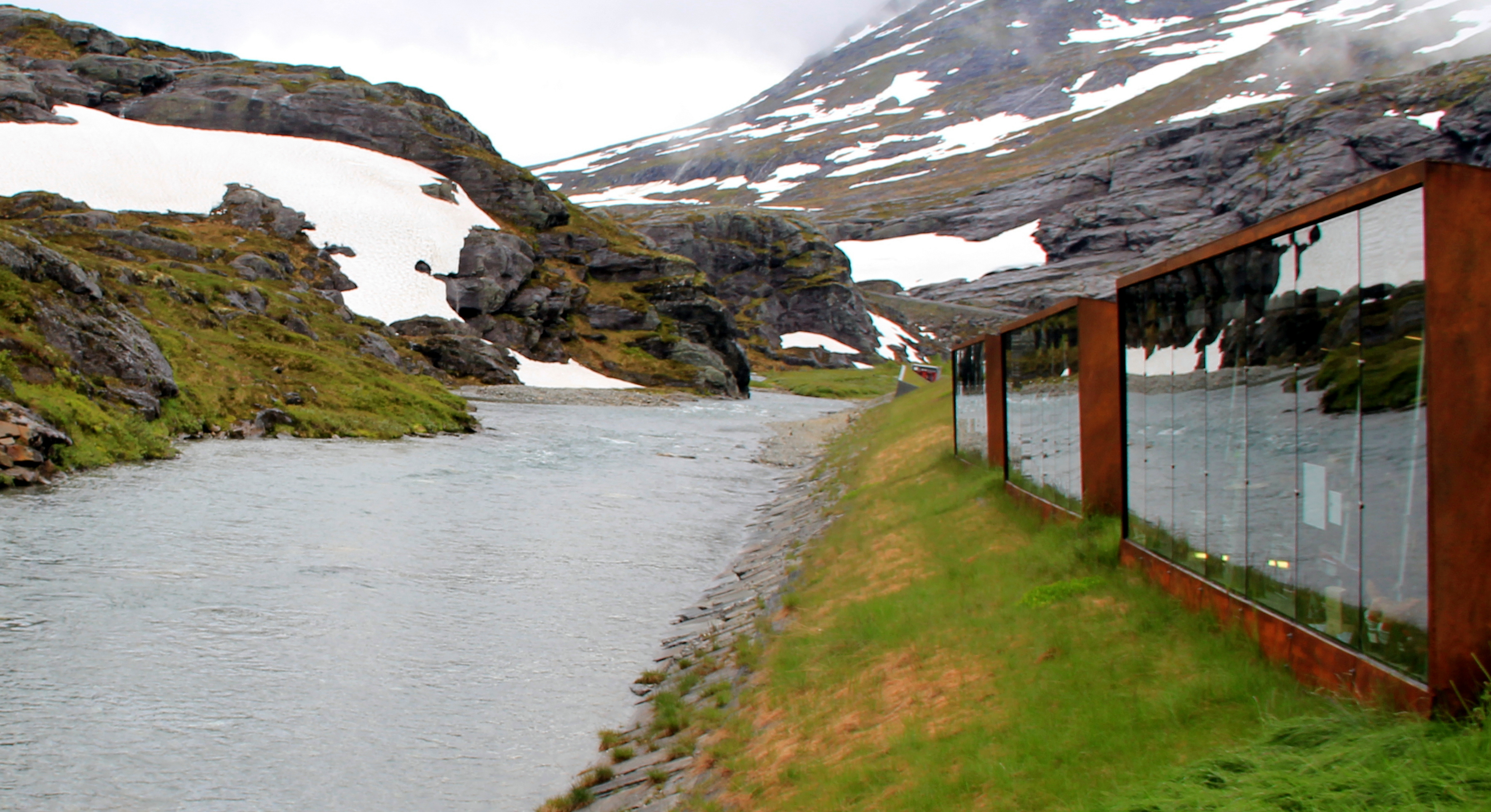
Trollstigen visitor center, with souvenir shops and toilets

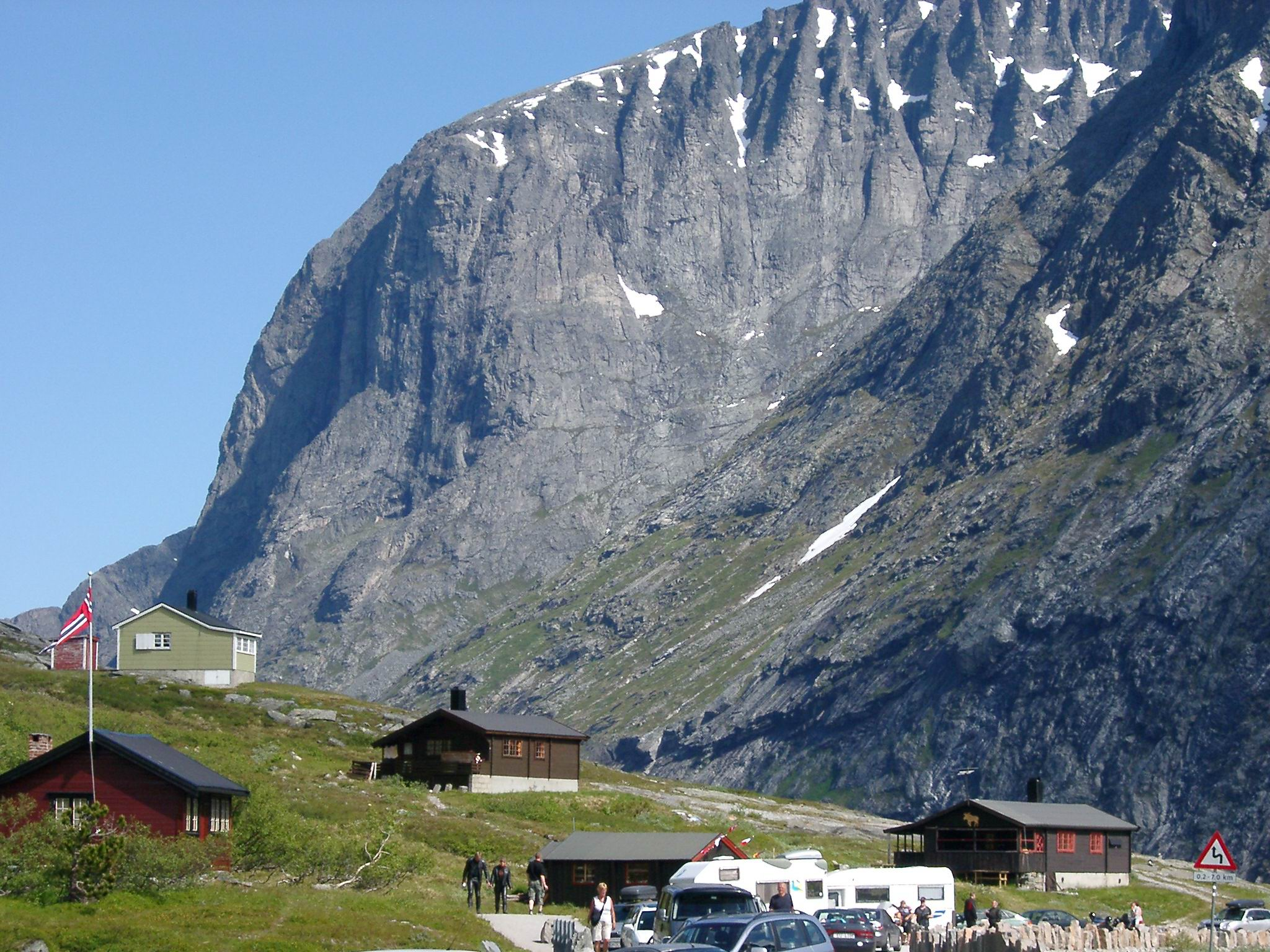
Stigrøra with souvenir sale. In the background the rock formation Trollklørne.

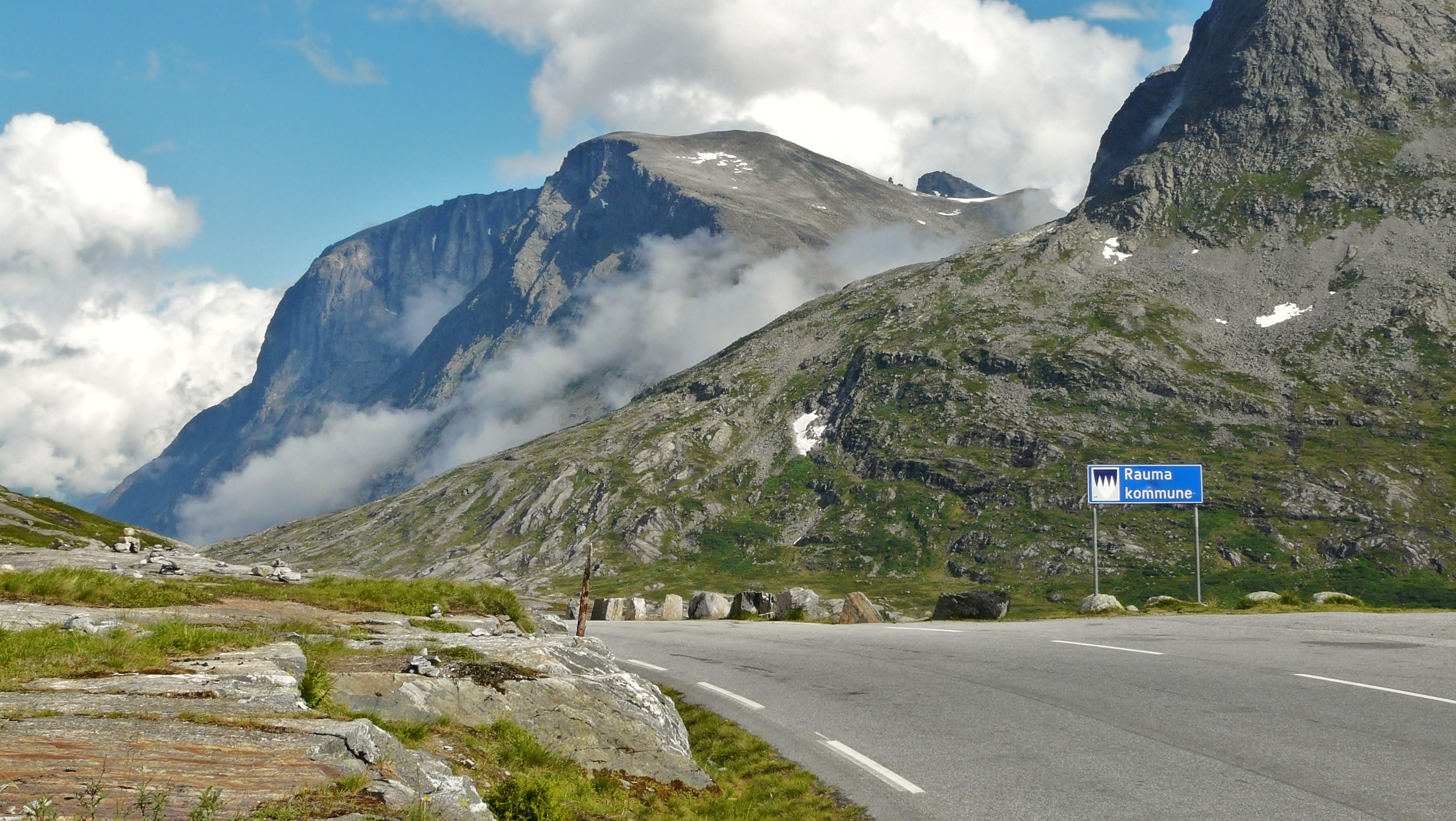
Alnesreset - the highest point on the mountain pass and municipal boundary.

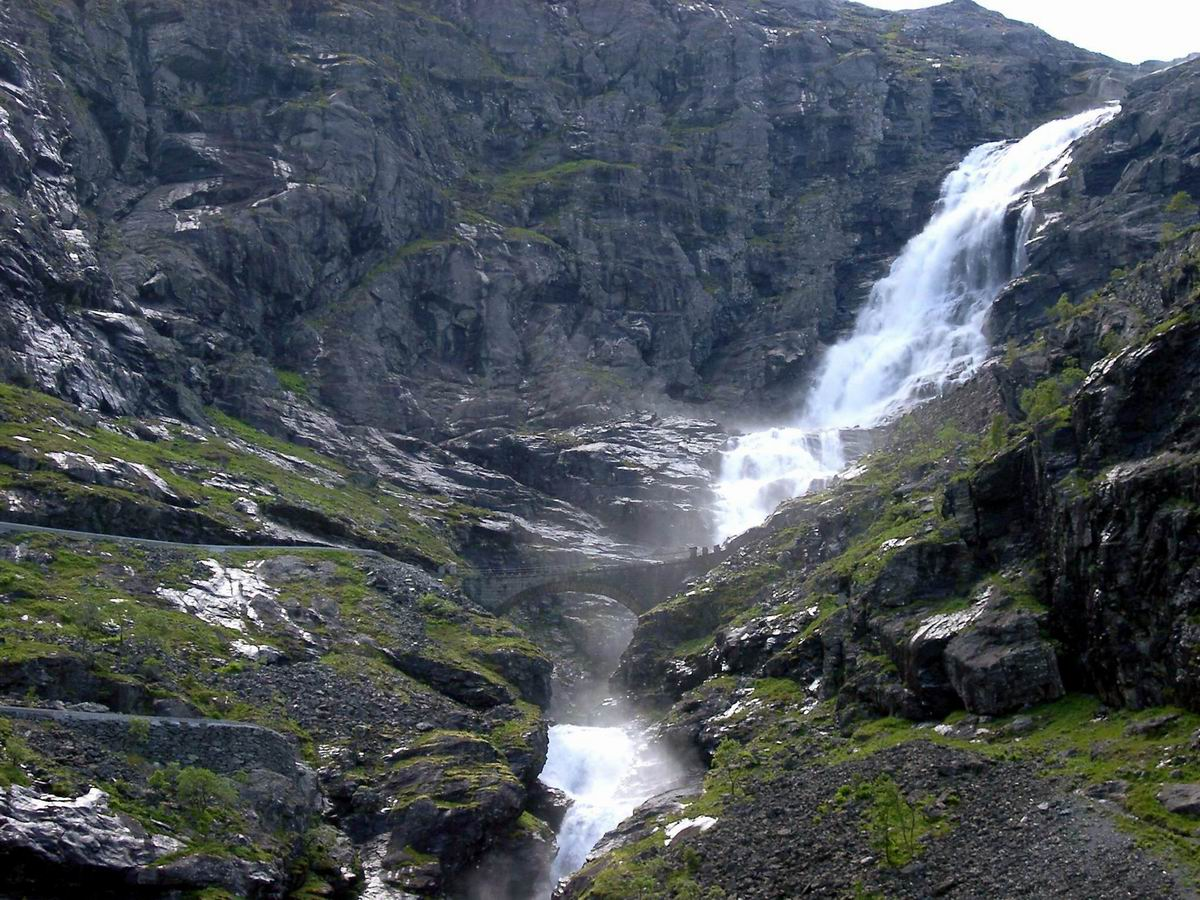
Stigfossen with Stigfossbrua seen from below.

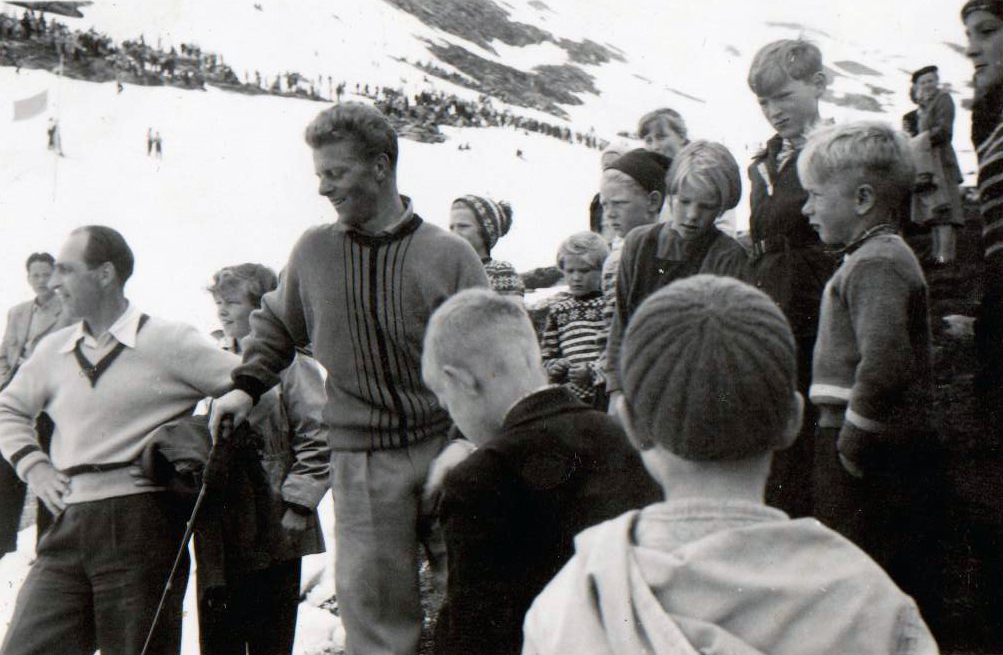
From Trollstigrennet around 1952 (Stein Eriksen with ski pole).

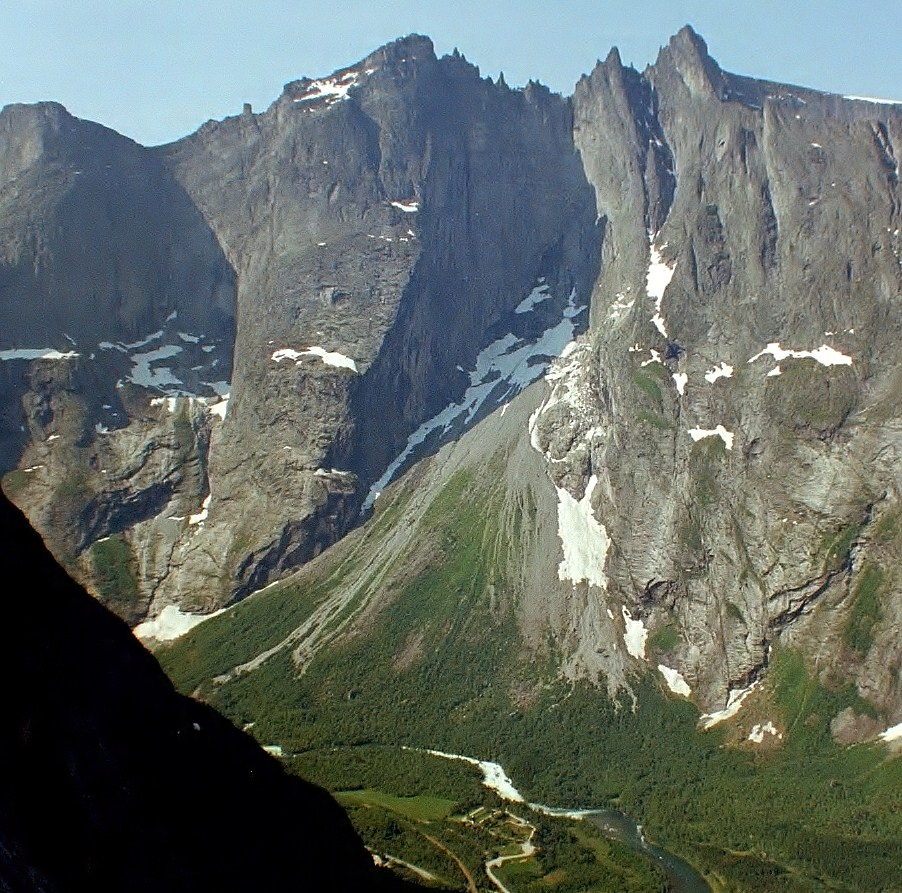
Trollryggen mountains, located between Romsdalen and Trollstigen.

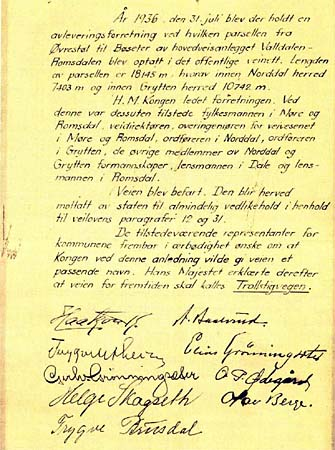
Acception Document for Trollstigvegen in Romsdal signed by Haakon VII (31 July 1936)

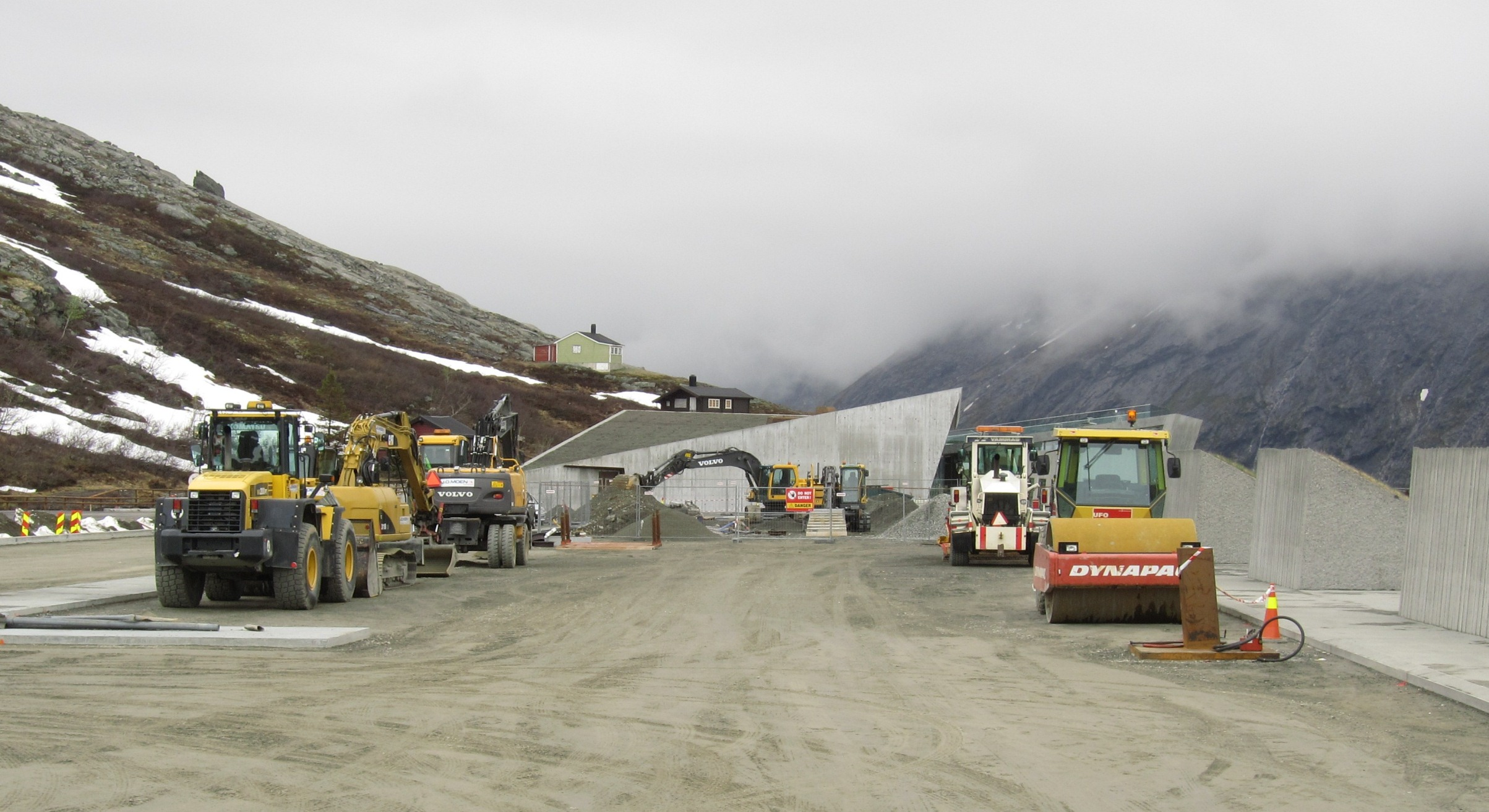
The visitor center just before the official opening (16 June 2012)

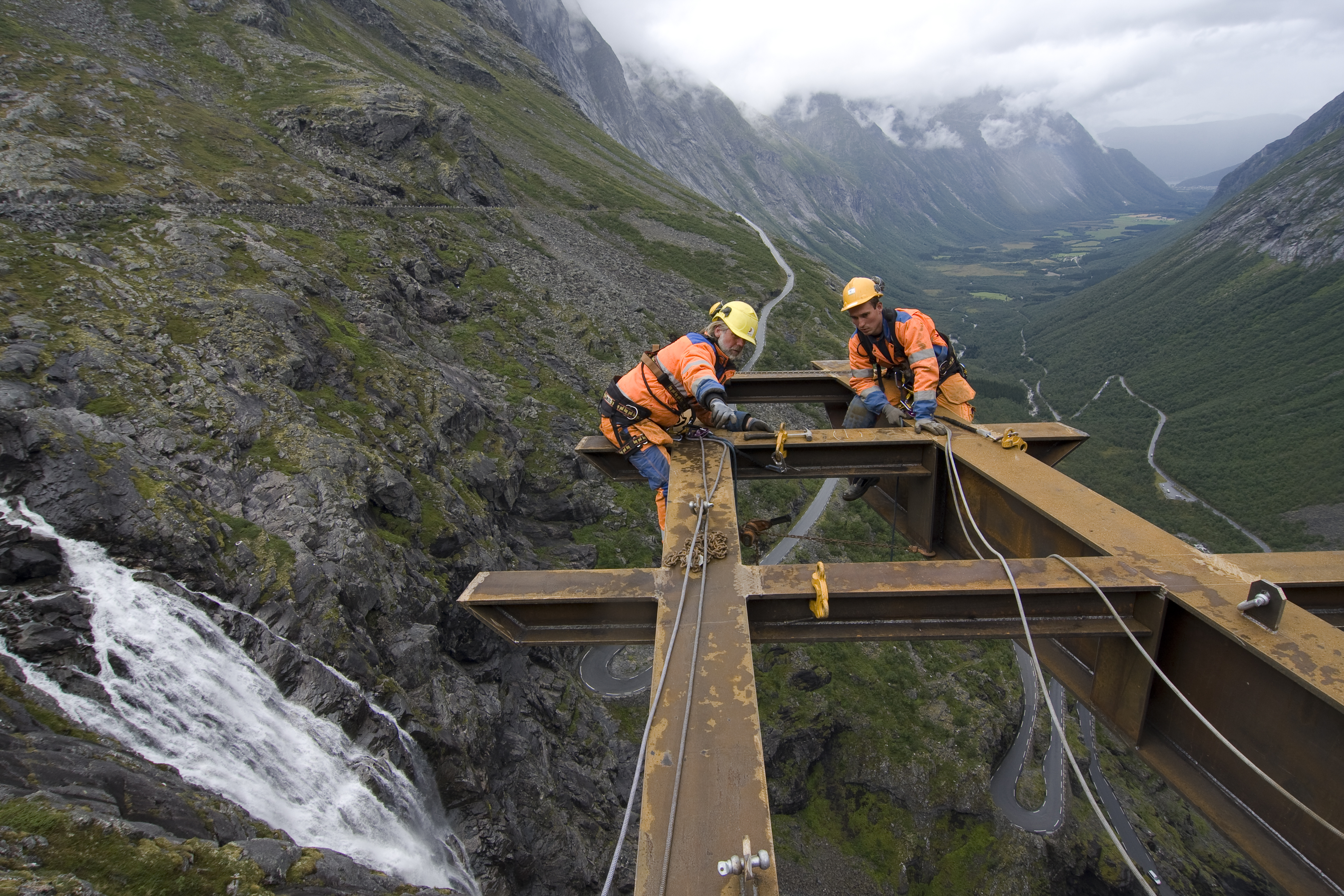
Works on the viewing platform (2008)

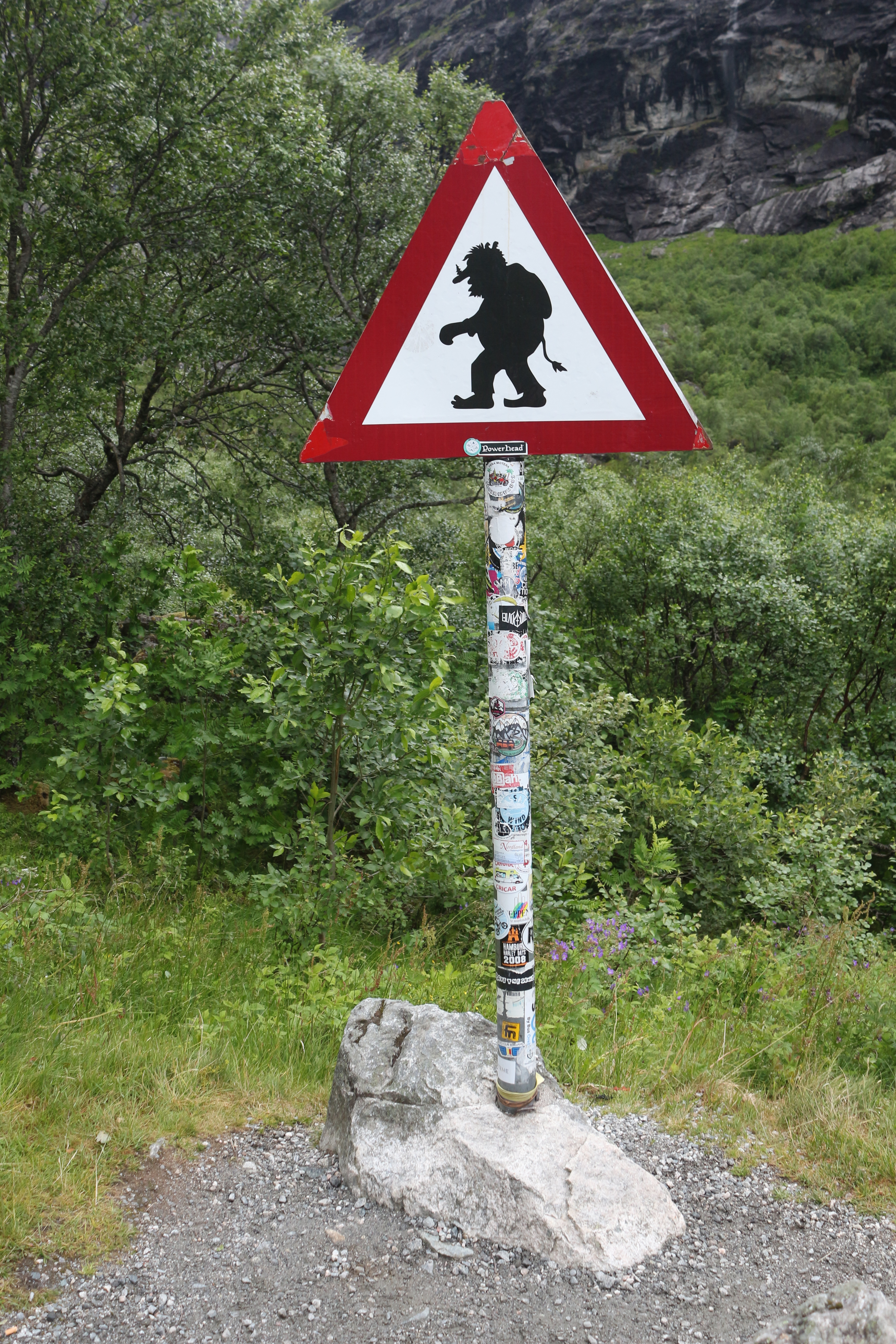
Trollstigen road signs

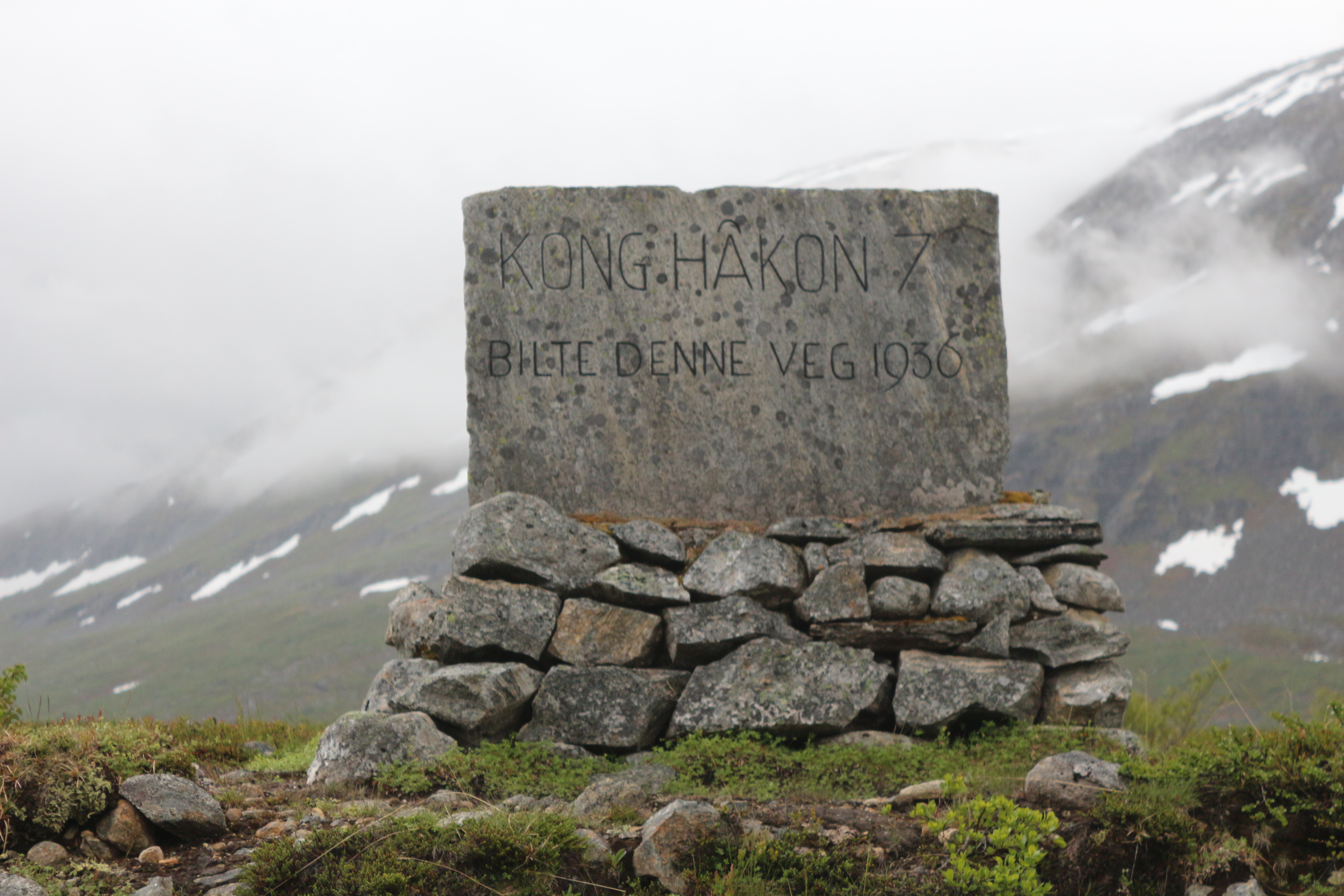
Memorial stone with the text "King Håkon drove this road in 1936"

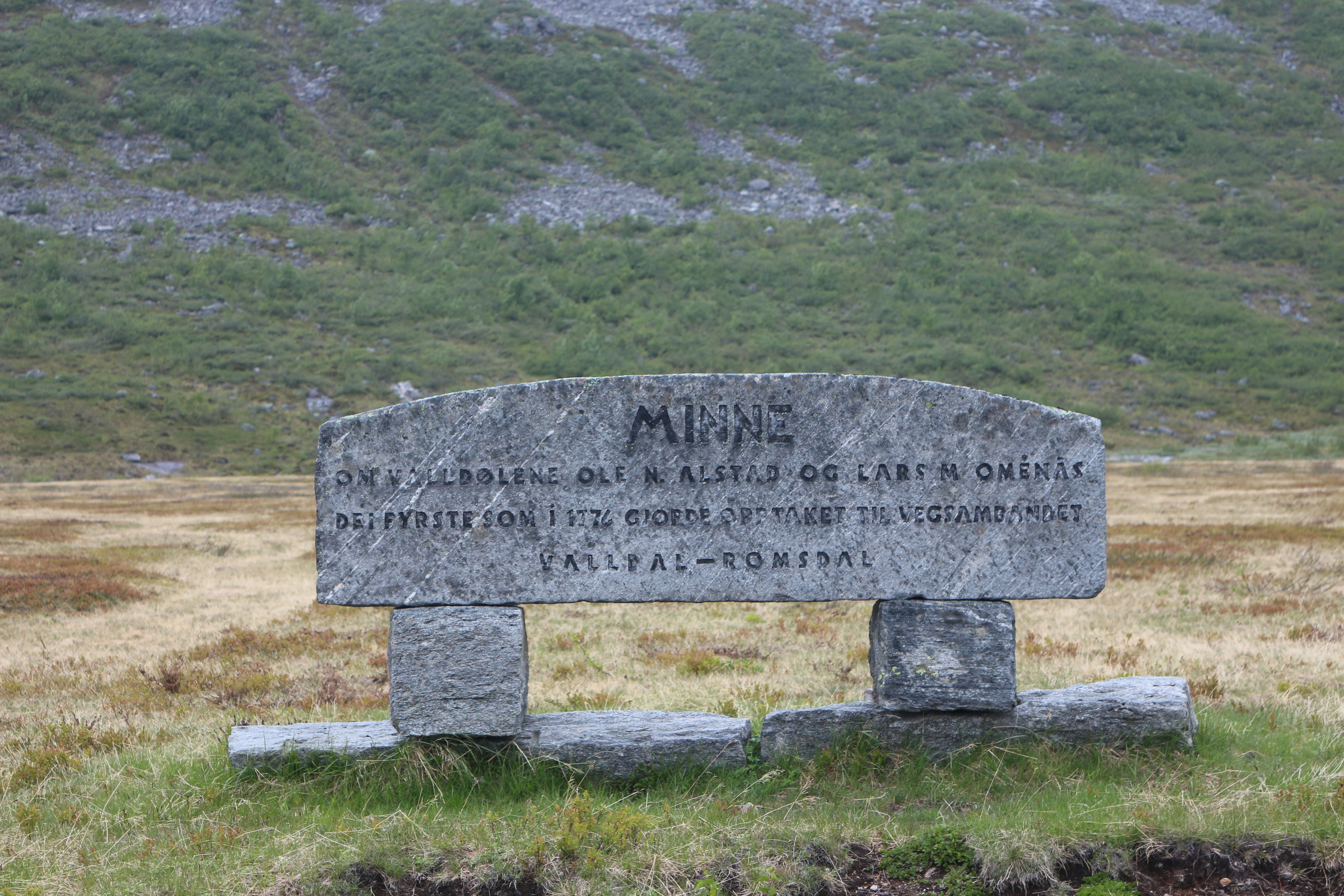
Memorial stone

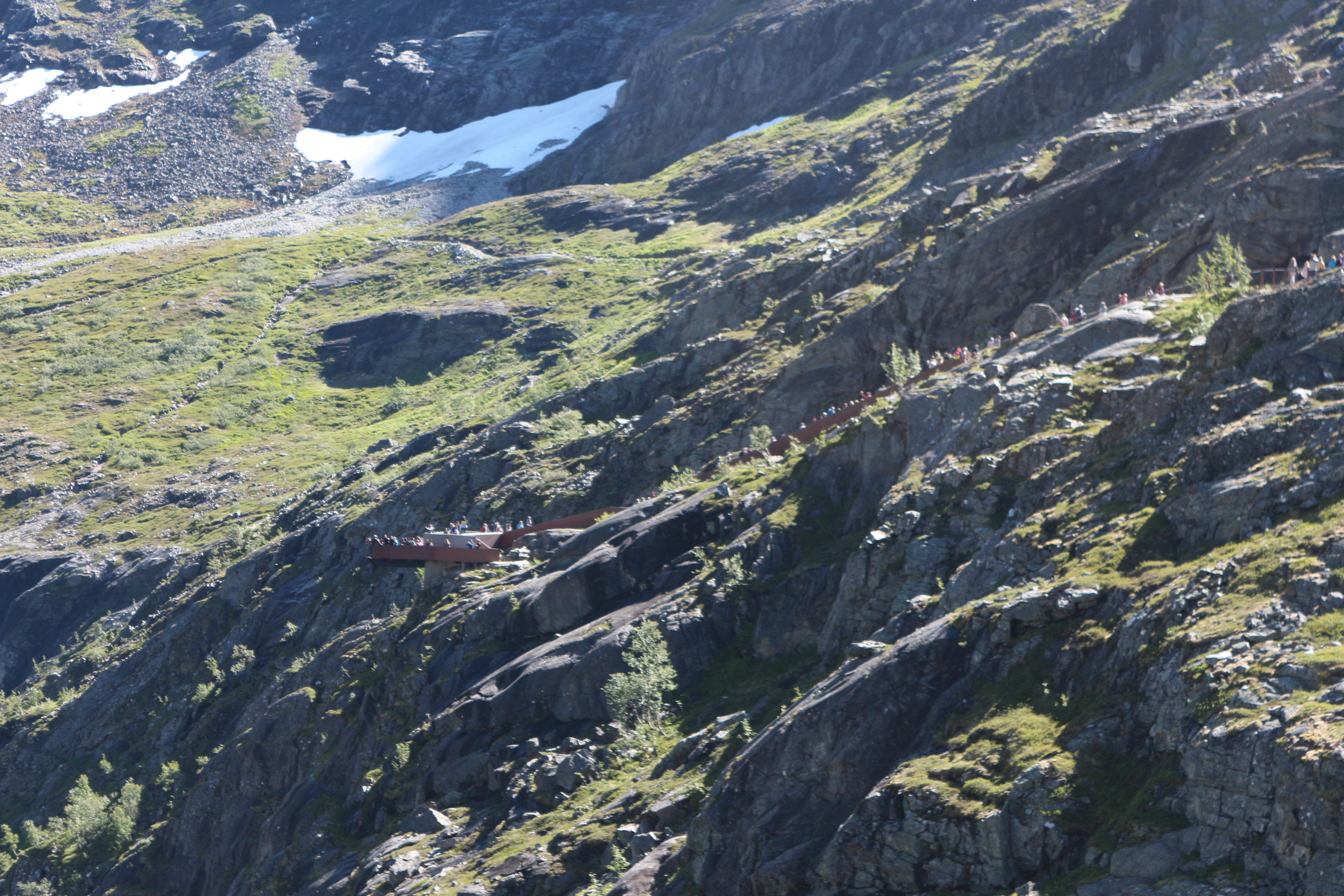
Viewpoint

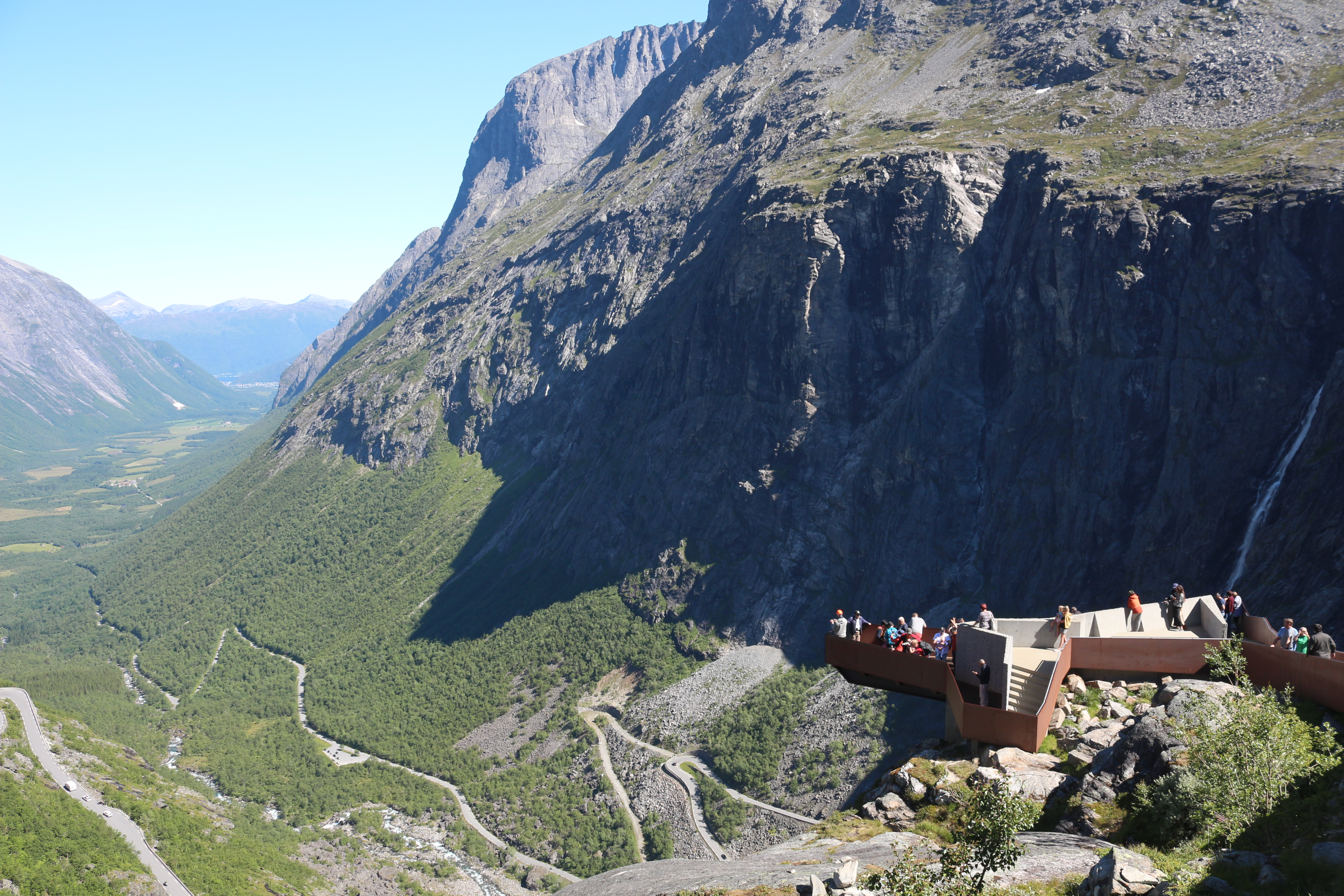
Viewpoint

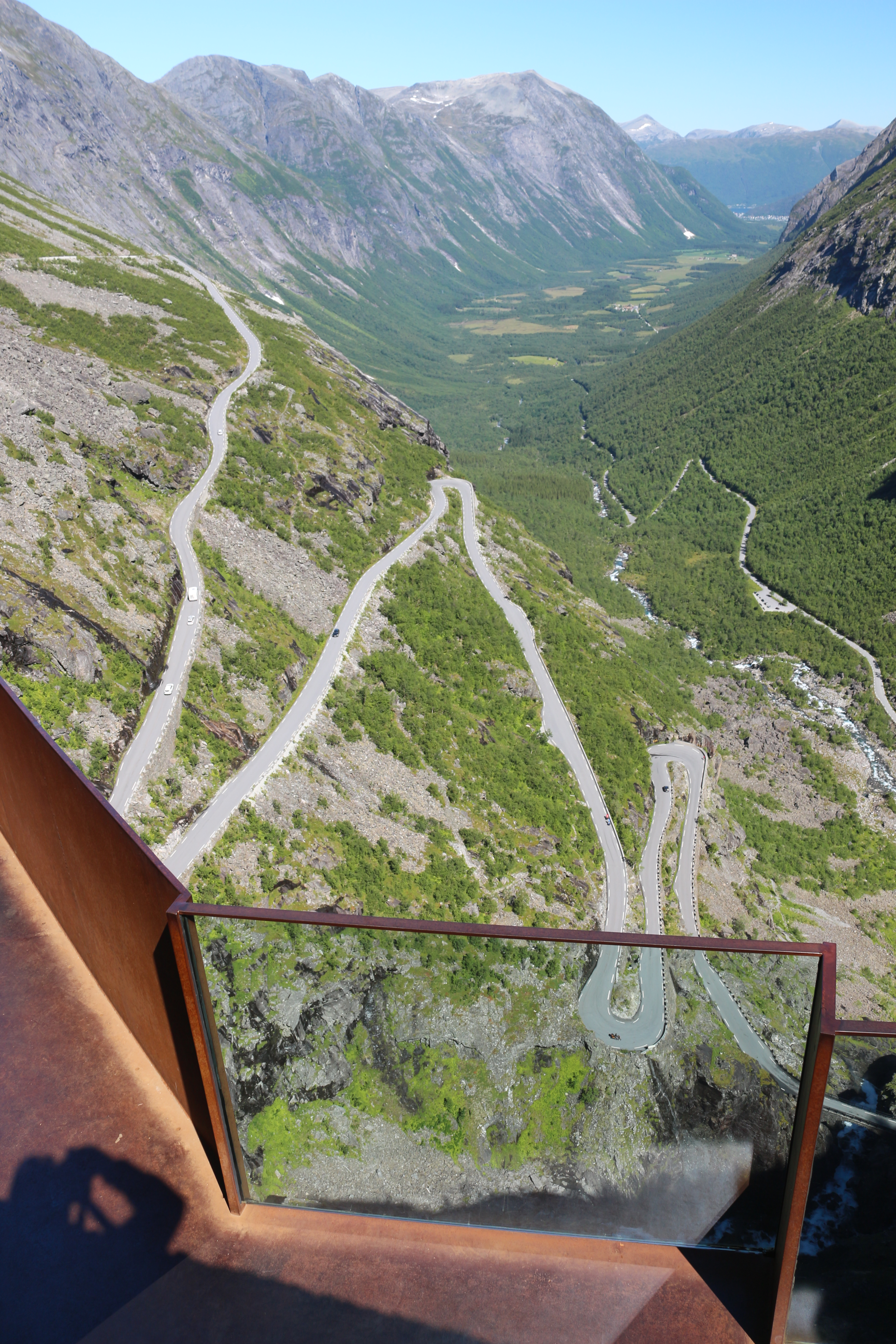
View from the platform

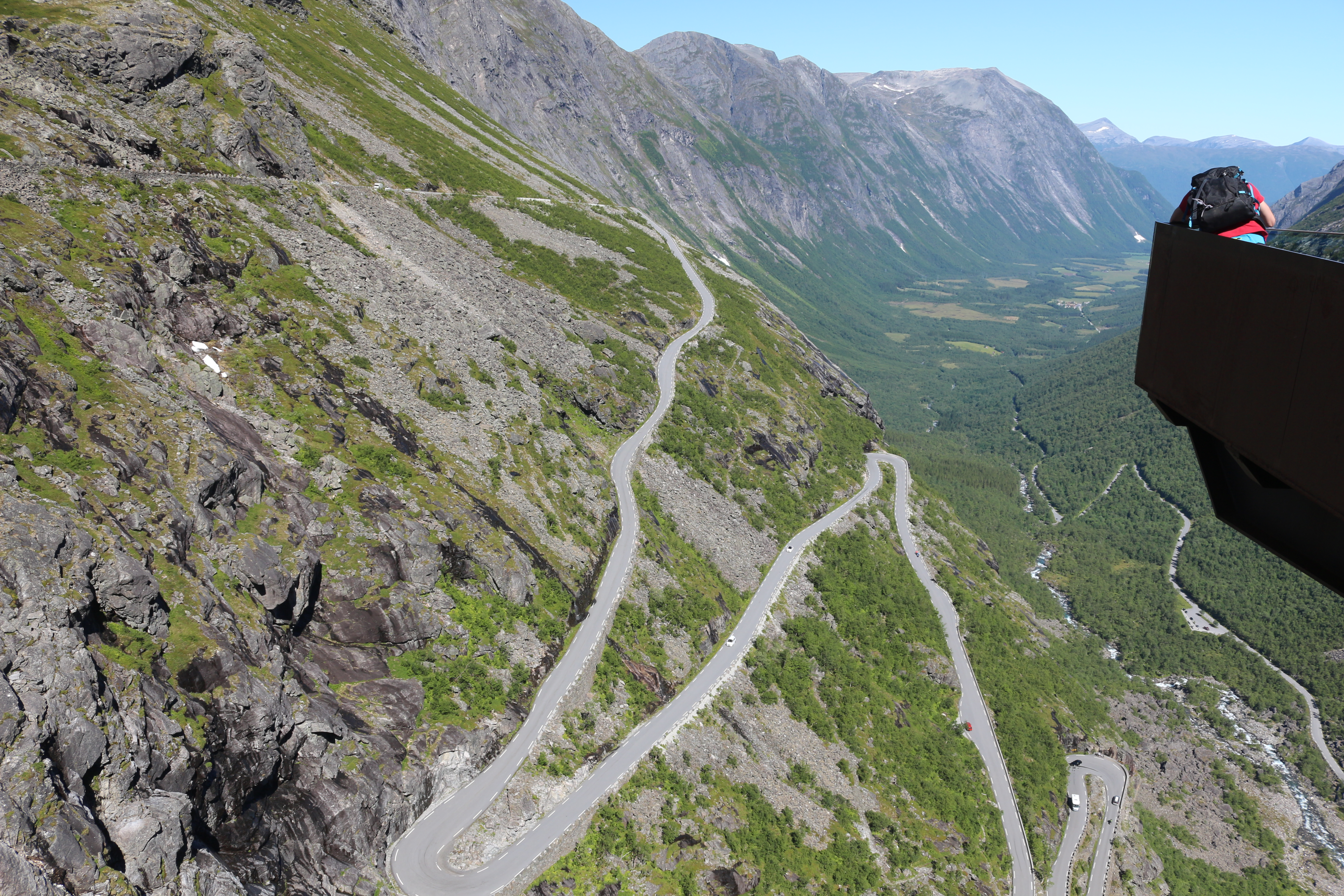
View from the platform

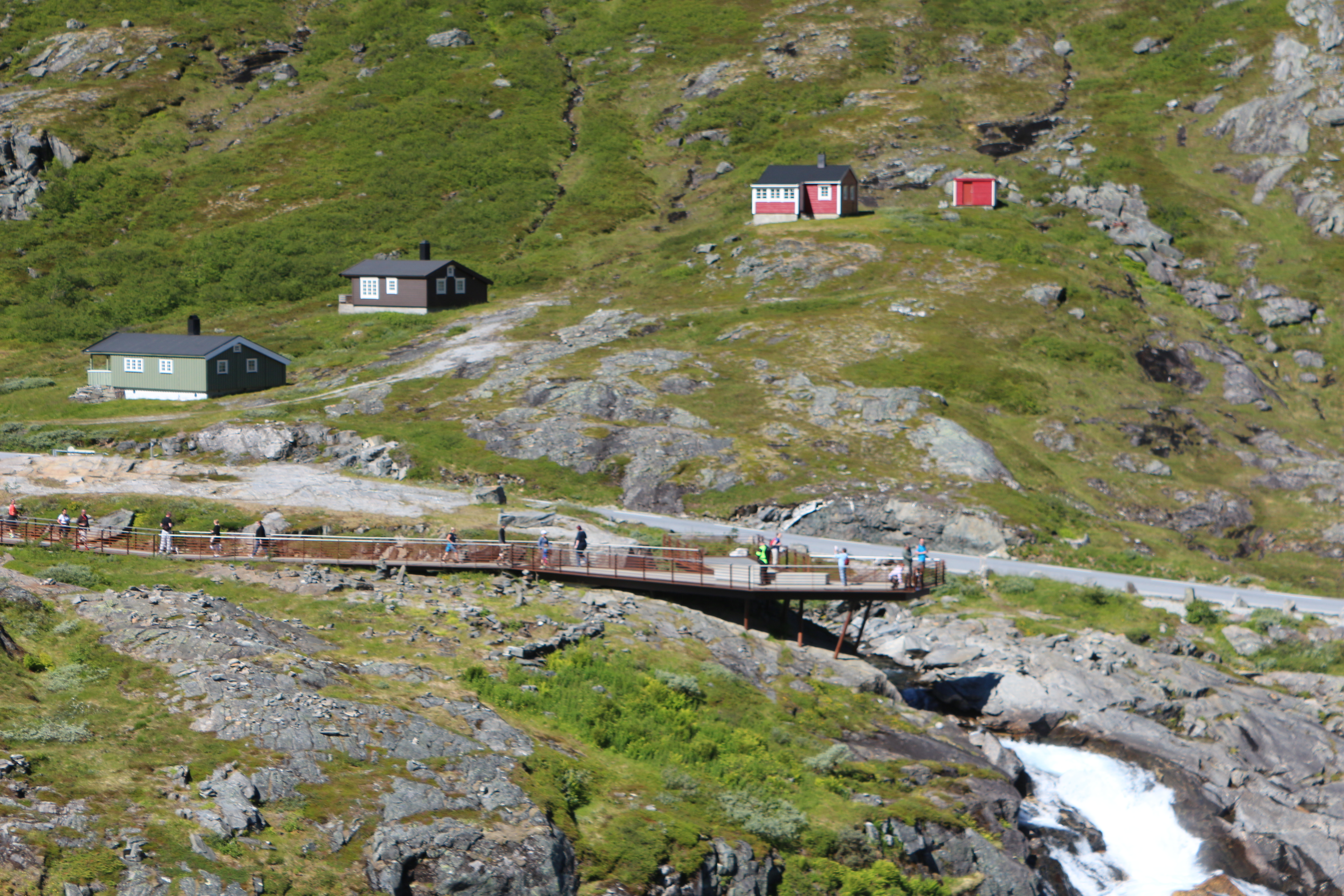
Viewpoint

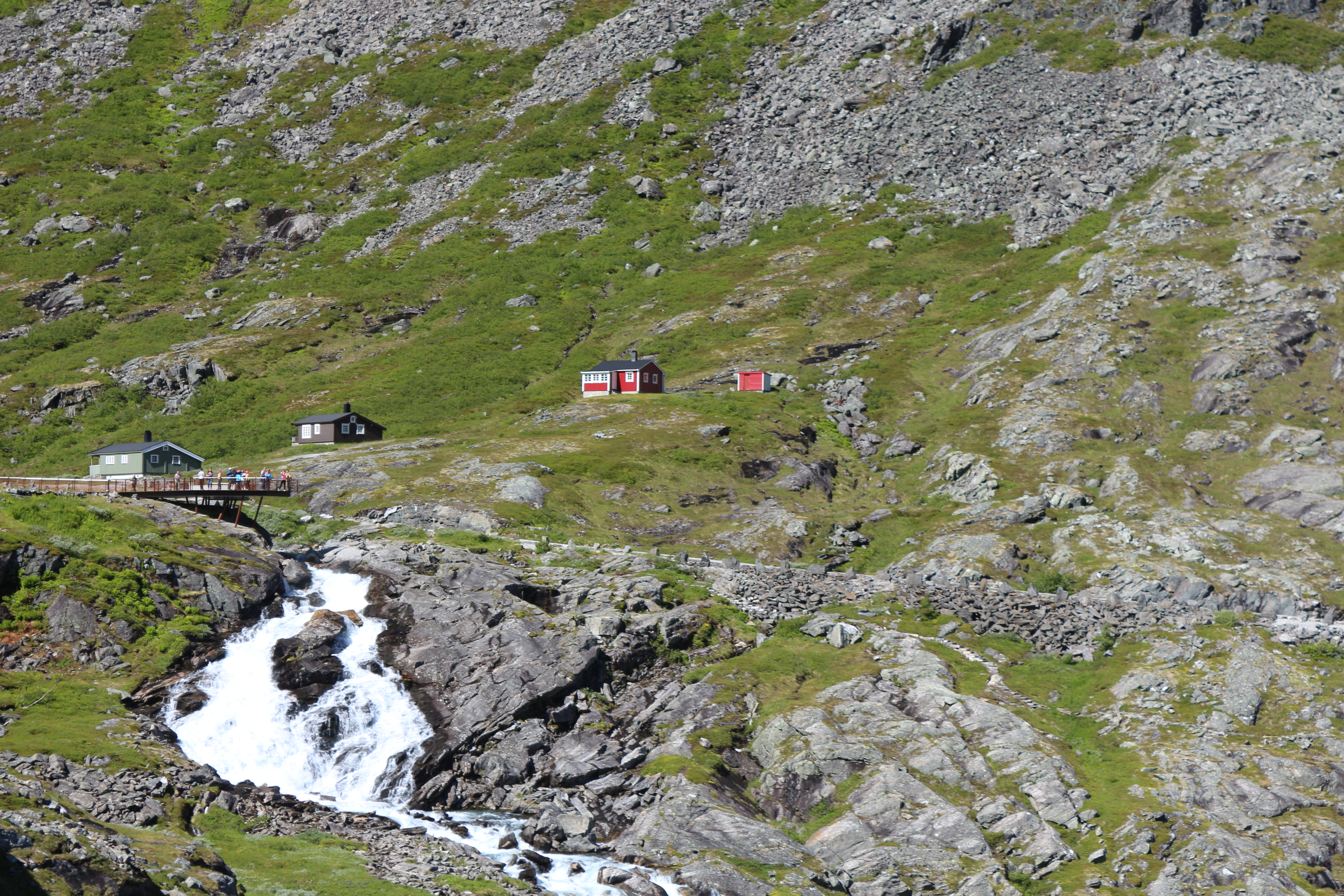
Viewpoint

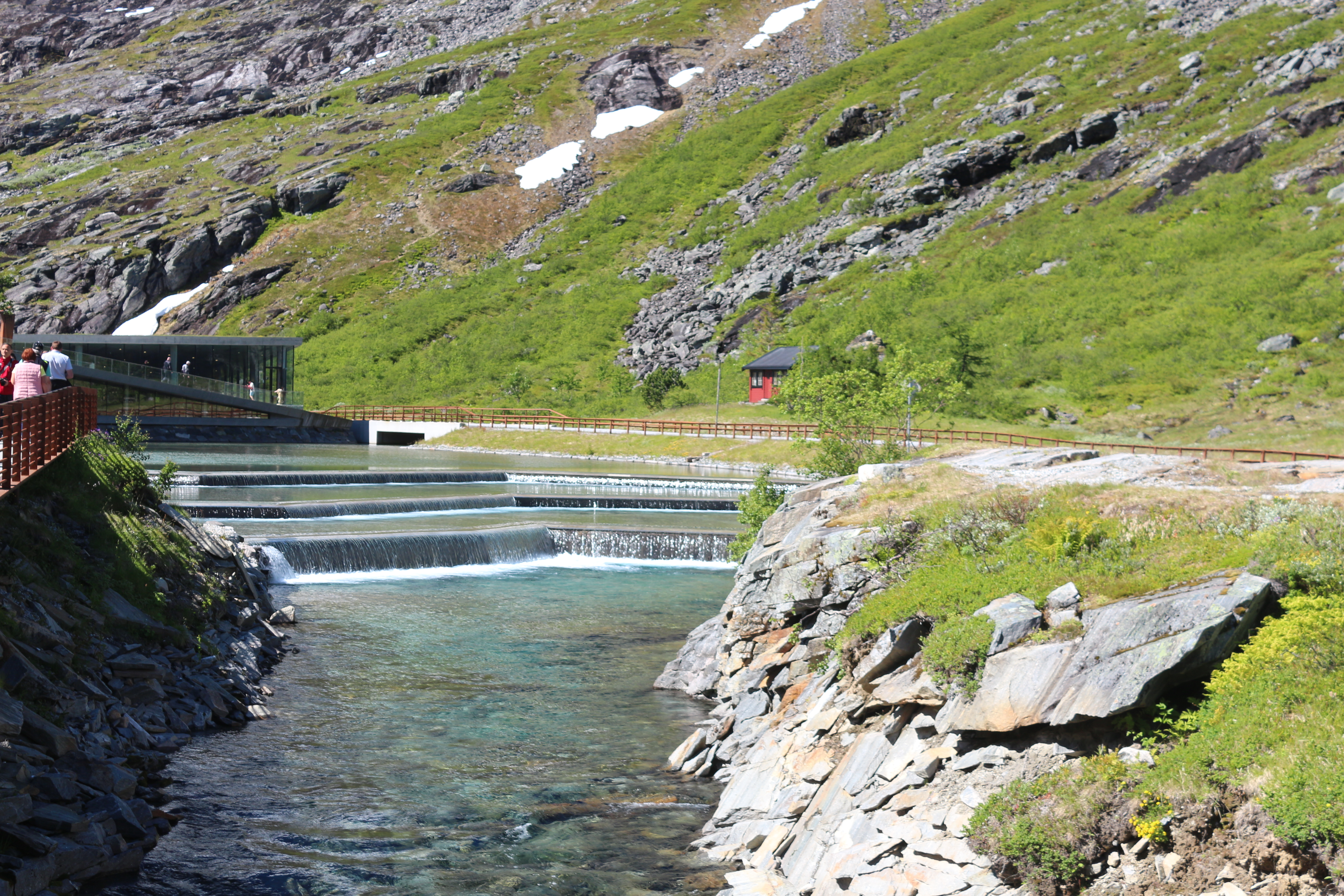
The river

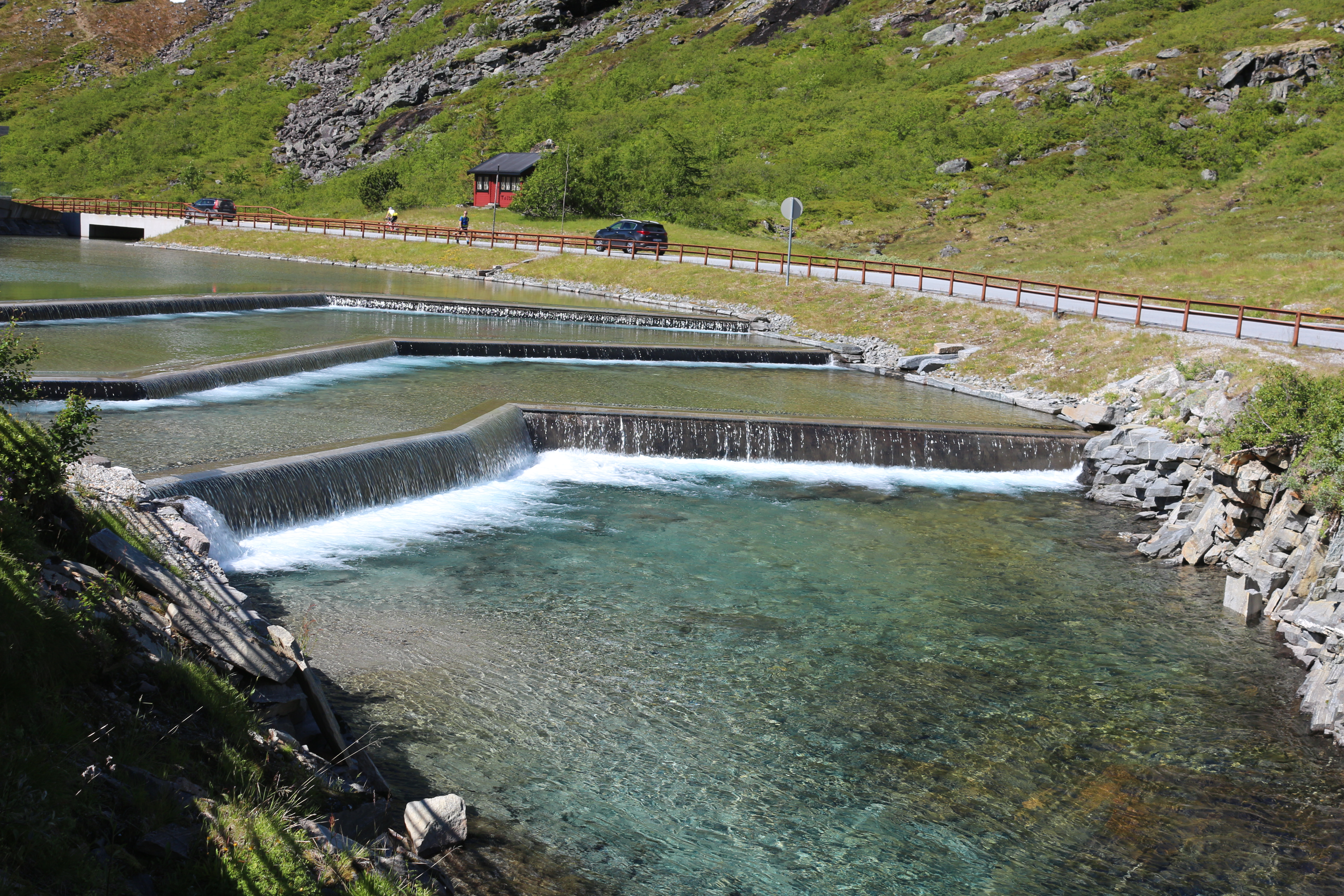
The river

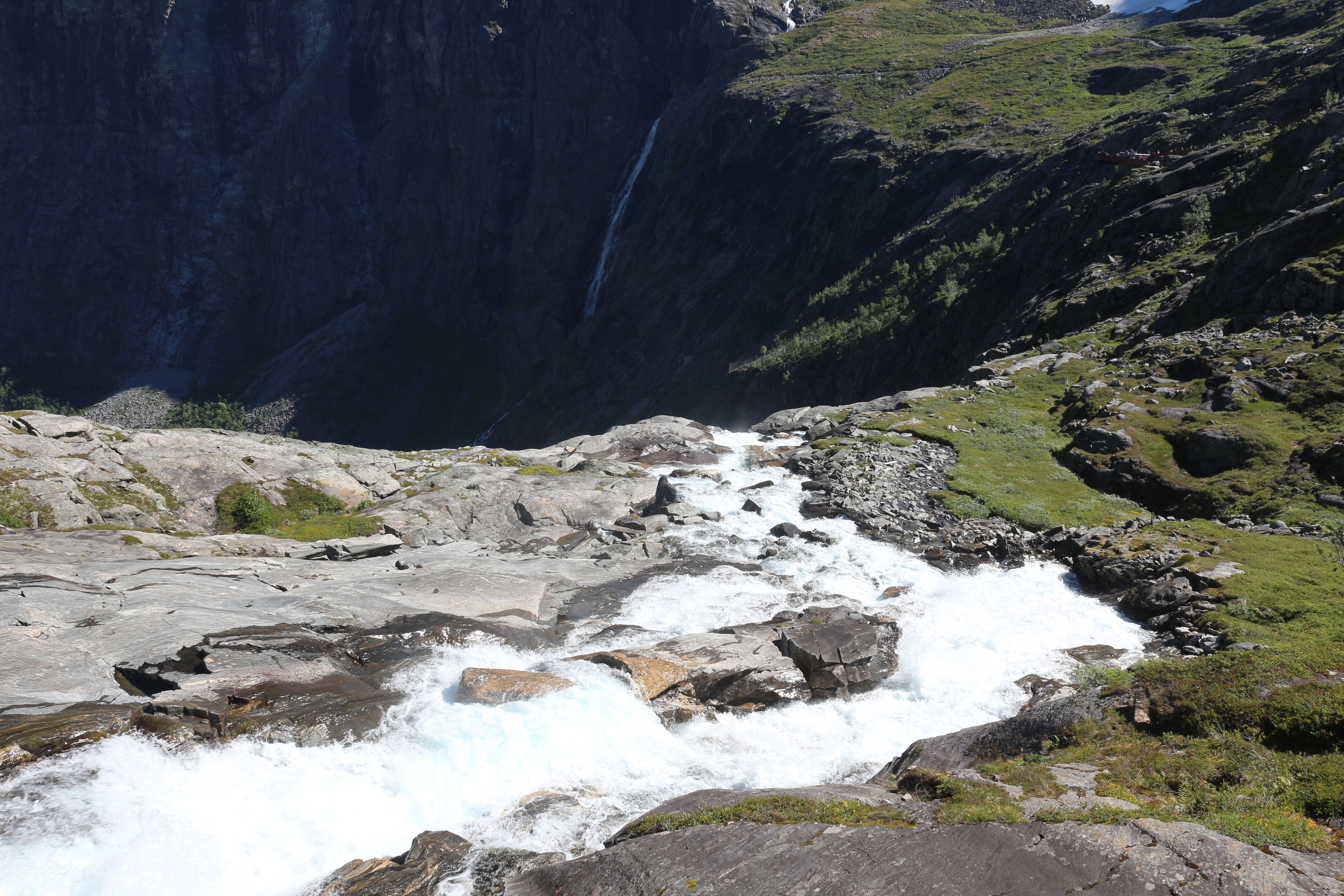
The river under the viewing platform

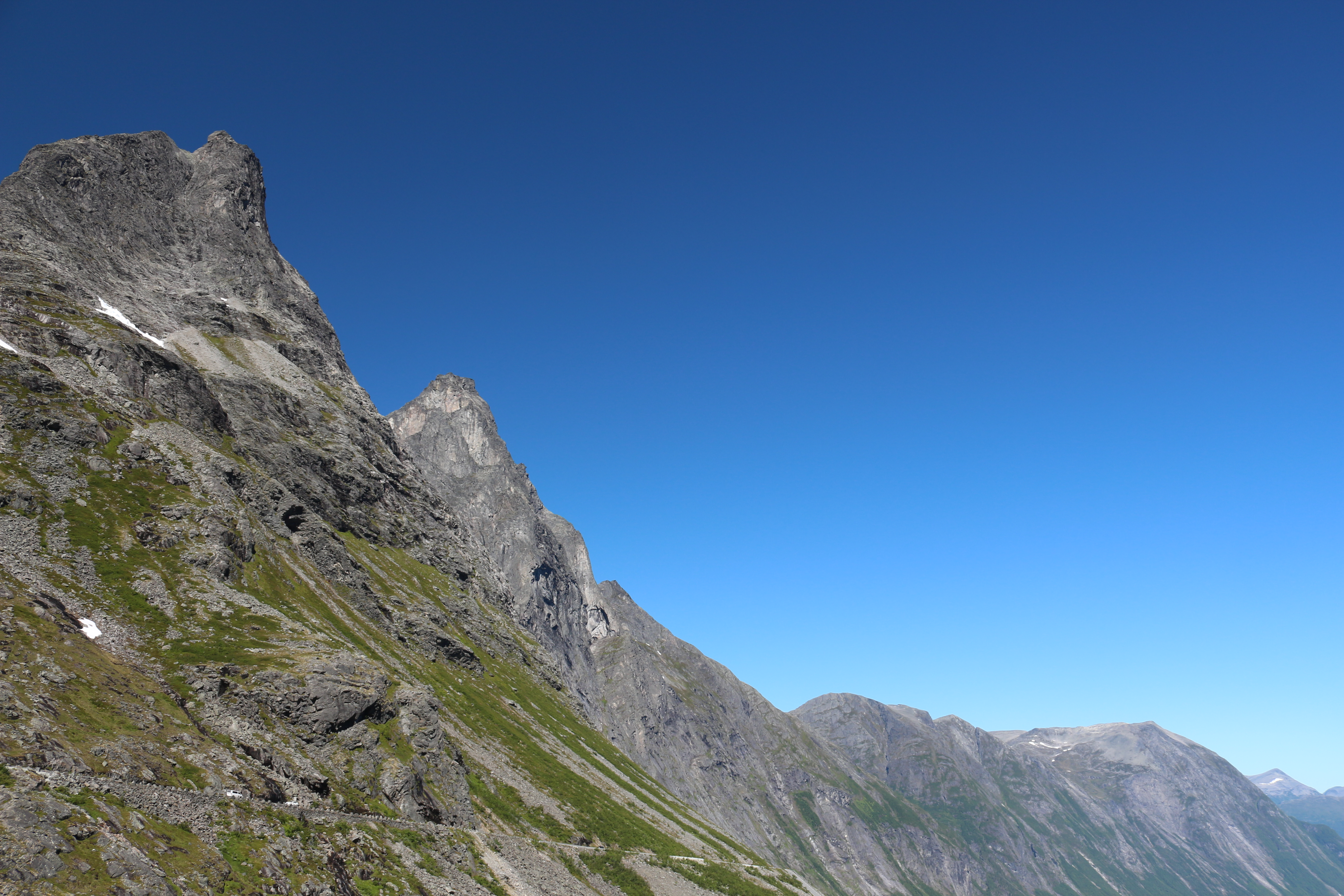

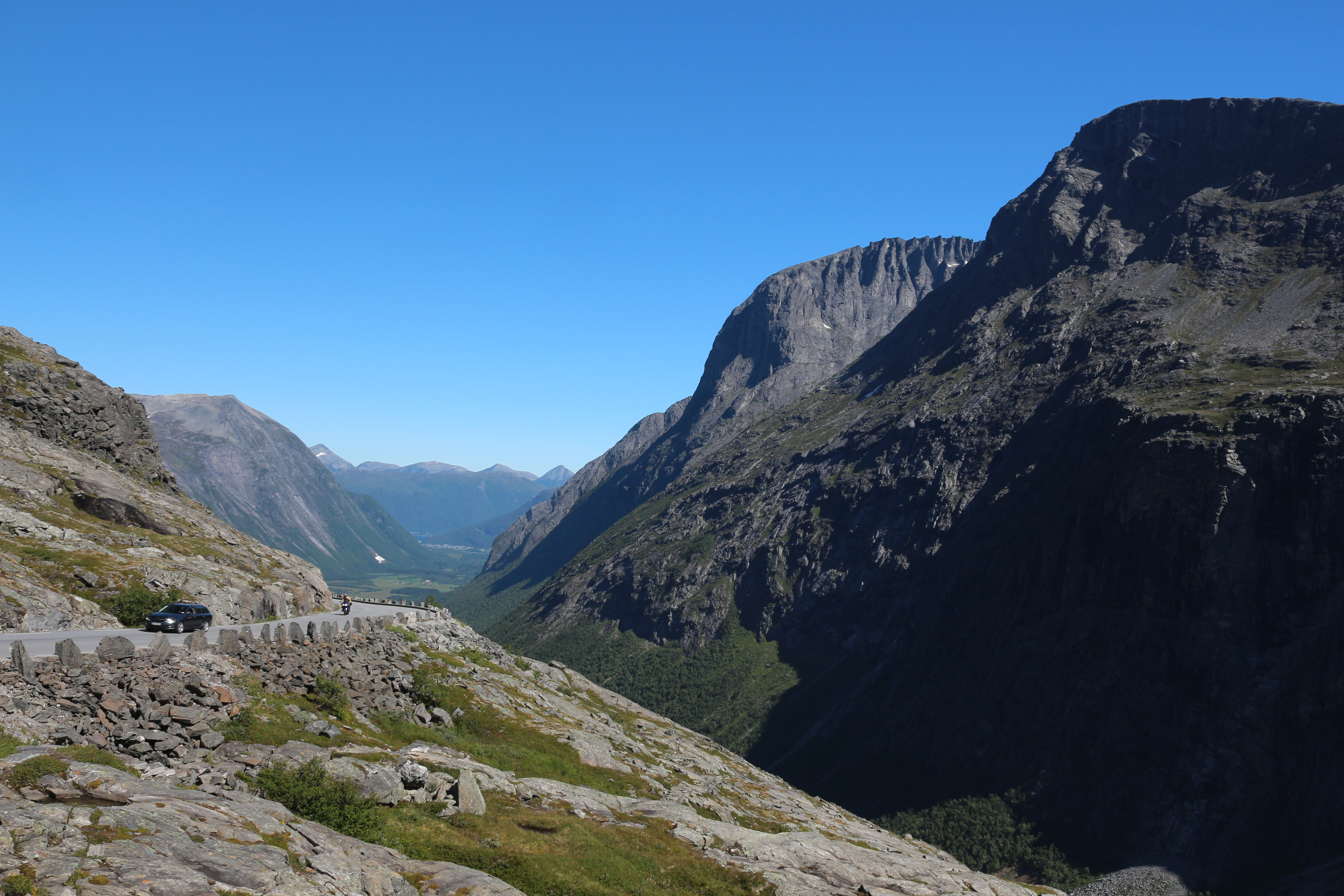
The road down seen from the viewing platform

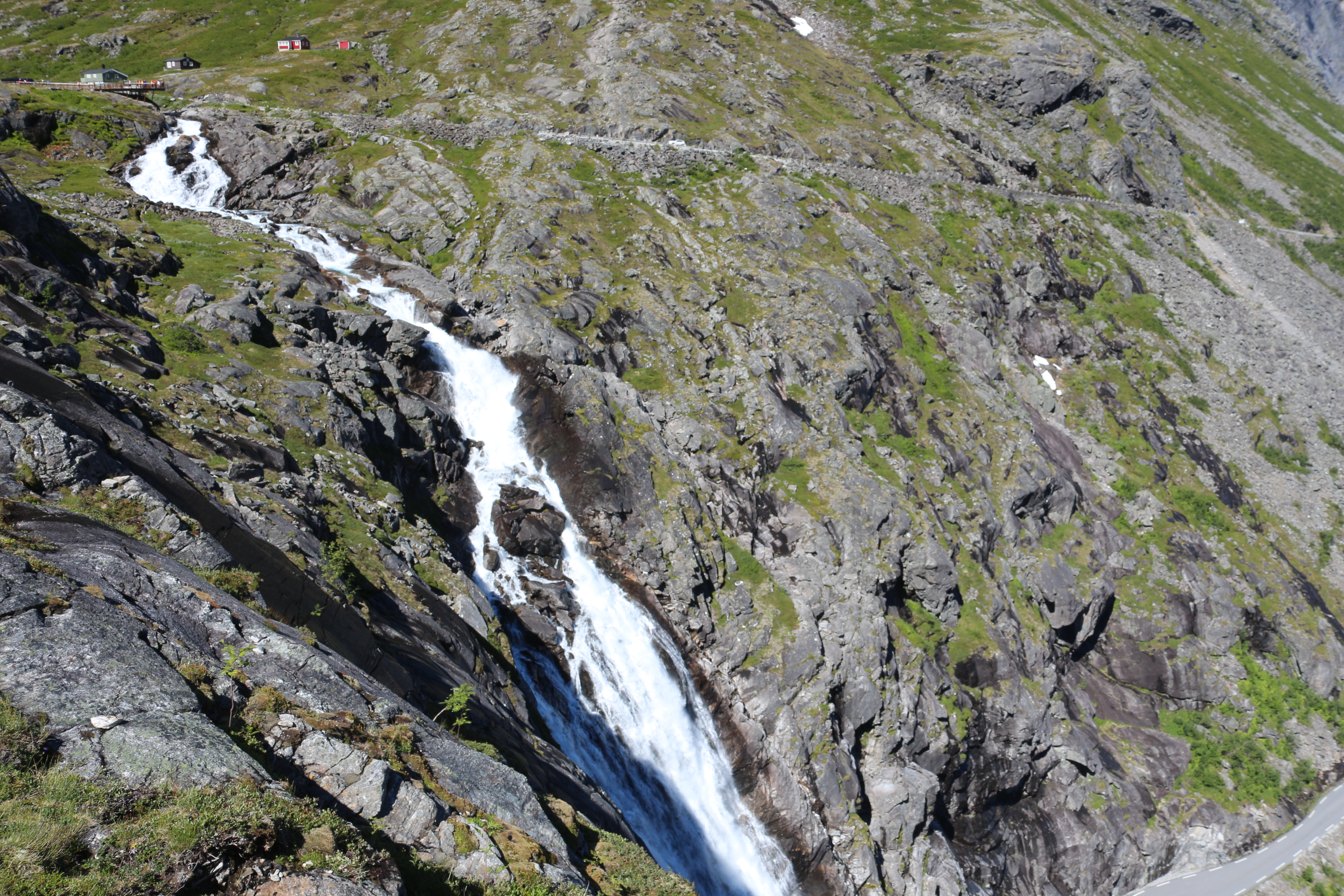
Waterfall

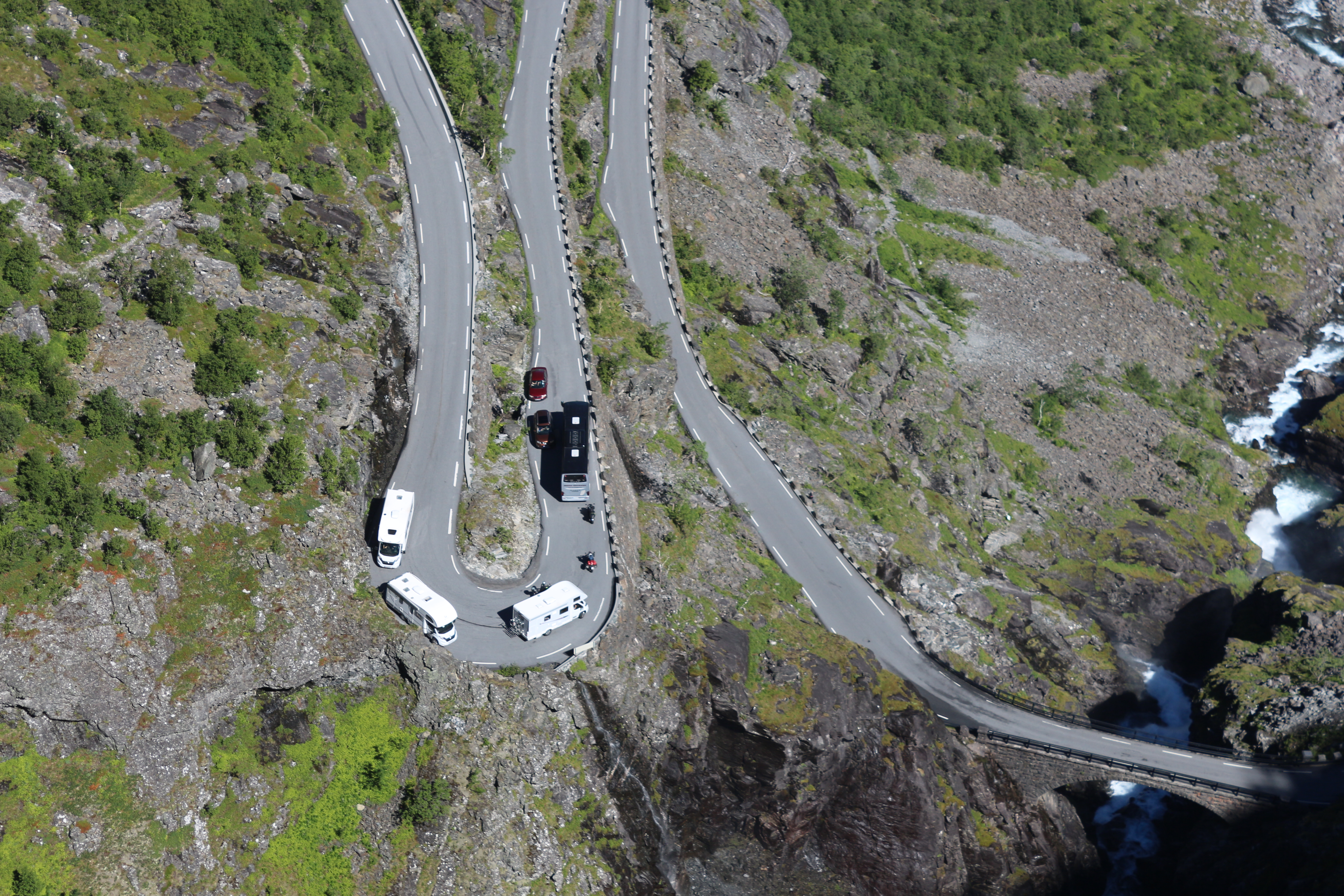
Traffic jam

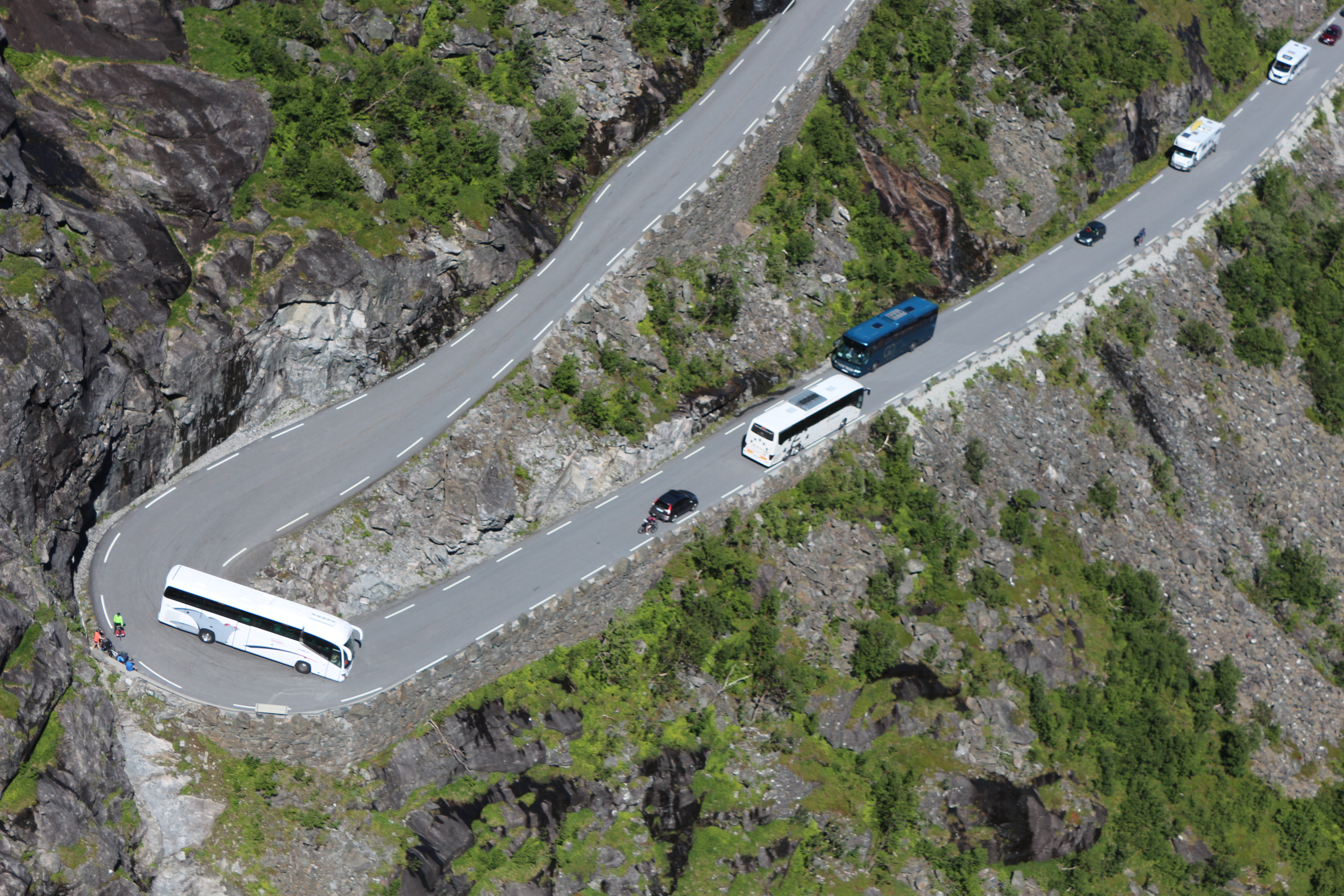
Traffic jam

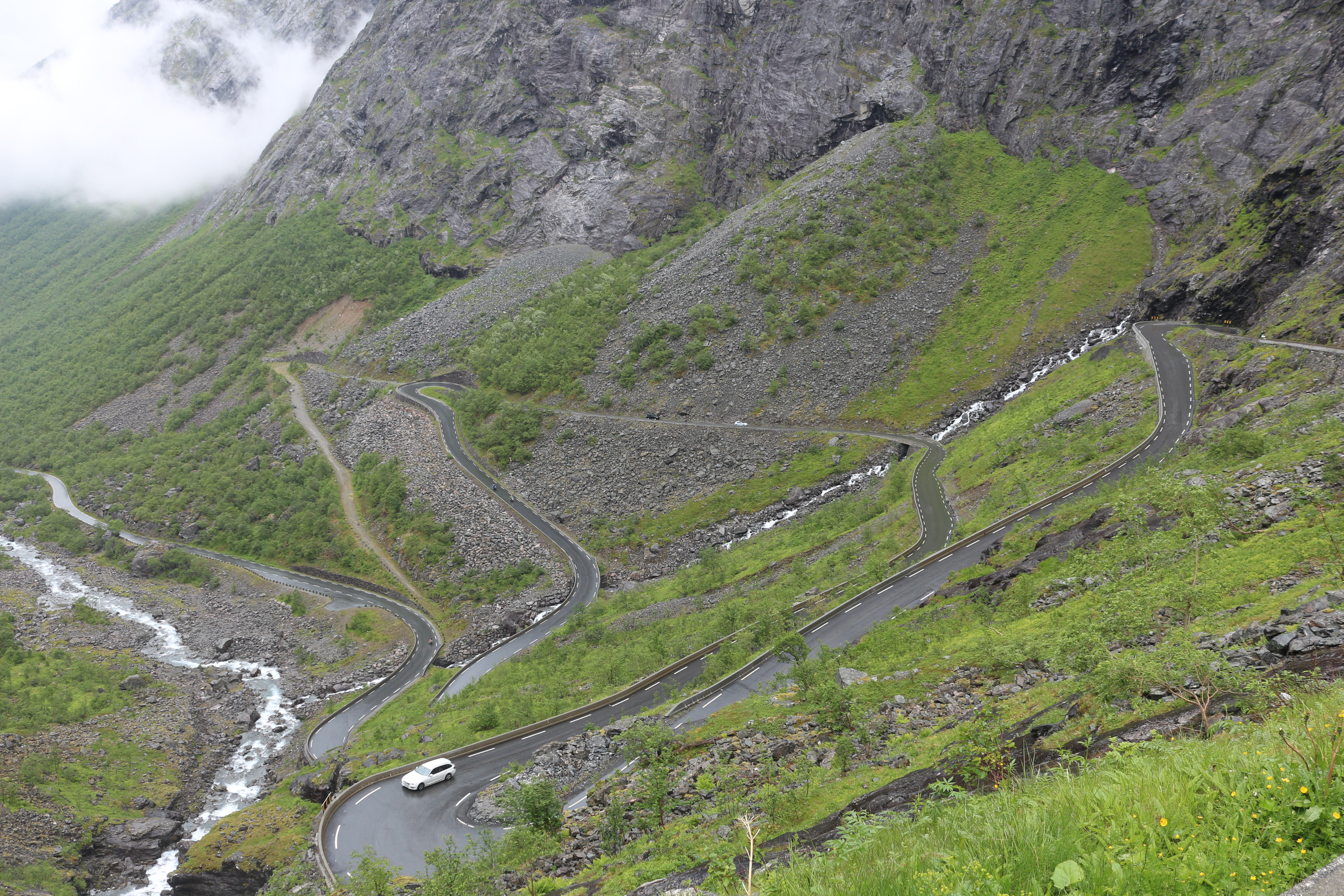
Trollstiggen

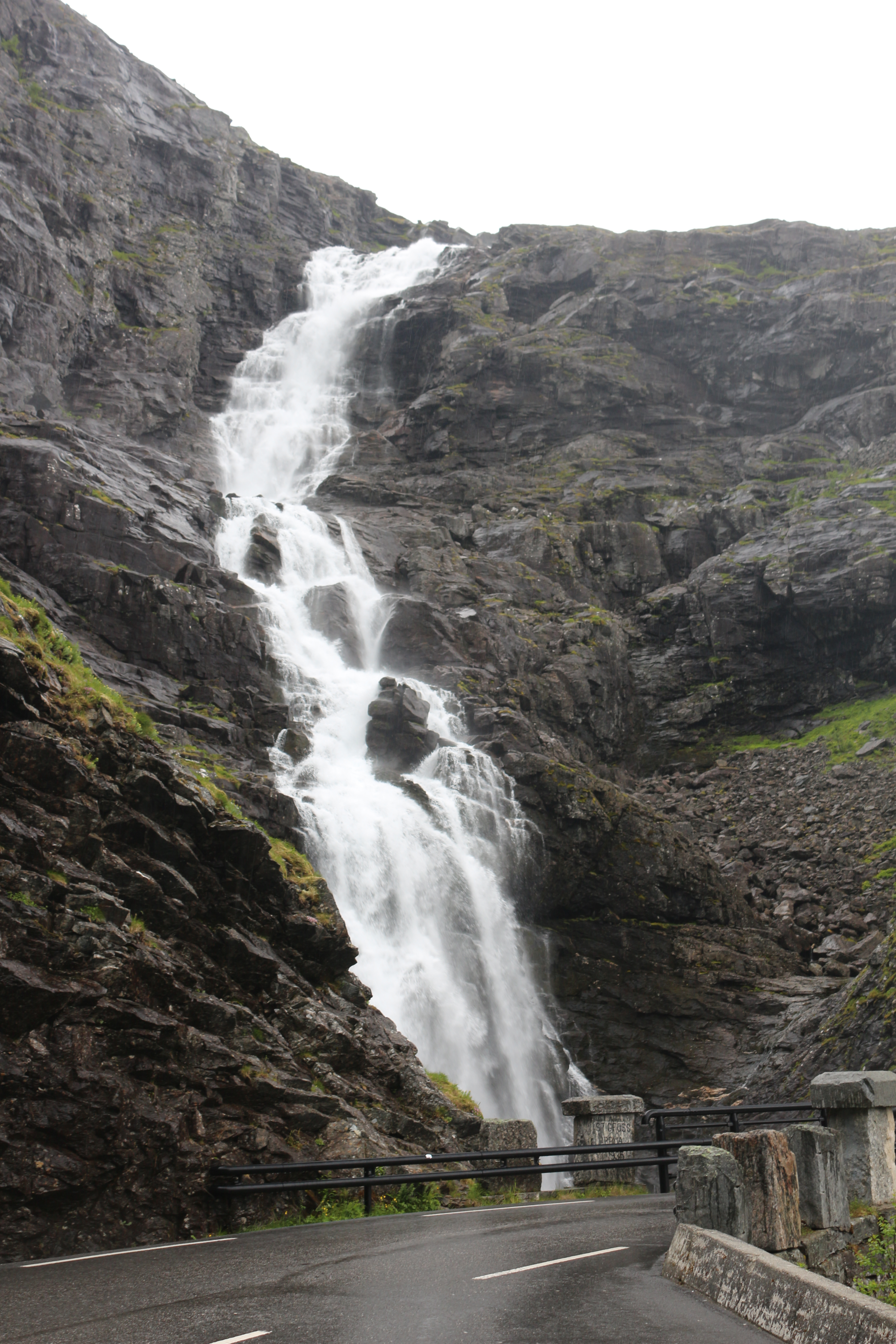
Stigfossen

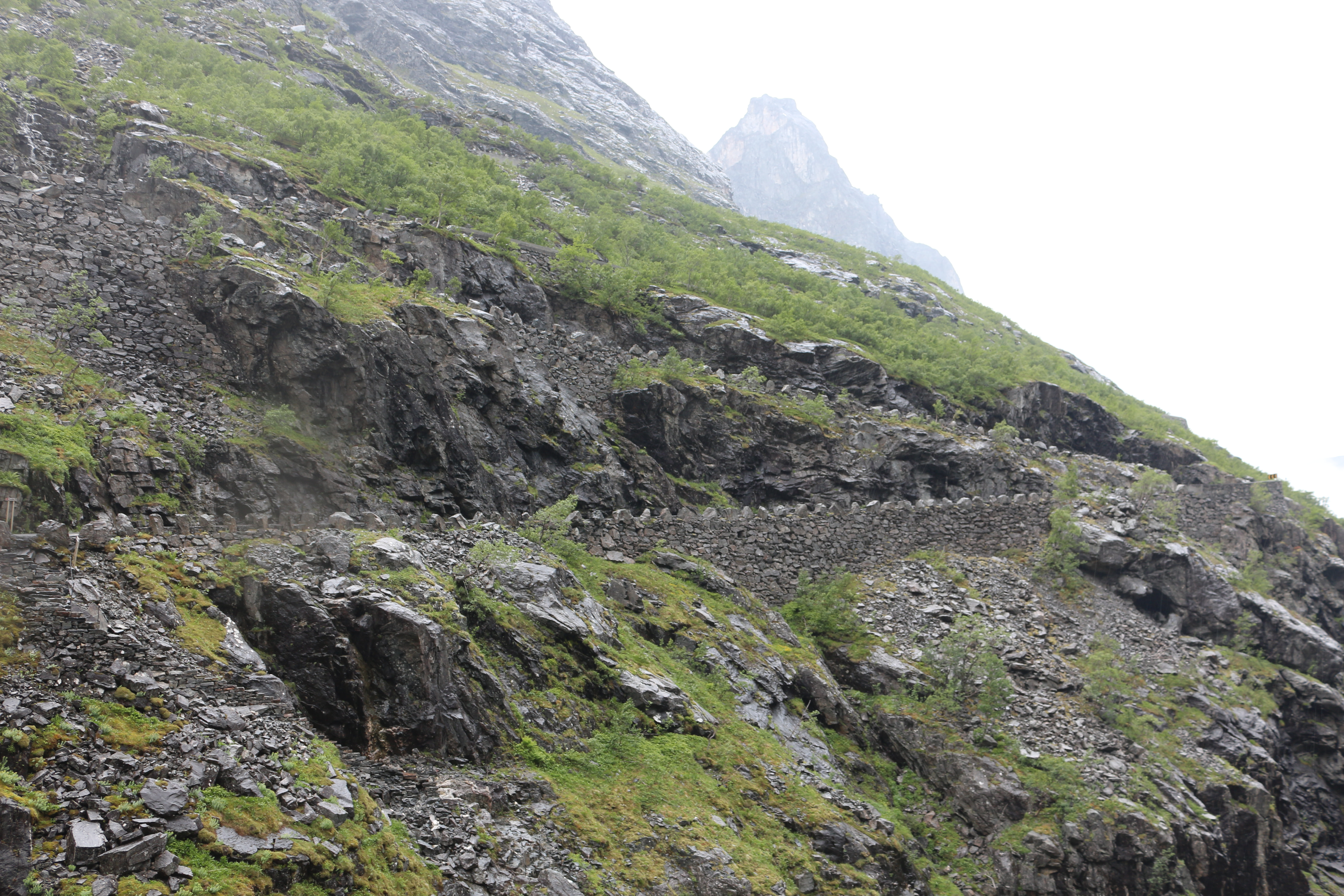
Trollstiggen

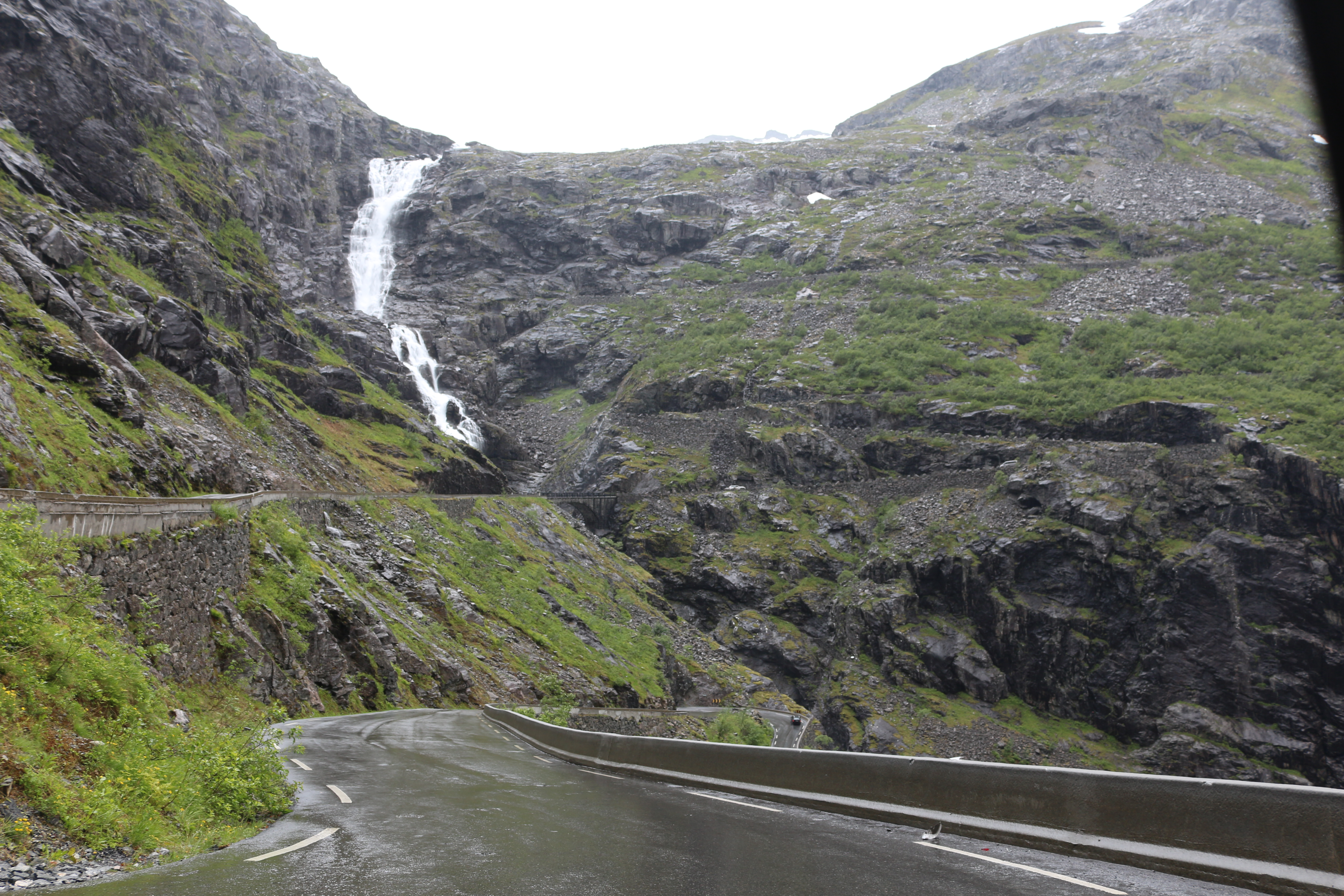
Trollstiggen near Stigfossen

== See also ==
- List of highest paved roads in Europe
- List of mountain passes
- List of waterfalls
- Stelvio Pass
- Transfăgărășan
