= Vinschgau Railway =

Railway line in South Tyrol, Italy

Overview
- Other names: Ferrovia della Val Venosta; Meran–Mals railway; Merano–Malles railway
- Native name: Vinschgaubahn
- Locale: South Tyrol, Italy
- Termini: Meran (Merano); Mals (Malles)

Service
- Route number: 250

History
- Opened: 1 July 1906

Technical
- Line length: 60.078 km (37.331 mi)
- Number of tracks: 1
- Track gauge: 1,435 mm (4 ft 8 1/2 in) standard gauge
- Minimum radius: 200 m (660 ft)
- Operating speed: 100 km/h (62 mph)
- Highest elevation: 997 m (3,271 ft)
- Maximum incline: 2.9%

The Vinschgau Railway (German: Vinschgaubahn; Italian: Ferrovia della Val Venosta) is a standard gauge, single-track railway in South Tyrol, Italy. The 60-kilometre-long (37 mi) railway runs from Meran (Italian-language placename: Merano) west to Mals (Malles) through the Vinschgau (Val Venosta), the upper valley of the river Etsch (Adige). SAD Nehverkehr conducts rail transport operations on the railway, and Südtiroler Transportstrukturen (STA) is the railway infrastructure manager.

The Vinschgau Railway was originally built and operated by the private joint-stock railway company Vinschgaubahn AG. The railway was initially planned as part of a transalpine railway over the Reschen Pass, but the northern sections were never completed. The railway from Meran to Mals opened 1 July 1906. After World War I, the Italian State Railways (Ferrovie dello Stato Italiane, FS) took over the line. The Vinschgau Railway initially closed in 1990, but the railway reopened in 2005. STA began electrifying the line in 2023, and electric service is expected to begin in 2026.

== Route ==
=== Description ===
The Vinschgau Railway begins at five-track, three-platform Meran station in the municipality of Meran, the capital of the western South Tyrol district of Burggrafenamt (Burgraviato). At the west end of the station area, where the five tracks funnel to one, the railway leaves Meran and enters Algund (Lagundo) and its eponymous side platform station. Beyond the station, the Vinschgau Railway curves from west to southeast, crosses over Strada statale 38 dello Stelvio (SS 38) near the western end of its freeway section, and crosses the Etsch into Marling (Marlengo). The railway passes through Marling station, which has two side platforms around the brief two-track section, then passes through a sweeping hairpin turn, much of which is within the spiral Kehrtunnel Marling (Galleria elicoidale Marlengo). The Vinschgau Railway continues northwest and then west. The railway returns to Algund as it passes through the long Josefsbergtunnel (Galleria Monte Giuseppe), a short tunnel, and the long Tölltunnel (Galleria Tel). Within the last tunnel, the railway enters Partschins (Parcines) and then emerges to parallel the Etsch.

The first village the Vinschgau Railway passes through in Partschins is Töll (Tel), which has an eponymous two-track station with island and side platforms and a stabling yard. The railway next serves the village of Rabland (Rablà) with a one-track, two-side-platform station. The Vinschgau Railway briefly passes through a disjoint section of Algund before passing through Plaus, whose station has a side platform. The railway then passes through Naturns (Naturno) and serves its namesake one-track, two-side-platform station and the station for the village of Staben (Stava), which has two tracks and two side platforms. Beyond Staben, the Vinschgau Railway enters the district of Vinschgau (Val Venosta) and its municipality of Kastelbell-Tschars (Castelbello-Ciardes). The double-barrel municipality has a pair of side platform stations serving its villages, first Tschars (Ciardes) and then Kastelbell (Castelbello). The Vinschgau Railway continues into Latsch (Laces), where the railroad veers away from the Etsch ahead of its eponymous two-track, two-side-platform station in the village center. The railway continues through the municipality's village of Goldrain (Coldrano) and its namesake side platform station.

The Vinschgau Railway continues west into the district capital of Schlanders (Silandro), where the railroad briefly parallels the Etsch before making a sweeping curve to the northeast and crosses the river at the village of Göflan (Govelano). Beyond the curve, the railway passes through the two-track station of the district capital, which has side and island platforms. North of downtown, the Vinschgau Railway has a hairpin turn to turn back southwest. The railway briefly parallels the river through the center of Laas (Lasa), whose station has two tracks and two side platforms. The Vinschgau Railway serves the western Laas village of Eyrs (Oris) with a single-platform station, then rejoins the Etsch on its way to Spondinig–Pads–Stilfs (Spondigna–Prato–Stelvio), a two-track, two-side-platform station in the village of Spondinig (Spondigna) in the municipality of Prad am Stilfser Joch (Prato allo Stelvio). The railway leaves the river vicinity for the last time as it heads northwest through Schluderns (Sluderno) and its one-side-platform Schluderns–Glurns (Sluderno-Glorenza) station. The Vinschgau Railway passes through several curves in the southern part of Mals (Malles Venosta) before reaching its terminus at the Mals (Malles) station, which has two tracks, two platforms, and a stabling yard.

=== Map ===
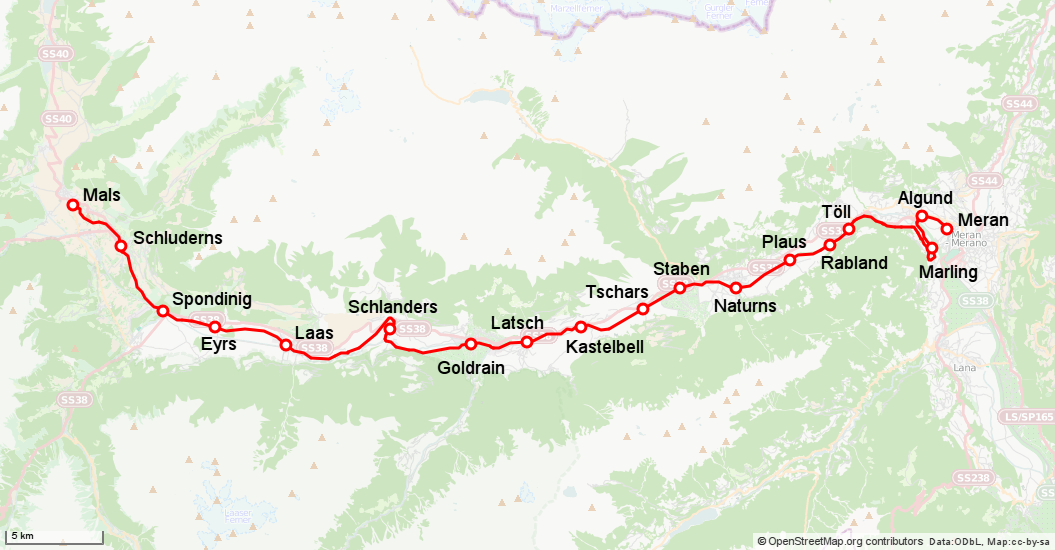
Map of the Vinschgau Railway with stations

=== Diagram ===
Source: Italian railway atlas

== History ==
=== Route planning, construction, and commissioning ===
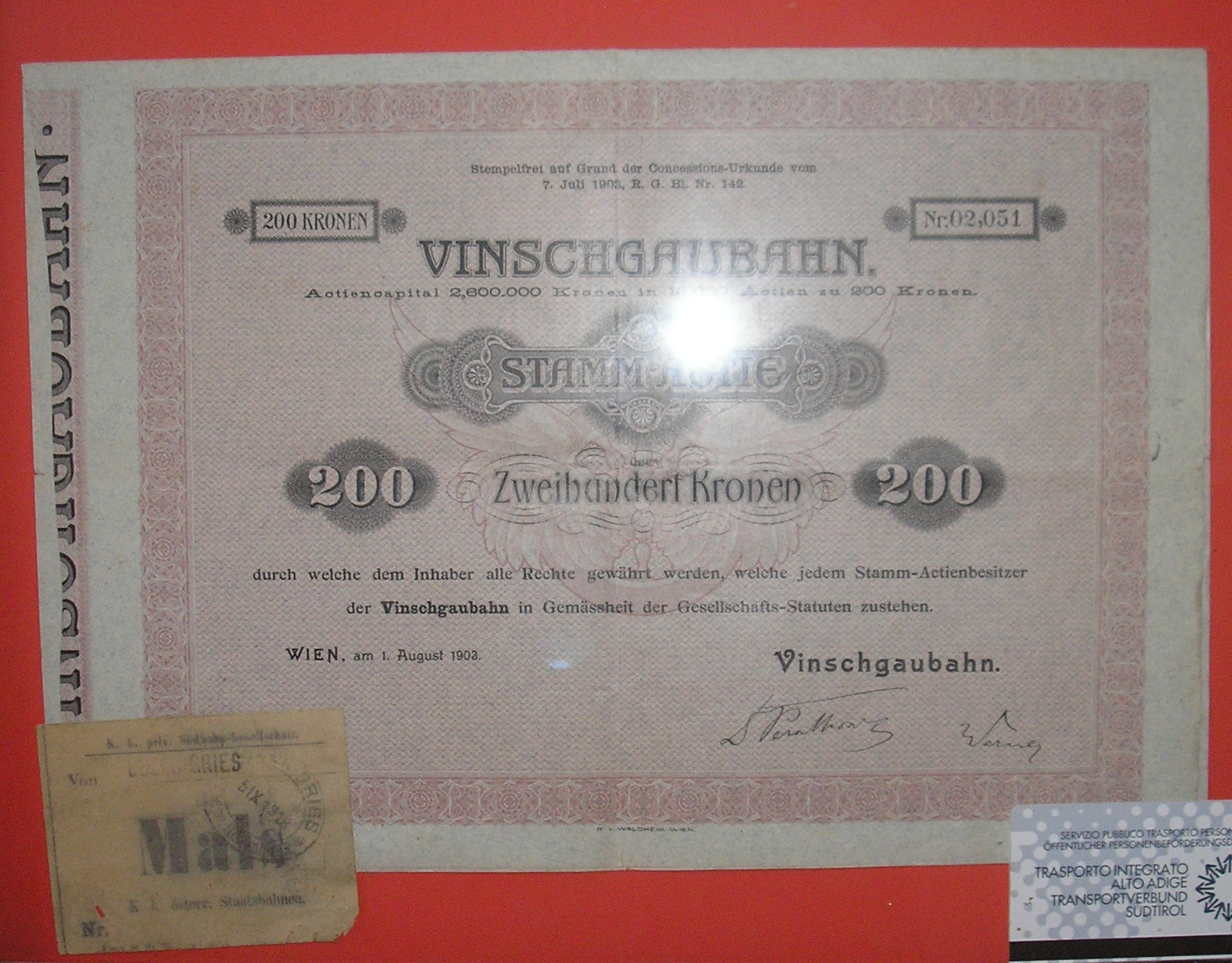
Share certificate of the Vinschgau Railway from 1903

The Vinschgau Railway was granted a concession 7 July 1903, as a state-guaranteed, standard-gauge Austrian private local railway. The area was part of Austria-Hungary until after World War I. The construction management of the line, which connected to the Bozen (Bolzano)–Meran railway line (in operation since 1881) at Meran and continued its kilometer numbering, was entrusted to Konstantin Ritter von Chabert. On 1 July 1906, the Vinschgau Railway was inaugurated simultaneously with the new Meran train station. Operation was handled by the Imperial Royal Austrian State Railways (kkStB). Originally, the railway line was planned to continue as the Reschenscheideck Railway (Reschen Watershed Railway), crossing the Reschen Pass into the valley of the Inn and continuing to the Landeck railway station on the Arlberg railway. However, it was already recognized at the time that a profitable freight transport operation would never have been feasible, as the tariff distances from Bozen to Landeck were exactly the same as those of the Brenner Railway. Thus, no advantage would have been gained, since the distances and therefore the costs would have been identical, and no competition would have arisen. The only benefit would have been a closer connection between the spa town of Meran and Landeck. However, as of 1917, the military also had an interest in a Landeck–Pfunds–Mals connection as a military railway. The division of Tyrol after World War I prevented the realization of this project, although some construction work had already been carried out in the Landeck area (such as the construction of a tunnel). A connection with the Rhaetian Railway was planned with the Ofenberg Railway project in Mals and with an extension of the Lower Engadine line, opened in 1913, from the Scuol-Tarasp railway station via Martina to Nauders or Pfunds. During World War I, this connection would have gained greater importance, as Tyrol was only accessible via the Brenner Railway. Construction work on this project only began in the spring of 1918, but by the end of the war, only parts of the substructure had been completed.

=== Traffic decline ===
After Austria-Hungary's defeat in World War I, South Tyrol was occupied by Italy in November 1918 and annexed in 1920 under the Treaty of Saint-Germain-en-Laye. Consequently, the railway line was taken over by the Italian State Railways (Ferrovie dello Stato Italiane, FS) from 1918 onwards. During the next 60 years, the FS invested very little in the railway's infrastructure, although a five-track turntable was built in Mals, specifically for turning steam locomotives with tenders. Rumors of closure surfaced repeatedly, and the topic had been under discussion since 1961. Nevertheless, in 1985, tunnel reinforcements and track renovations were carried out on individual sections, for example, between Tschars (Ciardes) and Kastelbell (Castelbello). On the other hand, much of the original equipment from 1905 was still in use on large parts of the line. The electrification of the Bozen–Meran line in 1934 made the Vinschgau Railway an expensive, isolated operation. Freight traffic had played virtually no role since the Vinschgau fruit cooperatives decided to switch their fruit transport to road. The railway was incurring increasingly high operating deficits. The FS were determined to streamline their operations and dismantle unprofitable infrastructure, particularly in peripheral areas. In 1987, the Val Venosta Railway was classified as a "dead branch" (Italian: ramo secco) and slated for complete closure.

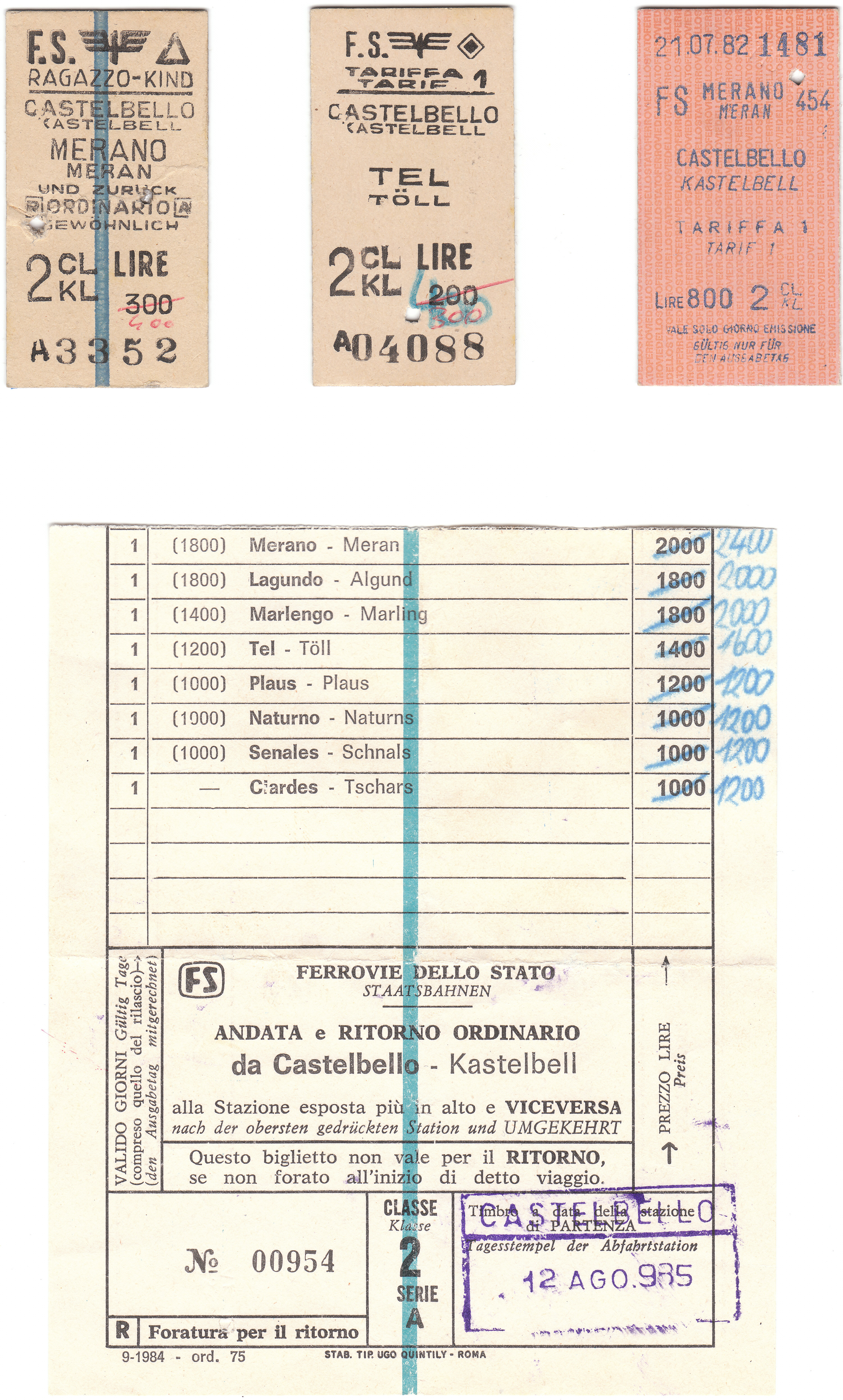
Train tickets for the Vinschgau Railway during the FS (Italian State Railways) era. From left to right: 1977, 1980, 1982 and 1985.

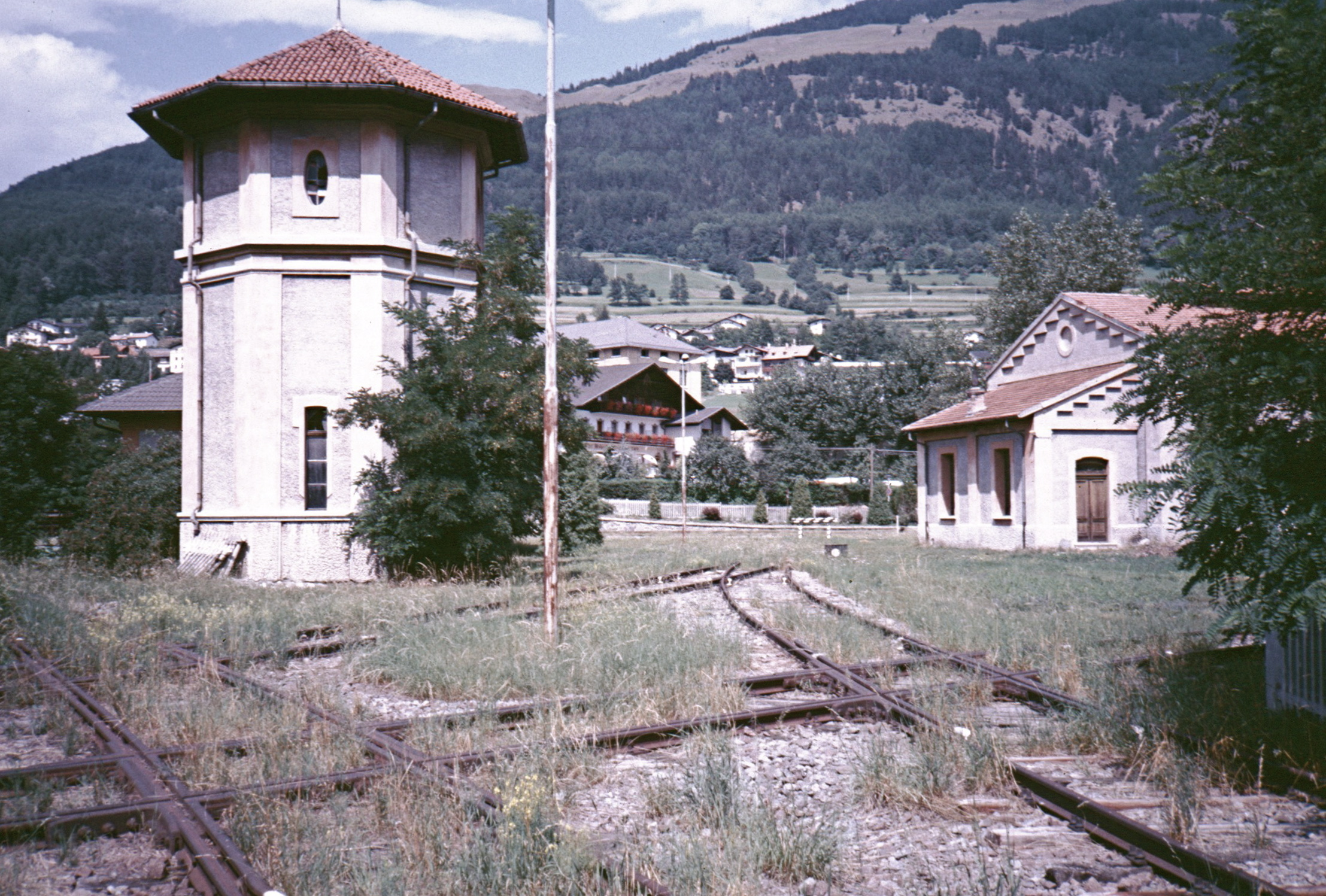
West end in Mals, 1986

This period was characterized by a lack of interest in the line on the part of the FS. In the late 1980s, during the summer months (a period of high tourist traffic), the train service was replaced by buses specially rented from Lombardy. The reasons given for this were granting holidays to staff and carrying out tunnel maintenance work. In its final years under state ownership, the timetable consisted of only three train pairs on weekdays. The last scheduled train ran on 9 June 1990.

Passenger transport was taken over by regional buses of the South Tyrolean bus company Südtiroler Autobus Dienst AG (Società Automobilistica Dolomiti, SAD). However, the dissatisfaction of the local population, as well as of tourists, with the increase in road traffic in the Vinschgau meant that the calls for a reopening of the railway line never completely ceased.

=== Renovation ===
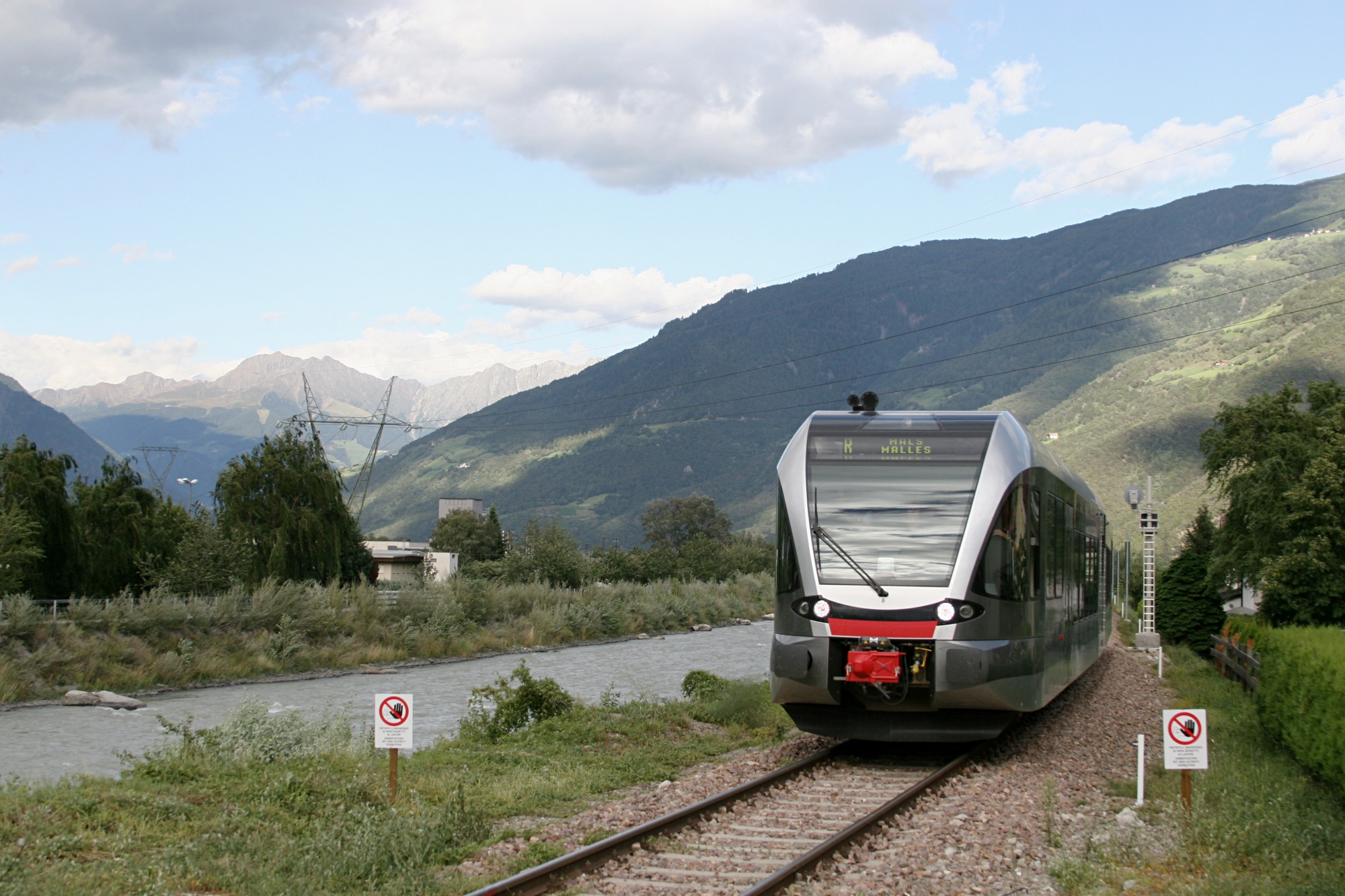
On the banks of the Etsch near Naturns (2005)

In 1999, the railway line became the property of the South Tyrol region, and from 2000 to 2004, it was comprehensively renovated under the management of STA on behalf of the government of South Tyrol. Although the track superstructure had to be completely renewed along its entire length, it proved advantageous that the track infrastructure had not been dismantled in the preceding years. On the one hand, no land had yet been repurposed for other uses, such as road construction, and on the other hand, the railway had never completely faded from public awareness. Furthermore, the historical station and halt buildings were faithfully restored and, where necessary, supplemented with new structures in a uniform, modern design. The turntable at Mals station, which had allowed for the turning of locomotives, such as those with tenders, was preserved but not renovated. Bike rental stations were established at several stations along the line. After the completion of the construction work, scheduled train services resumed on 5 May 2005.

The initial forecasts for passenger numbers were far exceeded after only a short time. During peak hours and the tourist season, the railway soon reached its capacity limit.

With the timetable change in December 2012, the Töll Brücke (Tel Ponte) stop was closed and the old Töll (Tel) station was reopened. The old station until then had only served as a passing loop. The track closure necessary for the required construction work was also used to lower the track bed of the Töll tunnel, making it suitable for electrification. In addition, two sidings for maintenance vehicles were built about 225 metres (738 ft) southwest of Töll station.

==== 2010 mudslide ====
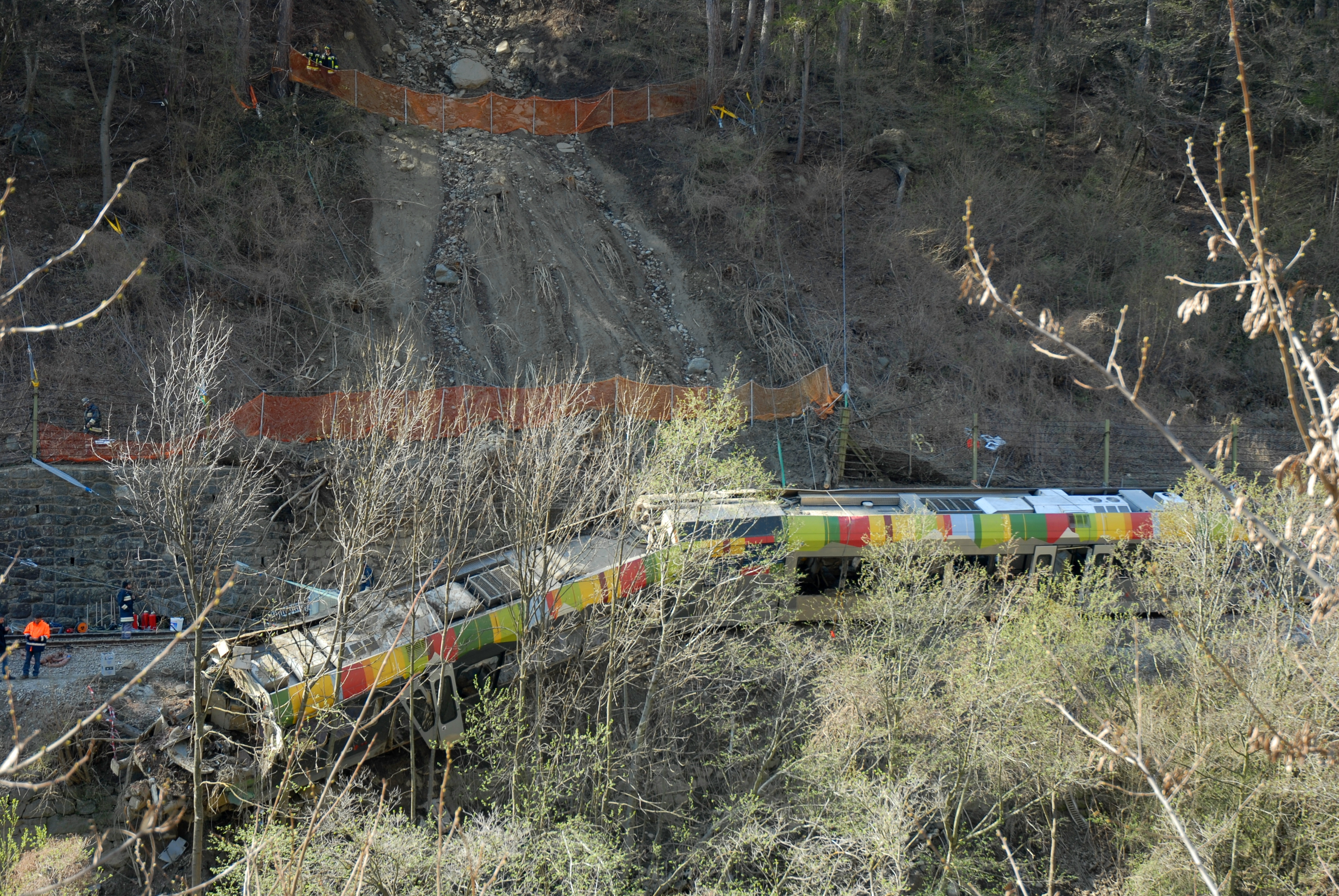
Accident caused by the 12 April 2010 mudslide

On 12 April 2010, a serious accident occurred on the railway line between Latsch (Laces) and Kastelbell, in a gorge known as the Latschander. At 09:02, a mudslide approximately 15 metres (49 ft) wide and 30 metres (98 ft) high struck regional train R108, which was traveling from Mals toward Meran. The mass of mud and debris tore the front section of the articulated railcar ATR 100-007 from the tracks, causing the entire train to derail. Only a few trees on the riverbank prevented the railcar from plunging into the Etsch. A train traveling in the opposite direction had passed the same spot without incident just a few minutes earlier. The accident was triggered by a defective valve in the irrigation system of an orchard above the accident site. This allowed large quantities of water to seep into the hillside, ultimately causing the landslide. Nine people were killed in the accident; all 28 other people on board were injured, seven of them seriously. This was the most serious railway accident in the history of South Tyrol. Regular train service resumed on 2 June 2010. A memorial stone on the opposite bank of the Etsch between Kastelbell and Latsch commemorates the tragedy.

=== Electrification ===
In April 2014, the South Tyrolean regional councilor Florian Mussner stated that with approximately 2 million passengers annually, the capacity limits of the diesel train sets had been reached, particularly during peak hours and the tourist season, and therefore classified the electrification of the Vinschgau Railway as a priority. The South Tyrolean regional government consequently decided on 16 December 2014, to electrify the railway line in the following years. Electrification will increase capacity to up to 276 seats per train, allow for a continuous half-hourly service, and enable efficient through-running of trains between Mals and Bozen. The chosen traction power system is 25 kilovolts alternating current with a frequency of 50 Hertz, which is why the Stadler FLIRT trains already operating on other lines in South Tyrol were technically upgraded accordingly for future operation. In addition, it was decided to install European Train Control System (ETCS) Level 2 as the train control system and Global System for Mobile Communications – Railway (GSM-R) as the data and communication system.

As part of the work that began in 2016, which necessitated temporary line closures, all stations that were not yet adequately equipped initially received extended platforms and, where necessary, underpasses. In 2018, the Marling (Marlengo) reversing tunnel was lowered. In 2019, the line was straightened between Laas (Lasa) and Schlanders (Silandro), and the Staben stop in Naturns (Naturno) was closed. The old Schnalstal station in Schnals (Senales), which had most recently only been used as a passing loop, was reopened in its place under the new name Staben station. Also in 2019, major reconstruction work began at the Mals terminus, which included adjustments to the platforms, the depot, and the Tartsch (Tarces) siding. The construction at Mals was completed in 2020. From November 2021 to the beginning of October 2023, the tunnel profile was widened in the Josefsberg (Monte Giuseppe) and Töll tunnels to increase safety in the event of an evacuation, and a pedestrian walkway with a handrail was installed in each. During this time, the Y-shaped steel sleepers were replaced with concrete sleepers on the Meran–Töll section. In June 2023, the installation of the masts for the overhead line began.

On February 16, 2025, a final closure of the Laas–Mals section began, lasting more than a year. According to plans, this was supplemented by a closure of the Meran–Laas section from 26 October 2025 to the end of March 2026, serving for the final construction work, technical installations, and a testing phase.

== Operation ==
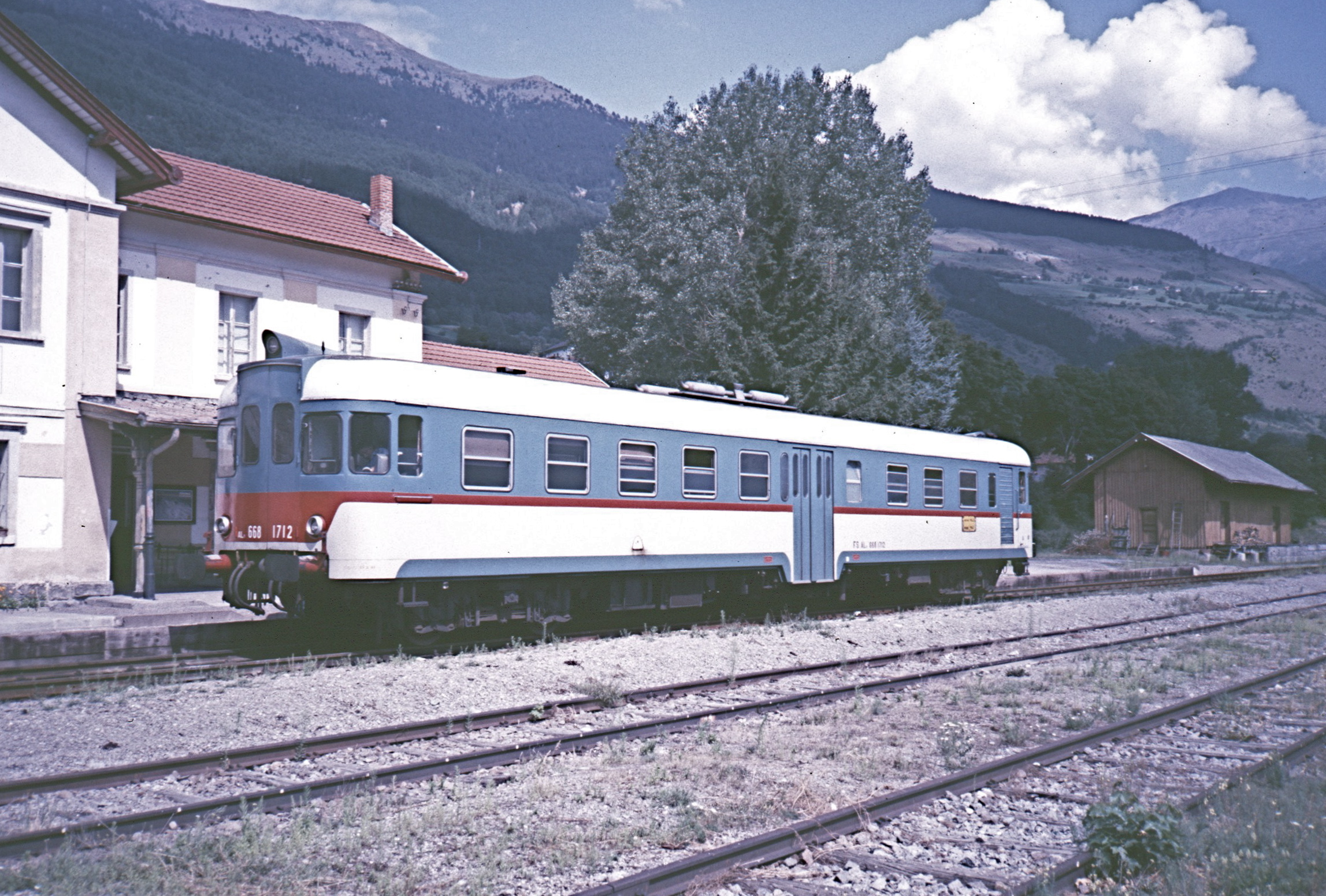
Mals train station with a diesel railcar of the FS Class ALn 668 series, 1986

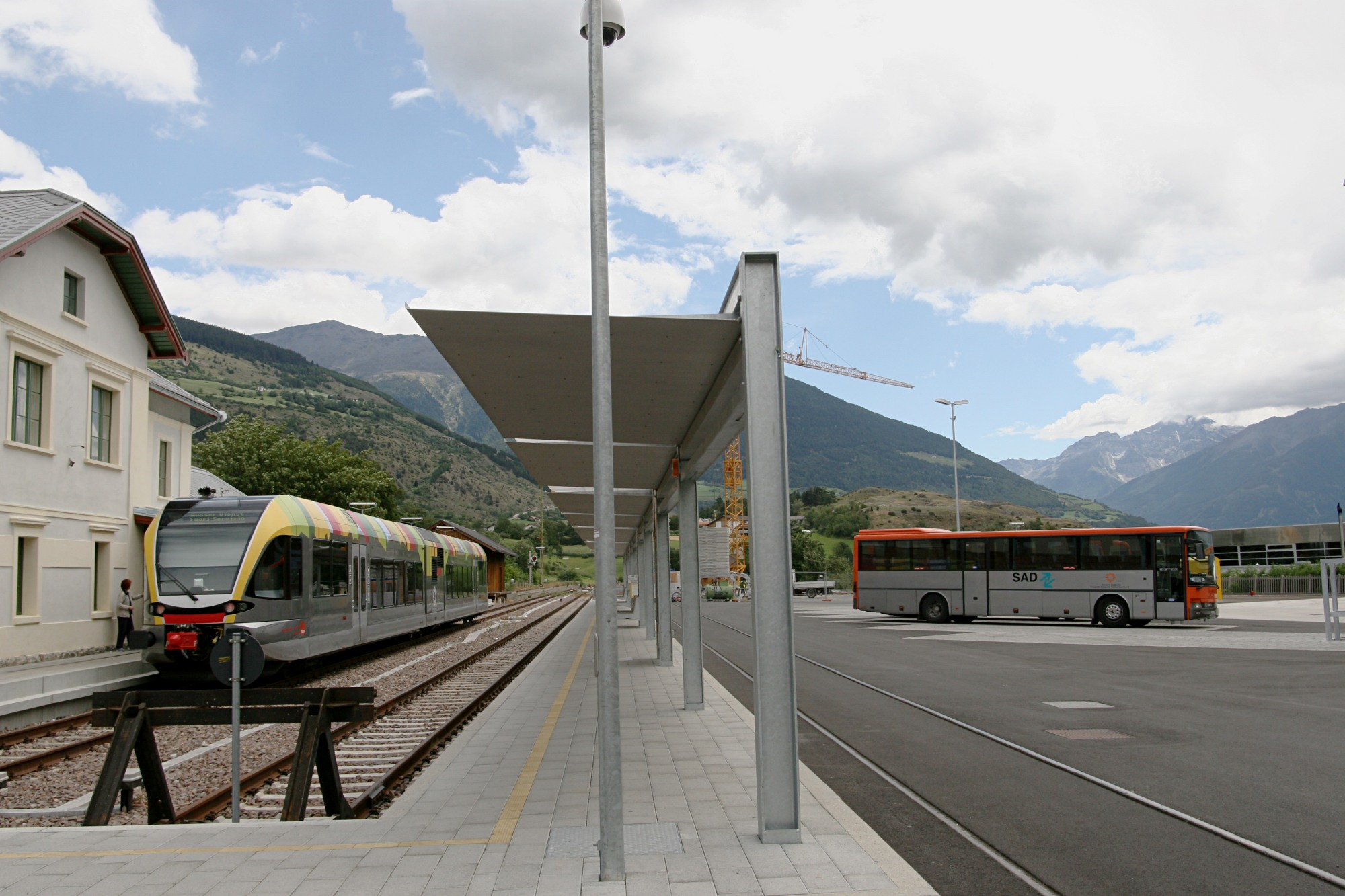
Mals train station was designed as an interchange hub for regional bus lines.

From 1906 to 1919, after World War I, the line was operated by the former kkStB, and subsequently, until 1990, by the FS. Because the line was not electrified, unlike the Bozen–Meran railway, FS Class ALn 772 railcars (Littorina) were frequently used on this route during the first half of the 20th century.

Following extensive renovations in the early 2000s, eight low-floor Diesel multiple units of the Stadler GTW type were put into service starting in 2005. The operating concept was developed by the engineering firm Willi Hüsler from Zurich. The reintroduction of rail freight transport is not planned for the time being.

From its opening, the train service operated on an hourly schedule, with bus timetables in the Vinschgau valley initially remaining unchanged. During this phase, which was designated as a trial period, the aim was to gain operational experience and identify any potential for improvement. Since the autumn of 2005, express trains have also been running, stopping only at the larger towns between Meran and Kastelbell. This provides a half-hourly service during peak hours. With the timetable change in December 2012, all express train services were initially cancelled on Sundays and public holidays. These trains have since been reinstated, but during the less busy winter months, they only run on weekdays. In mid-December 2006, some trains were extended to Bozen for the first time, which was a great advantage, particularly for commuters. However, with the 2010/2011 timetable, they once again terminated in Meran.

Especially during the summer months, the trains are often overcrowded. The capacity for transporting bicycles on the trains, which is in high demand, is often insufficient, meaning that cyclists are sometimes unable to board at intermediate stations. A combined train and bicycle ticket, which was available before 2014 as the "Eventcard," was planned to be available again from April 2014 in a modified form under the name "bikemobil Card." This is a combined ticket for the use of buses, trains, and rental bicycles, valid for the first time throughout South Tyrol and as far as Tschierv in the Val Müstair of Switzerland. It is available as a day ticket, a 3-day ticket, and a 7-day ticket. However, unlike with the previous "Eventcard," the (rental) bicycle may not be transported on buses or trains. In addition, a bicycle transport service by truck is organized six times a day from May to October.

== Rolling stock ==
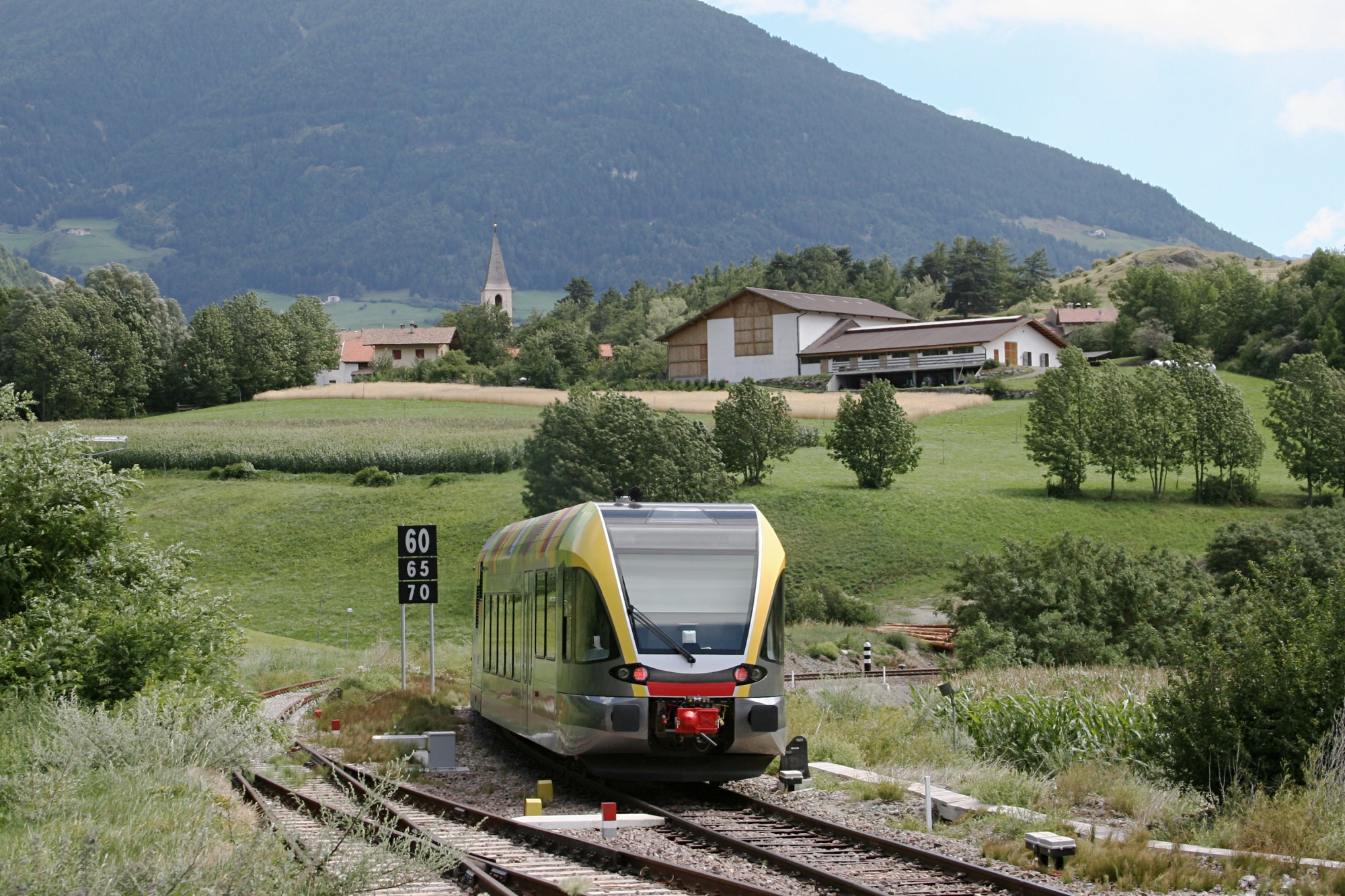
A railcar is leaving Mals in the direction of Meran.

Twelve Stadler GTW 3rd generation 2/6 diesel-electric railcars, designated ATR 100-001 to 012, with the individual units designated ATR 101, 102, and 103. The railcar ATR 100-007, which had been involved in the April 2010 mudslide, has been decommissioned. It was stored for a long time at Schnalstal station and has since been moved to the Meran station premises. On 26 April and 16 May 2013, the central power units of railcars ATR 100-005 and ATR 100-006 caught fire and had to be extinguished by the local volunteer fire departments. Both trains were out of service for several months. This resulted in a temporary shortage of three units, meaning that some services could not be operated in double traction as planned.

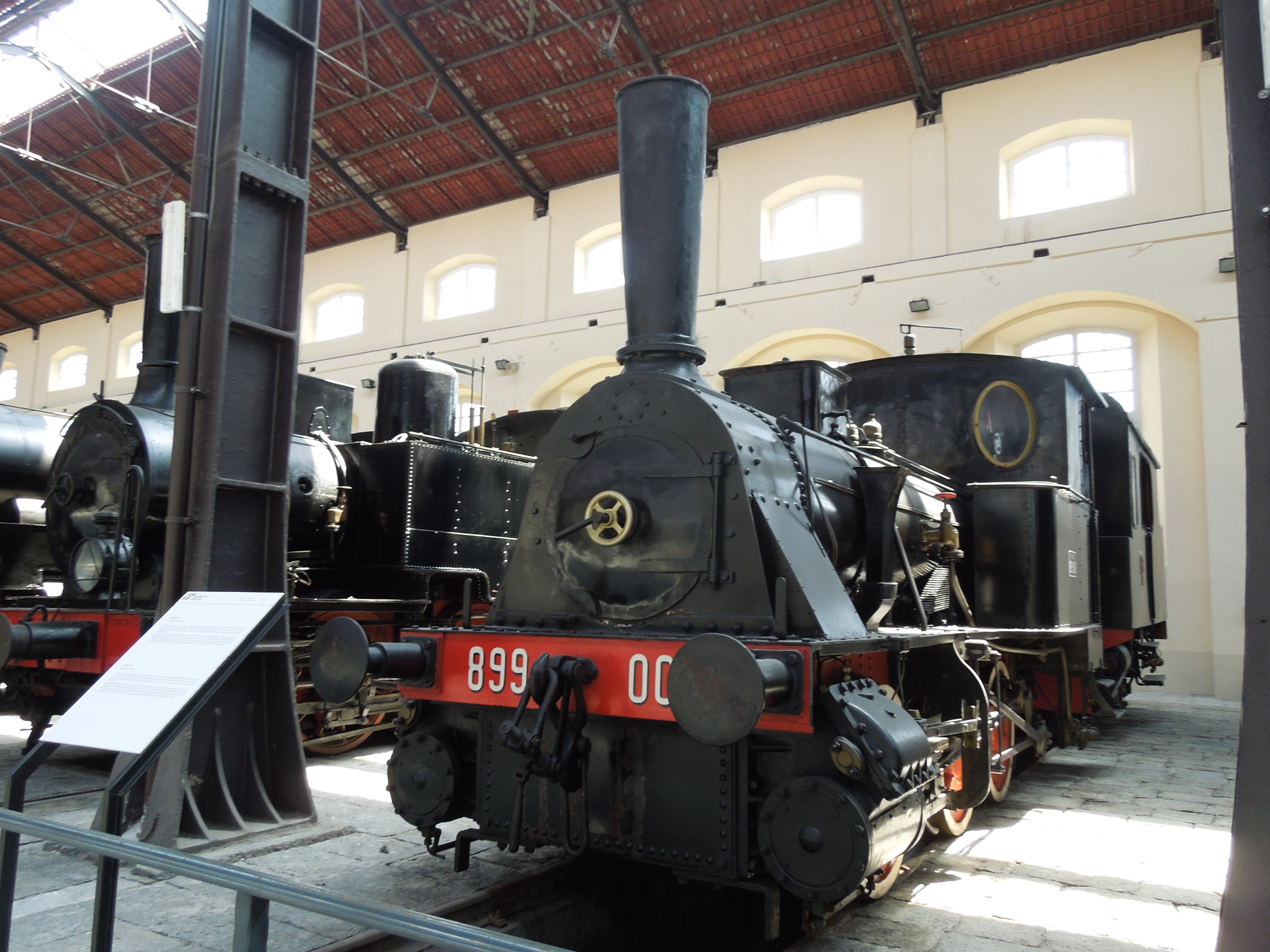
The last surviving original locomotive of the Vinschgau Railway in the National Railway Museum of Pietrarsa.

The last surviving steam locomotive of this railway line, FS 899.006 (formerly kkStB 294.09, originally Bozen–Meran Railway 2 MERAN), built in 1882, was on display as a monument in Turin for some time, but is now located in the National Railway Museum of Pietrarsa in San Giorgio a Cremano near Naples and has been accessible to the public again since December 2007.

== Future plans ==
In 2010, three studies were commissioned as part of a European Union (EU)–funded Interreg project to examine the feasibility of connecting the Vinschgau region with the Swiss canton of Graubünden by rail. The possibility of extending the Vinschgau Railway from Mals to the Rhaetian Railway in the Lower Engadine was considered, a route that had previously been planned with the Ofenberg Railway. The project aimed to close a gap in the European railway network and better connect two important economic and cultural regions: the Swiss Plateau with Northern Italy, and Graubünden with South Tyrol. At a conference in 2013, the studies presented various possible routes; the necessary investment sums were estimated at €1 billion, depending on the chosen route. A potential connection to the Swiss railway network enjoys broad support in South Tyrolean regional politics; in 2015, Governor Arno Kompatscher explored possibilities for co-financing by the EU with European Commission President Jean-Claude Juncker.

A new edition of the never-realized Reschen Railway to Austrian North Tyrol was also discussed, specifically as a connection to Landeck and the Arlberg Railway. In 2015, the South Tyrolean regional parliament unanimously called upon the regional government to "contact the state of Tyrol and the canton of Graubünden to explore the possibilities of implementing the railway connection from Mals to Landeck."

Another project under discussion is a new version of the never-realized Ortler Railway, with a route passing under the Stelvio Pass to Bormio in Lombardy and possibly continuing to the Alta Valtellina Railway. On 4 December 2017, a preliminary study (including geological, hydrological, geomorphological, and seismic assessments) for a connection to Bormio was presented in Mals. Depending on the chosen route, the planned line would be 33 to 35 kilometres (21 to 22 mi) long, with 18 to 33 kilometres (11 to 21 mi) running through tunnels. The estimated construction time would be between 7 and 10 years, depending on the option selected, and the construction costs would amount to €1.1–1.3 billion. According to the preliminary study, the basic option would only include a new station in Bormio. Other planning variants envision additional stations in Taufers (Tubre) and in Müstair, Switzerland.

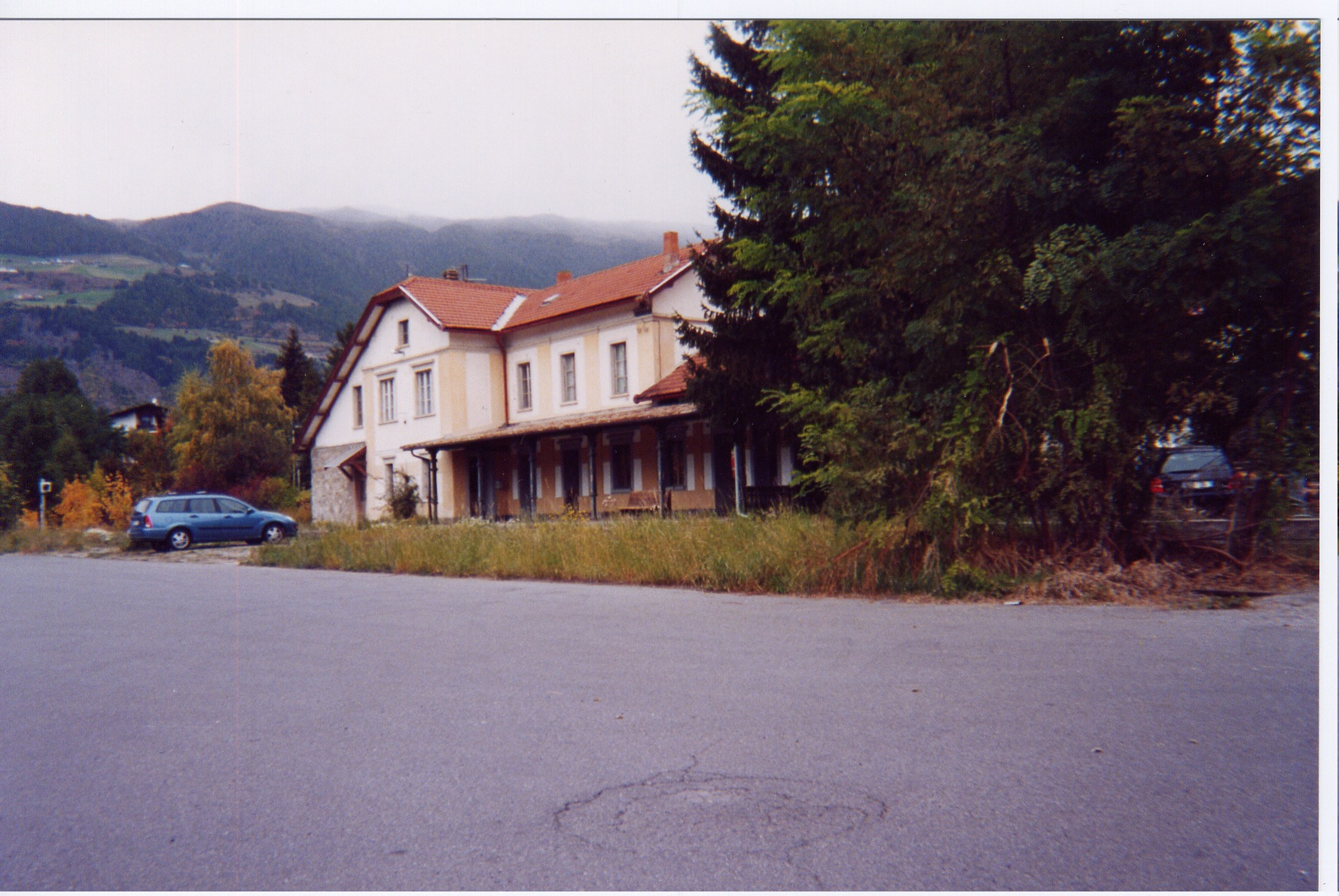
Mals train station during the period of closure.

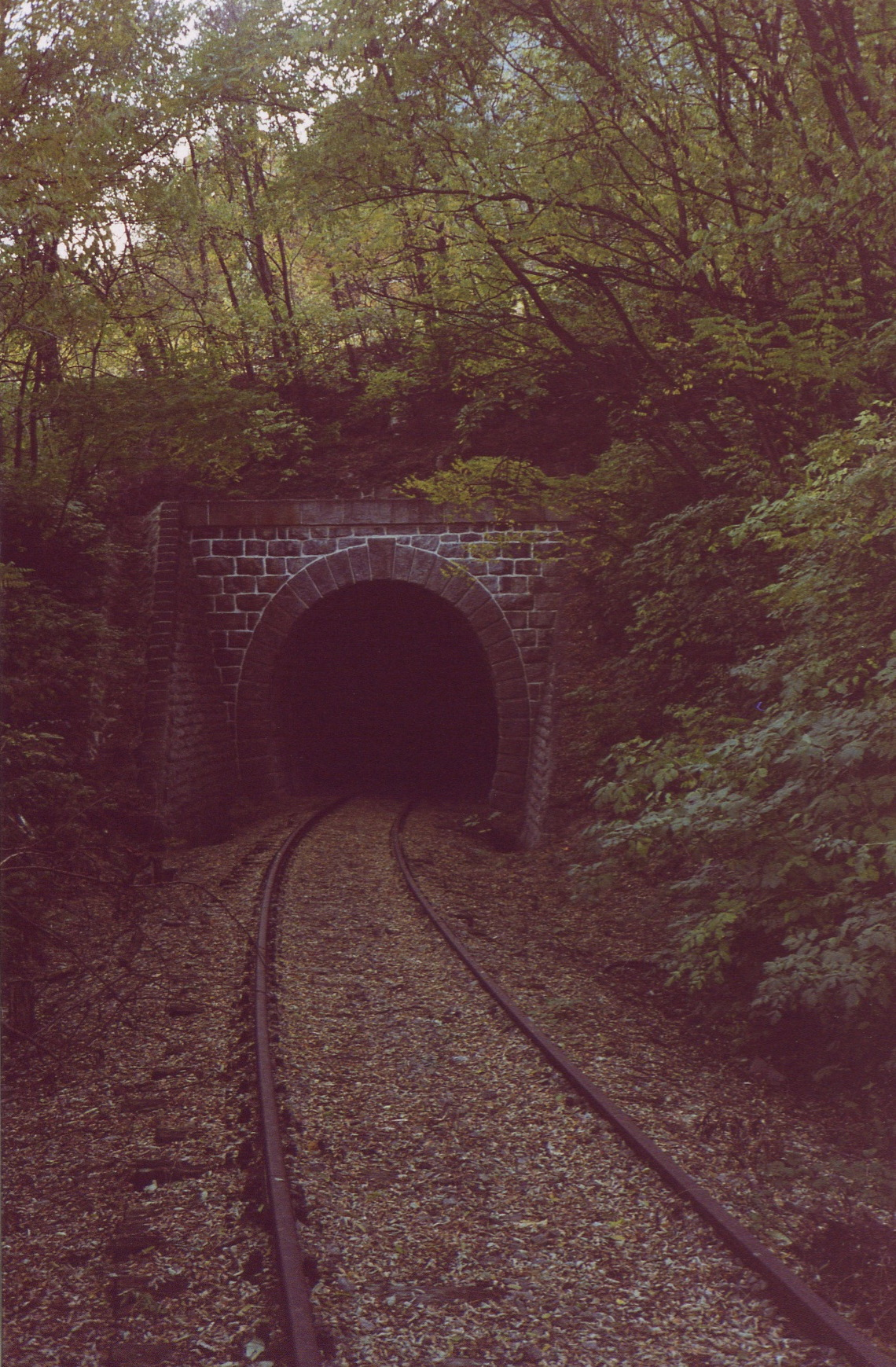
The hairpin tunnel near Marling during the years of stagnation.

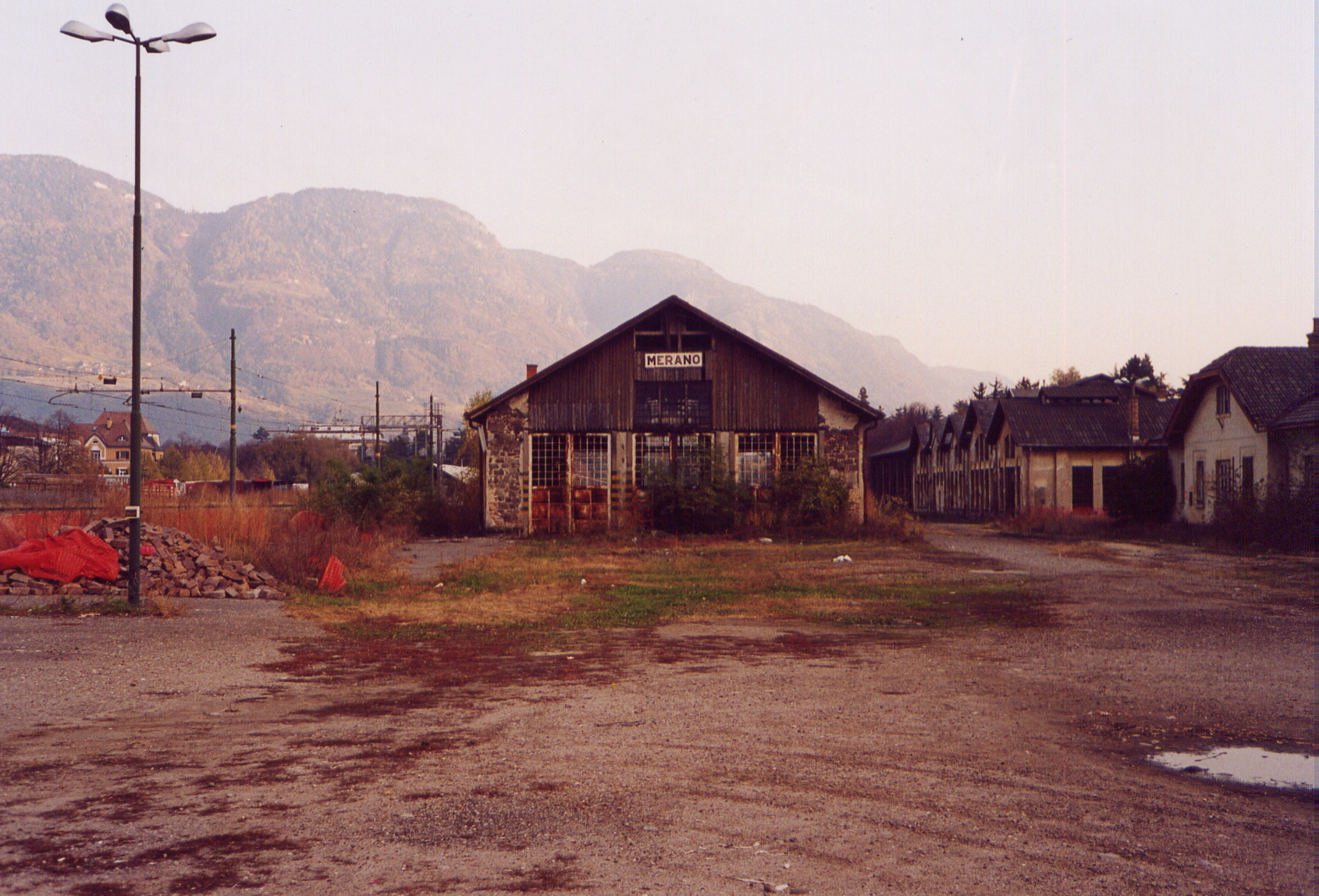
Condition of the locomotive shed at Meran station during the closure of the Vinschgau railway line.

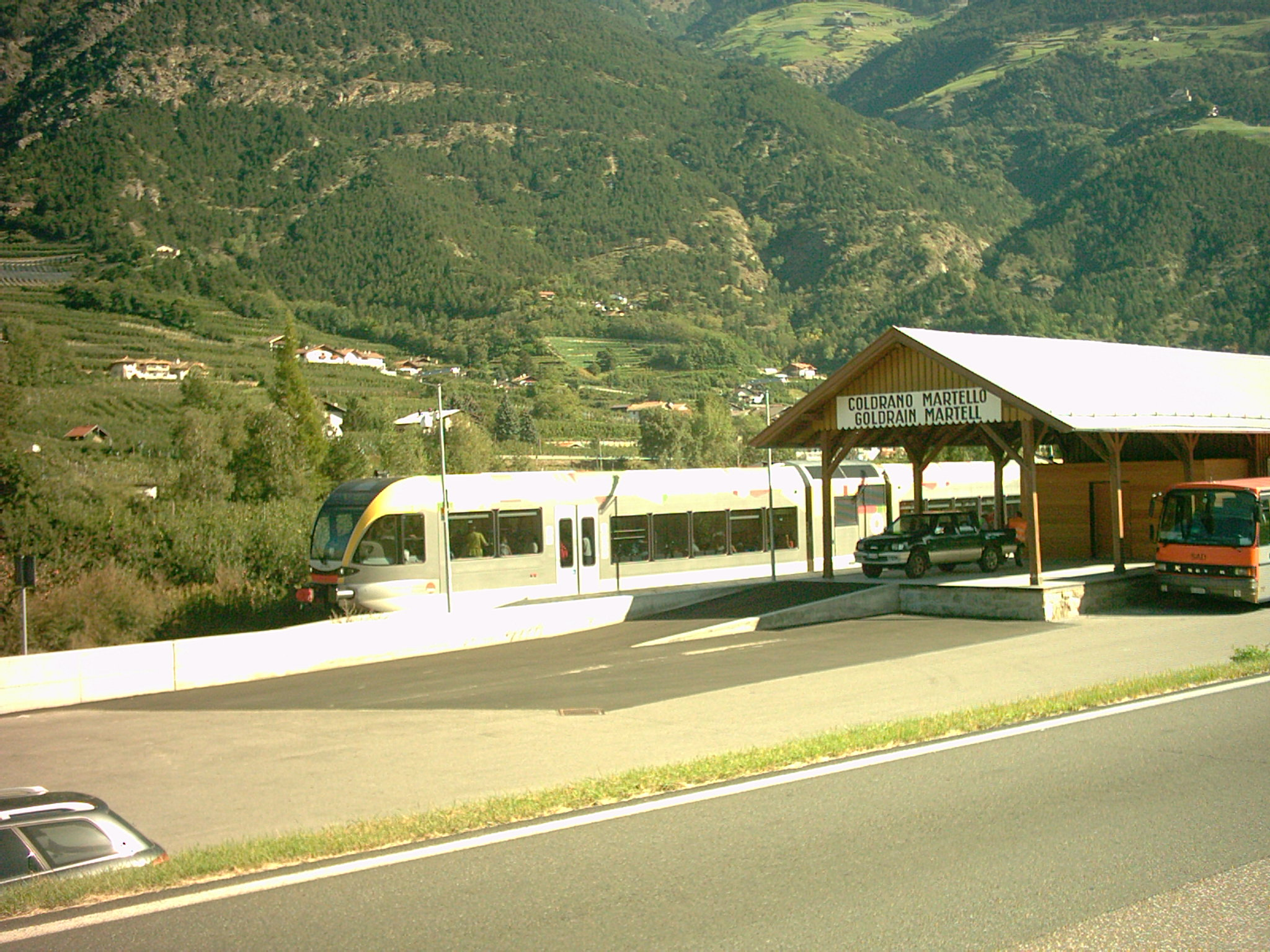
Goldrain (Coldrano) train station

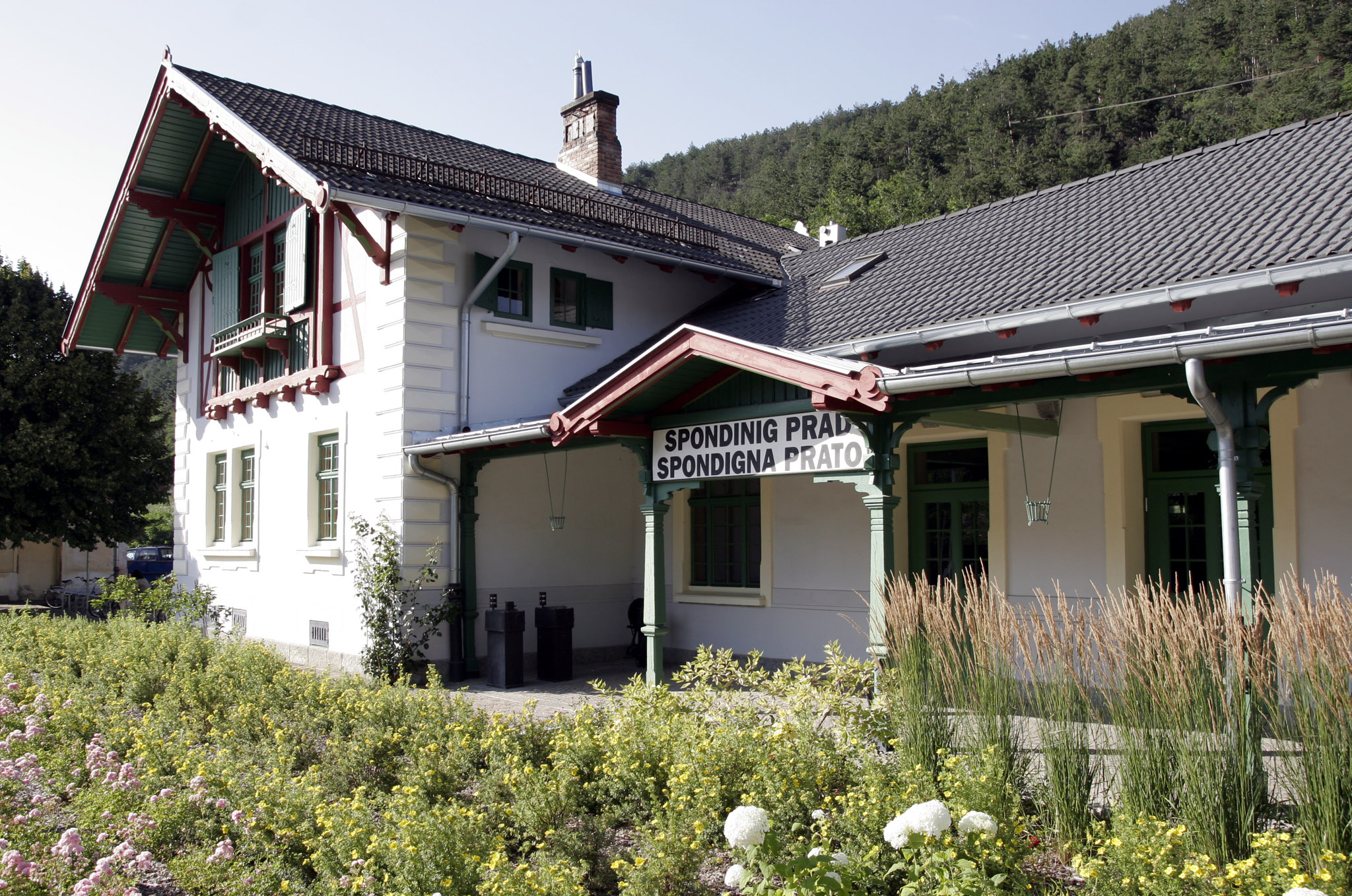
Spondinig (Spondigna) train station in Schluderns (Sluderno)

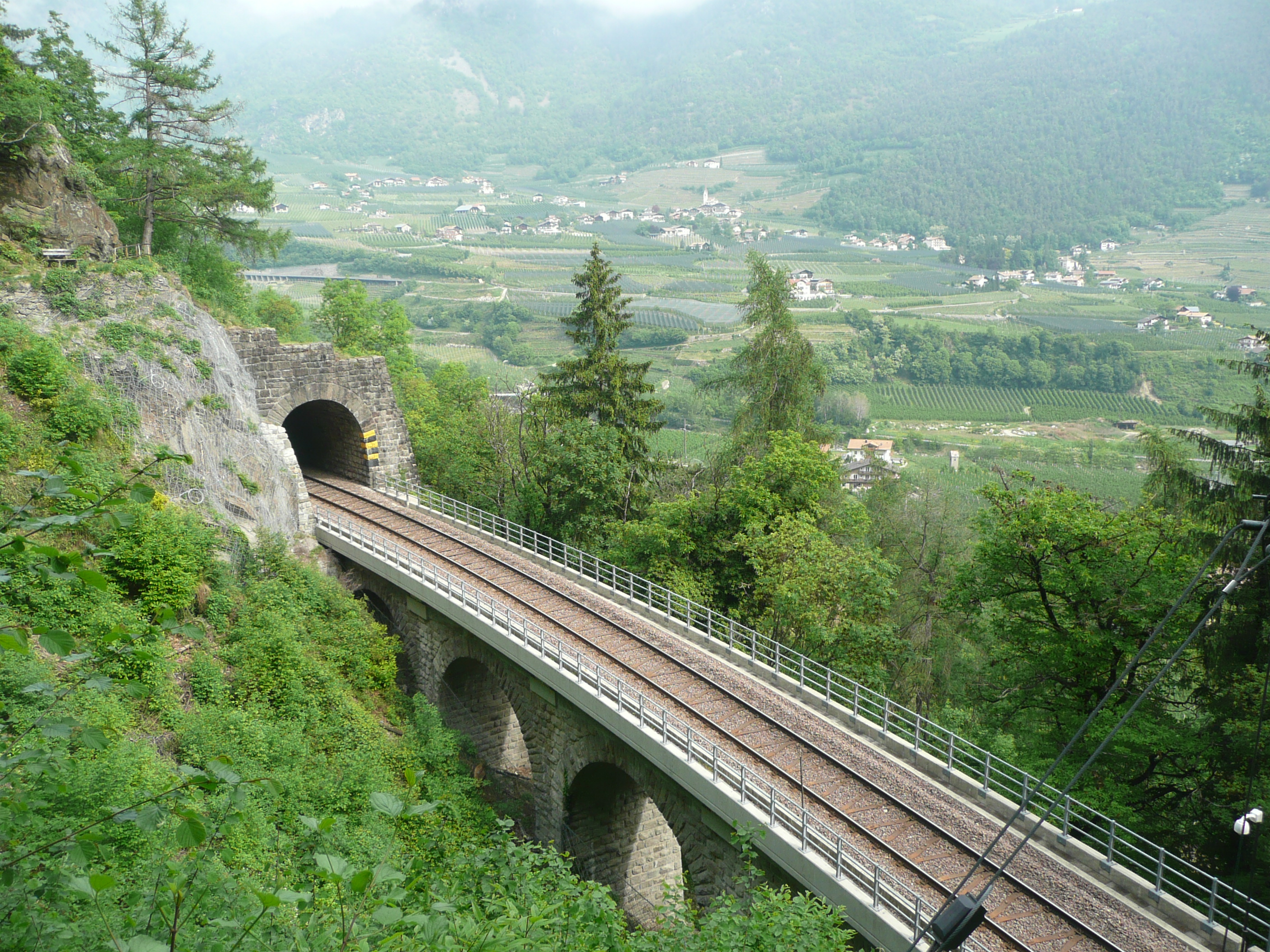
Viaduct and tunnel between Marling and Töll with a view towards Algund (Lagundo) from the Marling irrigation channel trail.

== Sources ==
- Atlante ferroviario d'Italia e Slovenia [Railway atlas of Italy and Slovenia] (in Italian). Cologne: Schweers + Wall. 2010. ISBN 978-3-89494-129-1.
