= Kastelbell-Tschars =

- Comune
- Gemeinde Kastelbell-Tschars; Comune di Castelbello-Ciardes
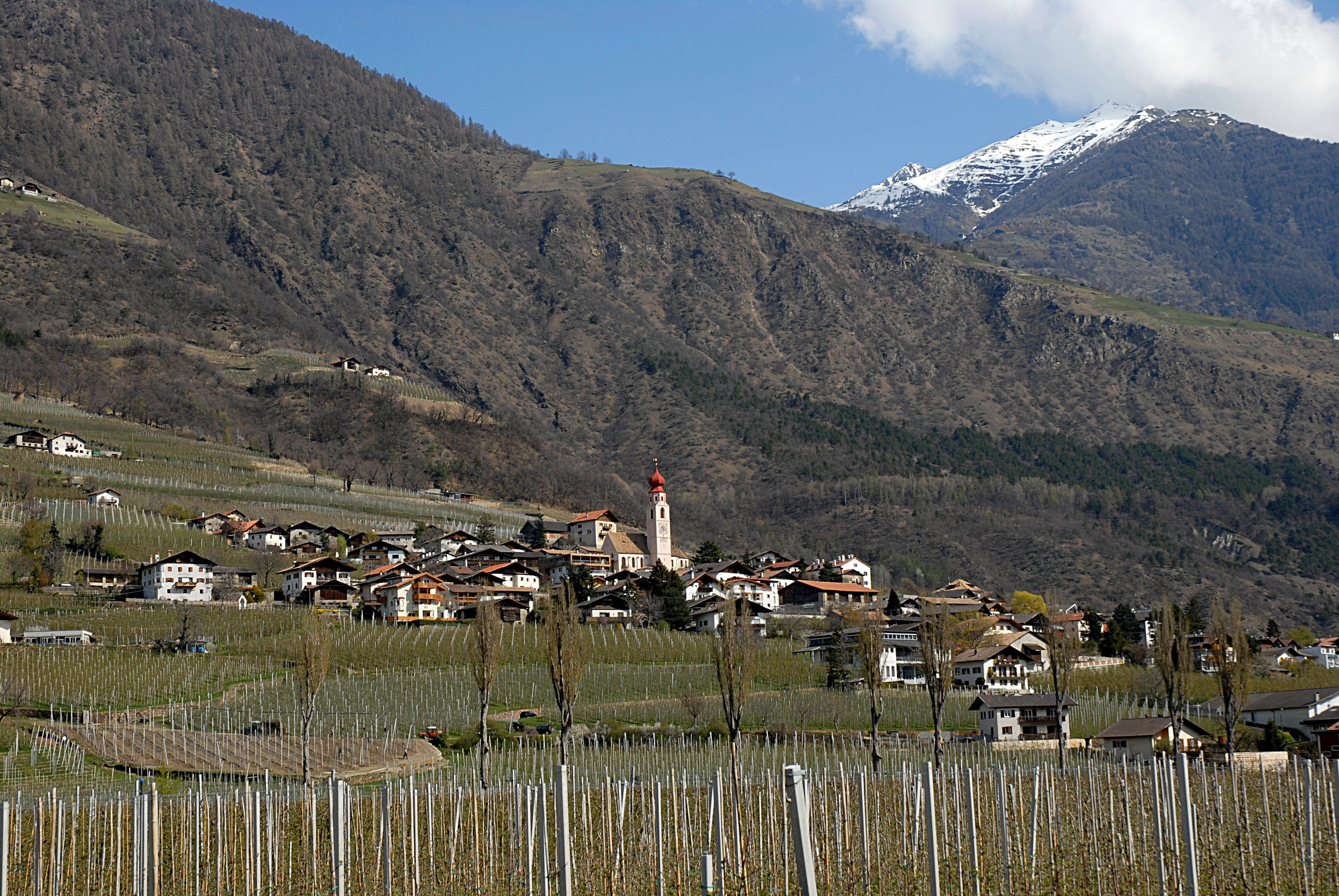
- View of Kastelbell-Tschars

- Coat of arms

- Location within Italy Location within Trentino-Alto Adige/Südtirol
- Coordinates: 46°38′N 10°54′E
- Country: Italy
- Region: Trentino-Alto Adige/Südtirol
- Province: South Tyrol (BZ)
- Frazioni: Kastelbell (Castelbello), Tschars (Ciardes), Freiberg (Montefranco), Galsaun (Colsano), Juval (Juvale), Latschinig (Lacinigo), Tomberg (Montefontana), Trumsberg (Montetrumes)

Government
  - Mayor: Gustav Tappeiner

Area
  - Total: 53.9 km^{2} (20.8 sq mi)

Population (Nov. 2010)
  - Total: 2,387
  - Density: 44.3/km^{2} (115/sq mi)
- Demonym(s): German:Kastelbeller or Tscharscher; Italian: castelbellesi
- Time zone: UTC+1 (CET)
  - Summer (DST): UTC+2 (CEST)
- Postal code: 39020
- Dialing code: 0473
- Website: Official website

Kastelbell-Tschars (German: [ˌkastl̩ˈbɛl ˈtʃaːɐ̯s]; Italian: Castelbello-Ciardes [kaˌstɛlˈbɛllo ˈtʃardes]) is a comune (municipality) in South Tyrol in northern Italy, located about 40 kilometres (25 mi) northwest of Bolzano.

== Geography ==
As of 30 November 2010, it had a population of 2,387 and an area of 53.9 square kilometres (20.8 mi^{2}).

Kastelbell-Tschars borders the following municipalities: Latsch, Naturns, Schnals and Ulten.

== History ==
=== Coat-of-arms ===
The emblem is a gules mill wheel, with eight paddles, on argent background. It retakes the insignia of Counts Hendl owners of the castle from 1531 to 1949.

== Society ==
=== Linguistic distribution ===
According to the 2024 census, 98.18% of the population speak German, 1.77% Italian and 0.05% Ladin as first language.

=== Demographic evolution ===
Historical population

Year	Pop.	±%
1860	?	—
1870	?	—
1880	1,572	—
1900	?	—
1910	1,589	—

Year	Pop.	±%
1921	1,656	+4.2%
1931	1,907	+15.2%
1936	1,954	+2.5%
1951	2,044	+4.6%
1961	2,158	+5.6%

Year	Pop.	±%
1971	2,187	+1.3%
1981	2,305	+5.4%
1991	2,317	+0.5%
2001	2,328	+0.5%

Source: Data from ISTAT
