= Plaus =

- Comune
- Gemeinde Plaus; Comune di Plaus
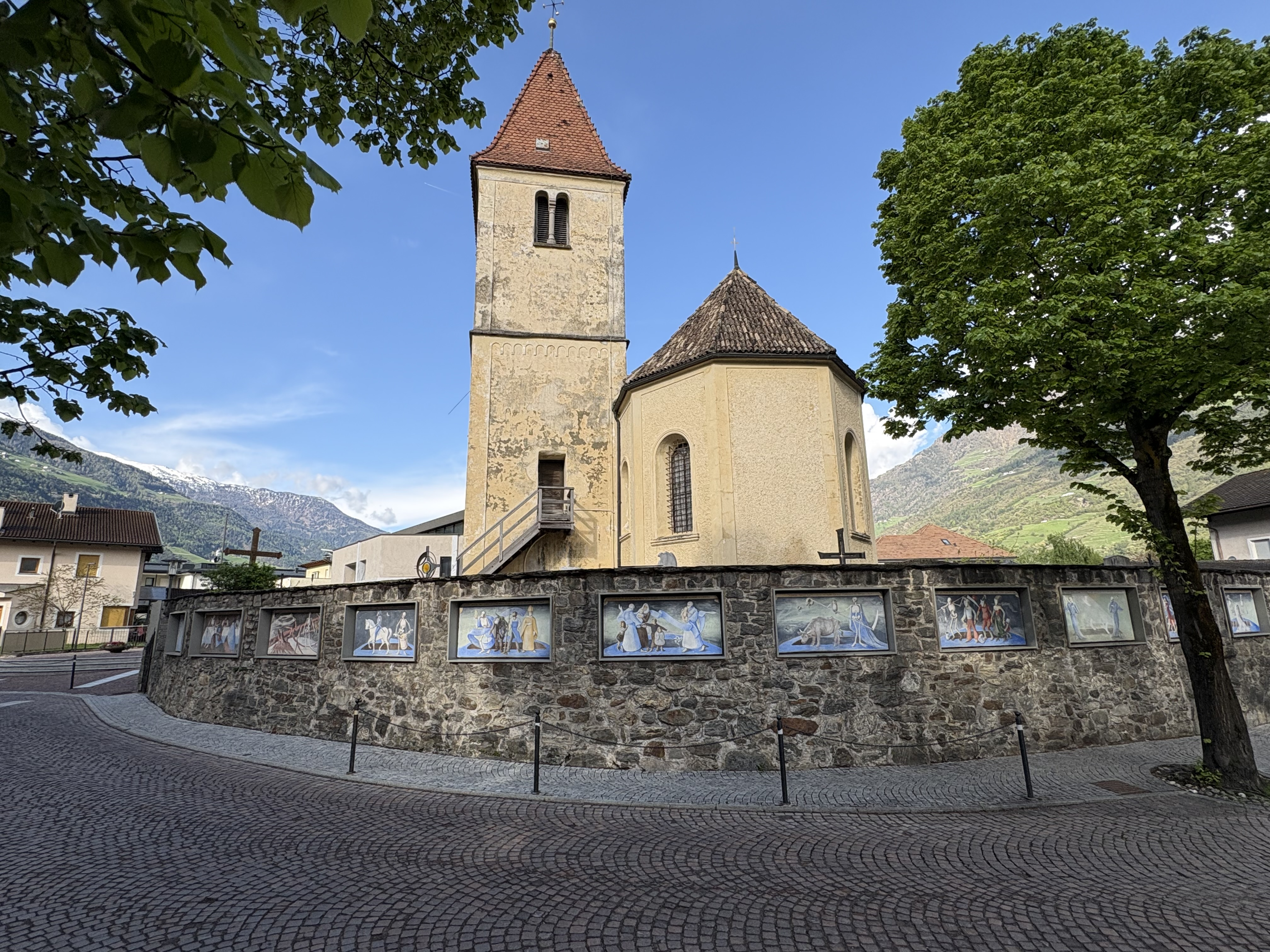
- Church of Saint Ulrich

- Location within Italy Location within Trentino-Alto Adige/Südtirol
- Coordinates: 46°39′N 11°02′E
- Country: Italy
- Region: Trentino-Alto Adige/Südtirol
- Province: South Tyrol (BZ)

Government
  - Mayor: Jürgen Klotz

Area
  - Total: 4.9 km^{2} (1.9 sq mi)

Population (Nov. 2010)
  - Total: 683
  - Density: 140/km^{2} (360/sq mi)
- Demonym(s): German: Plauser; Italian: plausini
- Time zone: UTC+1 (CET)
  - Summer (DST): UTC+2 (CEST)
- Postal code: 39025
- Dialing code: 0473
- Website: Official website

Plaus (Italian pronunciation: [ˈplaus]; German pronunciation: [plaʊ̯s]) is a comune (municipality) and a village in South Tyrol in northern Italy, located about 30 kilometres (19 mi) north-west of the city of Bolzano.

== Geography ==
As of July 2023, the municipality had a population of 762 and an area of 187.0 square kilometres (72.2 mi^{2}).

Plaus is one of the three municipalities of South Tyrol whose name remained unchanged by the early 20th century renaming programme which aimed at replacing mostly German place names with Italianised versions, the other two being Gais and Lana.

Plaus borders the following municipalities: Algund, Naturns and Partschins.

== History ==
=== Coat-of-arms ===
The shield is argent a fess gules and three sable eagles. It is the arms of the Lord of Tarant, who lived in the Tarantsberg Castle until 1291. The emblem was adopted in 1966.

== Society ==
=== Linguistic distribution ===
According to the 2024 census, 95.27% of the population speaks German, 4.57% Italian and 0.15% Ladin as their first language.

=== Demographic evolution ===
Historical population

Year	Pop.	±%
1860	?	—
1870	?	—
1880	140	—
1900	?	—
1910	154	—

Year	Pop.	±%
1921	183	+18.8%
1931	238	+30.1%
1936	236	−0.8%
1951	248	+5.1%
1961	290	+16.9%

Year	Pop.	±%
1971	289	−0.3%
1981	353	+22.1%
1991	380	+7.6%
2001	547	+43.9%
2021	740	+35.3%

Source: Data from ISTAT
