= Partschins =

- Comune
- Gemeinde Partschins; Comune di Parcines
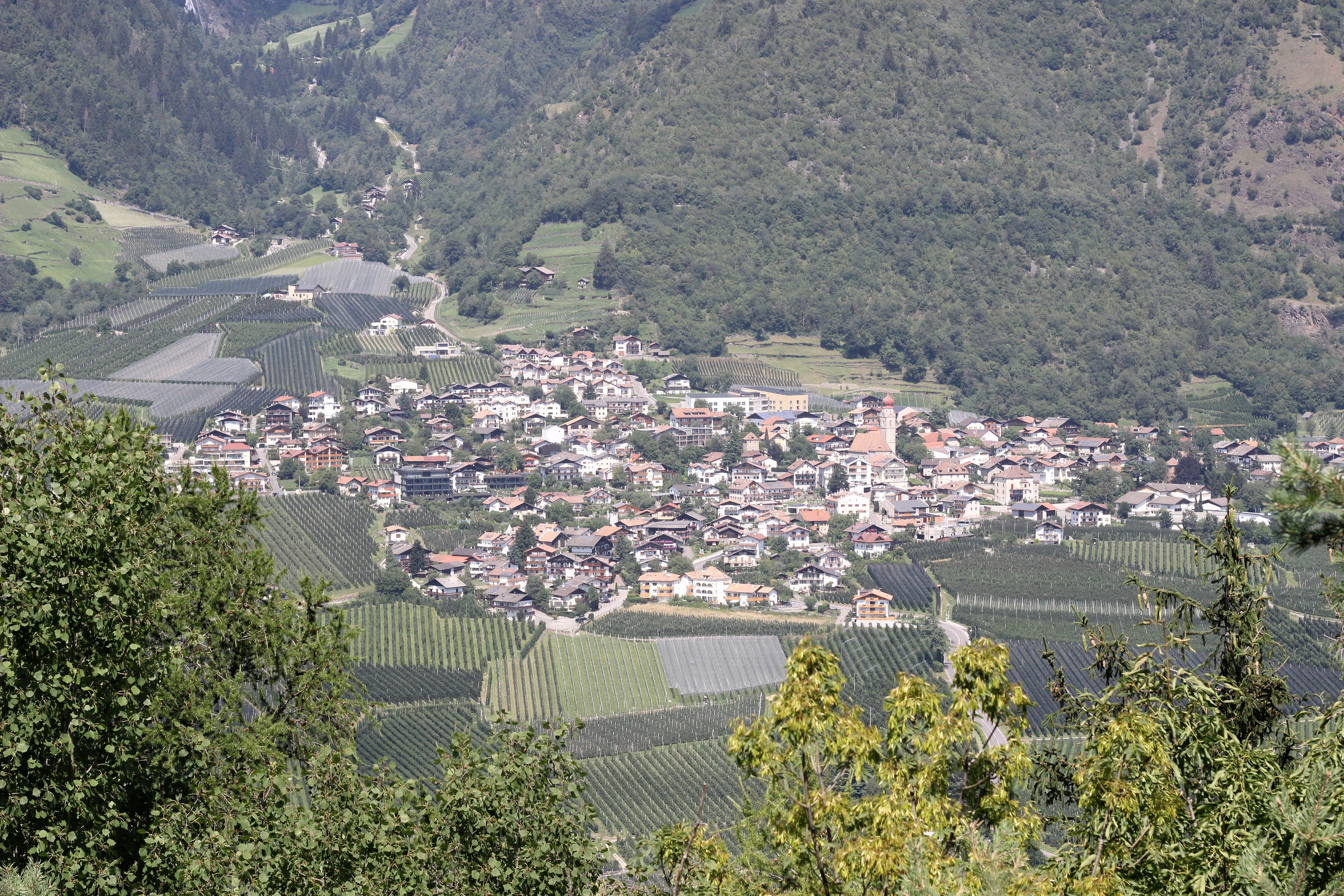
- View of Partschins

- Location within Italy Location within Trentino-Alto Adige/Südtirol
- Coordinates: 46°41′N 11°4′E
- Country: Italy
- Region: Trentino-Alto Adige/Südtirol
- Province: South Tyrol (BZ)
- Frazioni: Sonnenberg (Montesole), Quadrathöfe (Quadrato), Rabland (Rablà), Tabland (Tablà), Töll (Tel), Vertigen (Vallettina)

Government
  - Mayor: Alois Forcher

Area
  - Total: 55.4 km^{2} (21.4 sq mi)

Population (Nov. 2010)
  - Total: 3,523
  - Density: 63.6/km^{2} (165/sq mi)
- Demonym(s): German: Partschinser; Italian: parcinesi
- Time zone: UTC+1 (CET)
  - Summer (DST): UTC+2 (CEST)
- Postal code: 39020
- Dialing code: 0473
- Website: Official website

Partschins (German pronunciation: [parˈtʃɪns]; Italian: Parcines [parˈtʃiːnes]) is a comune (municipality) and a village in the province of South Tyrol in northern Italy, located about 30 kilometres (19 mi) northwest of the city of Bolzano.

== Geography ==
As of 30 November 2010, it had a population of 3,523 and an area of 55.4 square kilometres (21.4 mi^{2}).

Partschins borders the following municipalities: Algund, Lana, Marling, Moos in Passeier, Naturns, Plaus, Schnals, and Tirol.

=== Frazioni ===
The municipality contains the frazioni (subdivisions, mainly villages and hamlets) Sonnenberg (Montesole), Quadrathöfe (Quadrato), Rabland (Rablà), Tabland (Tablà), Töll (Tel) and Vertigen (Vallettina).

== History ==
=== Coat-of-arms ===
The emblem represents a plow, placed diagonally on argent. The emblem is similar to that of the Knight Randolf von Partschins, a descendant of the noble family Götsch, who founded the village in about 1200, under the name Castle Stachlburg. The emblem was adopted July 25, 1967.

== Society ==
=== Linguistic distribution ===
According to the 2024 census, 94.89% of the population speak German, 4.84% Italian and 0.27% Ladin as first language.

=== Demographic evolution ===
Historical population

Year	Pop.	±%
1860	?	—
1870	?	—
1880	1,331	—
1900	?	—
1910	1,706	—

Year	Pop.	±%
1921	1,760	+3.2%
1931	1,863	+5.9%
1936	1,983	+6.4%
1951	1,874	−5.5%
1961	2,033	+8.5%

Year	Pop.	±%
1971	2,378	+17.0%
1981	2,699	+13.5%
1991	2,911	+7.9%
2001	3,192	+9.7%

Source: Data from ISTAT
