= Naturns =

- Comune
- Gemeinde Naturns; Comune di Naturno
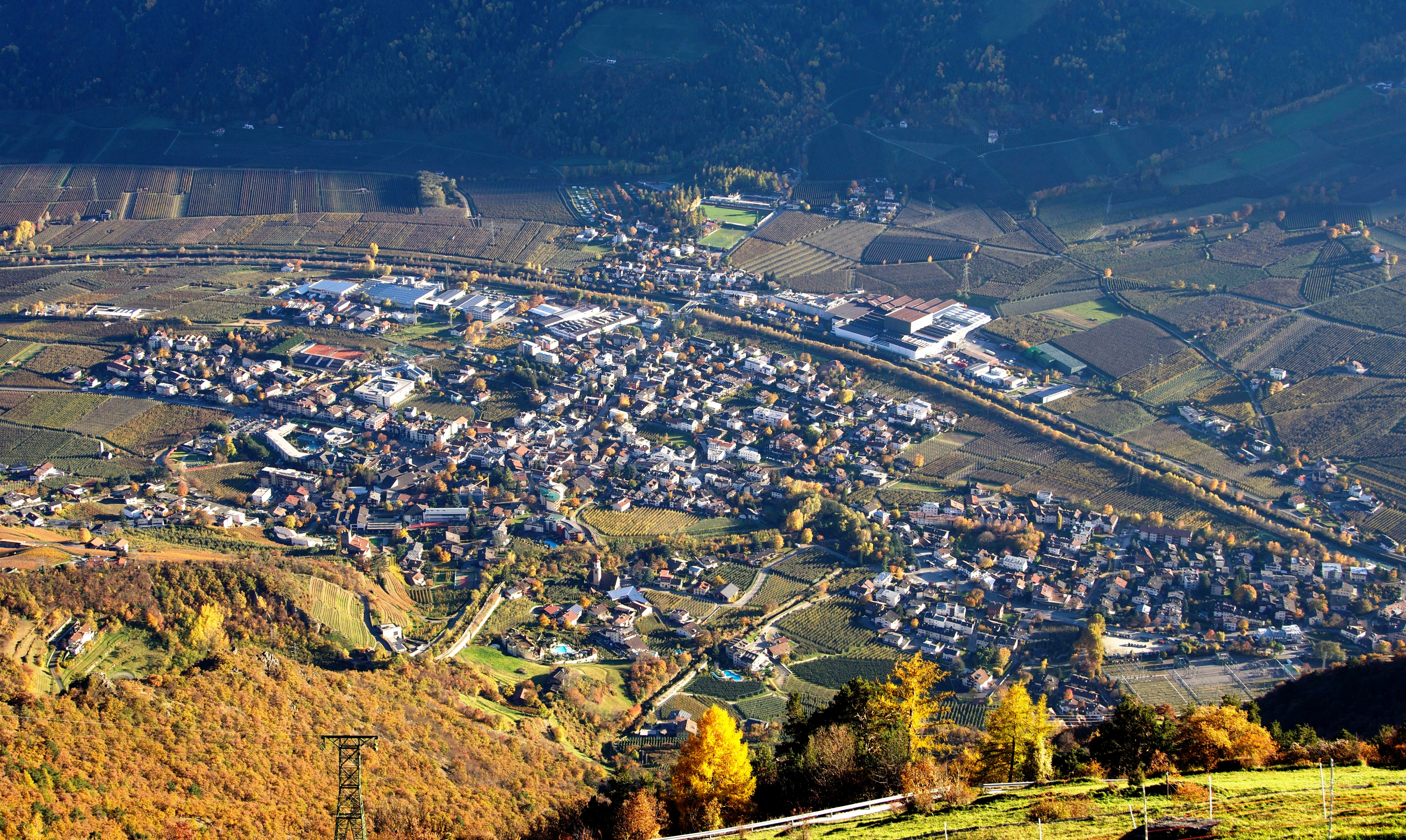
- View of Naturns

- Coat of arms

- Location within Italy Location within Trentino-Alto Adige/Südtirol
- Coordinates: 46°39′00″N 11°00′15″E
- Country: Italy
- Region: Trentino-Alto Adige/Südtirol
- Province: South Tyrol (BZ)
- Frazioni: Staben (Stava), Tabland (Tablà)

Government
  - Mayor: Zeno Christanell

Area
  - Total: 67.0 km^{2} (25.9 sq mi)

Population (Dec. 2015)
  - Total: 5,739
  - Density: 85.7/km^{2} (222/sq mi)
- Demonym(s): German: Naturnser; Italian: naturnesi
- Time zone: UTC+1 (CET)
  - Summer (DST): UTC+2 (CEST)
- Postal code: 39025
- Dialing code: 0473
- Website: gemeinde.naturns.bz.it

Naturns (German pronunciation: [naˈtʊrns]; Italian: Naturno [naˈturno]) is a comune (municipality) and a village in the province of South Tyrol in northern Italy, located about 40 kilometres (25 mi) northwest of the city of Bolzano.

== Geography ==
As of 31 December 2015, it had a population of 5,739 and an area of 67.0 square kilometres (25.9 mi^{2}).

Naturns borders the following municipalities: Kastelbell-Tschars, Algund, Lana, Partschins, Plaus, St. Pankraz, Schnals, and Ulten.

=== Frazioni ===
The municipality contains the frazioni (subdivisions, mainly villages and hamlets) Staben (Stava) and Tabland (Tablà).

== History ==
=== Coat-of-arms ===
The shield azure and an equilateral triangle of or. It is taken from that of the old dynasty of the Lords of Nals who lived in the village until 1380. The coat of arms was granted in 1966.

== Society ==
=== Linguistic distribution ===
According to the 2024 census, 95.78% of the population speak German, 4.06% Italian and 0.17% Ladin as first language.

=== Demographic evolution ===
Historical population

Year	Pop.	±%
1860	?	—
1870	?	—
1880	2,201	—
1900	?	—
1910	2,416	—

Year	Pop.	±%
1921	2,518	+4.2%
1931	2,657	+5.5%
1936	2,847	+7.2%
1951	2,917	+2.5%
1961	3,084	+5.7%

Year	Pop.	±%
1971	3,579	+16.1%
1981	4,027	+12.5%
1991	4,535	+12.6%
2001	5,089	+12.2%

Source: Data from ISTAT

== Places of interest ==
- St. Proculus Church: built in the seventh century, conserves pre-Carolingian frescos
- Juval Castle: residence of Reinhold Messner, displays different art exhibitions
- Texel Group Nature Park
- Train World
- Erlebnisbad/ Acquavventura Naturno

== Events ==
- Schwalbe-TOUR-Transalp (MTB race in seven stages across the Austrian and Italian Alps)
- Ötzi Alpine Marathon (extreme triathlon/mountain biking, running, ski mountaineering)
- Naturno Pottery Market (international participation, every two years)
- The Night of Lights (dine under the stars, in July)
- Naturno laughs! (International Summer Comedy Festival)
- Riesling Wine Festival (Naturno Gourmet Autumn)
- Farmer's Cooking from the Monte Sole (Naturno Gourmet Autumn)
- Chestnut Festival in Naturno (traditional culinary experience, on Wednesdays in October)

== Gallery ==
Naturns

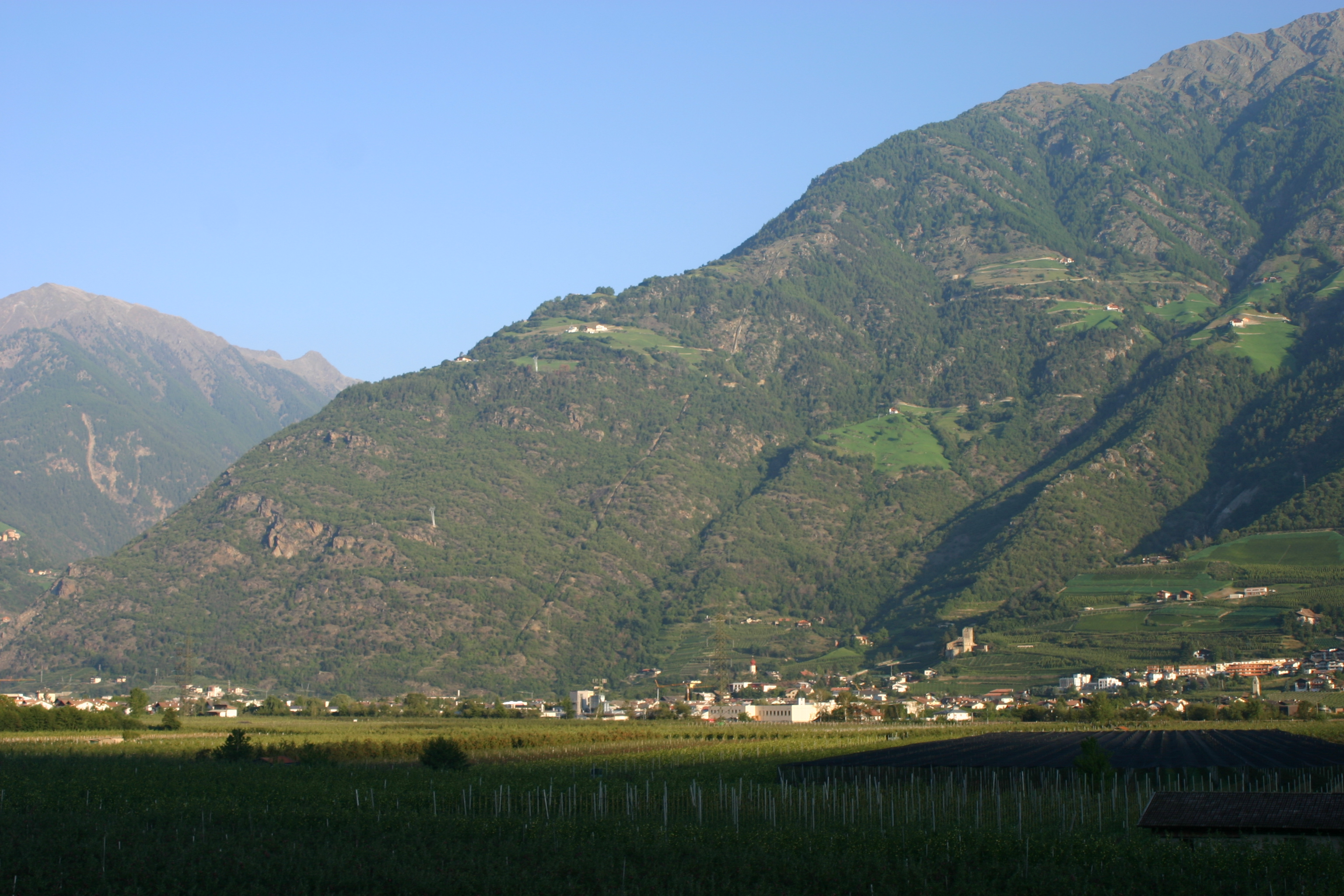
Naturns

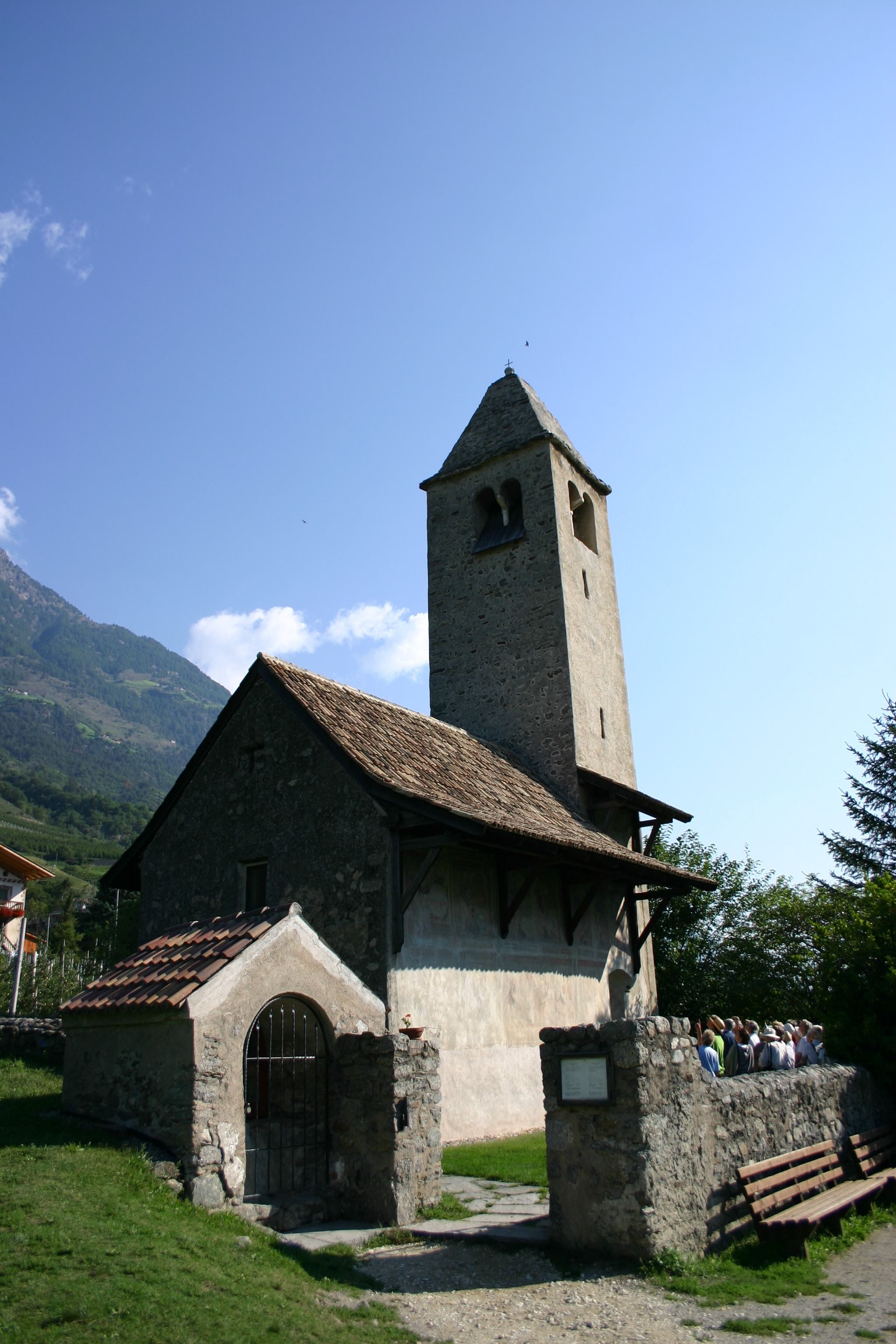
Church of St. Proculus

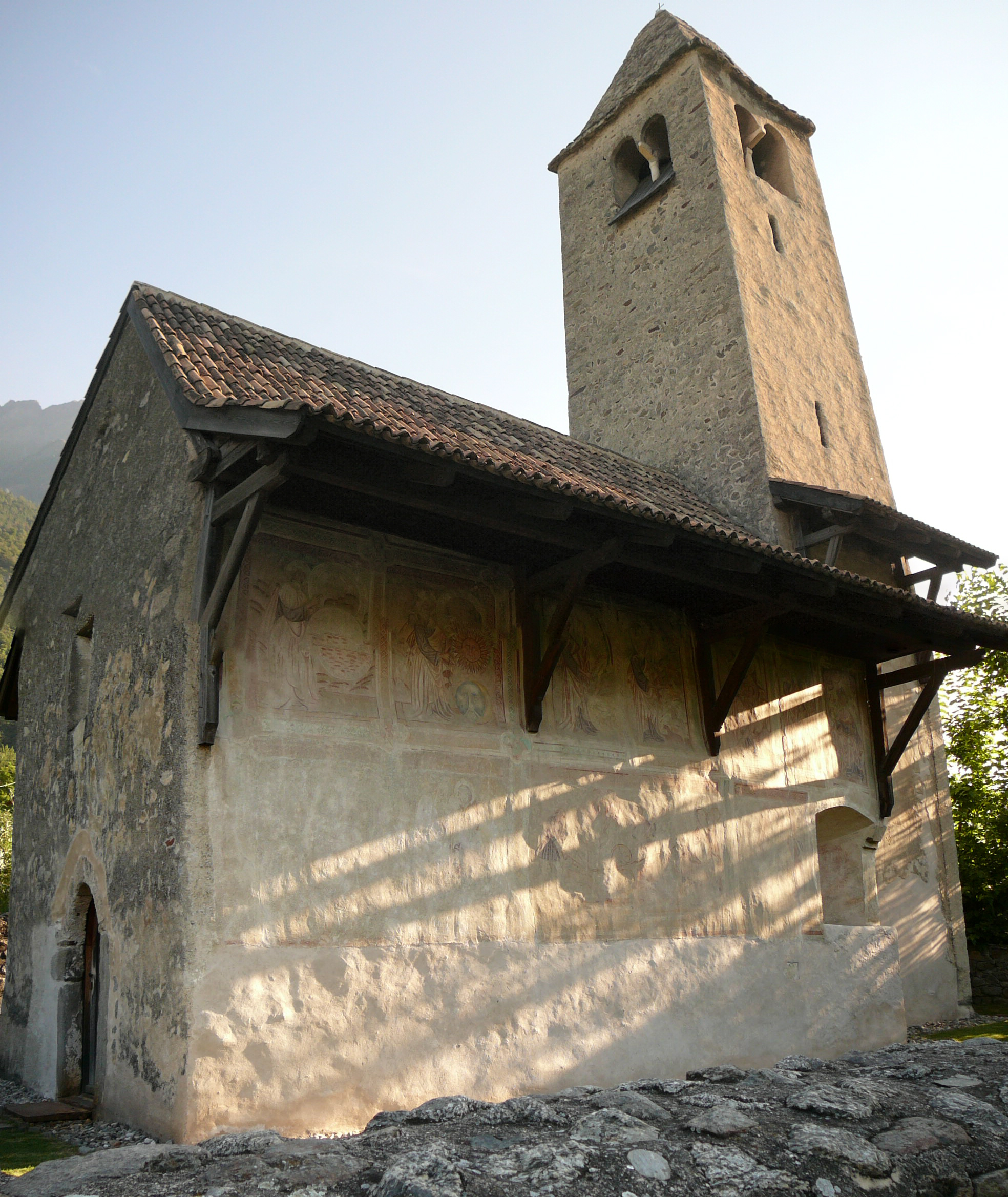
Church of St. Proculus, south wall

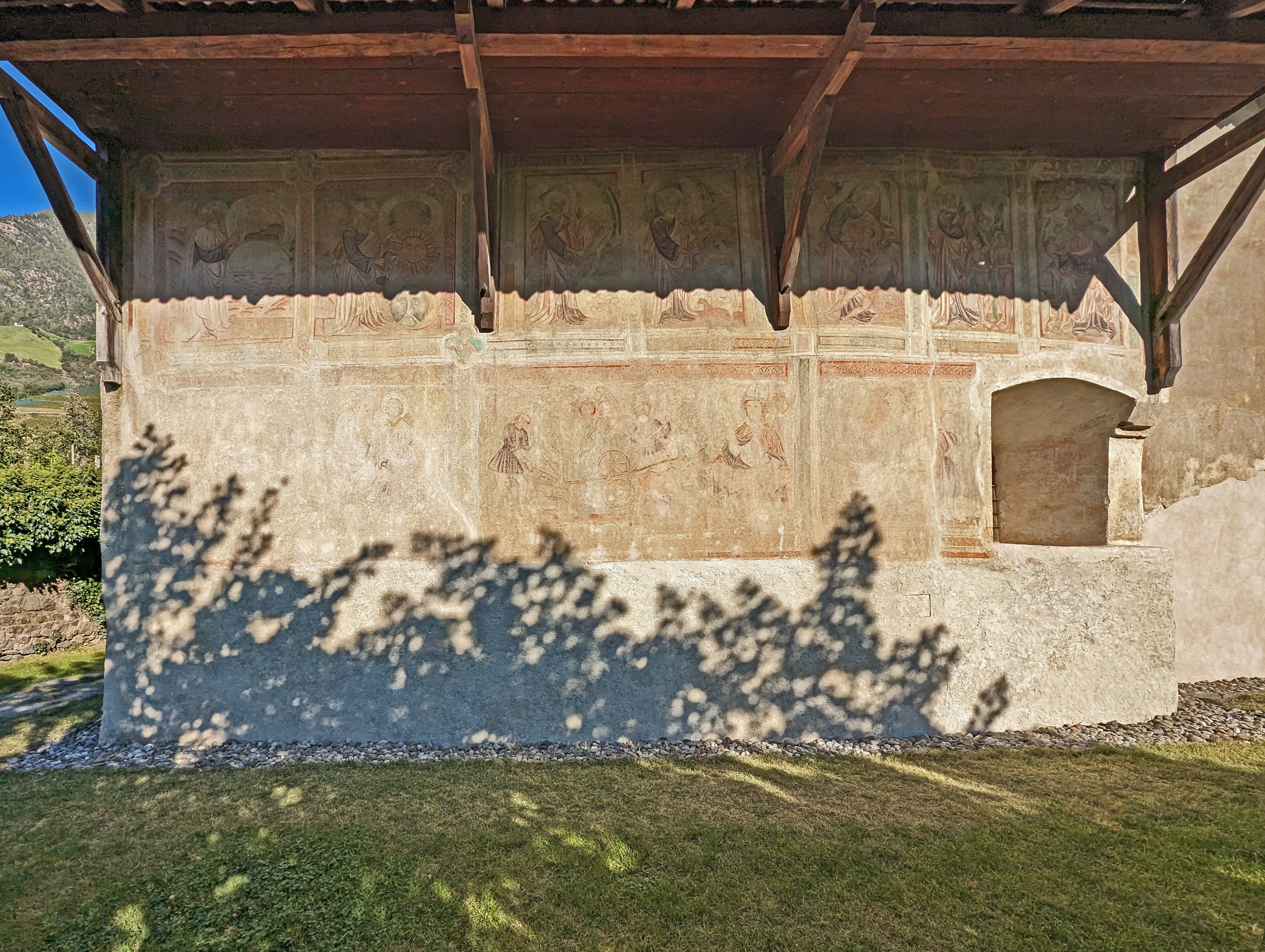
Church of St. Proculus, south wall

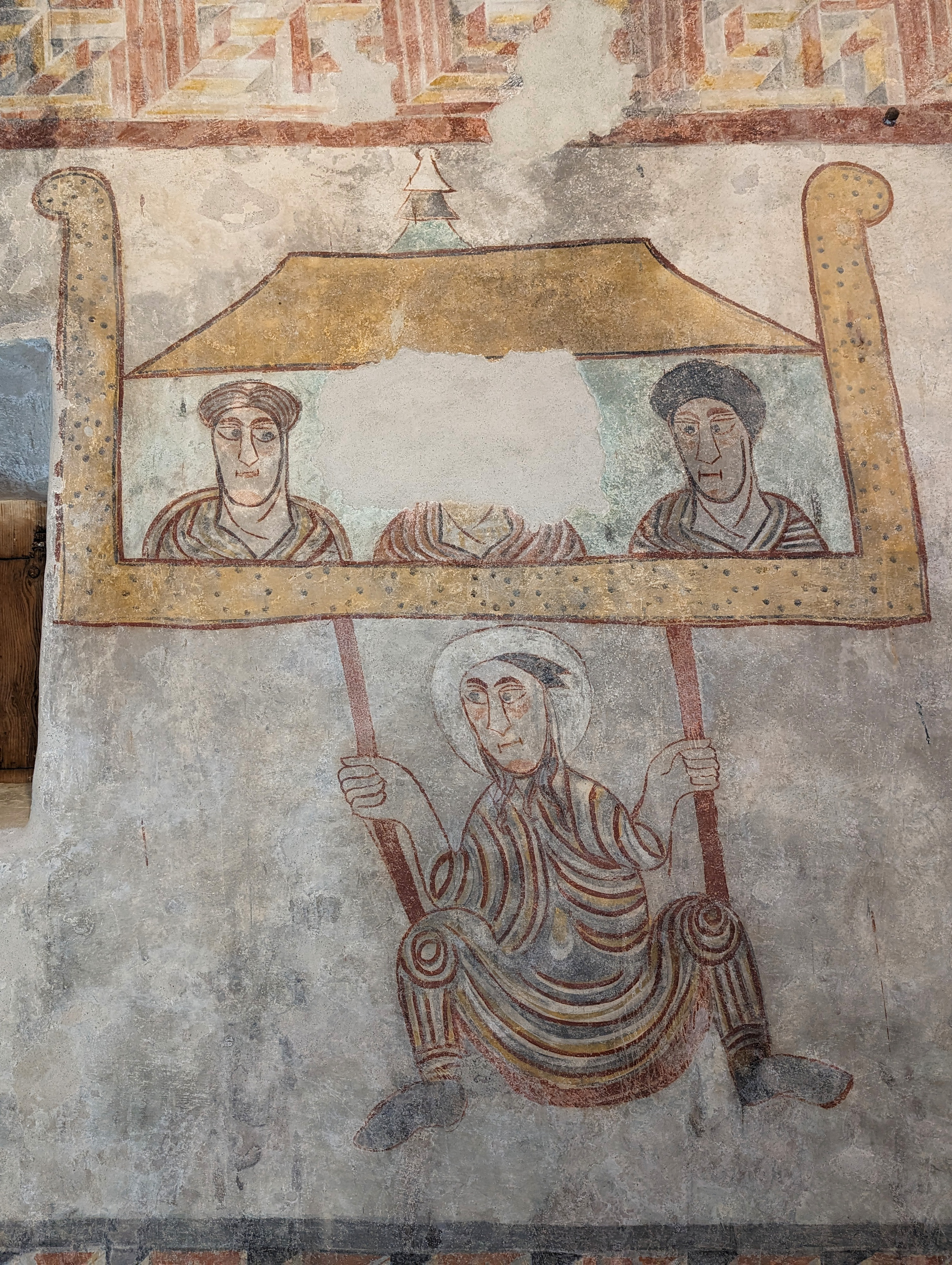
Romanesque fresco of St. Proculus

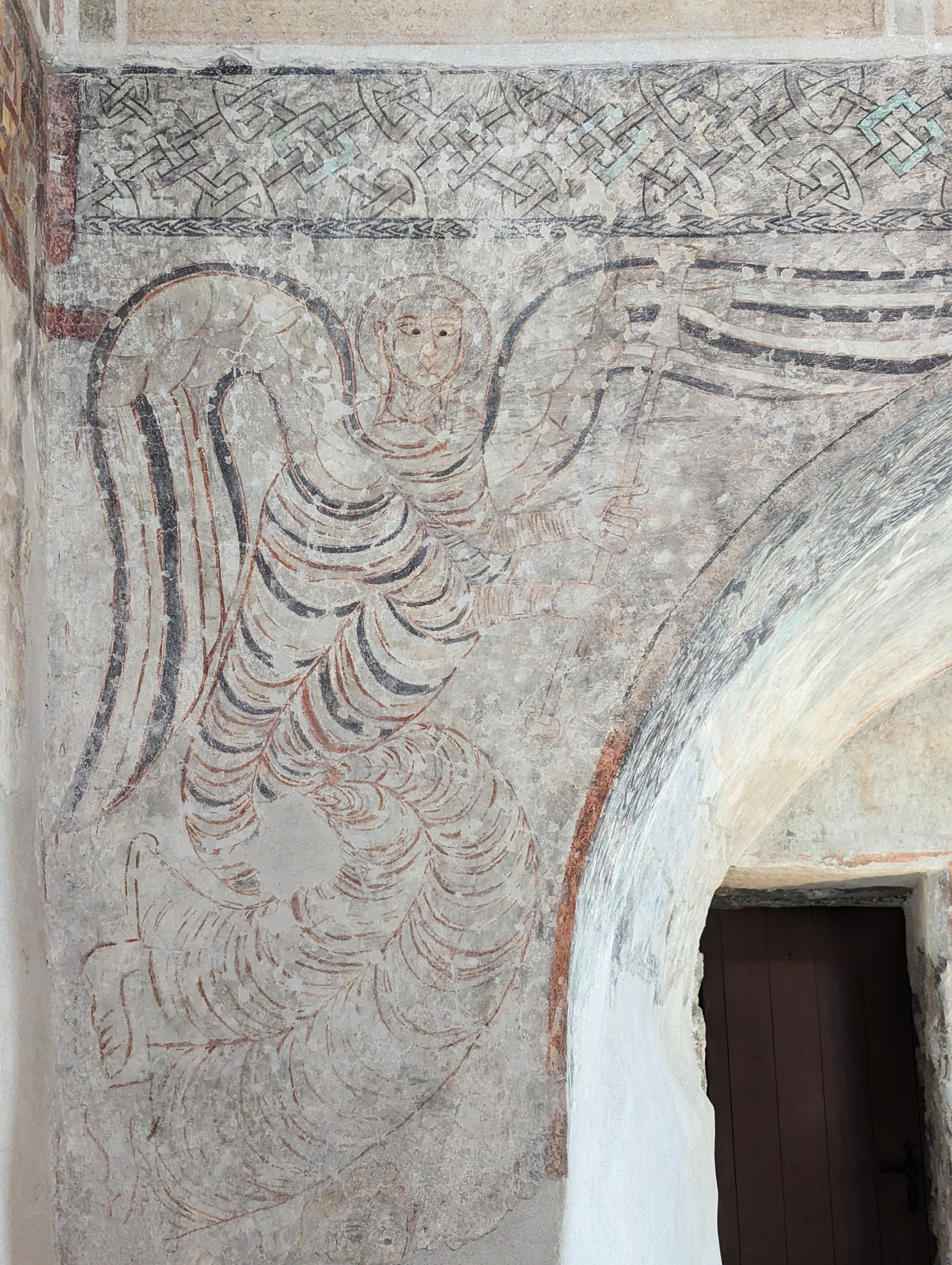
Romanesque fresco of St. Proculus

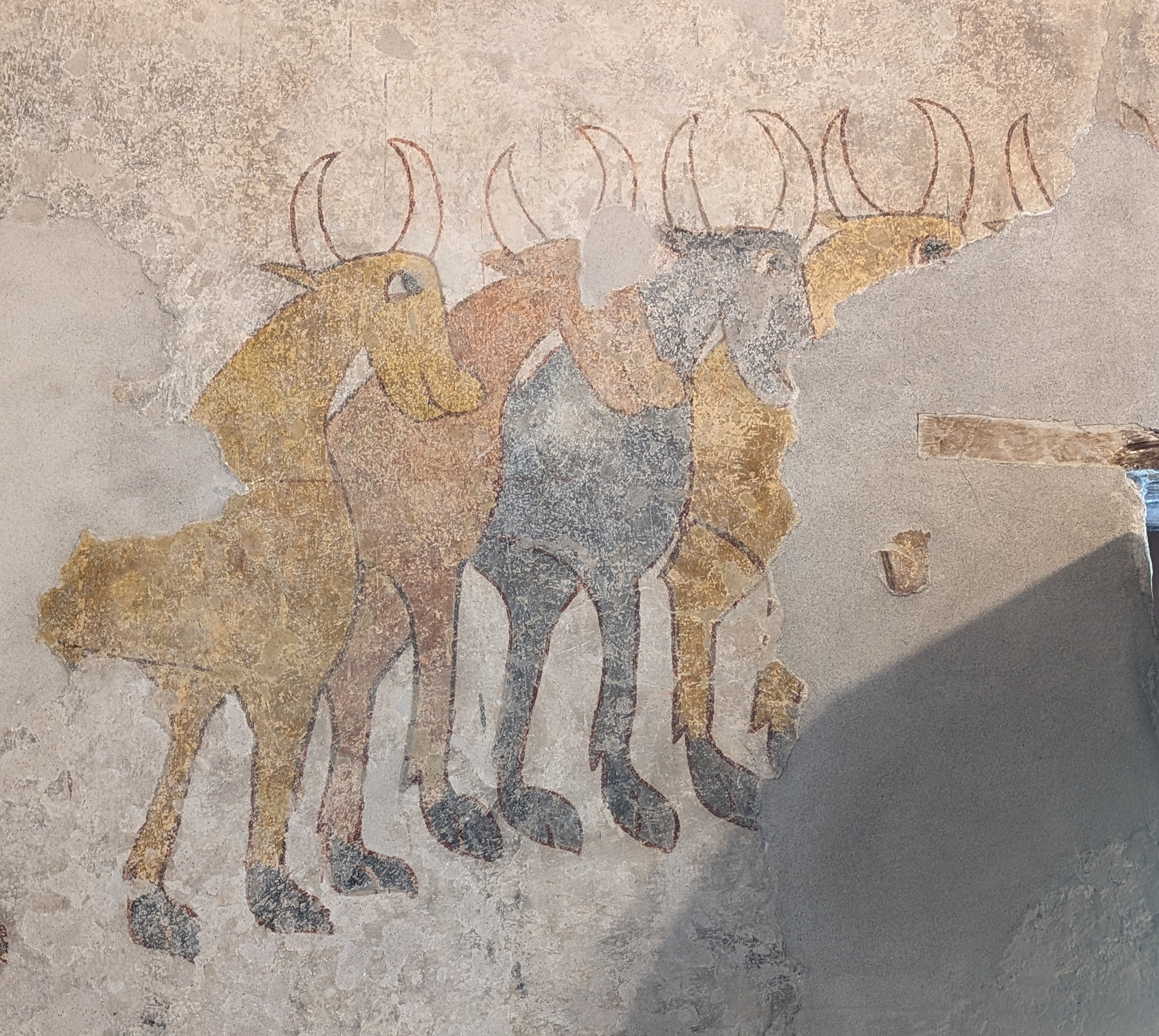
Romanesque fresco of St. Proculus

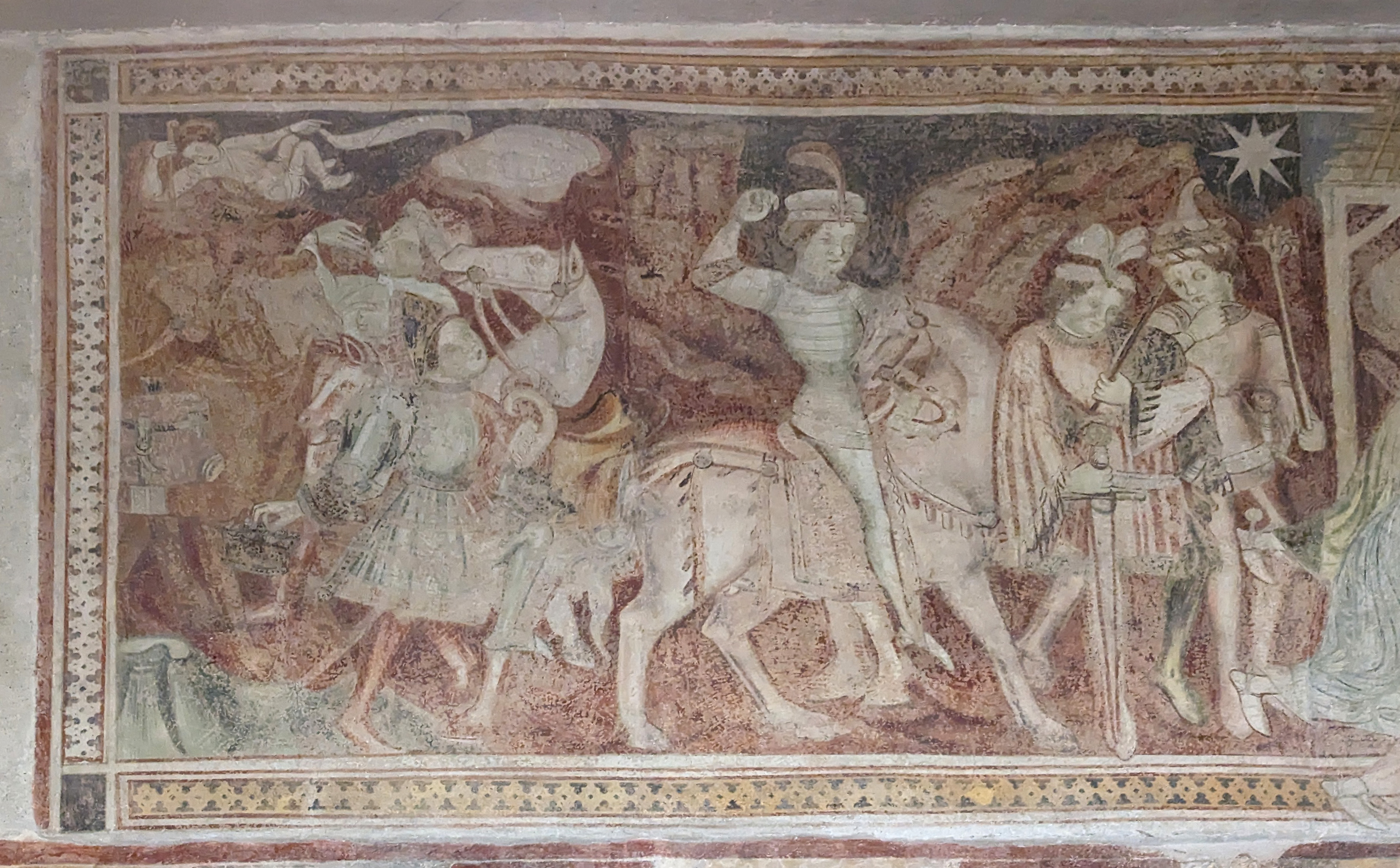
Gothic fresco of St. Proculus

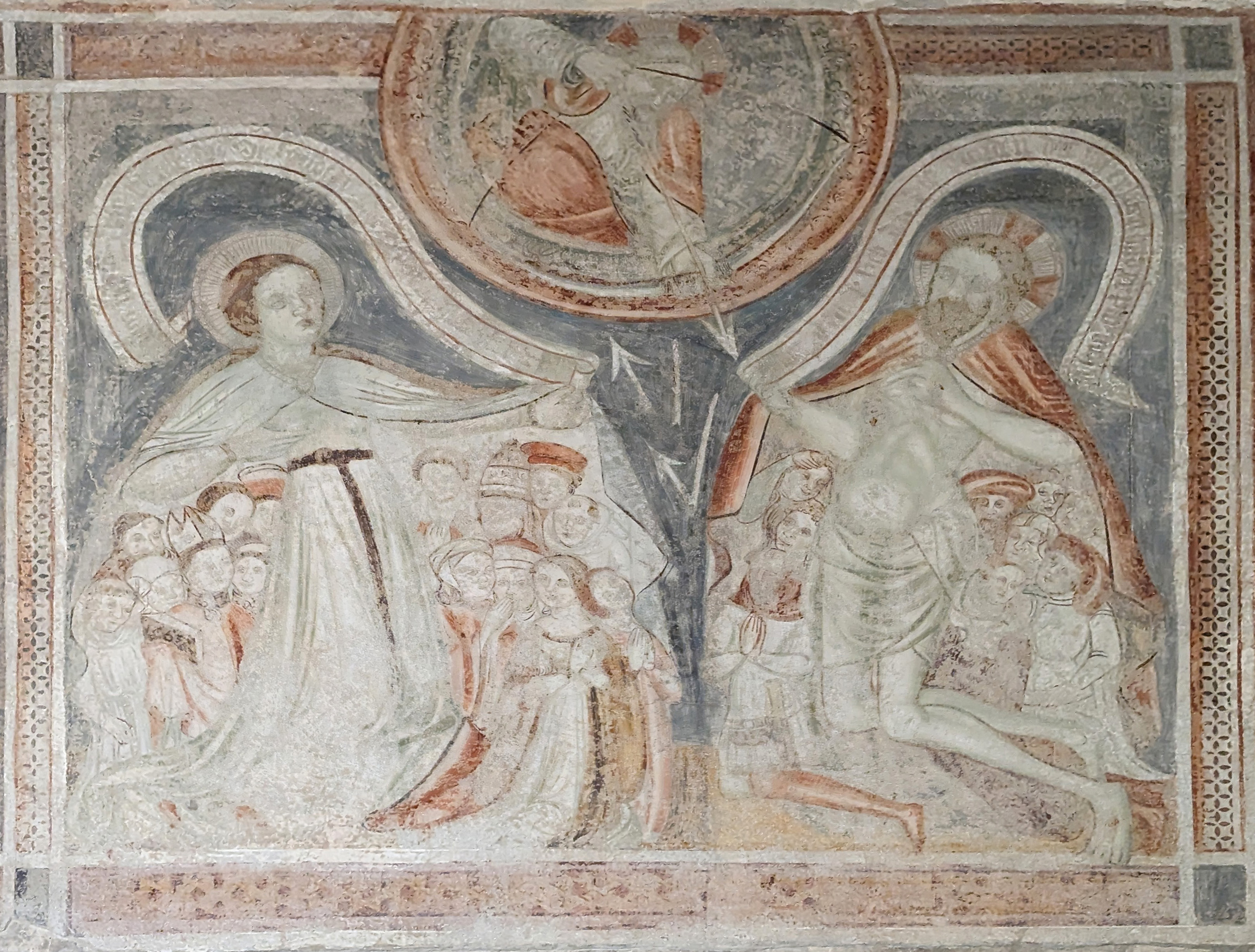
Gothic fresco of St. Proculus

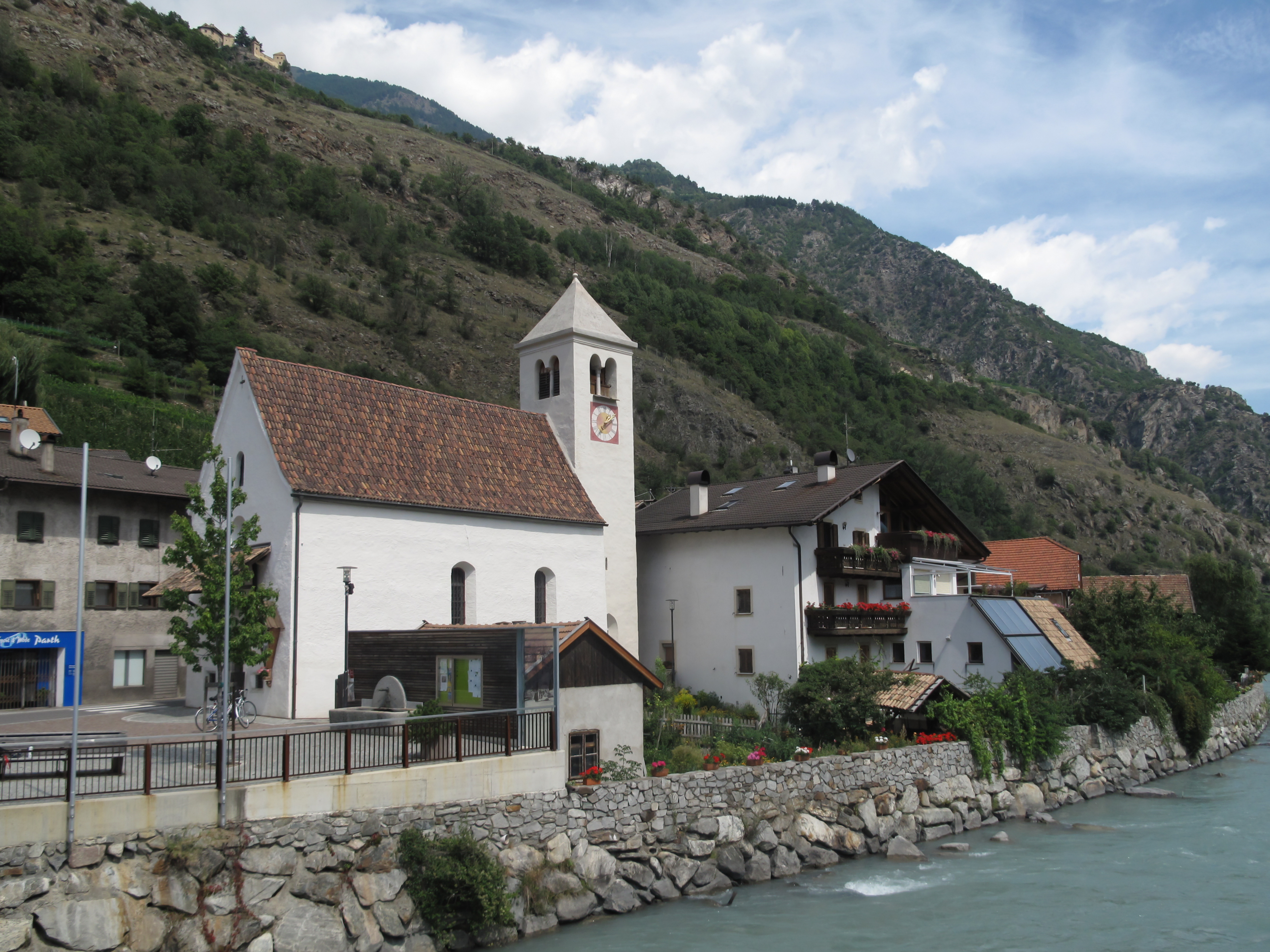
Liebfrauenkirche in Staben

== Twin towns and sister cities ==
- Axams in Austria
- Rhein-Pfalz-Kreis in Germany
