= Algund =

- Comune
- Gemeinde Algund; Comune di Lagundo
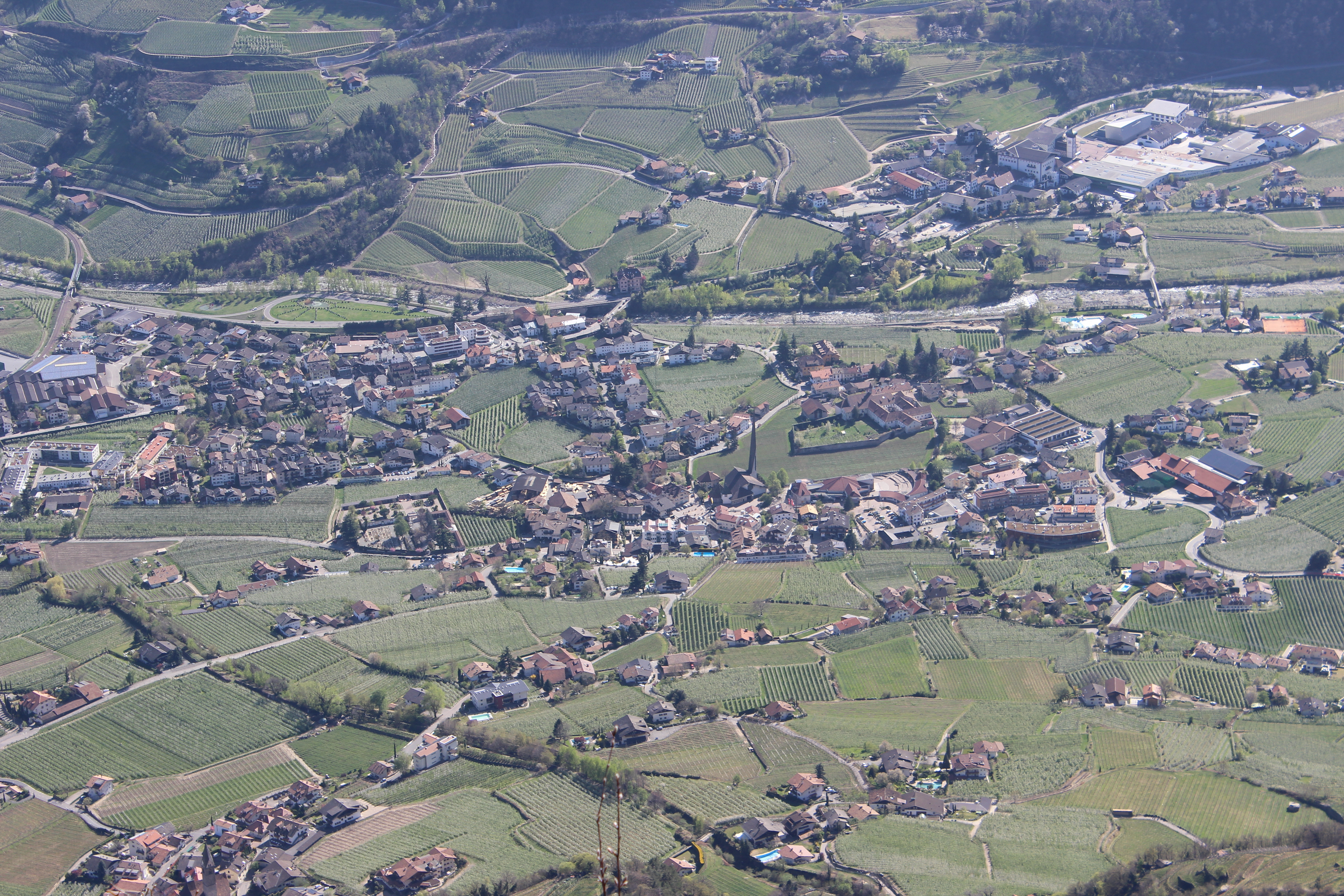
- View of Algund

- Location within Italy Location within Trentino-Alto Adige/Südtirol
- Coordinates: 46°41′N 11°8′E
- Country: Italy
- Region: Trentino-Alto Adige/Südtirol
- Province: South Tyrol (BZ)
- Frazioni: Aschbach (Riolagundo), Forst (Foresta), Mitterplars (Plars di Mezzo), Mühlbach (Riomolino), Oberplars (Plars di Sopra) and Vellau (Velloi)

Government
  - Mayor: Ulrich Gamper

Area
  - Total: 23.6 km^{2} (9.1 sq mi)

Population (31-12-2025)
  - Total: 5,075
  - Density: 215/km^{2} (557/sq mi)
- Demonyms: German: Algunder; Italian: lagundesi
- Time zone: UTC+1 (CET)
  - Summer (DST): UTC+2 (CEST)
- Postal code: 39022
- Dialing code: 0473
- Website: Official website

Algund (German pronunciation: [alˈgʊnt]; Italian: Lagundo [laˈɡundo]) is a comune (municipality) in South Tyrol in northern Italy, located about 25 kilometres (16 mi) northwest of Bolzano.

== Geography ==
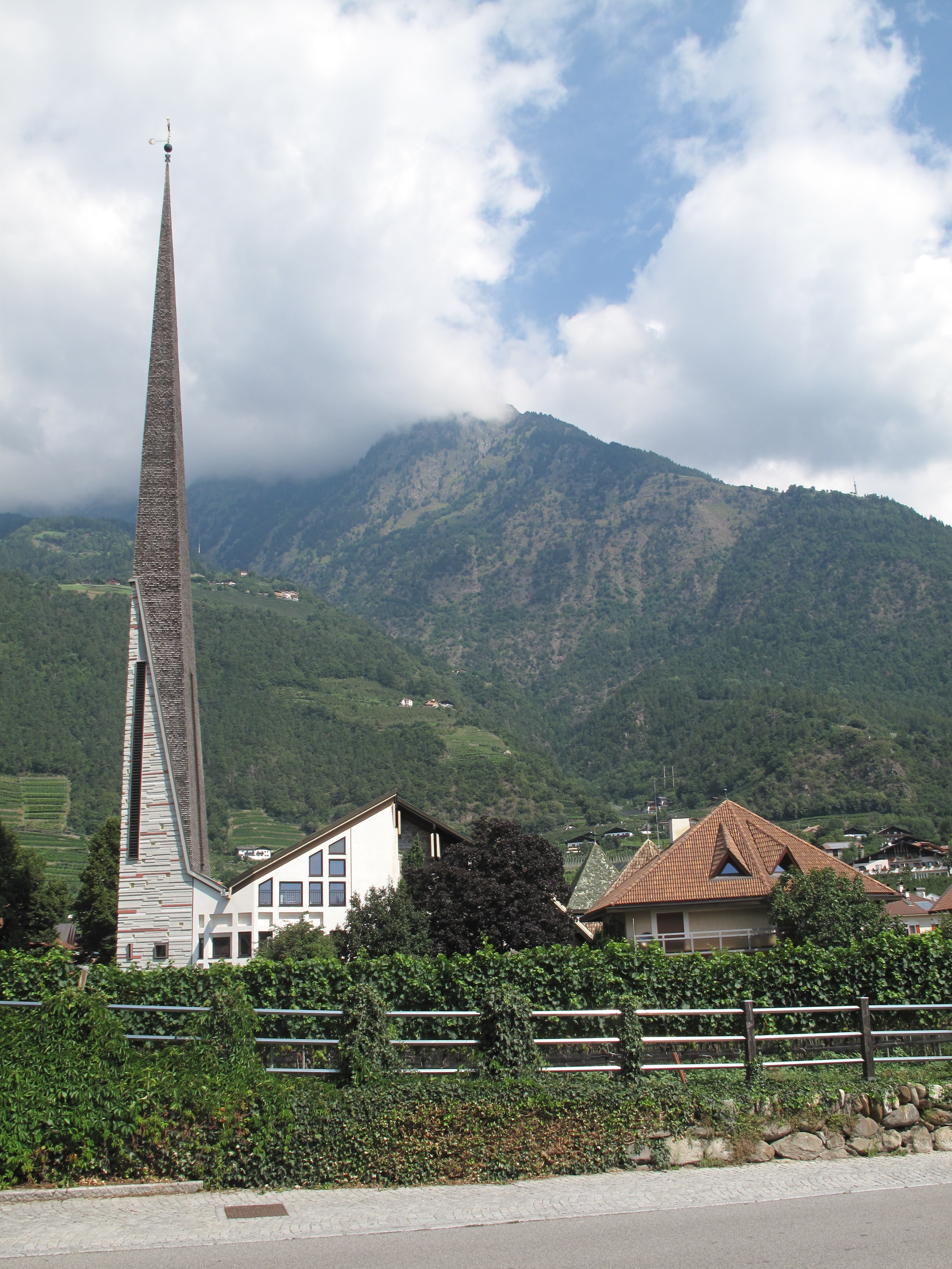
The new St Joseph's Church in Algund

As of 31 December 2015, it had a population of 5,029 and an area of 23.6 square kilometres (9.1 mi^{2}).

Algund borders the following municipalities: Lana, Marling, Merano, Naturns, Partschins, Plaus and Tirol.

=== Frazioni ===
The municipality contains the frazioni (subdivisions, mainly villages and hamlets) Aschbach (Riolagundo), Forst (Foresta), Mitterplars (Plars di Mezzo), Mühlbach (Riomolino), Oberplars (Plars di Sopra) and Vellau (Velloi).

== History ==
=== Place name ===
The name apud Algunde (Latin for close to Algund) appears for the first time in 994.

=== Coat-of-arms ===
The emblem is a barrel of wine, overhanged by a vine-shoot of black grapes, on or bordered by an argent and gules crown gear. The barrel and grapes symbolize the viticulture practiced in the area, the argent and gules indented frame represents the membership to the Tyrol. The emblem was adopted in 1970.

== Society ==
=== Linguistic distribution ===
According to the 2024 census, 82.75% of the population speak German, 16.90% Italian and 0.35% Ladin as first language.

Language	2001	2011	2024
German	86.81%	85.17%	82,75%
Italian	12.93%	14.58%	16.90%
Ladin	0.26%	0.25%	0.35%

=== Demographic evolution ===
Historical population

Year	Pop.	±%
1860	?	—
1870	?	—
1880	1,622	—
1900	?	—
1910	2,699	—

Year	Pop.	±%
1921	2,611	−3.3%
1931	3,068	+17.5%
1936	3,151	+2.7%
1951	3,151	+0.0%
1961	3,309	+5.0%

Year	Pop.	±%
1971	3,524	+6.5%
1981	3,631	+3.0%
1991	3,841	+5.8%
2001	4,169	+8.5%

Source: Data from ISTAT

- note: after 1921, the frazione Forst was switched from Marling to Algund.
