= Burggrafenamt =

Coordinates: 46.68°N 11.15°E

- District
- Comunità comprensoriale Burgraviato; Bezirksgemeinschaft Burggrafenamt
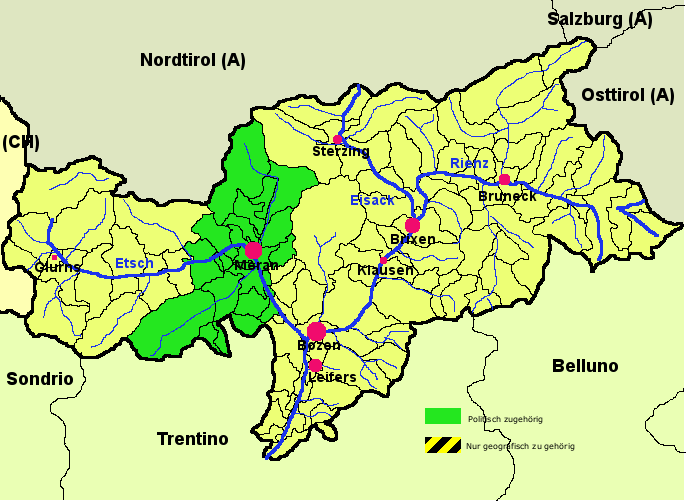
- Burggrafenamt (highlighted in green) within South Tyrol
- Country: Italy
- Autonomous region: Trentino-Alto Adige
- Autonomous province: South Tyrol
- Established: 1971
- Administrative seat: Merano (Meran)

Area
  - Total: 1,101 km^{2} (425 sq mi)

Population (2005)
  - Total: 92,631
  - Density: 84.13/km^{2} (217.9/sq mi)
- Website: www.bzgbga.it

The Burggrafenamt (Italian: Burgraviato [burɡraˈvjaːto], German: Burggrafenamt) is a district (Italian: comprensorio, German: Bezirksgemeinschaft) in the western part of the Italian province of South Tyrol. It comprises the part of the Adige river valley between Naturns and Bolzano, and its side valleys Passeier Valley and Ulten Valley.

== Overview ==
Originally part of the historic Vinschgau in the west, the name of the region is derived from the burgraves of Tyrol Castle. It is the nucleus of the medieval County of Tyrol with its capital Merano.

According to the 2001 census, 78.66% of the population of the valley speak German, 21.06% Italian and 0.28% Ladin as mother language.

== Subdivision ==
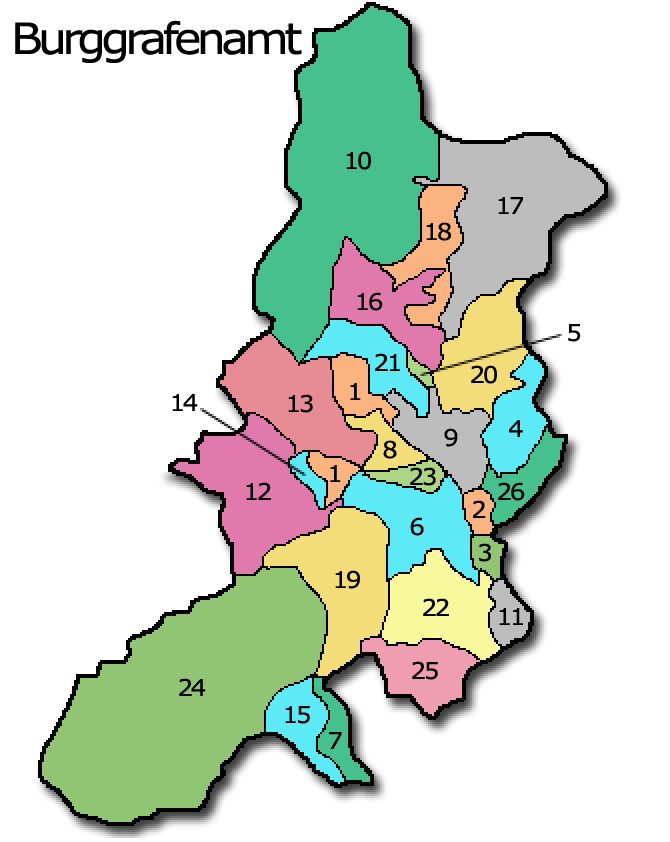
Municipalities of the Burggrafenamt district

The following municipalities are part of the Burggrafenamt district:

1. Algund
2. Burgstall
3. Gargazon
4. Hafling
5. Kuens
6. Lana
7. Laurein
8. Marling
9. Merano (district capital)
10. Moos in Passeier
11. Nals
12. Naturns
13. Partschins
14. Plaus
15. Proveis
16. Riffian
17. St. Leonhard in Passeier
18. St. Martin in Passeier
19. St. Pankraz
20. Schenna
21. Tirol
22. Tisens
23. Tscherms
24. Ulten
25. Unsere Liebe Frau im Walde-St. Felix
26. Vöran
