= Passiria =

Passiria may refer to:

- The Val Passiria or Passeier Valley in north-eastern Italy
  - The Passiria or Passeirer Gebirgsziege breed of goat from that valley
  - The comune of Moso in Passiria or Moos in Passeier in the valley
  - The comune of San Martino in Passiria or St. Martin in Passeier in the valley
  - The comune of San Leonardo in Passiria or St. Leonhard in Passeier in the valley
