= Lake Kummersee =

Lake in Italy

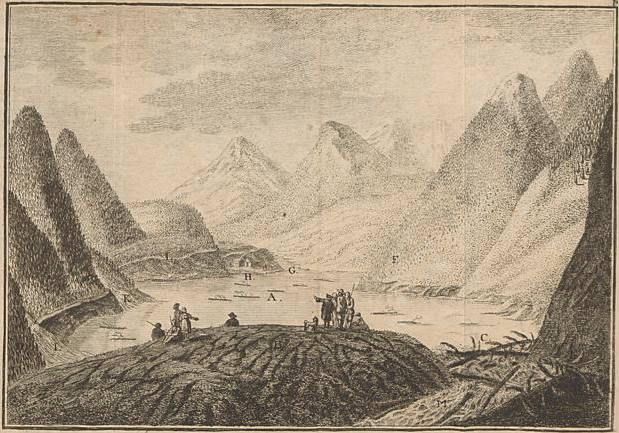
- Engraving from 1773 showing the Lake Kummersee.
- Interactive map of Lake Kummersee
- Location: Moos in Passeier, South Tyrol, Trentino-Alto Adige/Südtirol, Italy
- Coordinates: 46°51′26″N 11°09′14″E
- Primary inflows: Passer
- Primary outflows: Passer
- Max. length: 2 km (1.2 mi)
- Max. depth: 35 m (115 ft)

The Kummersee was a dammed lake located south of today's hamlet of Rabenstein (Corvara) in the municipality of Moos in Passeier and existed from 1401 to 1774.

== History ==
The lake was formed in 1401 as a result of a landslide of the Ganderberg, which led to the complete occlusion of the upper Passeier Valley and the damming of the Passer stream. The body of water probably reached a length of about 2 km and a depth of 35 m.

The earthen dam that bordered it is estimated to have had a volume of 3.5 million m³: it was unstable and tended to give way following heavy rains, producing disastrous floods along the valley that even reached the city of Merano. The lake's German name can be translated into English as “Lake of Sorrow” because of the major problems it caused. The dam caved in eight times, causing many floods.

List of Kummersee floods
September 22, 1419	September 14, 1503	September 30, 1512	May 21, 1572
June 18, 1721	September 17, 1772	September 9, 1773	October 28, 1774

The flood of 1419 was particularly disastrous for the city of Merano, destroying the Church of the Holy Spirit, the adjoining hospital, and bridges, as well as causing the deaths of more than 400 people.

After the penultimate catastrophic event in 1773, it was decided to create a drainage channel for the lake to prevent further damage. Engineer Walcher was commissioned with the work, but in 1774, when it was completed, perhaps due to a construction defect or due to an error on the part of the workmen, an unexpected and violent flooding happened, which dried up the lake completely and afterwards it did not reform again. The mass of water flowed down the valley and created, for the last time, problems and damage in the city of Merano.

Today, there are no visible signs of the Kummersee left, although the landslide area that spawned it is partly still active today. In local place names, the memory of the lake has remained in the name of a farm, the Seehof, that stood on its shores. In 2004, the municipality of Moos created a promenade that traces its shores.

== Bibliography ==
- Stefani, Martina; Mantovani, Matteo; Mair, Volkmar (2011). The Ganderberg landslide (South Tyrol, Italy): mitigation of residual risk by real time monitoring (PDF). Rome: The Secondo World Landslide Forum. Archived from the original (PDF) on 7 July 2016.
- Stampfer, P.C. (1889). Geschichte von Meran, der alten Hauptstadt des Landes Tirol, Innsbruck [History of Merano, the old capital of the province of Tyrol, Innsbruck] (in German). Sändig Reprint. ISBN 9783253030390.
