= Falschauer =

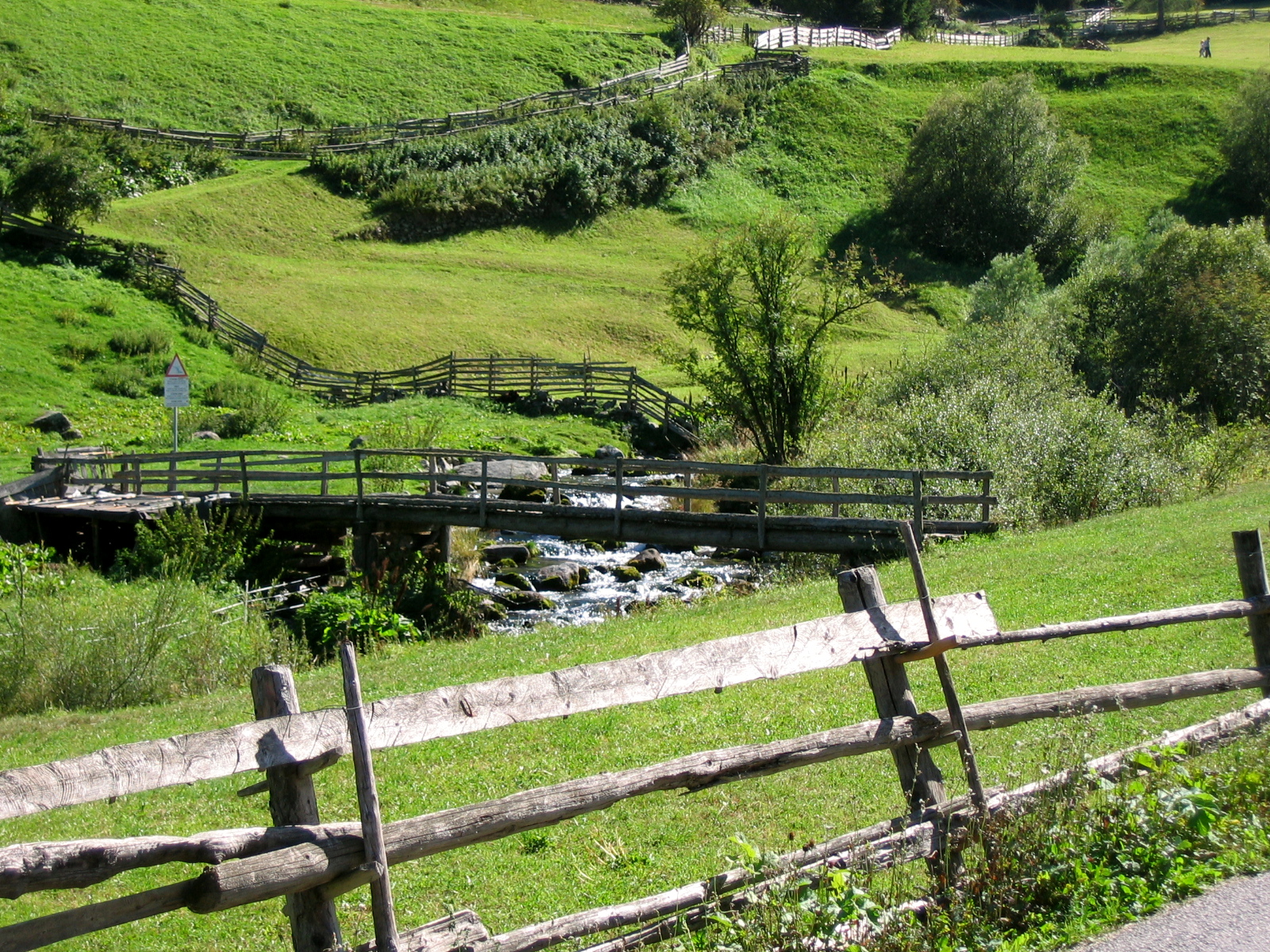

Location
- Country: Italy

Physical characteristics
- Source
  - location: Ultental (South Tyrol)
- Mouth: Adige
  - coordinates: 46.6173°N 11.1841°E
- Length: 41.4 km (25.7 mi)
- Basin size: 301 km^{2} (116 sq mi)

Basin features
- Progression: Adige→ Adriatic Sea

The Falschauer (Italian: Valsura; German: Falschauer) is a river in South Tyrol, Italy. It flows into the Adige near Lana.
