= History of Tyrol =

Regional history in Central Europe

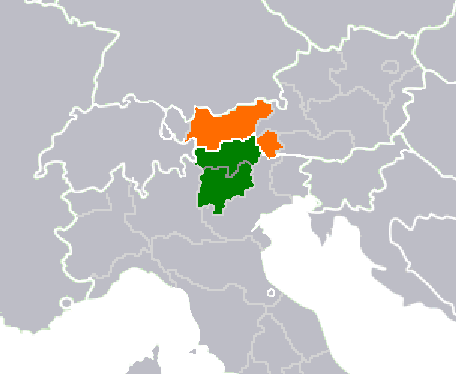
Tyrol–South Tyrol–Trentino Euroregion

The history of Tyrol, a historical region in the middle alpine area of Central Europe, dates back to early human settlements at the end of the last glacier period, around 12,000 BC. Sedentary settlements of farmers and herders can be traced back to 5000 BC. Many of the main and side valleys were settled during the early Bronze Age, from 1800 to 1300 BC. From these settlements, two prominent cultures emerged: the Laugen-Melaun culture in the Bronze Age, and the Fritzens-Sanzeno culture in the Iron Age.

The region, inhabited during the Iron Age by the Alpine population of the Raeti, was conquered by the Romans in 15 BC. The northern and eastern areas were incorporated into the Roman Empire as the provinces of Raetia and Noricum, leaving deep impressions on the culture and language, with the Rhaeto-Romance languages. Following the conquest of Italy by the Goths, Tyrol became part of the Ostrogothic Kingdom in the fifth and sixth centuries. In 553, southern Tyrol was incorporated into the Lombards' Kingdom of Italy, northern Tyrol came under the influence of the Bavarii, and western Tyrol became part of Alamannia—the three areas meeting at present-day Bolzano.

In 774, Charlemagne conquered the Lombards, and as a consequence, Tyrol became an important bridgehead to Italy. In the eleventh century, the Emperors of the Holy Roman Empire granted the counties of Trento, Bolzano, and Vinschgau to the Bishopric of Trent, and the county of Norital and Puster Valley to the Bishopric of Brixen—effectually placing the region under the control of the Emperors.

In the coming centuries, the counts residing in Tirol Castle near Merano extended their territory over the region. Later counts would hold much of their territory directly from the Holy Roman Emperor. The Meinhardinger family, originating in Gorizia, controlled the Tyrol, Gorizia, and the Duchy of Carinthia. By 1295, the "county and reign of Tyrol" had established itself firmly in the "Land on the Adige and Inn", as the region was then called. When the Meinhardiner dynasty died out in 1369, the Tyrol was ceded to the House of Habsburg, who ruled over the region for the next five and a half centuries, with a brief period of control in the early nineteenth century by the Bavarians during the Napoleonic Wars.

At the conclusion of World War I, the Treaty of Saint-Germain-en-Laye of 1919 ceded the southern part of Tyrol to the Kingdom of Italy, including present-day South Tyrol, with its large German-speaking majority. The northern part of Tyrol was retained by the First Austrian Republic. The historical region is formed by the present-day Austrian State of Tyrol and the Italian provinces of South Tyrol and Trentino. The boundaries of this Tyrol–South Tyrol–Trentino Euroregion correspond to the former Habsburg County of Tyrol, which gave this historical region its name.

== Prehistory ==
Archaeological findings show people settled in the middle alpine region, later to be called Tyrol, when the glaciers retreated and flora and fauna revived, after the last ice age ended around 12,000 BC. Artifacts found on the Seiser Alm date to the Upper Paleolithic era. In the valley bottoms near Bolzano, Brixen and Salorno, mesolithic hunters resting places were discovered. Stone artefacts recovered there were dated to the 8th millennia BC. Discovery of Ötzi on the Similaun glacier in 1991 proved man had already crossed the highest Alpine passes 5000 years ago. Sedentary settlements of farmers and herders can be traced back to 5000 BC. There is ample evidence of settlements in the main and side valleys during the early and middle Bronze Age (1800-1300 BC). Preferred settlement sites were sunny terraces on the valleys slopes, and hill tops in the middle heights.

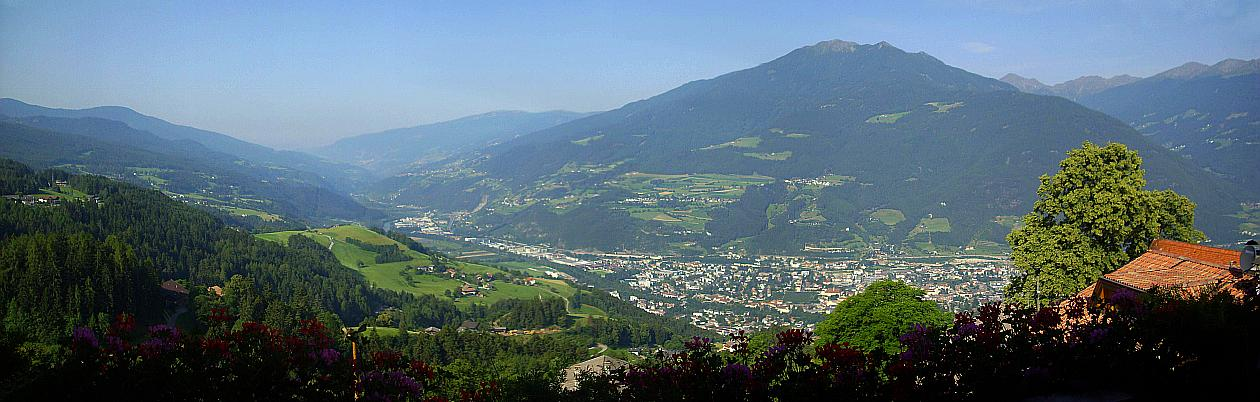
View from south to the city of Brixen and the Eisacktal

In the Bronze and Iron Ages the region was home to a series of autochthonous cultures occupying roughly the area of the later county of Tyrol. The most prominent are the late Bronze Age Laugen-Melaun culture and Iron Age Fritzens-Sanzeno culture.

The Laugen-Melaun culture, named after two important archaeological sites near the modern-day town of Brixen in South Tyrol, originated in the 14th century BC, in the area of today's South Tyrol and Trentino. It soon spread over the central area of the Southern Alps, encompassing South and East Tyrol, Trentino north of Rovereto and the Lower Engadine; the northern part of Tyrol came under the influence of the Urnfield culture. Distinguishing factors include its characteristic richly decorated pottery, while the metal-working is strongly influenced by adjacent cultures. As in the Urnfield culture, Laugen-Melaun-people cremated their dead, placing their ashes in urns, and worshipping their gods in sanctuaries sometimes situated in remote areas, on mountain-tops or close to water. Rich burial objects show that from the 13th to 11th century BC, the Laugen-Melaun culture (Laugen-Melaun A) flourished, due to the mining of copper, the source material for the alloy bronze.

Around 500 BC, the Fritzens-Sanzeno culture, also known as culture of the Raeti, after the goddess Raetia who according to Roman authors was the main deity of the people inhabiting the region, succeeded both the Laugen-Melaun culture of the southern and the Urnfield culture of the northern part of Tyrol. As in the preceding culture, the richly ornamented pottery is very characteristic, while many aspects such as the metal-working, burial customs and religion are strongly influenced by its neighbours, primarily the Etruscans and Celts. Nonetheless, the Fritzens-Sanzeno-people possessed important distinct cultural traits distinguishing them from adjacent groups, such as the typical mountain-sanctuaries already in use during the time of the Laugen-Melaun culture, certain types of fibulae, bronze armor, and their own alphabet derived from one of North Etruscan alphabets (but not from the Etruscan alphabet). The language of the Raeti was kin to Etruscan, but different enough to suggest a very ancient divergence between them.

== Antiquity ==
In 15 BC, the region was conquered by the Romans, and its northern and eastern part incorporated into the Roman Empire as the provinces of Raetia and Noricum respectively. The part south of and including the area around the modern day cities of Bolzano and Merano became part of Italia's Regio X. As in the rest of Europe, the Roman era left deep impressions on the culture and language, with the Rhaeto-Romance languages.

== Middle Ages ==
After the conquest of Italy by the Goths, Tyrol became part of the Ostrogothic Kingdom from the 5th to the 6th century. After the fall of the Ostrogothic Kingdom in 553, the Germanic tribe of the Lombards invaded Italy and founded the Lombard Kingdom of Italy, which no longer included all of Tyrol, only its southern part. The northern part of Tyrol came under the influence of the Bavarii, while the west probably was part of Alamannia. Thus, Tyrol was divided among three spheres of influence that met in the approximate area of today's Bolzano. During the 6th century Bavaria and Alamannia became stem duchies of the Frankish Kingdom. On conquering the Lombard Kingdom of Italy in 774, Charlemagne had himself crowned King of the Lombards. Consequently, Tyrol came to be of great importance as a bridgehead to Italy, which was re-affirmed during the Italian Campaign of Otto I. In the years 1007 and 1027 the Emperors of the Holy Roman Empire granted the counties of Trento, Bolzano and Vinschgau to the Bishopric of Trent. In 1027 the County of Norital was granted to the Bishopric of Brixen, followed in 1091 by the County of Puster Valley. Since the Bishops were nominated directly by the Emperor and their office was not hereditary, putting the area under their control was intended to secure it to the Emperors.

== Birth of the County of Tyrol ==
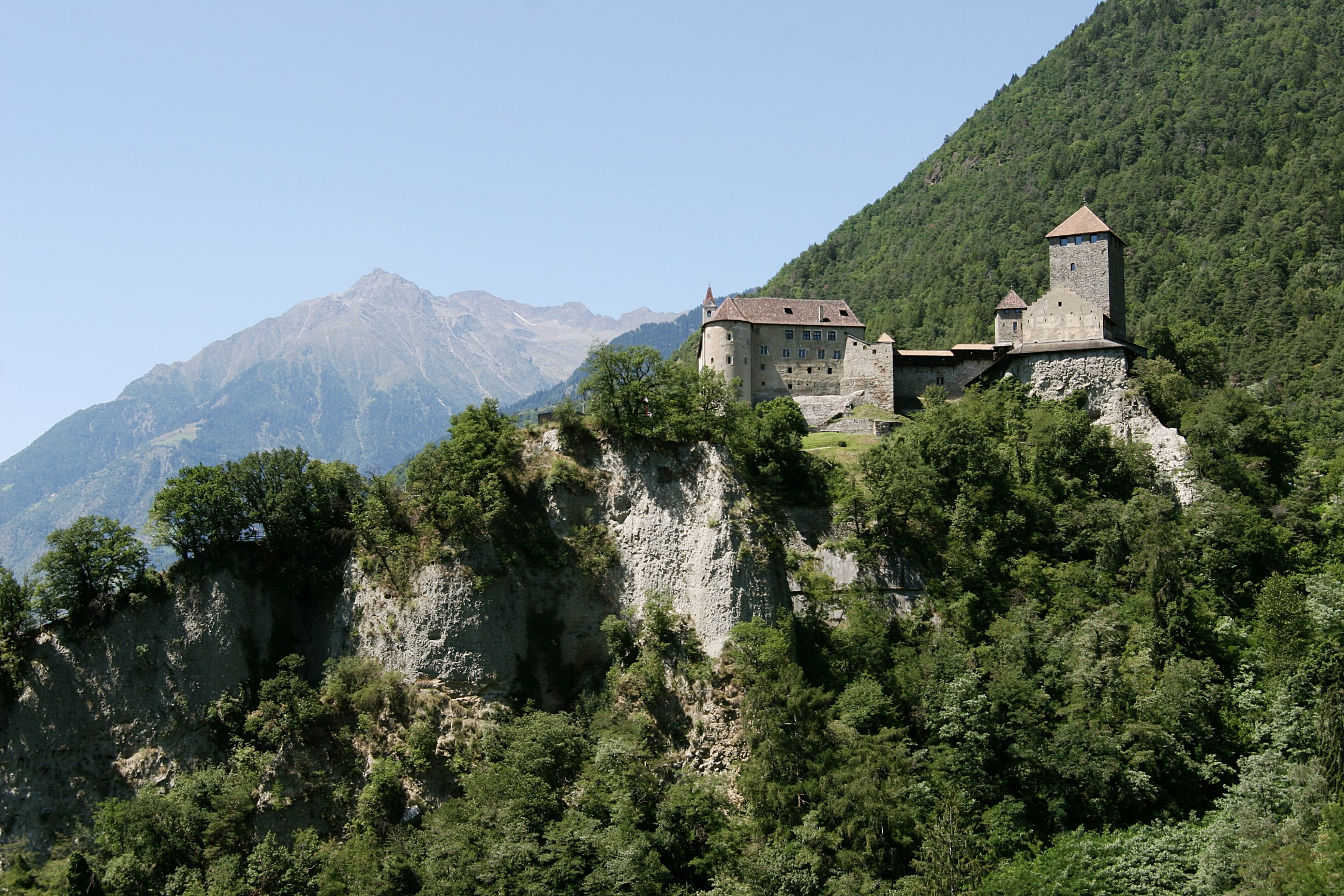
Castle Tyrol was the seat of the Counts of Tyrol and gave the region its name

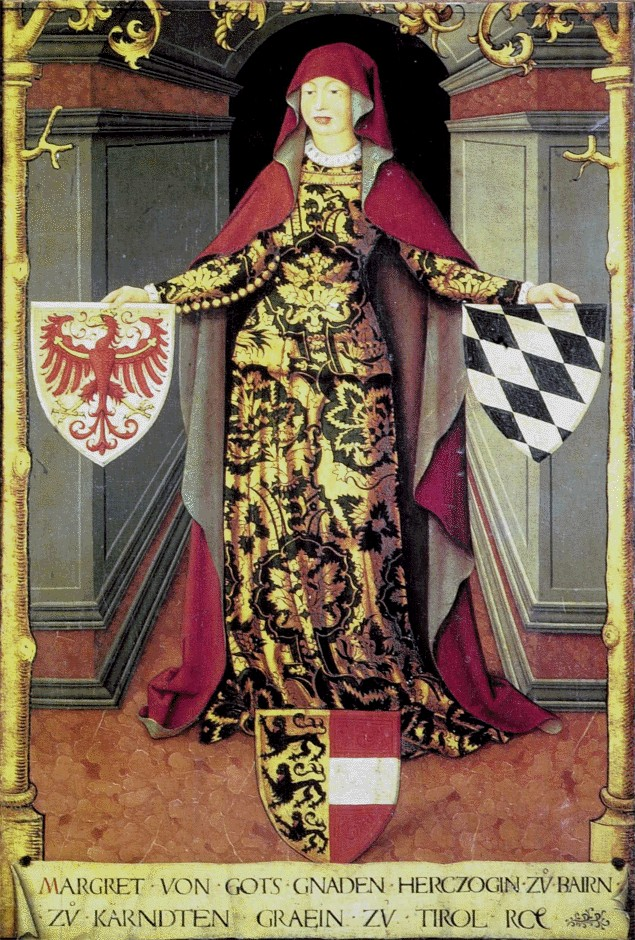
Margaret, Countess of Tyrol

Over the centuries, the Counts residing in Tirol Castle, near Merano, extended their territory over the region. Later counts would hold much of their territory directly from the Holy Roman Emperor. The Meinhardinger family, originating in Gorizia, held not only Tyrol and Gorizia, but for a time the Duchy of Carinthia. At the end of count Meinhard II's rule (1259–1295) the "county and reign of Tyrol" had established itself firmly in the "Land on the Adige and Inn", as the region was then called. This happened on the expense of the power of the bishops, who were nominally the feudal lords of the counts of Tyrol. Meinhard II also introduced more efficient systems for the administration of his territories.

Margarete "Maultasch" was the last effective ruler of Tyrol from the Meinhardinger Dynasty. In 1330 she was married to John-Henry (who later became the margrave of Moravia), who she repudiated with the help of the Tyrolean aristocracy in order to marry Duke Ludwig V of Bavaria, a member of the powerful Wittelsbach dynasty. This weakened the position of the countess and strengthened the local nobility. The only son of Margarete and Louis, Meinhard, died in 1363, two years after his father, leaving the countess without an heir.

Margarete Maultasch decided to bequeath Tyrol to Duke Rudolph IV of the House of Habsburg, probably pressed by the aristocracy, an act which caused a conflict between Meinhard's uncle Stephen II, who forged an alliance with the powerful Lord of Milan Bernabò Visconti to invade Tyrol, and the House of Habsburg. Stephen finally renounced Tyrol to the Habsburgs with the Peace of Schärding for a huge financial compensation after the death of Margarete Maultasch in 1369. The red eagle in Tyrol's coat of arms derives from the red Brandenburg eagle, dating from the time when Louis V and Margarete Maultasch governed Brandenburg as well.

== Habsburg rule ==
The acquisition of Tyrol was strategically important to the Habsburg dynasty, since it allowed it to connect their Austrian territories with their territorial possessions in the area of today's Switzerland. From that time, Tyrol was ruled by various lines of the Habsburg family, who bore the title Count. Tyrol repeatedly became involved in the political and military conflicts of the Habsburgs with Milan, Venice, Switzerland and the County of Gorizia, as well as Bavaria and Swabia.

The Battle of Sempach in 1386, in which Duke Leopold III of Austria was defeated by the Old Swiss Confederacy had important repercussions on Tyrol, and was the first of a series of military conflicts between the county and its neighbours. The 1405-1408 war against the Swiss Appenzeller, 1413 the conflict with Venice and 1410 the invasion of the lower Inn valley by the Bavarians. In 1423, during the rule of Frederick IV "Empty Pockets", the first meeting that could be called a Tyrolean Parliament met. It consisted of aristocrats, bourgeois and even peasant representatives. During Frederick IV's tenure internal conflicts between the powerful local aristocracy and the duke arose, which eventually led to the decline of the nobles and of their traditional system of values, and strengthened the duke's rule over the country. This enabled Sigismund "Rich in Coin" to continue his father's rule to the end of the 15th century and lead the county into the modern era.

Sigismund's opulent lifestyle and the misfortunes of war with Venice bled the treasury, leading to his decision to mortgage the Tyrolean silver mines. By 1490, Sigismund became so unpopular that he was forced to abdicate in favor of his more prosperous cousin, Maximilian, King of the Germans. Three years after the succession, Maximilian became Holy Roman Emperor, making his preferred residence, Innsbruck, the imperial capitol. Maximilian added Kufstein, Rattenberg and Kitzbühel to Tyrol, and when he inherited the Puster Valley and East Tyrol the borders of Tyrol were set, with the exception of the 1817 addition of the Ziller Valley

== Napoleonic Wars ==
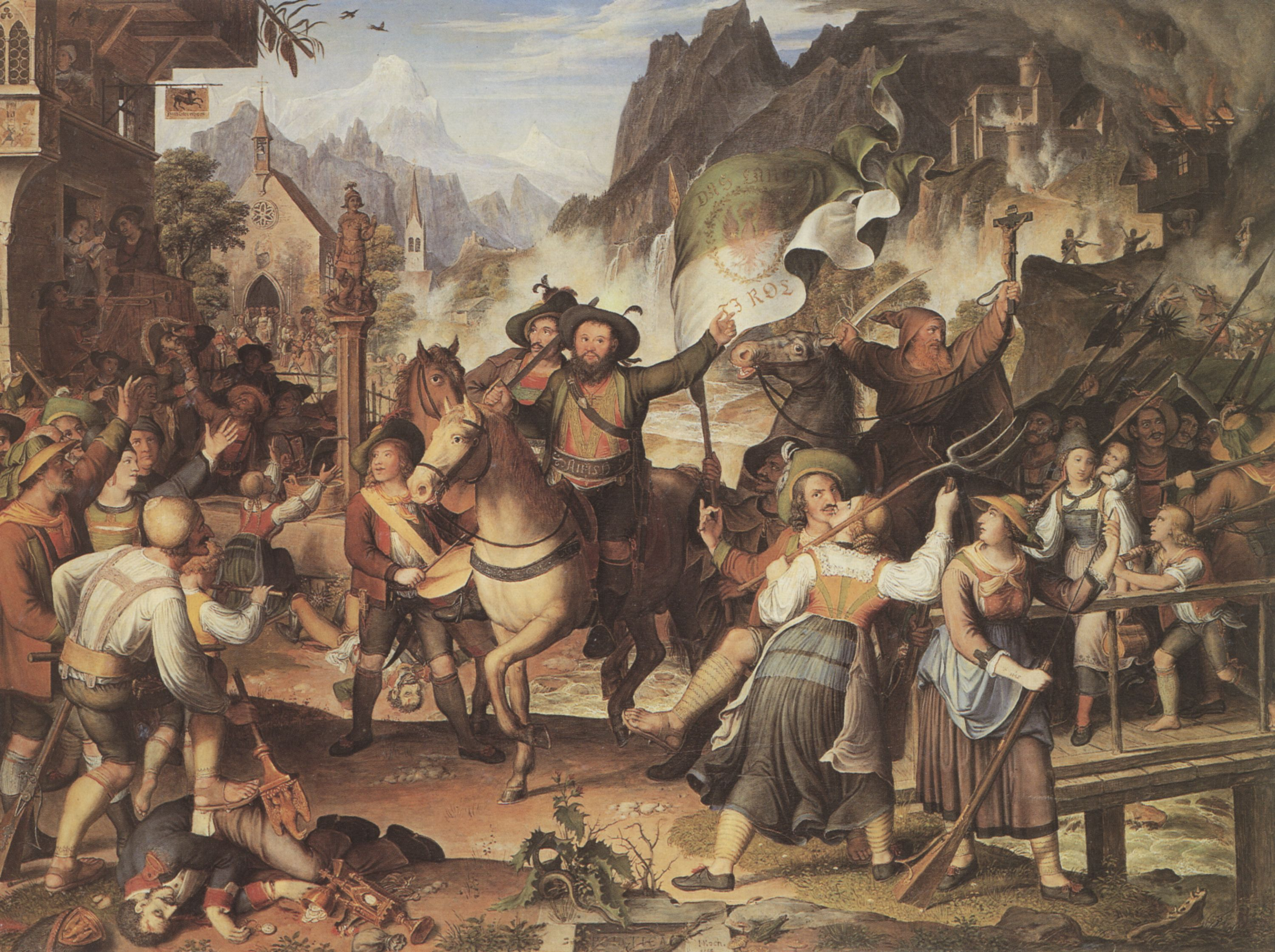
Andreas Hofer led the Tyrolean Rebellion 1809 against the invading Napoleon I

Following defeat by Napoleon in 1805, Austria was forced to cede Tyrol to the Kingdom of Bavaria in the Peace of Pressburg. Tyrol, as a part of Bavaria, became a member of the Confederation of the Rhine in 1806. Consequently, King Maximilian I of Bavaria introduced far reaching economic, religious and administrative reforms. When in 1808 a new constitution for the Kingdom of Bavaria was introduced, Tyrol was integrated into South Bavaria, and divided into three districts, losing its special status in the kingdom. Furthermore, Tyroleans were now subjected to the Bavarian conscription levies, and faced the prospect of having to fight against Austrian troops. This, together with the economic decline under Bavarian rule, and the kingdom's religious reforms which were opposed by the Catholic population, led to a growing conflict between the Tyrolean population and the Bavarian authorities.

In 1806, delegates from Tyrol travelled to Vienna to make plans for an insurrection of the Tyrolean people. Among them was the later leader of the insurgents, Andreas Hofer. The insurrection began on April 9, 1809, in Innsbruck. On April 12, 1809, Innsbruck was freed by the Tyrolean "Landsturm" commanded by captain Martin Teimer in the battle later known as the First battle of the Bergisel. One day later a military unit of 8000 men consisting of Bavarian and French Troops approached Innsbruck from the Brenner Pass, but was convinced to surrender by captain Teimer, who dressed up as a Major of the regular Austrian army and made the Bavarian officers believe that the Austrian army was approaching Innsbruck, when in fact it was still about 40 miles away. In order to convalidate the capitulation agreement, Teimer was subsequently appointed Major of the Austrian army. Throughout Tyrol, the Bavarian troops were killed or driven out. The Tyroleans fought mainly as skirmishing sharpshooters, taking advantage of the mountainous nature of the land. They were highly mobile and made use of artificial avalanches to combat their enemies. Following the defeat of the Austrian Army on the Bavarian front, Napoleon dispatched Charles Lefebvre to Tyrol, and by May 19 Innsbruck had been seized again and the rebellion seemed quelled.

After Archduke Karl's Austrian army was defeated by Napoleon at the Battle of Wagram, the Armistice of Znaim was signed. Point IV of the agreement stated that Austria was to withdraw its troops from the territories of Vorarlberg and Tyrol, returning them to Bavarian rule. But the Bavarians and the French found it difficult to gain control of the territory, with Tyrolean sharpshooters occupying high places along the roads, blocking roads and setting off avalanches to harm the occupying army. The Tyroleans managed to hold off and inflict heavy casualties on the French and Bavarian troops, and on August 13 the Tyrolean peasant army rallied at the Bergisel again for the decisive Battle. Fifteen thousand Bavarian, French and Saxon troops faced almost the same number of Tyrolean irregulars. Surrounded on all sides by the irregulars, and having sustained heavy casualties, Lefebvre was forced to withdraw. Andreas Hofer, who in the meantime had advanced to supreme commander of the insurgents, became regent of Tyrol in the name of the Emperor.

Following the Treaty of Schönbrunn Tyrol was again ceded to Bavaria by the Austrian Emperor. On October 21 Bavarian, French and Italian troops under the command of Jean-Baptiste Drouet, Comte d'Erlon poured into Tyrol, forcing the Tyroleans to retreat to the Bergisel again. As Winter approached, supplies began to dwindle, and many men left to return to their homes. On 28/29 October, news of the peace treaty that had been signed by Austria reached Tyrol. This had catastrophic effects on the morale of the Tyroleans, and Andreas Hofer, betrayed by his emperor, resorted to drinking. The Tyrolean morale had been broken. On November 1 Drouet d'Erlon had recaptured Innsbruck and the Bergisel, and by 11 November 1809, Tyrol was entirely occupied. Hofer fled into the mountains, and on 5 January 1810 he was betrayed and denounced to the authorities. On 28 January, he, his wife and his son were taken to Bolzano. Napoleon learnt of the capture at the start of February and ordered Hofer to be tried and executed. This order was acted upon soon and Hofer died at the dungeon of the fortress of Mantua on February 20, 1810.

The execution of Hofer, considered a Tyrolean hero until today, is the topic of the song Zu Mantua in Banden, since 1948 the Tyrol's official anthem.

== Crownland of Tyrol ==
Tyrol remained divided under Bavarian and Italian authority for another four years, before its reunification and return to Austria following the decisions at the Congress of Vienna in 1814. Integrated into the Austrian Empire, from 1867 onwards, it was a Kronland (Crown Land) of Cisleithania, the western half of Austria-Hungary.

== World War I ==
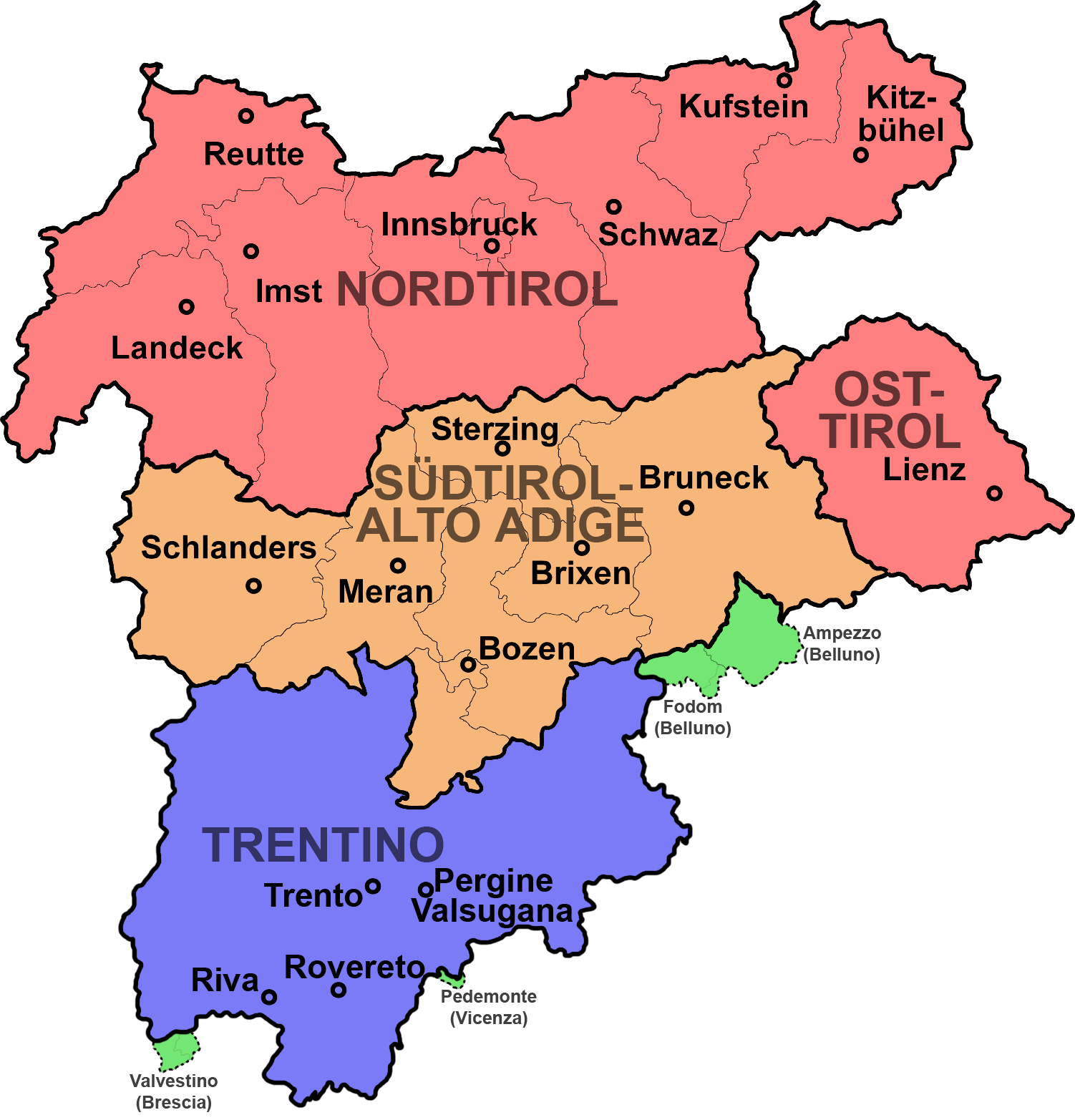
The former Tyrol today State of Tyrol ( Austria) Province of South Tyrol ( Italy) Province of Trentino ( Italy) Parts of the former county now within other Italian provinces

On the eve of World War I, the southern part of the Austrian crown land of Tyrol was populated mainly by Italian speakers (the so-called Welschtirol, or Trentino). Its border coincided with the present-day border between South Tyrol and Trentino, crossing the Adige valley at Salorno (Chiusa di Salorno/Salurner Klause). The existence of areas largely populated by Italian-speaking populations under the rule of the Austrian Empire was a constant cause of friction between Austria and Italy, a national state set on the unification of all Italians. Being part of the Triple Alliance with Germany and Austria was "an embarrassment, if not a contradiction" for Italy. Italy's fear that it would not get what it wanted in the event of a victorious Triple Alliance caused it to remain neutral during the first year of the war, and the preoccupation that it wouldn't get what it wanted from a victorious Entente either if it remained neutral led it to join the war on the side of the latter. Italy conducted intense negotiations with Austria, which was prepared to part with Trentino in exchange of Italy's neutrality, but Italy wanted (among other things) to reach the Alpine water divide, which it claimed as its 'natural border', a demand which Austria refused, since it would have meant giving up a territory regarded as personal fief by the Habsburg Emperors. On 26 April 1915, Italy signed the Treaty of London, agreeing to declare war against the Central Powers in exchange for the unredeemed territories of Trentino, Gorizia, Trieste and Dalmatia, as well as the part of German Tyrol south of the main Alpine divide. Apart from these territorial gains the alliance change enabled Italy to realise its aspiration: Italian military dominance in the Mediterranean. The ideals of irredentism were used to convince the population of the necessity of the war, but the true motive of the political leadership to join the war was their idea that Italy should become a great European power.

War against the Austro-Hungarian Empire was declared May 24, 1915. This put Tyrol on the front line, which passed through some of the highest mountains in the Alps. The ensuing front became known as the "War in ice and snow", as troops occupied the highest mountains and glaciers all year long. One hundred and twenty metres (390 feet) of snow were common during the winter of 1915–16, and tens of thousands of soldiers disappeared in avalanches. The remains of these soldiers are still being uncovered today. The Italian Alpini, their Austrian counterparts (Kaiserjäger, Standschützen and Landesschützen), and the German Alpenkorps occupied every hill and mountain top. They began carving extensive fortifications and military quarters, even drilling tunnels inside the mountains and deep into glaciers, like at Marmolada. Hundreds of troops would drag guns over mountains up to 3,890 m (12,760 ft). Streets, cable cars, mountain railways and walkways through the steepest of walls were built. The first to occupy higher ground became almost impossible to dislodge, so both sides turned to drilling tunnels under mountain peaks, filling them up with explosives, then detonating the entire mountain, including its defenders, such as Col di Lana, Monte Pasubio, Lagazuoi, etc. Climbing and skiing became essential skills for the troops of both sides and soon Ski Battalions and Special Climbing units were formed.

On May 15, 1916, the Austrian army staged an attack from the Trentino, unaided by the German army, whose command had advised against such a move. Several divisions were withdrawn from the Russian front to achieve necessary troop strength. The offensive was of limited tactical success. Austrians penetrated twelve miles into Italian territory, inflicting heavy casualties on the Italians, but fell short of their strategic and political goals. This inconclusive attack weakened the eastern front, which enabled the Russian Army to overrun Austrian positions in Galicia and threaten the heart of the Habsburg Empire

=== The armistice ===
After the Battle of Asiago in 1916, which ended in a stalemate and brought only minor territorial gains to Austria, the Tyrolean frontline remained largely static. The main battles were fought elsewhere. This changed in October, 1918, with Austro-Hungarian defeat in the Battle of Vittorio Veneto, the Imperial army collapsed and started to withdraw and, on 29 October, the Austro-Hungarians asked for an armistice. On 30 October 1918, the Austro-Hungarian army was split in two. The armistice was signed at 3.20 p.m., November 3, to become effective 24 hours later, at 3.00 p.m., November 4. Following the signing of the armistice, Austrian General Weber informed his Italian counterparts that the Imperial army had already laid down its weapons, due to a previous order and requested combat and Italian advancement to cease. The Italian General Pietro Badoglio sharply rejected the proposal, and threatened to stop all negotiations and continue the war. General Weber repeated the request, with no results. Even before the order to cease hostilities, the Imperial Army had already started to collapse, ceasing to exist as a combat force. Italian troops continued their advance until 3.00 p.m. on November 4. The occupation of all Tyrol, including Innsbruck, was completed in the days that followed.

Under the terms of the Austrian-Italian Armistice of Villa Giusti, as well as being required to evacuate all territory occupied since August, Austria-Hungary's forces were required to withdraw from South Tyrol, Tarvisio, the Isonzo valley, Gorizia, Trieste, Istria, western Carniola, and Dalmatia. Terms mandated German forces expulsion from Austria-Hungary within 15 days or their internment, and the Allies were to have free use of Austria-Hungary's internal communications. They were also obliged to allow Entente armies' transit, to reach Germany from the South.

The Italian General Rodolfo Graziani's 11th Italian army continued to advance, supported on the right by the 9th army. The result was that Austria-Hungary lost about 30,000 casualties and between 300,000 and 500,000 prisoners (50,000 by 31 October, 100,000 by 1 November and 428,000 by 4 November). Italian losses numbered about 38,000, including 145 French and 374 Britons.

It appears that the large quantity of prisoners stemmed from the Austrian command decision that captivity in Italy was preferable to starvation at home. After the armistice, hundreds of thousands of Austrian soldiers without weapons, food and discipline made their way home through the alpine valleys. The alpine villages were caught between the retreating, half-starved soldiers who repeatedly resorted to theft and robbery to survive, and the advancing Italian army. At the same time, great numbers of Italian war prisoners were making their way south towards their homeland. Austria did not have the means to guarantee the orderly retreat of its own army or the organized return of Italian war prisoners. In the meantime, Italian occupation of Tyrol was going as planned. On 11 November, Italian troops occupied the Brenner Pass and the Pass at Toblach. To secure access to the Inn valley, crucial for an advance into southern Germany, Innsbruck, capital of Tyrol, and the village Landeck were occupied as well. On 10 January 1919, the commander of the 3rd army corps, Gen. Ugo Sani, was appointed military governor of northern Tyrol with residence in Innsbruck.

== After World War I ==
The Treaty of Saint-Germain-en-Laye of 1919 ruled that, according to the Treaty of London, the southern part of Tyrol had to be ceded to the Kingdom of Italy. Italy's border was pushed northward to the strategically important Alpine water divide, including present-day South Tyrol with its large German-speaking majority. The northern part of Tyrol was retained by the First Austrian Republic.

In 1921 a plebiscite in Tyrol a majority of 98.77% voted for a unification with Germany. As a result of Germany's annexation of Austria in 1938, Austria, including Tyrol State, was incorporated into Nazi Germany.

In 1923, towns of Buchenstein, Hayden and Verseil were transferred from Province of Bolzano to Province of Belluno. Also, Hastachtal (includes former municipality of Casotto) was transferred from Province of Trento to Province of Vicenza in 1929, and towns of Magasa and Valvestino were transferred from Province of Trento to Province of Brescia in 1934.

== See also ==
- Tyrol
- Tyrol–South Tyrol–Trentino Euroregion
- Tyrol (state)
- History of South Tyrol
- Trentino-Alto Adige/Südtirol
- Haymon
