= Karl Zuegg =

Italian entrepreneur

Karl Zuegg (28 February 1914 – 26 December 2005) was an Italian entrepreneur from Lana in South Tyrol. He was the managing director of the Lana fruit juice and jam company Zuegg, between 1940 and 1986.

== Honors ==
- Order of Merit for Labour (1992)
