= Tyrol Castle =

Medieval castle in Tirol, northern Italy

Tirol Castle
- Tirol, South Tyrol, Italy
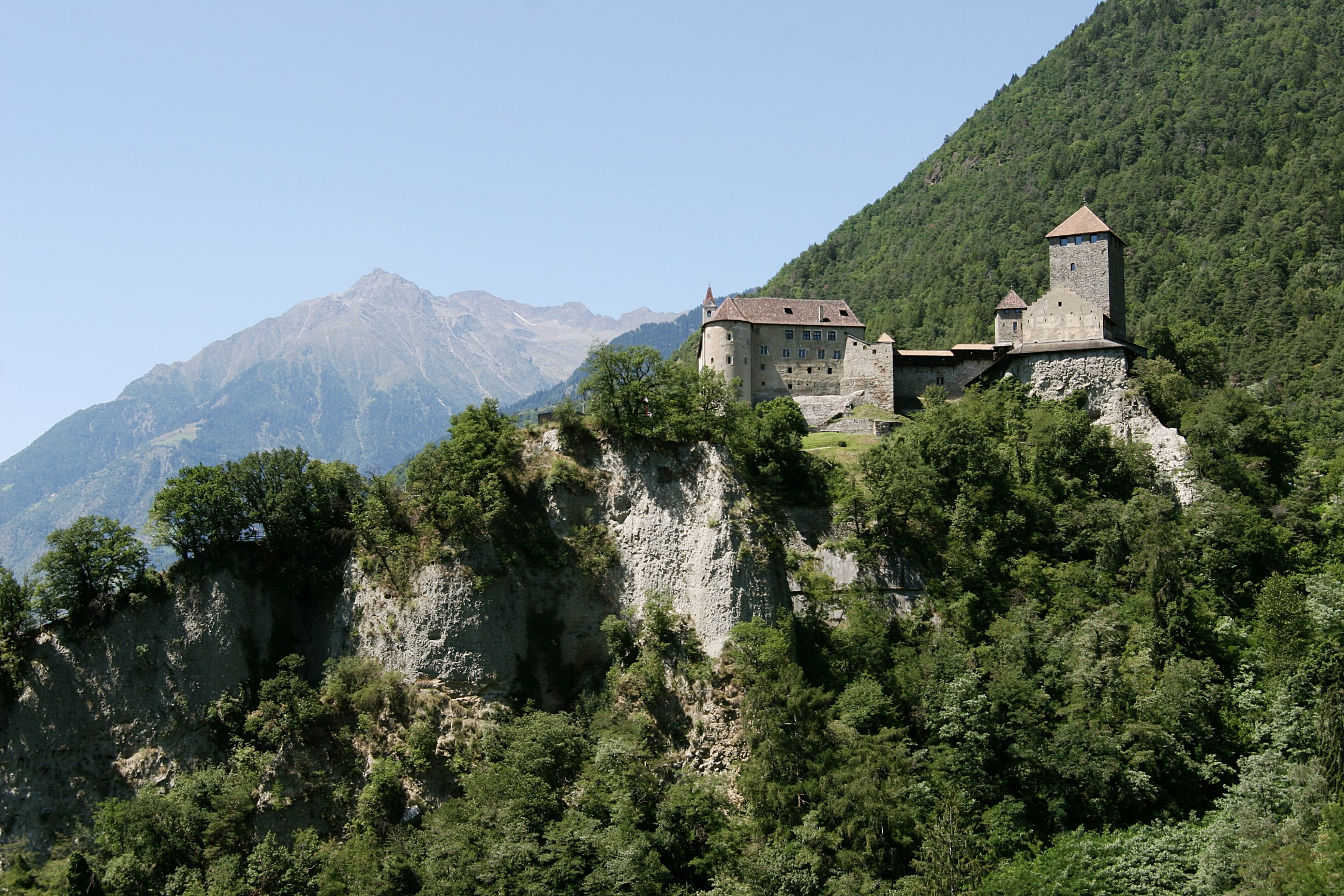
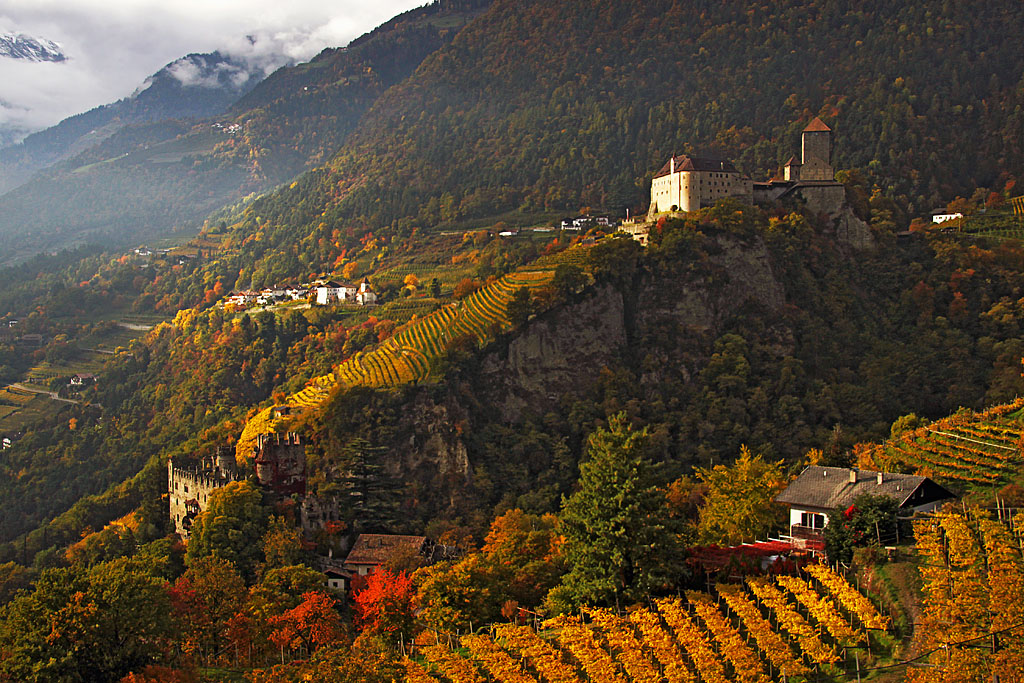
- View from Tirol village

Site information
- Condition: Preserved

Location
- Coordinates: 46°41′38.9″N 11°8′41.3″E

Site history
- Built: Before 1100
- Built by: Counts of Tyrol

Tyrol Castle, less commonly Tirol Castle (German: Schloss Tirol, Italian: Castel Tirolo) is a castle in the comune (municipality) of Tirol near Merano, in the Burggrafenamt district of South Tyrol, Italy. It was the ancestral seat of the Counts of Tyrol and gave the whole Tyrol region its name.

== History ==
The castle hill has been inhabited since ancient times. Several artefacts and one field of graves from the early Middle Ages have been identified. Archeologists have excavated a church with three apses dating from the early Christian period.

The first castle was built before 1100. The second construction phase including the keep dates to 1139/40. A third phase of construction took place in the second half of the 13th century under Count Meinhard II of Gorizia-Tyrol. In 1347 Meinhard's granddaughter Countess Margaret of Tyrol was besieged here by the forces of the Luxembourg king Charles IV. The castle remained the seat of Tyrol's sovereigns until 1420, when the Habsburg archduke Frederick IV moved the administrative seat to Innsbruck north of the Brenner Pass.

In modern times parts of the castle fell into the so-called "Köstengraben", a steep gorge. It was even sold in order to be used as a quarry. In the 19th century the castle was restored; the keep was rebuilt in 1904.

Regarding art history, the frescos of the castle's chapel are of special interest as well as two Romanesque portals with opulent marble sculptures showing legendary creatures, religious themes, and geometric ornaments. The chapel also houses the oldest-known painting of the coat of arms of Tyrol, the Red Eagle.

The castle has served as the site of a museum since the early 1980s. Since then, the late Middle Ages have yielded a series of amazing archaeological discoveries. Since 2003, Tyrol Castle houses the South Tyrolean Museum of History. Next to the castle there is a falconry with a nursing ward for birds of prey.

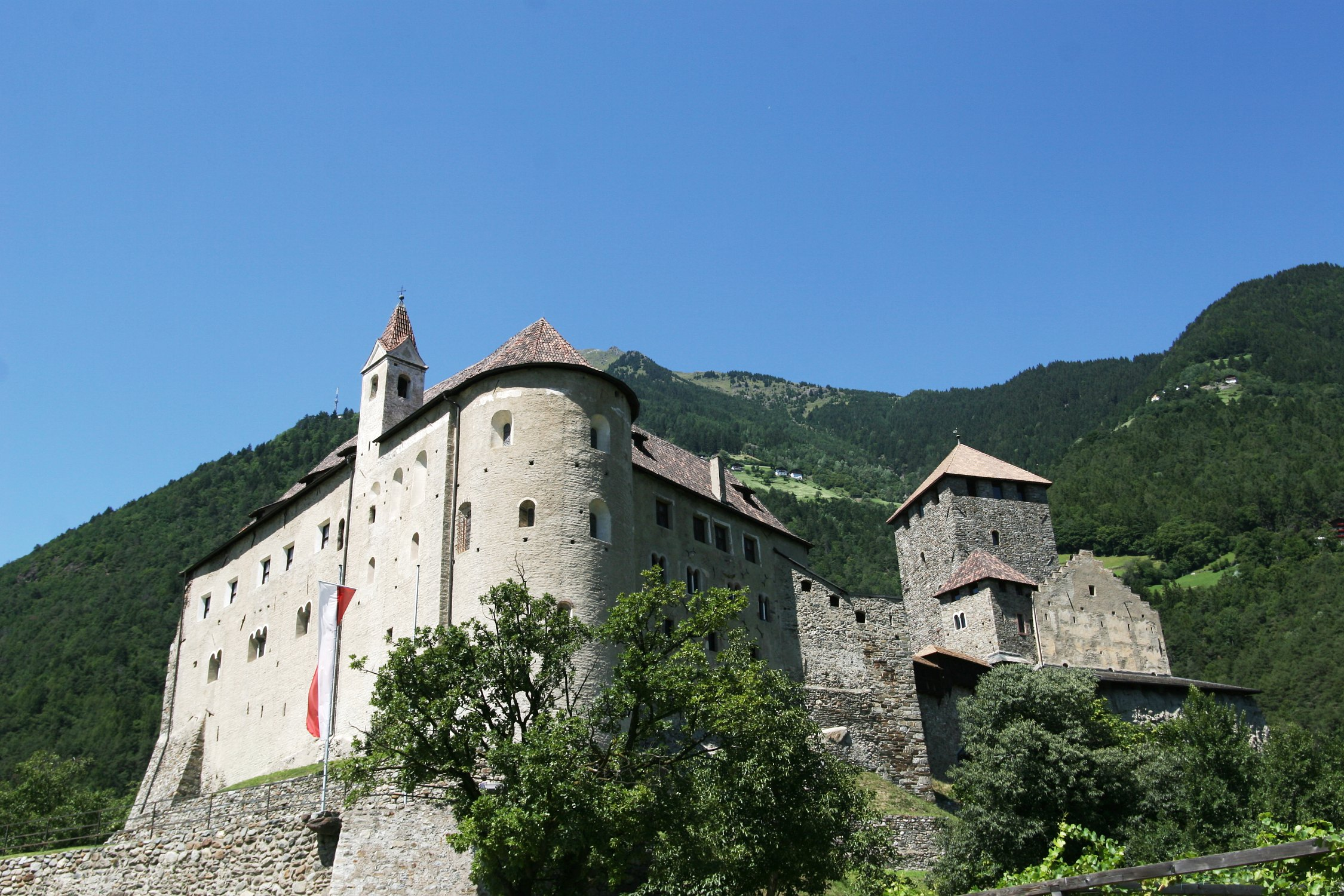
Exterior

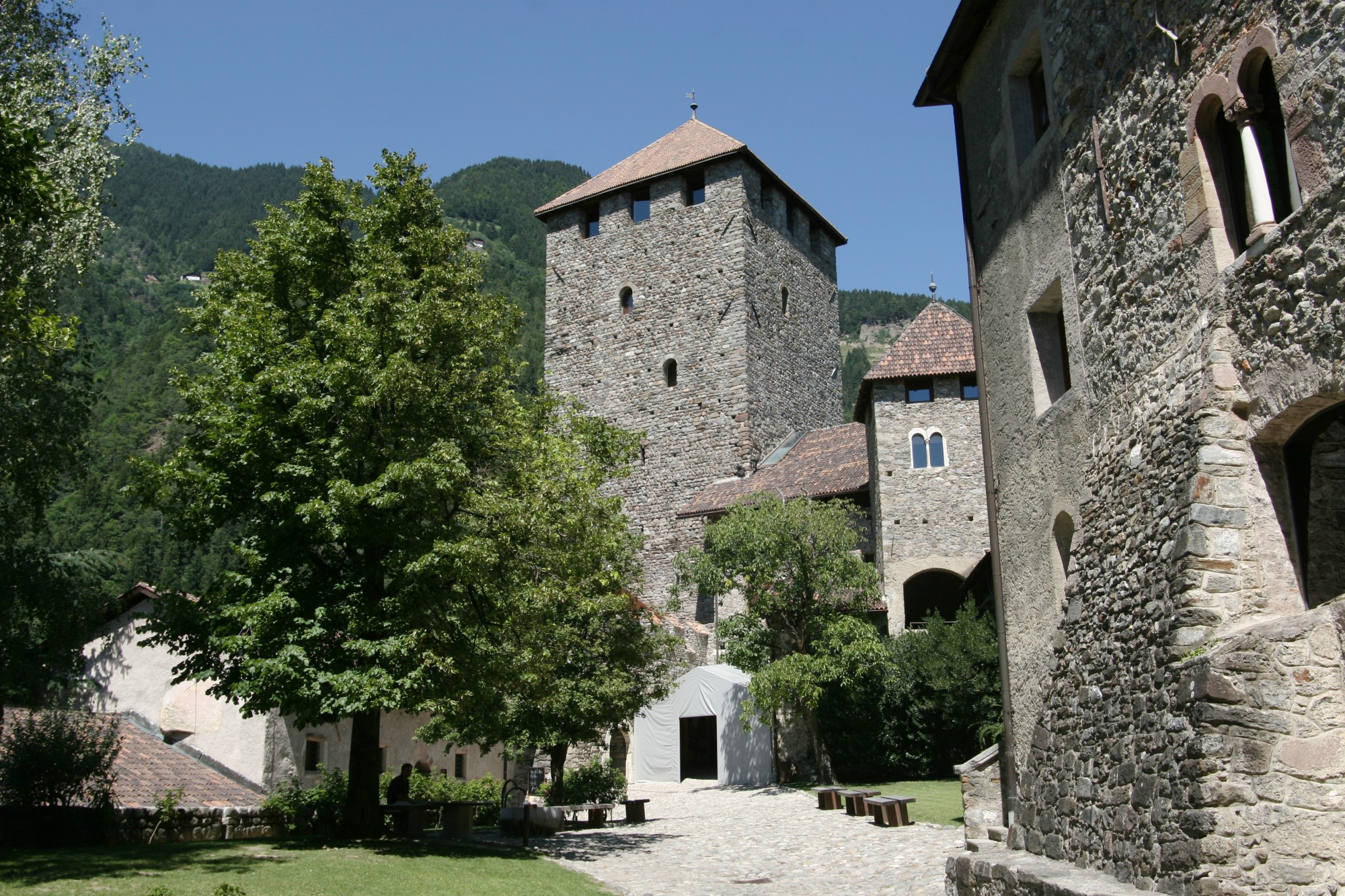
Courtyard

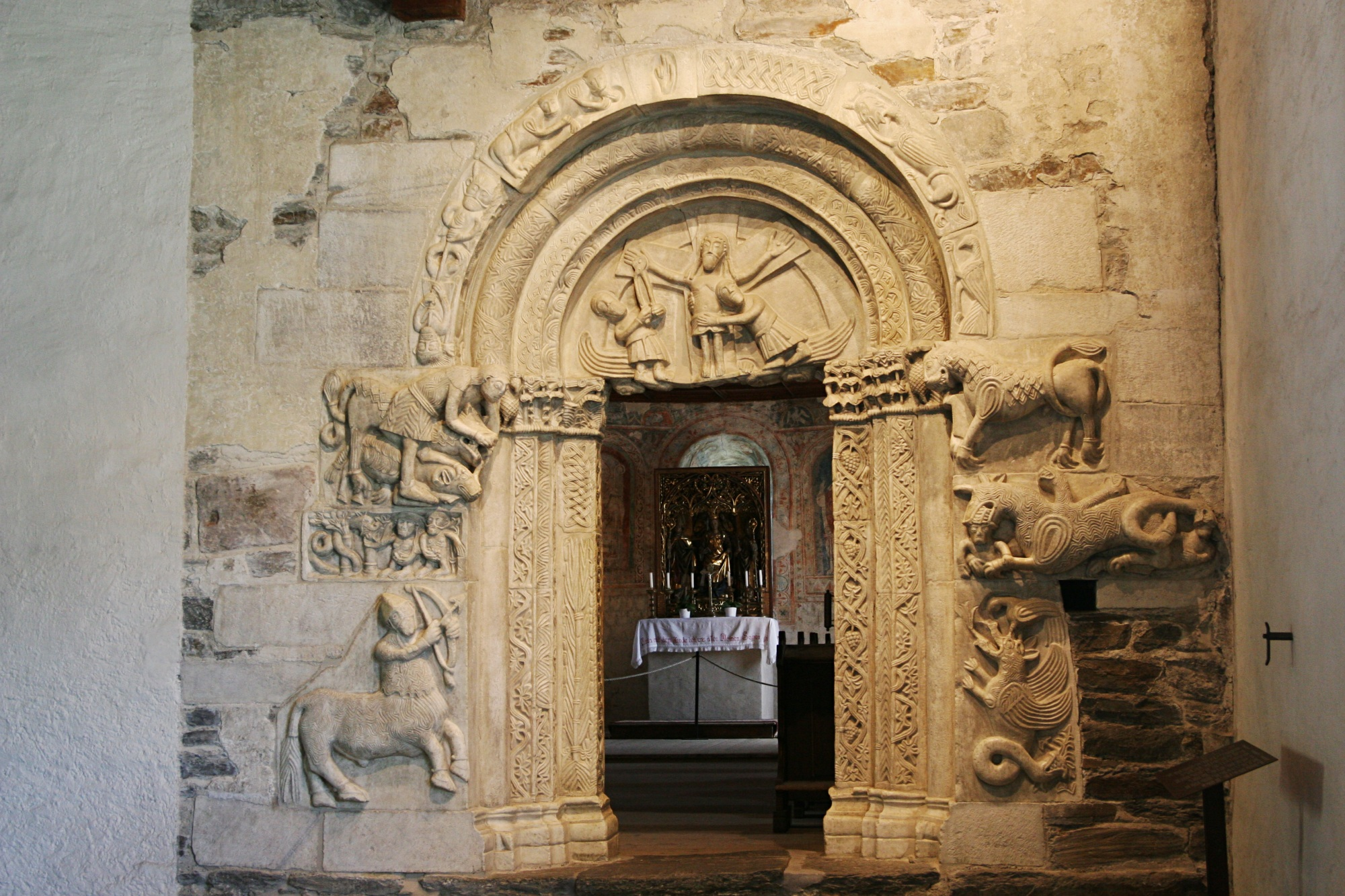
Romanesque portal of the castle's chapel

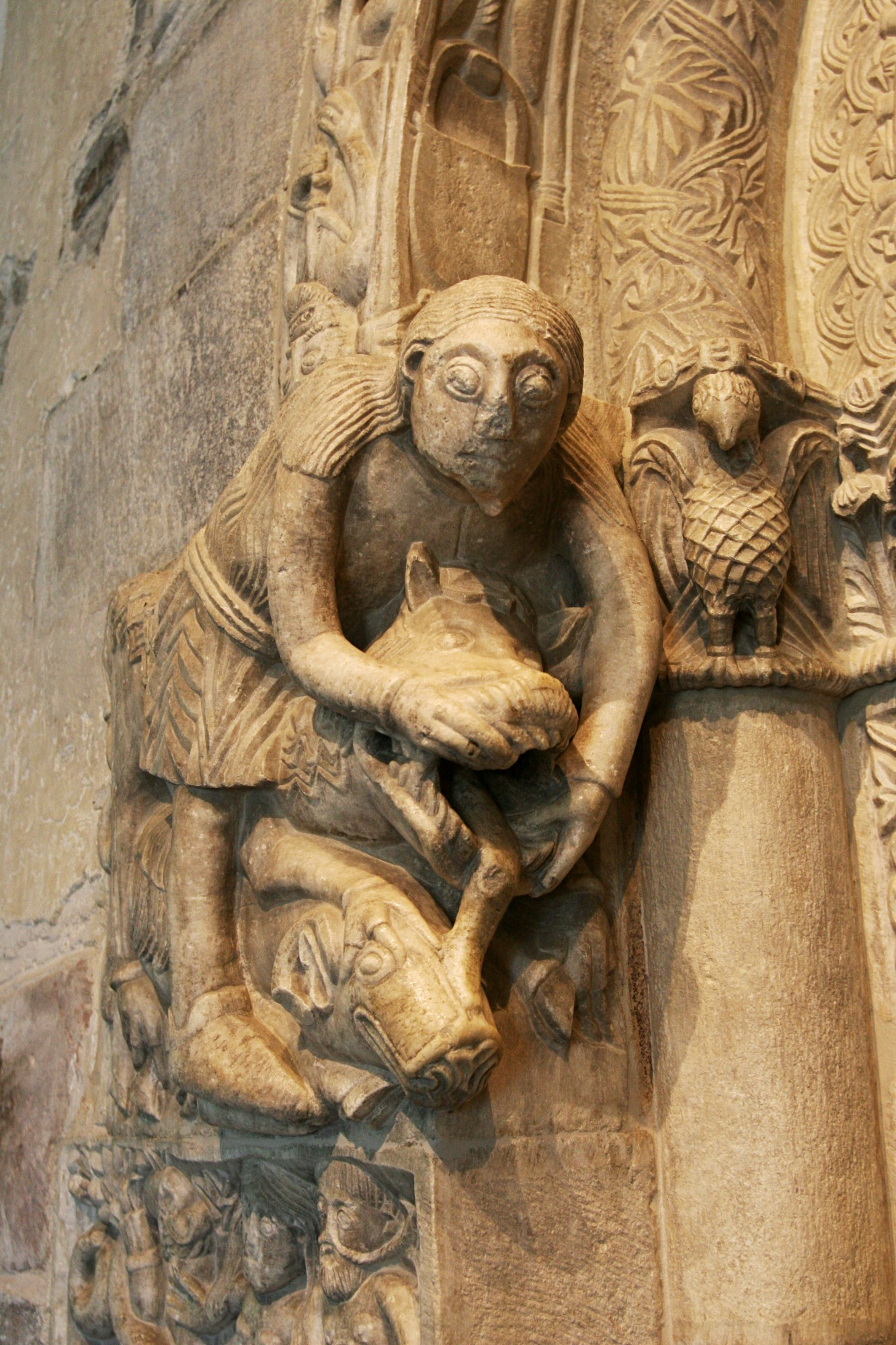
Portal of the chapel, detail

== See also ==
- List of castles in South Tyrol
