= Marling, South Tyrol =

Marling
- Comune
- Gemeinde Marling; Comune di Marlengo
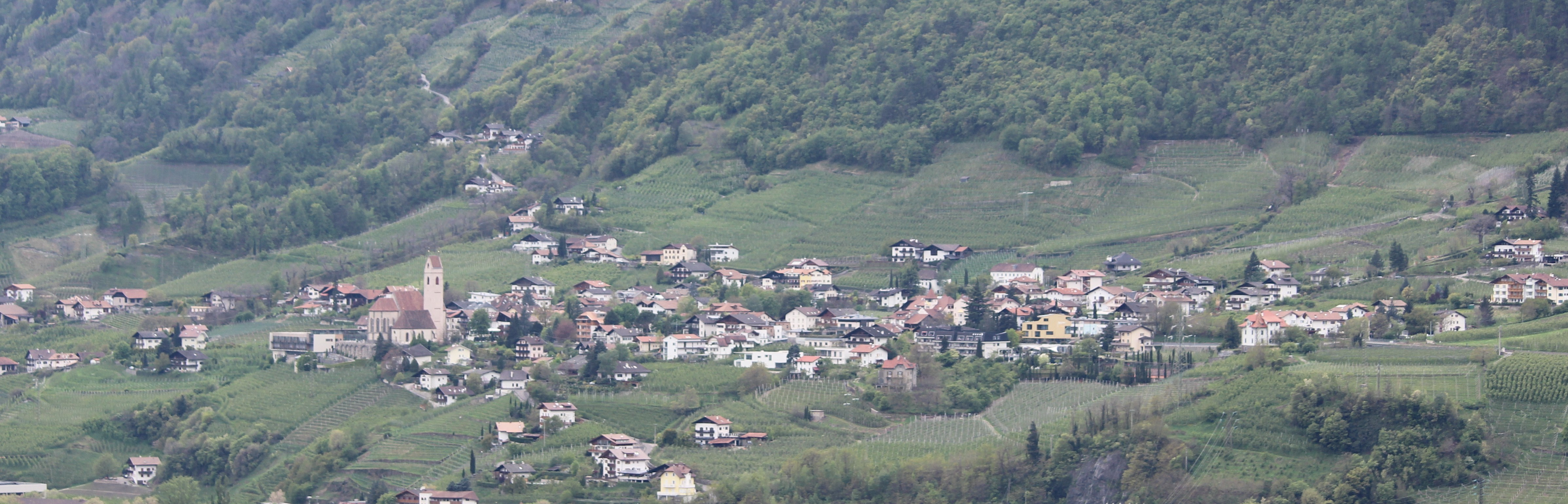
- View of Marling

- Location within Italy Location within Trentino-Alto Adige/Südtirol
- Coordinates: 46°39′N 11°9′E
- Country: Italy
- Region: Trentino-Alto Adige/Südtirol
- Province: South Tyrol (BZ)

Government
  - Mayor: Felix Lanpacher

Area
  - Total: 12.8 km^{2} (4.9 sq mi)

Population (Nov. 2017)
  - Total: 2,710
  - Density: 212/km^{2} (548/sq mi)
- Demonym(s): German: Marlinger; Italian: marlinghesi
- Time zone: UTC+1 (CET)
  - Summer (DST): UTC+2 (CEST)
- Postal code: 39020
- Dialing code: 0473
- Website: Official website

Marling (German pronunciation: [ˈmarlɪŋ]; Italian: Marlengo [marˈleŋɡo]) is a comune (municipality) and a village in South Tyrol in northern Italy, located about 25 kilometres (16 mi) northwest of Bolzano.

== Geography ==
As of the year 2017, it had a population of 2,710 and an area of 12.8 square kilometres (4.9 mi^{2}).

Marling borders the following municipalities: Tscherms, Algund, Lana, Merano and Partschins.

== History ==
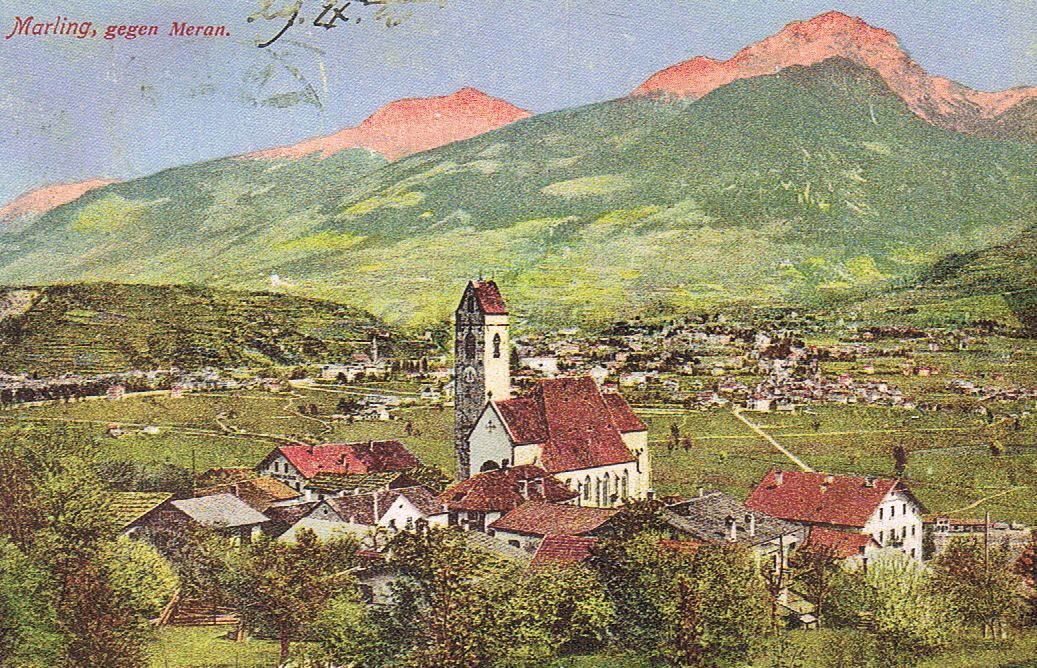
A view of Marling towards Meran from a 1908 postcard

=== Coat-of-arms ===
The shield is argent a fess azure and a gules rampant lion. These are the arms of the Lords of Marling who lived in two castles in the village until 1426. The emblem was adopted in 1966.

== Society ==
=== Linguistic distribution ===
According to the 2011 census, 87.80% of the population speak German, 12.00% Italian and 0.20% Ladin as first language.

=== Demographic evolution ===
Historical population

Year	Pop.	±%
1861	?	—
1871	?	—
1881	?	—
1901	?	—
1911	?	—

Year	Pop.	±%
1921	1,427	—
1931	1,935	+35.6%
1936	2,085	+7.8%
1951	1,930	−7.4%
1961	1,743	−9.7%

Year	Pop.	±%
1971	1,867	+7.1%
1981	2,013	+7.8%
1991	2,041	+1.4%
2001	2,197	+7.6%

Source: Data from ISTAT
