= Tscherms =

- Comune
- Gemeinde Tscherms; Comune di Cermes
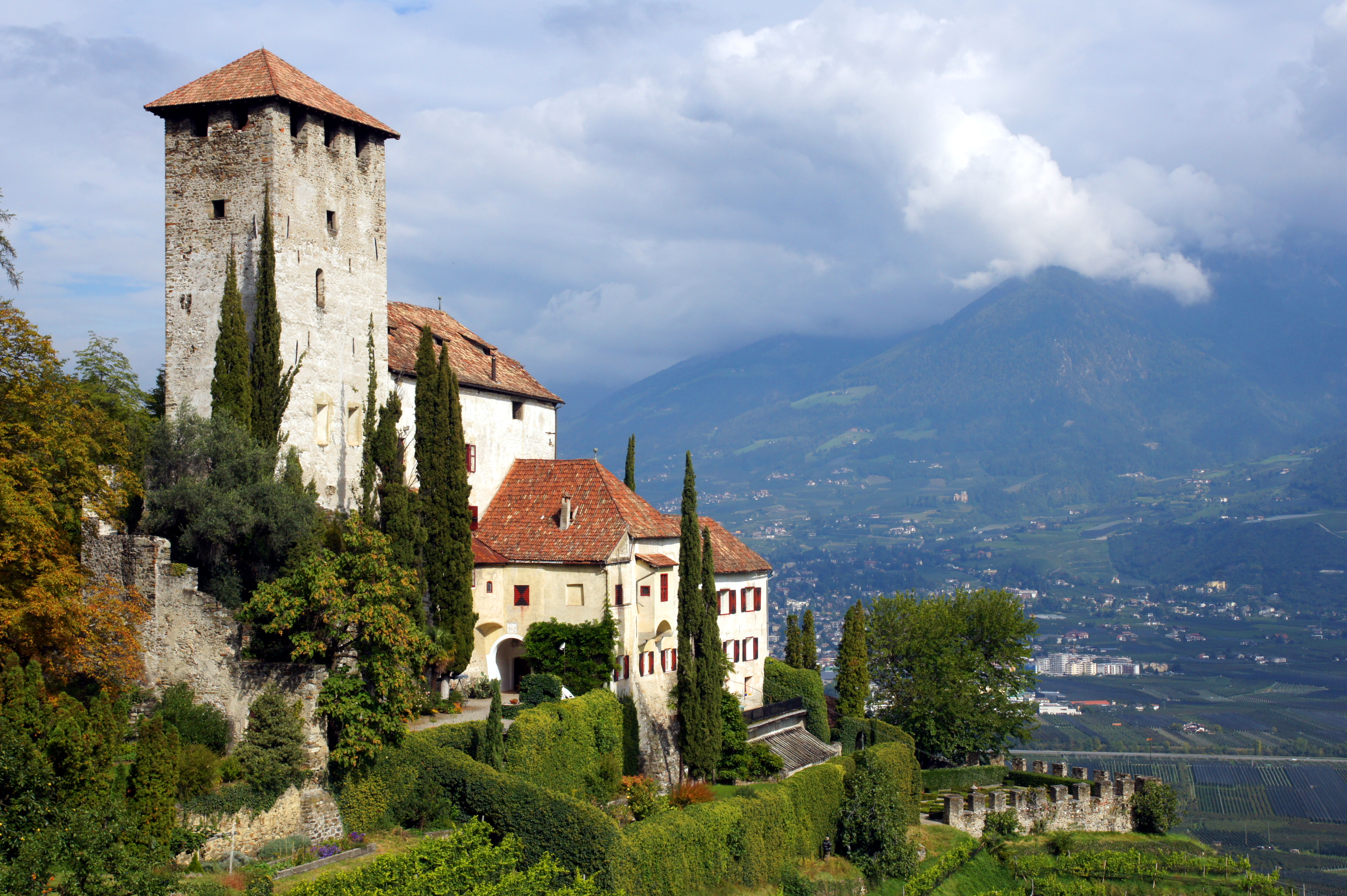
- Lebenberg Castle

- Location within Italy Location within Trentino-Alto Adige/Südtirol
- Coordinates: 46°38′N 11°9′E
- Country: Italy
- Region: Trentino-Alto Adige/Südtirol
- Province: South Tyrol (BZ)

Government
  - Mayor: Astrid Kuprian

Area
  - Total: 6.6 km^{2} (2.5 sq mi)

Population (Dez. 2012)
  - Total: 1,441
  - Density: 220/km^{2} (570/sq mi)
- Demonym(s): German: Tschermser; Italian: cermesi
- Time zone: UTC+1 (CET)
  - Summer (DST): UTC+2 (CEST)
- Postal code: 39010
- Dialing code: 0473
- Website: Official website

Tscherms (German pronunciation: [tʃɛrms]; Italian: Cermes [ˈtʃɛrmes]) is a comune (municipality) in South Tyrol in northern Italy, located about 20 kilometres (12 mi) northwest of Bolzano. Once part of the commune of Marling, Tscherms became a commune on its own in 1897.

== Geography ==
As of December 31 2012, it had a population of 1,441 and an area of 6.6 square kilometres (2.5 mi^{2}).

Tscherms borders the following municipalities: Lana, Marling and Merano.

== History ==
=== Coat-of-arms ===
The emblem is a rampant fox on or background. It is the sign of the Lords of Fuchsberg owners of the village from 1427 to 1832. The arms was adopted in 1966.

== Society ==
=== Linguistic distribution ===
According to the 2024 census, 93.88% of the population speak German, 5.97% Italian and 0.15% Ladin as first language.

=== Demographic evolution ===
Historical population

Year	Pop.	±%
1910	?	—
1910	879	—
1921	828	−5.8%
1931	912	+10.1%

Year	Pop.	±%
1936	815	−10.6%
1951	861	+5.6%
1961	888	+3.1%
1971	1,085	+22.2%

Year	Pop.	±%
1981	1,025	−5.5%
1991	1,118	+9.1%
2001	1,228	+9.8%

Source: Data from ISTAT
