= Schenna =

- Comune
- Gemeinde Schenna; Comune di Scena
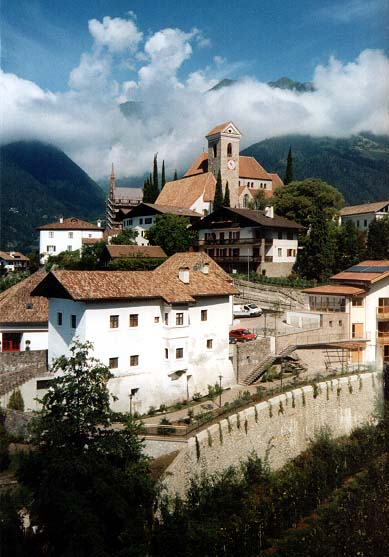
- A panorama of Schenna

- Location within Italy Location within Trentino-Alto Adige/Südtirol
- Coordinates: 46°41′N 11°11′E
- Country: Italy
- Region: Trentino-Alto Adige/Südtirol
- Province: South Tyrol (BZ)
- Frazioni: Schennaberg (Montescena), Tall (Valle), Verdins

Government
  - Mayor: Annelies Pichler

Area
  - Total: 48.2 km^{2} (18.6 sq mi)
- Elevation: 600 m (2,000 ft)

Population (Nov. 2010)
  - Total: 2,841
  - Density: 58.9/km^{2} (153/sq mi)
- Demonym(s): German: Schennaner; Italian: di Scena
- Time zone: UTC+1 (CET)
  - Summer (DST): UTC+2 (CEST)
- Postal code: 39017
- Dialing code: 0473
- Website: Official website

Schenna (German pronunciation: [ˈʃɛna]; Italian: Scena [ˈʃɛːna]) is a comune (municipality) and a village in South Tyrol in northern Italy, located in the Passeier Valley, about 25 kilometres (16 mi) northwest of the city of Bolzano.

== Geography ==
As of 30 November 2010, it had a population of 2,841 and an area of 48.2 square kilometres (18.6 mi^{2}).

Schenna borders the following municipalities: Hafling, Kuens, Merano, Riffian, St. Leonhard in Passeier, Sarntal, and Tirol.

=== Frazioni ===
The municipality contains the frazioni (subdivisions, mainly villages and hamlets) Schennaberg (Montescena), Tall (Valle), and Verdins.

== History ==
=== Origin ===
In the Middle Ages an important castle was built. Archduke Johann of Austria acquired it in 1845. In the 1970s, 1980s and 1990s many festivals took place inside it, but now, for health and safety reasons (since there was no emergency exit) there are no more.

Inside the castle, known as "Schloss Schenna" Andreas Hofer's cot is to be found.

=== Place-name ===
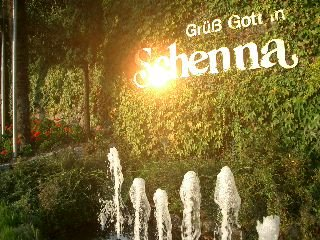

"Schenna" comes from the German "Schön Au" meaning "Lovely Pasture" which is why it used to be written "Schönna", although others say that it is named after a Roman landowner called Sconius. In the 6th-7th century people began to arrive from Bavaria and Franconia.

=== Coat-of-arms ===
The shield is argent and sable party per fess; at the top a gules lion is represented coming out from the bottom. The emblem was adopted in 1972, even if it was in use prior to World War I.

== Society ==
=== Linguistic distribution ===
According to the 2024 census, 96.99% of the population speak German, 2.94% Italian and 0.07% Ladin as first language.

=== Demographic evolution ===
Historical population

Year	Pop.	±%
1860	?	—
1870	?	—
1880	1,628	—
1900	?	—
1910	1,702	—

Year	Pop.	±%
1921	1,754	+3.1%
1931	1,775	+1.2%
1936	1,950	+9.9%
1951	1,963	+0.7%
1961	2,037	+3.8%

Year	Pop.	±%
1971	2,396	+17.6%
1981	2,518	+5.1%
1991	2,527	+0.4%
2001	2,677	+5.9%

Source: Data from ISTAT
