= Tirol, South Tyrol =

Tirol
- Comune
- Gemeinde Tirol; Comune di Tirolo
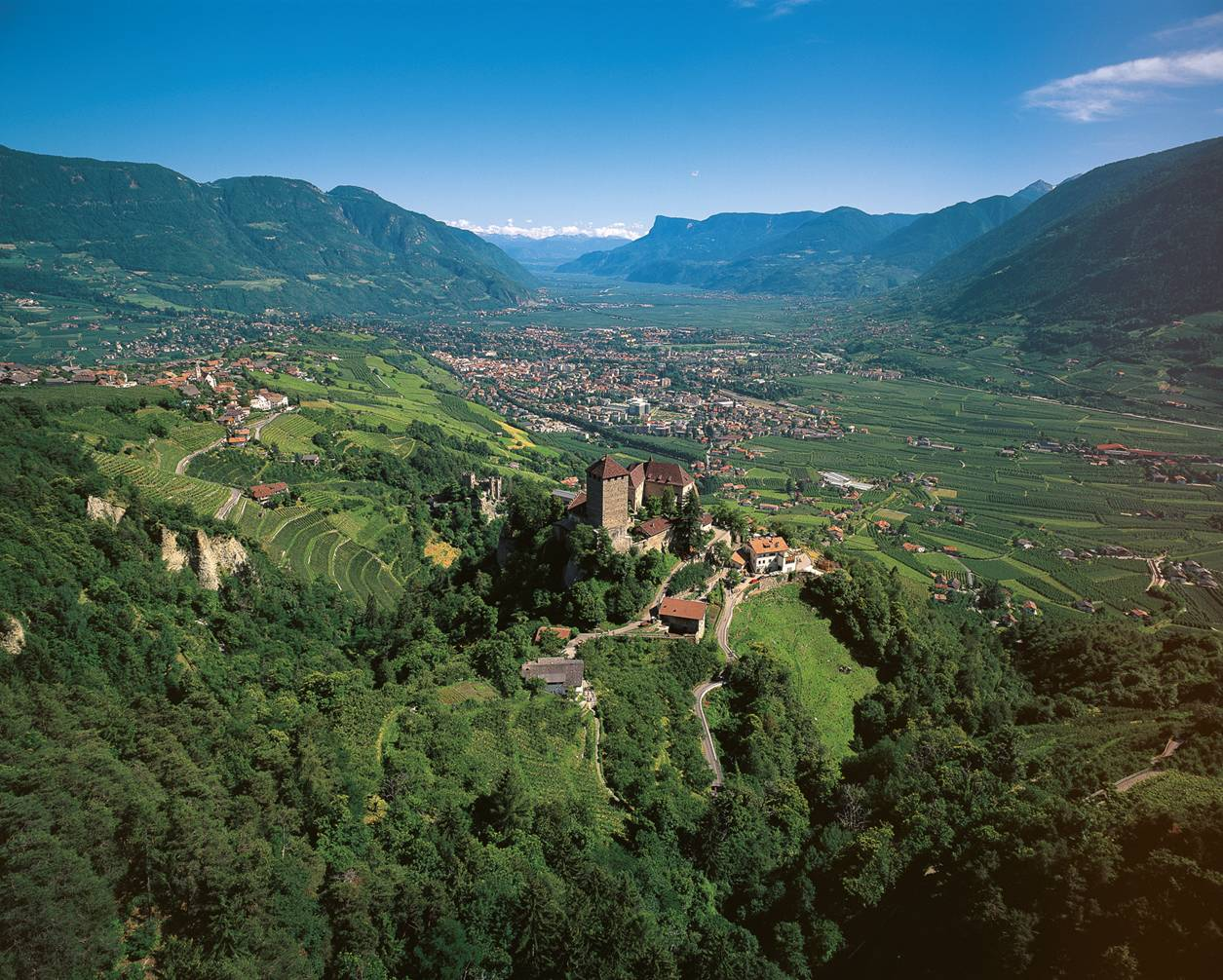
- The village of Tirol

- Location within Italy Location within Trentino-Alto Adige/Südtirol
- Coordinates: 46°41′N 11°9′E
- Country: Italy
- Region: Trentino-Alto Adige/Südtirol
- Province: South Tyrol (BZ)
- Frazioni: St. Peter (San Pietro)

Government
  - Mayor: Christoph Pircher

Area
  - Total: 25.6 km^{2} (9.9 sq mi)
- Elevation: 594 m (1,949 ft)

Population (Nov. 2010)
  - Total: 2,469
  - Density: 96.4/km^{2} (250/sq mi)
- Demonym(s): German: Tiroler; Italian: tirolesi
- Time zone: UTC+1 (CET)
  - Summer (DST): UTC+2 (CEST)
- Postal code: 39019
- Dialing code: 0473
- Website: Official website

Tirol (German: [tiˈroːl]; Italian: Tirolo [tiˈrɔːlo]) is a comune (municipality) in the province of South Tyrol in northern Italy, located about 25 kilometres (16 mi) northwest of the city of Bolzano.

== Geography ==
As of November 30, 2010, it had a population of 2,469 and an area of 25.6 square kilometres (9.9 mi^{2}).

Tirol borders the following municipalities: Kuens, Algund, Merano, Moos in Passeier, Partschins, Riffian, and Schenna.

The name of the historical region of Tyrol stems from the Castle Tyrol, which is located in the village.

=== Frazioni ===
The municipality of Tirol contains the frazione (subdivision) St. Peter (San Pietro).

== History ==
=== Coat-of-arms ===
The coat shows an eagle of gules on argent background, surmounted by a vert lime branch. The insignia has medieval origins and was the coat of the Counts of Tirol who took their name from Tirol Castle. The emblem was granted in 1970 when the branch was added.

== Society ==
=== Linguistic distribution ===
According to the 2024 census, 96.13% of the population speak German, 3.78% Italian and 0.09% Ladin as first language.

=== Demographic evolution ===
Historical population

Year	Pop.	±%
1860	?	—
1870	?	—
1880	1,151	—
1900	?	—
1910	1,769	—

Year	Pop.	±%
1921	1,766	−0.2%
1931	1,913	+8.3%
1936	1,853	−3.1%
1951	1,757	−5.2%
1961	1,724	−1.9%

Year	Pop.	±%
1971	2,010	+16.6%
1981	2,080	+3.5%
1991	2,237	+7.5%
2001	2,356	+5.3%

Source: Data from ISTAT
