= Ulten Valley =

Coordinates: 46°33′N 11°00′E

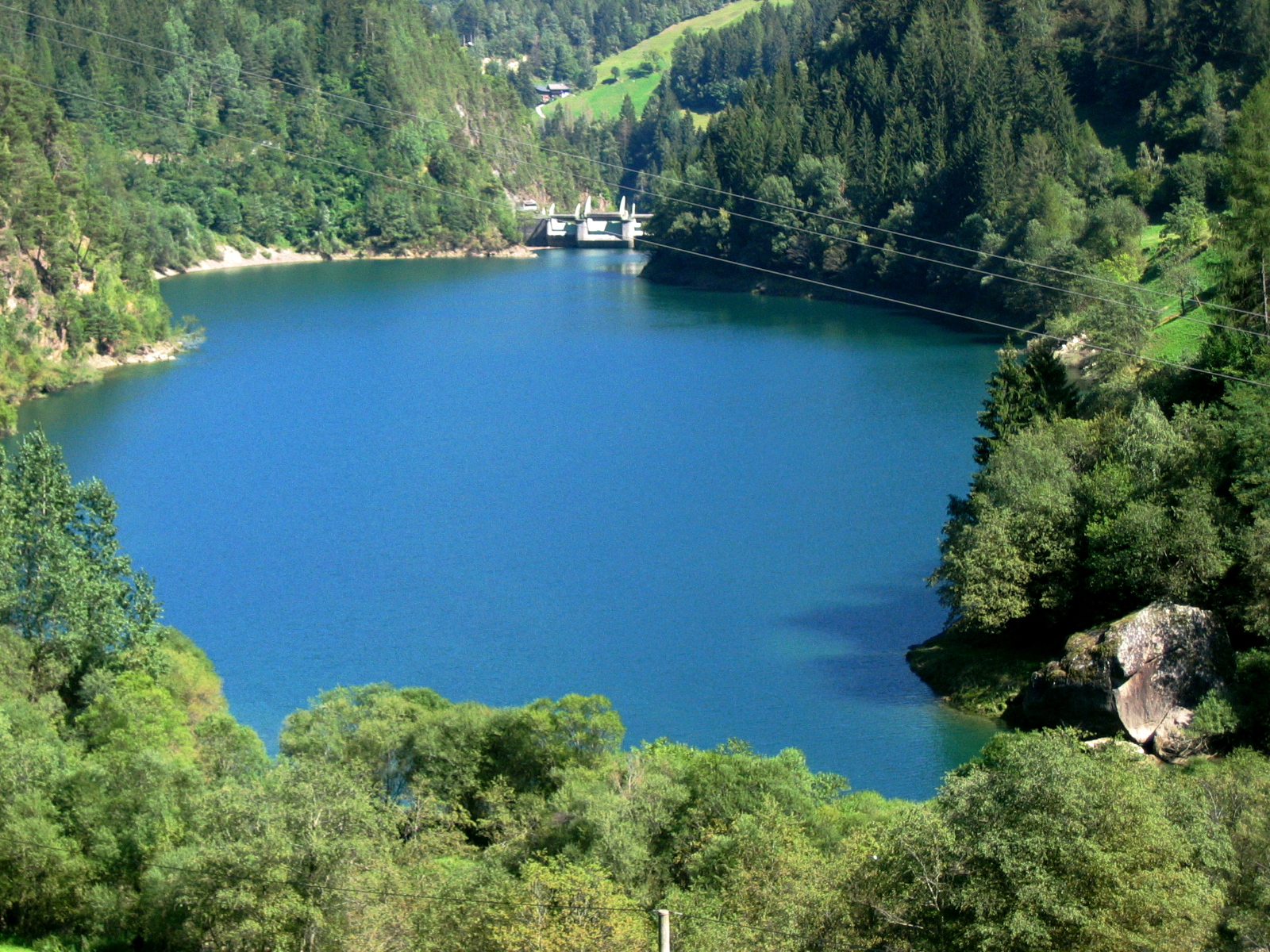
Reservoir Sankt Pankraz in the Ulten Valley

The Ulten Valley (German: Ultental or Ulten, Italian: Val d'Ultimo) is a 40 km (25 mile) long mountain valley in the western part of the province of South Tyrol in northern Italy.

It is the valley of the stream Falschauer, a right tributary of the Adige. Its orientation is southwest to northeast, parallel to the lower Vinschgau, and it is located south of Meran. The valley ends in the commune of Lana. A small road leading south connects the valley with Proveis and the Val di Non in Trentino.

The municipality Ulten covers most of the Ulten valley. The lower part of the valley is in the municipality of St. Pankraz. The population of the Ulten valley is predominantly German-speaking (more than 98% according to 2001 census). The westernmost, highest part of the valley is part of the Stelvio National Park.
