= Kuens =

- Comune
- Gemeinde Kuens; Comune di Caines
- Coat of arms

- Location within Italy Location within Trentino-Alto Adige/Südtirol
- Coordinates: 46°42′N 11°10′E
- Country: Italy
- Region: Trentino-Alto Adige/Südtirol
- Province: South Tyrol (BZ)

Government
  - Mayor: Manfred Raffl

Area
  - Total: 1.7 km^{2} (0.66 sq mi)

Population (Nov. 2010)
  - Total: 399
  - Density: 230/km^{2} (610/sq mi)
- Demonym(s): German: Kuensner; Italian: comesi
- Time zone: UTC+1 (CET)
  - Summer (DST): UTC+2 (CEST)
- Postal code: 39010
- Dialing code: 0473
- Website: Official website

Kuens (German: [ˈkuːəns]; Italian: Caines [ˈkaines]) is a comune (municipality) and a village in South Tyrol in northern Italy, located about 25 kilometres (16 mi) northwest of the city of Bolzano in the Passeier Valley.

== Geography ==
As of 30 November 2010, it had a population of 399 and an area of 1.7 square kilometres (0.66 mi^{2}).

Kuens borders the following municipalities: Riffian, Schenna and Tirol.

== History ==
In the early eighth century, Kuens became the site of a small monastery founded by Saint Corbinian, who had been struck by the area's beauty on the second of his journeys to Rome. He bought some properties and planted vineyards and orchards and considered the area a "spiritual homeland", so much so that he chose it as the site for his burial.

=== Coat-of-arms ===
The emblem represents a bishop (that is, Saint Corbinian) with a gules mantle, the mitre of Or and aureola; a pastoral staff of Or in his right hand. A brown bear, with a load tied up to her back, through the bishop. The emblem was adopted in 1968.

== Society ==
=== Linguistic distribution ===
According to the 2024 census, 97.04% of the population speak German, 2.43% Italian and 0.54% Ladin as first language.

=== Demographic evolution ===
Historical population

Year	Pop.	±%
1880	160	—
1910	219	+36.9%
1921	200	−8.7%
1931	204	+2.0%

Year	Pop.	±%
1936	193	−5.4%
1951	225	+16.6%
1961	210	−6.7%
1971	242	+15.2%

Year	Pop.	±%
1981	272	+12.4%
1991	304	+11.8%
2001	318	+4.6%

Source: Data from ISTAT
