= Hafling =

- Comune
- Gemeinde Hafling; Comune di Avelengo
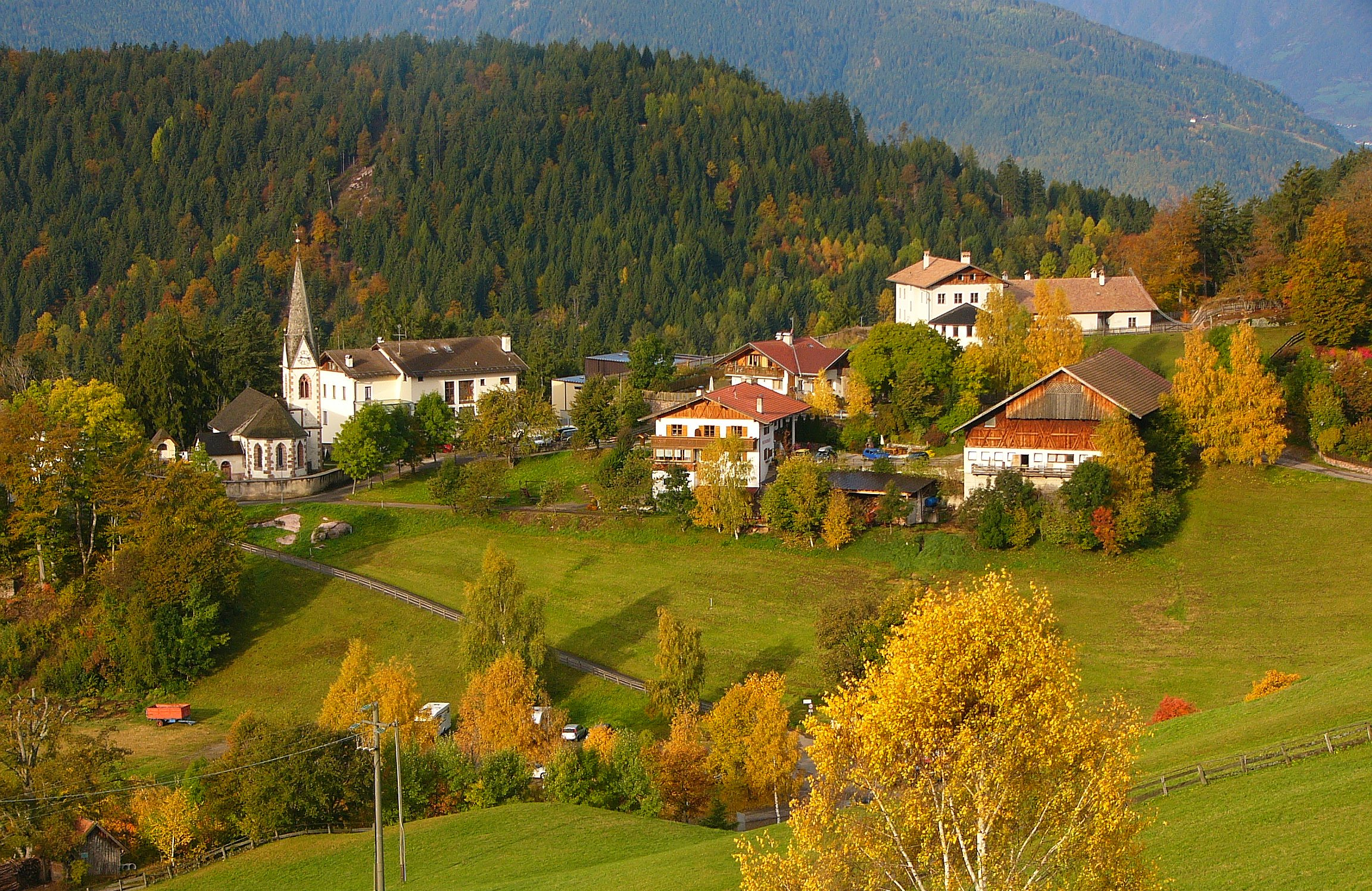
- View of Hafling

- Coat of arms

- Location within Italy Location within Trentino-Alto Adige/Südtirol
- Coordinates: 46°39′N 11°14′E
- Country: Italy
- Region: Trentino-Alto Adige/Südtirol
- Province: South Tyrol (BZ)

Government
  - Mayor: Sonja Anna Plank

Area
  - Total: 27.4 km^{2} (10.6 sq mi)

Population (Nov. 2010)
  - Total: 756
  - Density: 27.6/km^{2} (71.5/sq mi)
- Demonym(s): German: Haflinger; Italian: avelignese or avelenghese
- Time zone: UTC+1 (CET)
  - Summer (DST): UTC+2 (CEST)
- Postal code: 39010
- Dialing code: 0473
- Website: Official website

Hafling (German: [ˈhaːflɪŋ]; Italian: Avelengo [aveˈleŋɡo, aveˈlɛŋɡo]) is an Italian comune (municipality) and a village in South Tyrol in Italy about 20 kilometres (12 mi) northwest of Bolzano and high above the valley basin of Merano.

== Geography and population ==
As of January 1, 2024 it had a population of 701 and an area of 27.4 square kilometres (10.6 mi^{2}). Located on a high plateau at 1,290 meters (4232 feet) above sea level, it even has a skiing/hiking area which gets to 2000-2500 m.

Hafling borders the following municipalities: Merano, Sarntal, Schenna and Vöran.

== History ==
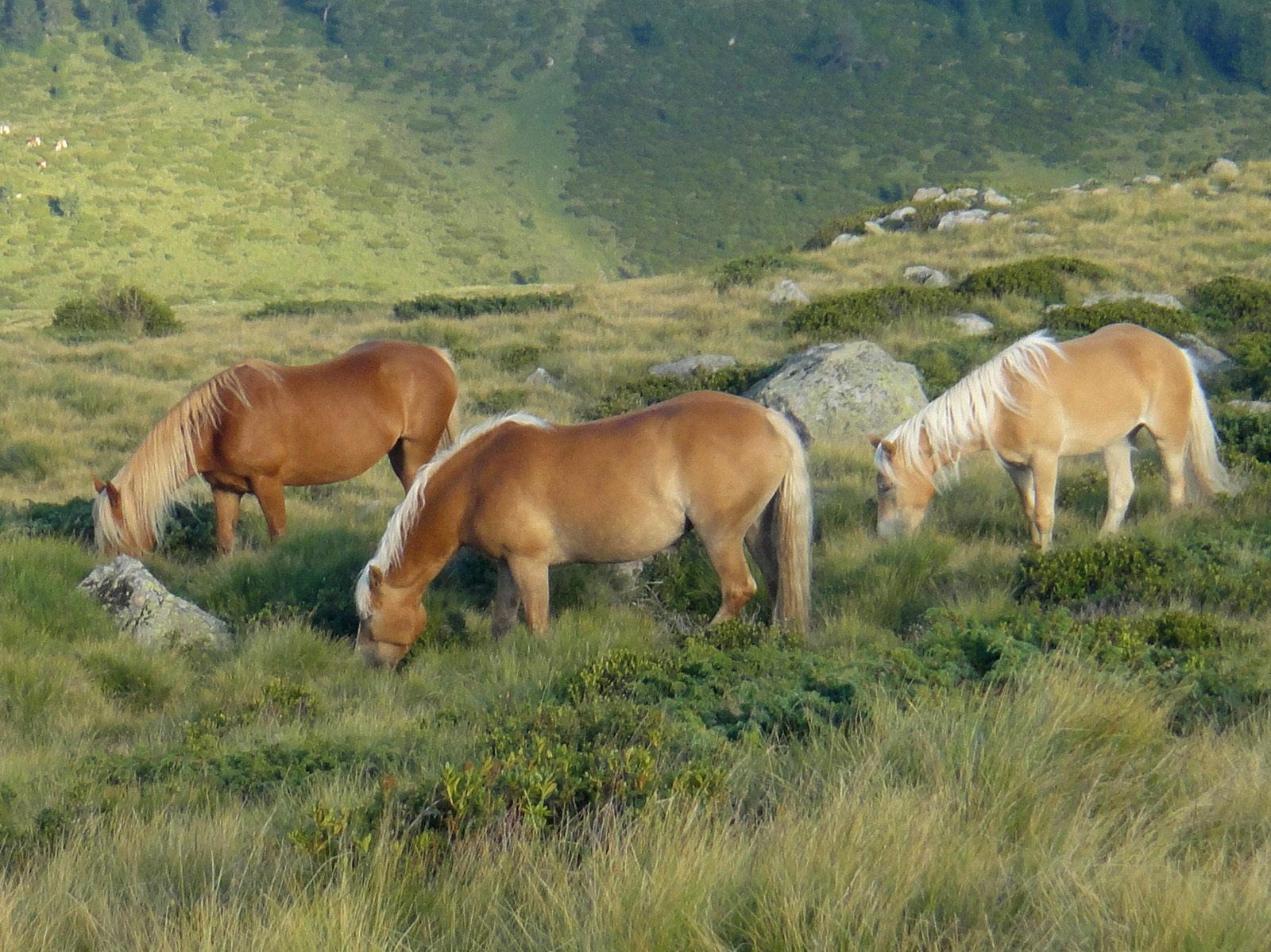
A group of Haflinger in Hafling

The city gave its name to the Haflinger breed of horses.

=== Coat of arms ===
The emblem is a natural breed Haflinger horse on a mountain with three vert peaks, through a pine tree. The mountain and the pine symbolize that the village is located at high elevation. The coat of arms was granted in 1967.

== Society ==
=== Linguistic distribution ===
According to the 2024 census, 96.87% of the population spoke German, 3.13% Italian as first language.

Language	1991	2001	2011	2024
German	97.96%	97.67%	97.58%	96.87%
Italian	2.04%	2.33%	2.42%	3.13%
Ladin	0%	0%	0%	0%
