= St. Leonhard in Passeier =

- Comune
- Gemeinde St. Leonhard in Passeier; Comune di San Leonardo in Passiria
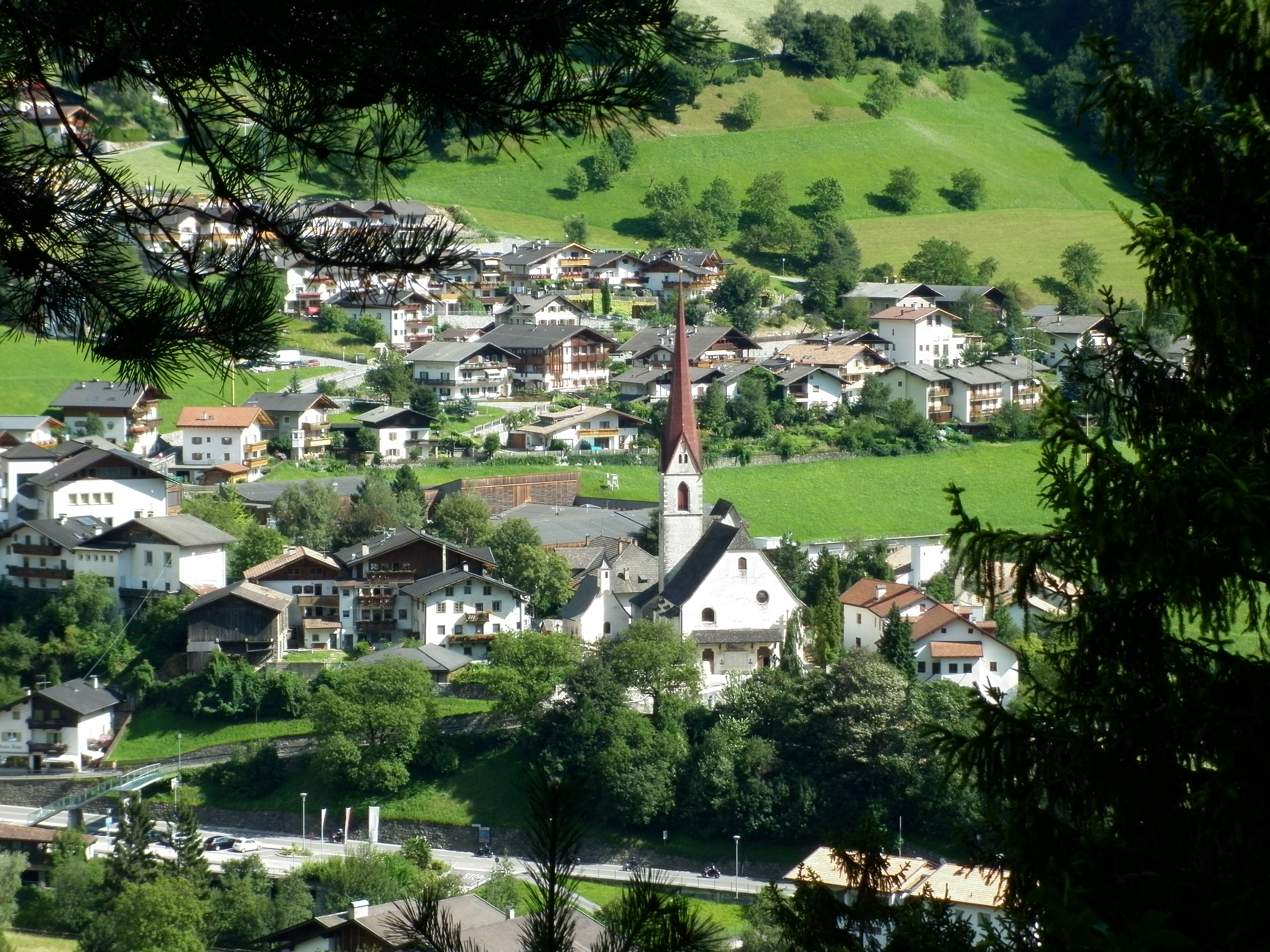
- St. Leonhard in Passeier in 2016

- Coat of arms

- Location within Italy Location within Trentino-Alto Adige/Südtirol
- Coordinates: 46°49′N 11°15′E
- Country: Italy
- Region: Trentino-Alto Adige/Südtirol
- Province: South Tyrol (BZ)
- Frazioni: Walten (Valtina), Schweinsteg (Sant'Orsola)

Government
  - Mayor: Robert Tschöll (SVP)

Area
  - Total: 88.4 km^{2} (34.1 sq mi)
- Elevation: 689 m (2,260 ft)

Population (Nov. 2010)
  - Total: 3,547
  - Density: 40.1/km^{2} (104/sq mi)
- Demonym(s): German: Sankt Leonharder; Italian:sanleonardesi
- Time zone: UTC+1 (CET)
  - Summer (DST): UTC+2 (CEST)
- Postal code: 39015
- Dialing code: 0437
- Patron saint: Saint Leonard
- Saint day: 11 November
- Website: Official website

St. Leonhard in Passeier (German pronunciation: [saŋkt ˈleːɔnhard ʔɪn paˈsaɪɐ]; Italian: San Leonardo in Passiria [san leoˈnardo im pasˈsiːrja]) is a comune (municipality) and a village in the Passeier Valley in South Tyrol, northern Italy, located about 35 kilometres (22 mi) north of Bolzano.

== Geography ==
As of 30 November 2010, it had a population of 3,547 and an area of 88.4 square kilometres (34.1 mi^{2}).

Its bordering municipalities are Moos in Passeier, Ratschings, Riffian, St. Martin in Passeier, Sarntal, and Schenna.

=== Frazioni ===
The municipality of St. Leonhard in Passeier contains the frazioni (subdivisions, mainly villages and hamlets) Walten (Valtina) and Schweinsteg (Sant'Orsola).

== History ==
=== Coat-of-arms ===
The shield is sable a curved pile reversed or. It is the sign of the Lords of Passeier who lived in Jaufenburg Castle in the 13th and 14th centuries. The coat of arms was granted in 1969.

== Society ==
=== Linguistic distribution ===
According to the 2024 census, 98.99% of the population speak German, 0.69% Italian and 0.33% Ladin as first language.

== Demographic evolution ==
Historical population

Year	Pop.	±%
1860	?	—
1870	?	—
1880	2,048	—
1900	?	—
1910	2,275	—

Year	Pop.	±%
1921	2,305	+1.3%
1931	2,470	+7.2%
1936	2,675	+8.3%
1951	2,481	−7.3%
1961	2,672	+7.7%

Year	Pop.	±%
1971	2,859	+7.0%
1981	3,038	+6.3%
1991	3,330	+9.6%
2001	3,437	+3.2%
2010	3,547	+3.2%

Source: Data from ISTAT
