= Riffian, South Tyrol =

Riffian
- Comune
- Gemeinde Riffian; Comune di Rifiano
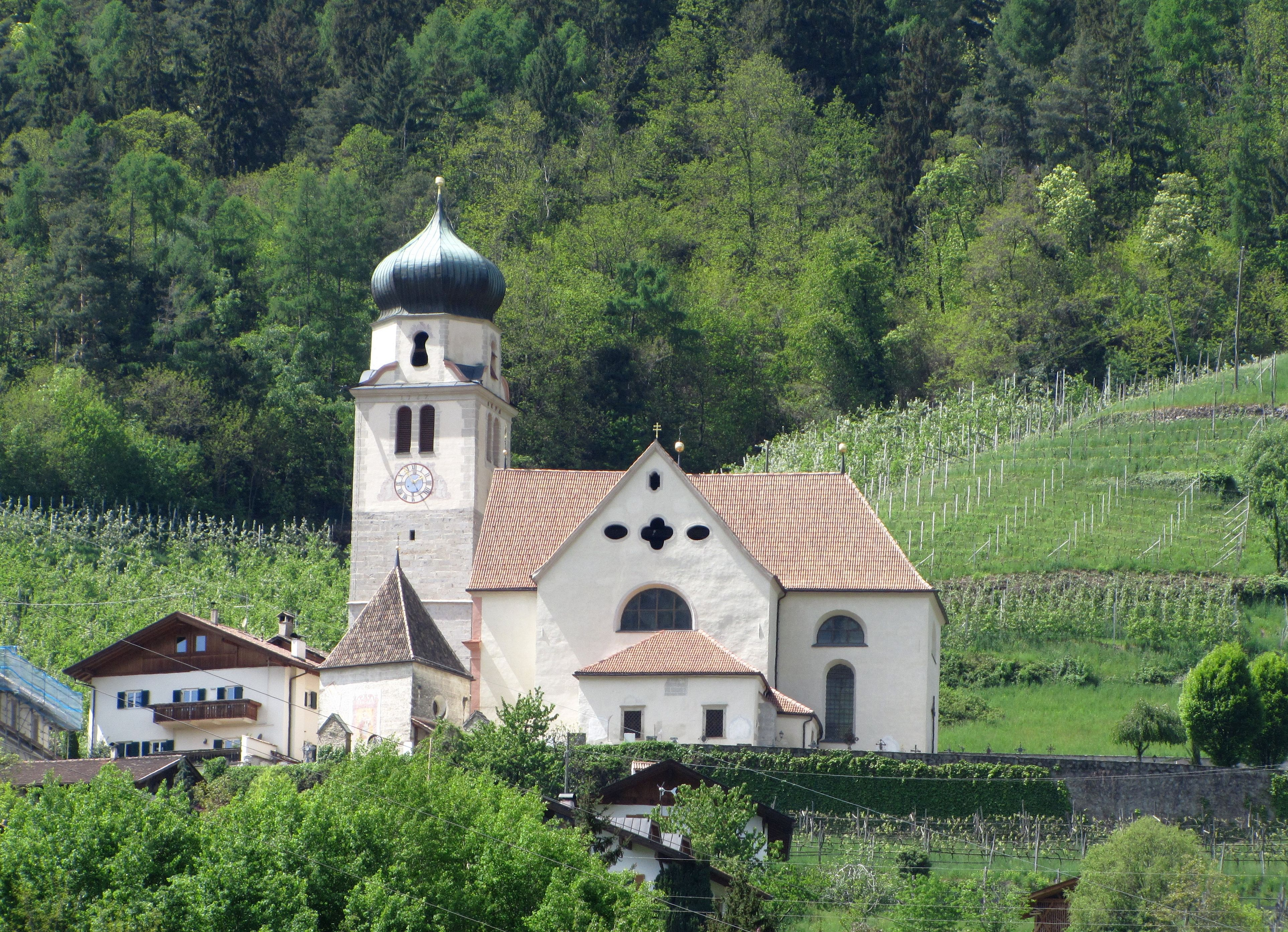
- Church of the Seven Pains of the Virgin Mary

- Location within Italy Location within Trentino-Alto Adige/Südtirol
- Coordinates: 46°42′N 11°11′E
- Country: Italy
- Region: Trentino-Alto Adige/Südtirol
- Province: South Tyrol (BZ)
- Frazioni: Magdfeld, Vernuer (Vernurio)

Government
  - Mayor: Alexander Turato (SVP)

Area
  - Total: 35.8 km^{2} (13.8 sq mi)
- Elevation: 504 m (1,654 ft)

Population (Nov. 2010)
  - Total: 1,306
  - Density: 36.5/km^{2} (94.5/sq mi)
- Demonym(s): German: Riffianer; Italian: di Rifiano
- Time zone: UTC+1 (CET)
  - Summer (DST): UTC+2 (CEST)
- Postal code: 39010
- Dialing code: 0473
- Website: Official website

Riffian (German pronunciation: [ˈrɪfɪan]; Italian: Rifiano [riˈfjaːno]) is a comune (municipality) and a village in South Tyrol in northern Italy, located about 25 kilometres (16 mi) northwest of Bolzano.

== Geography ==
As of 30 November 2010, it had a population of 1,306 and an area of 35.8 square kilometres (13.8 mi^{2}).

Riffian borders the following municipalities: Kuens, Moos in Passeier, St. Leonhard in Passeier, St. Martin in Passeier, Schenna, and Tirol.

=== Frazioni ===
The municipality contains the frazioni (subdivisions, mainly villages and hamlets) Magdfeld and Vernuer (Vernurio).

== History ==
=== Coat-of-arms ===
The emblem represents a bell tower, with the bell box and the onion dome, on azure; it is the symbol of the local church in the village. The emblem was adopted in 1968.

== Society ==
=== Linguistic distribution ===
According to the 2024 census, 96.28% of the population speak German, 3.03% Italian and 0.70% Ladin as first language.

=== Demographic evolution ===
Historical population

Year	Pop.	±%
1860	?	—
1870	?	—
1880	681	—
1900	?	—
1910	724	—

Year	Pop.	±%
1921	714	−1.4%
1931	769	+7.7%
1936	803	+4.4%
1951	777	−3.2%
1961	838	+7.9%

Year	Pop.	±%
1971	882	+5.3%
1981	1,022	+15.9%
1991	1,048	+2.5%
2001	1,192	+13.7%

Source: Data from ISTAT
