= Moos in Passeier =

- Comune
- Gemeinde Moos in Passeier; Comune di Moso in Passiria
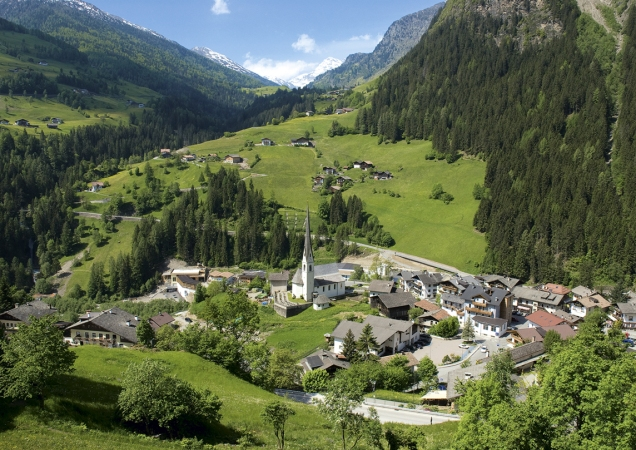
- Moos in Passeier

- Coat of arms

- Location within Italy Location within Trentino-Alto Adige/Südtirol
- Coordinates: 46°50′N 11°10′E
- Country: Italy
- Region: Trentino-Alto Adige/Südtirol
- Province: South Tyrol (BZ)
- Frazioni: Pfelders (Plan), Platt (Plata), Rabenstein (Corvara), Stuls (Stulles), Ulfas

Government
  - Mayor: Stefan Ilmer

Area
  - Total: 193.8 km^{2} (74.8 sq mi)

Population (Nov. 2010)
  - Total: 2,174
  - Density: 11.22/km^{2} (29.05/sq mi)
- Demonym(s): German: Mooser; Italian: di Moso
- Time zone: UTC+1 (CET)
  - Summer (DST): UTC+2 (CEST)
- Postal code: 39013
- Dialing code: 0473
- Website: Official website

Moos in Passeier (German: [ˈmoːs ɪn paˈsaɪɐ]; Italian: Moso in Passiria [ˈmoːzo im pasˈsiːrja]) is a comune (municipality) and a village in the Passeier Valley. It is located in South Tyrol, northern Italy, about 40 kilometres (25 mi) northwest of the province's capital Bolzano, on the border with Austria.

== Geography ==
As of 30 November 2010, it had a population of 2,174 and an area of 193.8 square kilometres (74.8 mi^{2}).

The word Moos means bog or wetland in Austro-Bavarian dialects of German.

Moos in Passeier borders the following municipalities: Partschins, Ratschings, Riffian, St. Leonhard in Passeier, St. Martin in Passeier, Schnals, Tirol and Sölden (in Austria).

== History ==
=== Coat-of-arms ===
The emblem represents three argent and sharp peaks, silhouetted against the azure sky and the vert grass, which symbolizes the position of the municipality. The coat of arms was granted in 1967.

== Society ==
=== Linguistic distribution ===
According to the 2024 census, 99.52% of the population speak German, 0.42% Italian and 0.05% Ladin as first language.

=== Demographic evolution ===
Historical population

Year	Pop.	±%
1860	?	—
1870	?	—
1880	1,498	—
1900	?	—
1910	1,449	—

Year	Pop.	±%
1921	1,585	+9.4%
1931	1,750	+10.4%
1936	1,711	−2.2%
1951	1,890	+10.5%
1961	2,141	+13.3%

Year	Pop.	±%
1971	2,197	+2.6%
1981	2,203	+0.3%
1991	2,171	−1.5%
2001	2,170	−0.0%

Source: Data from ISTAT

== See also ==
- Lake Kummersee
