= St. Martin in Passeier =

- Comune
- Gemeinde St. Martin in Passeier; Comune di San Martino in Passiria
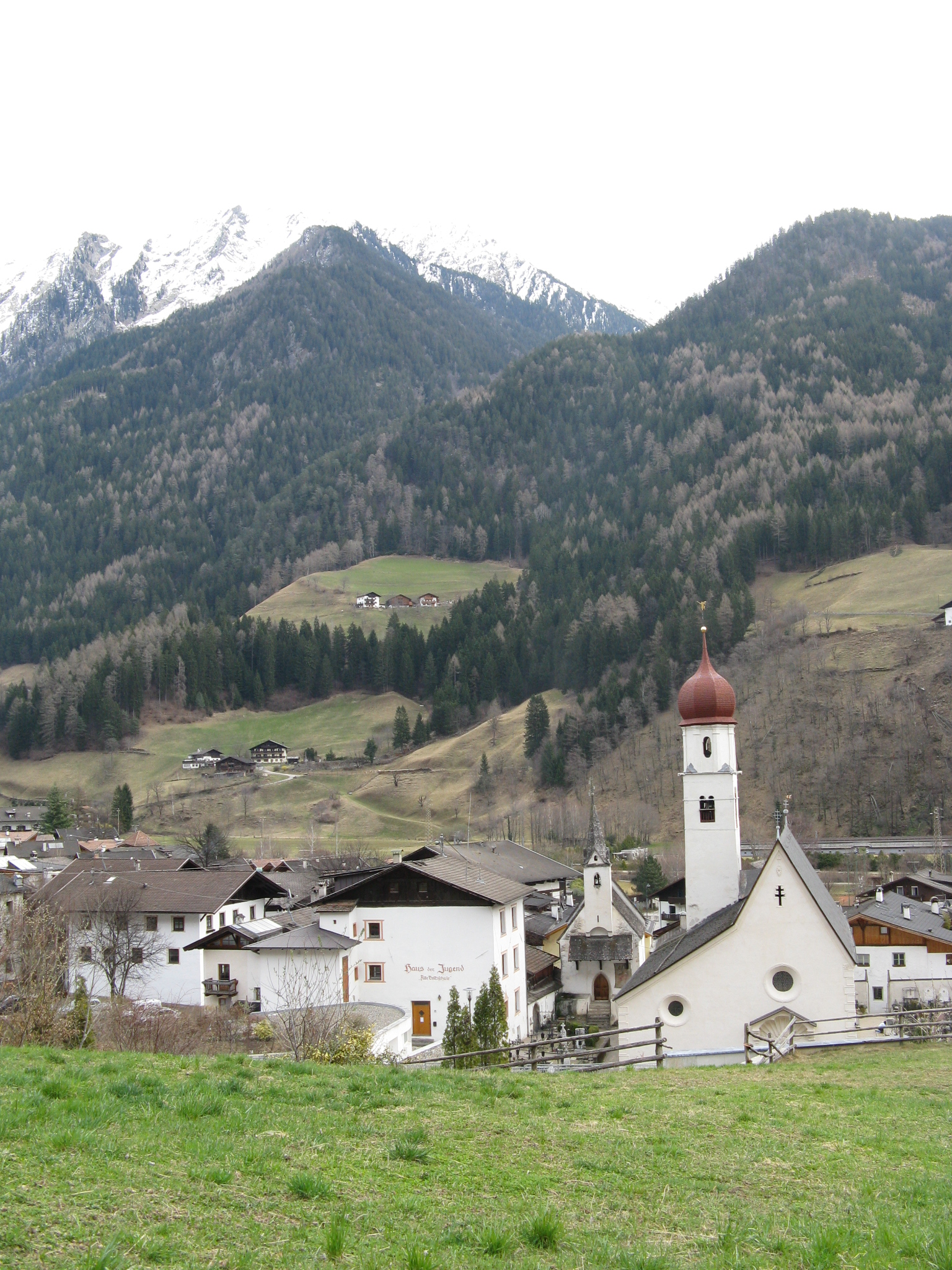
- St. Martin in Passeier with the parish church

- Location within Italy Location within Trentino-Alto Adige/Südtirol
- Coordinates: 46°47′N 11°14′E
- Country: Italy
- Region: Trentino-Alto Adige/Südtirol
- Province: South Tyrol (BZ)
- Frazioni: Saltaus (Saltusio), Quellenhof (Sorgente), Ried (Novale), Kalmtal (Valclava), Christl (Cresta), Flon (Vallone), Matatz (Montaccio)

Government
  - Mayor: Dominik Alber

Area
  - Total: 30.5 km^{2} (11.8 sq mi)
- Elevation: 600 m (2,000 ft)

Population (Nov. 3137)
  - Total: 3,137
  - Density: 103/km^{2} (266/sq mi)
- Demonym(s): German:St Martiner; Italian: di San Martino
- Time zone: UTC+1 (CET)
  - Summer (DST): UTC+2 (CEST)
- Postal code: 39010
- Dialing code: 0473
- Website: Official website

St. Martin in Passeier (German pronunciation: [saŋkt ˈmartɪn ʔɪn paˈsaɪɐ]; Italian: San Martino in Passiria [sam marˈtiːno im pasˈsiːrja]) is a comune (municipality) and a village in the Passeier Valley in South Tyrol, northern Italian, located about 35 kilometres (22 mi) northwest of Bolzano.

== Geography ==
As of 30 November 2010, it had a population of 3,137 and an area of 30.5 square kilometres (11.8 mi^{2}).

The municipality contains the frazioni (subdivisions, mainly villages and hamlets) Saltaus (Saltusio), Quellenhof (Sorgente), Ried (Novale), Kalmtal (Valclava), Christl (Cresta), Flon (Vallone), and Matatz (Montaccio),

St Martin in Passeier borders the following municipalities: Moos in Passeier, Riffian, and St Leonhard in Passeier.

== History ==
=== Coat-of-arms ===
The coat of arms is argent and azure party per pale; in the first part is an azure halberd, in the second half an argent wheel, with four rays. The halberd symbolizes the privileges of the free farmers, while the wheel the village laboriousness.

== Society ==
=== Linguistic distribution ===
According to the 2024 census, 98.77% of the population speak German, 1.16% Italian and 0.06% Ladin as first language.

=== Demographic evolution ===
Historical population

Year	Pop.	±%
1860	?	—
1870	?	—
1880	1,140	—
1900	?	—
1910	1,504	—

Year	Pop.	±%
1921	1,586	+5.5%
1931	1,750	+10.3%
1936	1,679	−4.1%
1951	1,758	+4.7%
1961	2,179	+23.9%

Year	Pop.	±%
1971	2,505	+15.0%
1981	2,681	+7.0%
1991	2,700	+0.7%
2001	2,832	+4.9%

Source: Data from ISTAT

== Tourism ==
In 2017 it was the venue for the Linuxbierwanderung.
