= Passeier Valley =

Valley in South Tyrol, Italy

Coordinates: 46°46′N 11°13′E

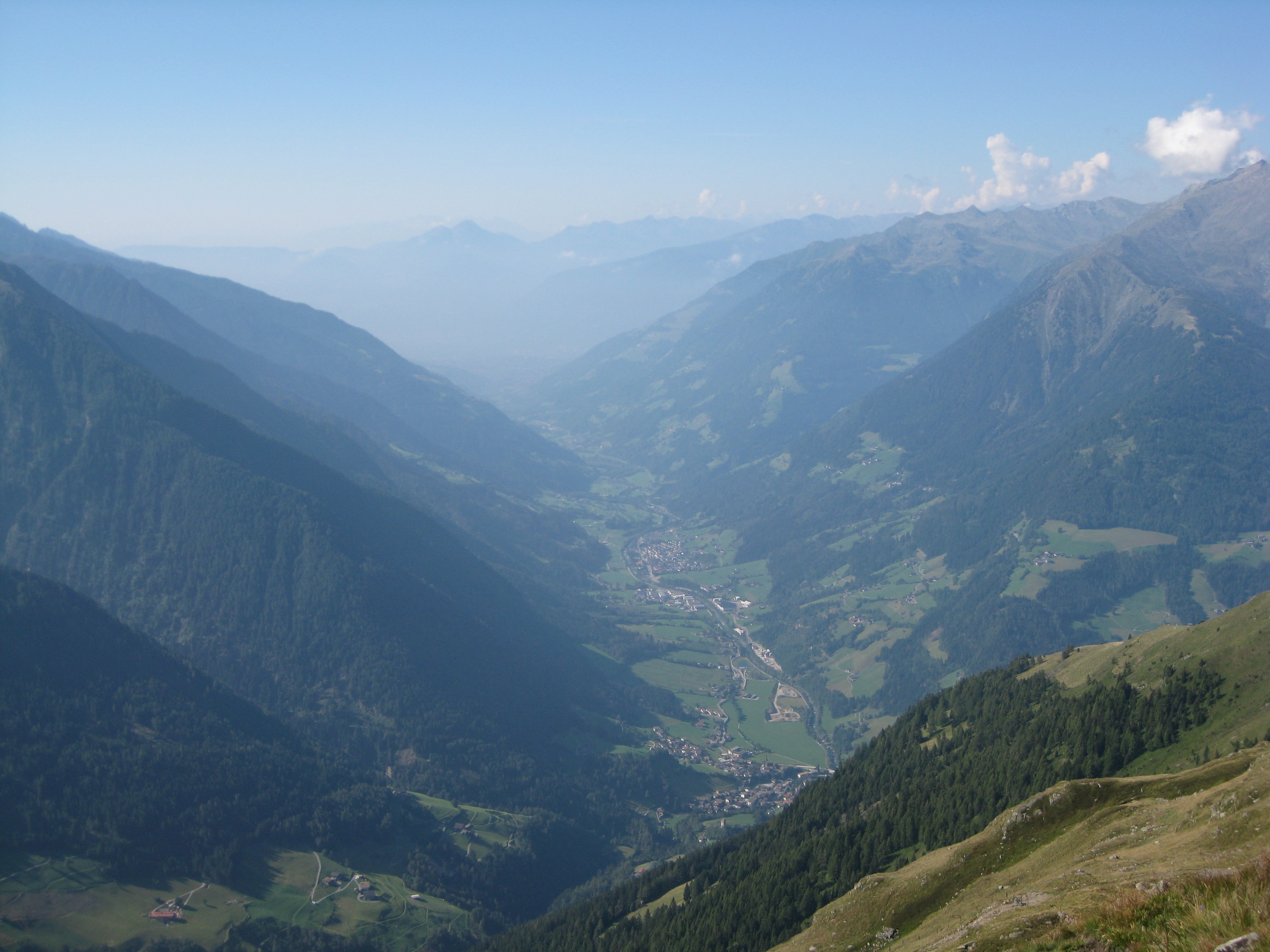
A view of the Passeier Valley

The Passeier Valley (German: Passeier or Passeiertal [paˈsaɪ̯ɐ]; Italian: Passiria or Val Passiria [pasˈsiːrja]) is the valley of the Passer river, in the mountains of South Tyrol, northern Italy. The Passer river is a left-bank tributary to the Adige. At the mouth of the valley, where the two rivers join, stands the town of Merano. From there, the valley runs north to the Timmelsjoch mountain pass, which leads to Sölden in the Ötztal valley of Austria and to the Jaufenpass which leads to Sterzing in the Wipptal.

The following municipalities are located in the valley: Kuens, Riffian, St. Martin in Passeier, St. Leonhard in Passeier and Moos in Passeier. The population of the valley speak German.

It has 300 days of sunshine p.a.
