= Lana, South Tyrol =

Lana
- Comune
- Marktgemeinde Lana; Comune di Lana
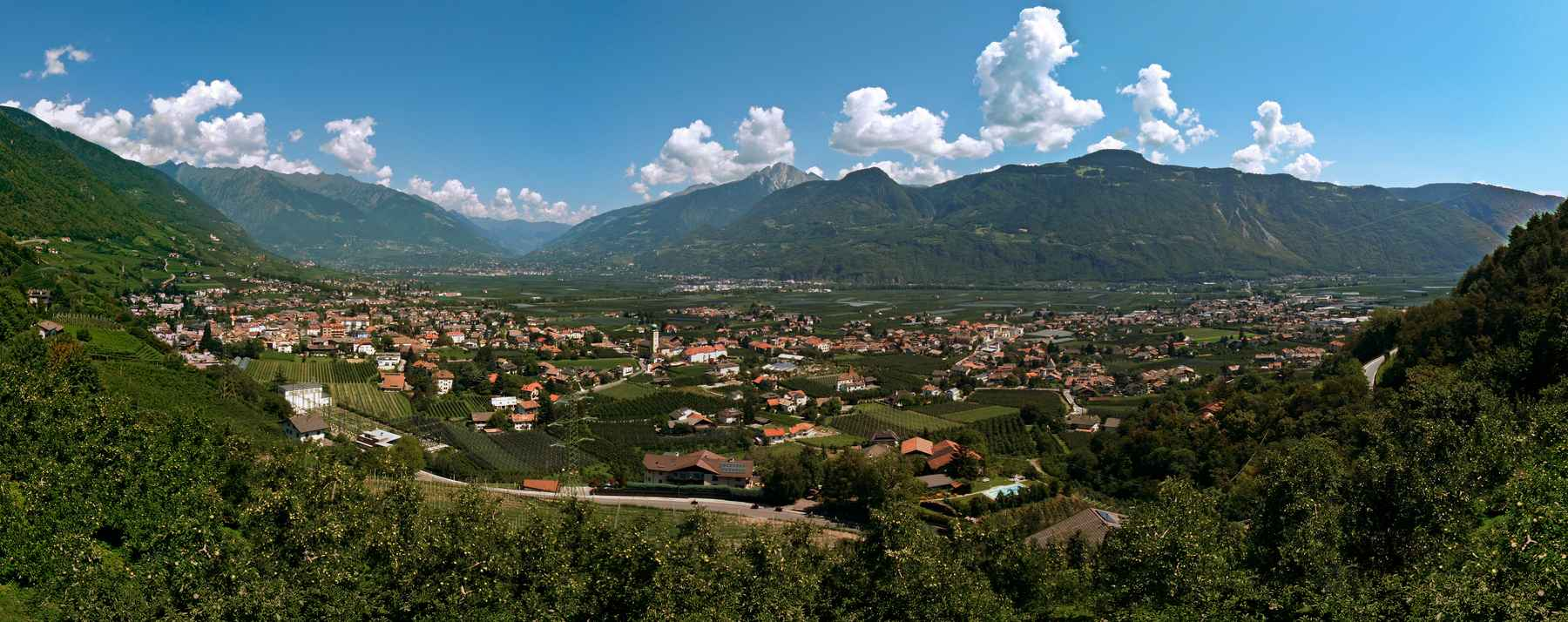
- View of Lana

- Coat of arms

- Location within Italy Location within Trentino-Alto Adige/Südtirol
- Coordinates: 46°37′N 11°09′E
- Country: Italy
- Region: Trentino-Alto Adige/Südtirol
- Province: South Tyrol (BZ)
- Frazioni: Fraktionen: Völlan (Foiana), Pawigl (Pavicolo), Ackpfeif (Acquaviva)

Government
  - Mayor: Helmut Taber (SVP)

Area
  - Total: 36 km^{2} (14 sq mi)
- Elevation: 310 m (1,020 ft)

Population (31-12-2025)
  - Total: 12,670
  - Density: 350/km^{2} (910/sq mi)
- Demonym(s): German: Lananer; Italian: lanensi
- Time zone: UTC+1 (CET)
  - Summer (DST): UTC+2 (CEST)
- Postal code: 39011
- Dialing code: 0473
- Website: Official website

Lana (Italian pronunciation: [ˈlaːna]; German pronunciation: [ˈlaːna]) is a comune (municipality) and a village in South Tyrol in northern Italy. It is situated in the Etschtal (Etsch Valley) between Bolzano and Merano and at the entrance to the Ultental. The population rose to 14,281 in 2025.

It is one of the three municipalities of South Tyrol whose name remained unchanged by the early 20th-century renaming programme which aimed at replacing mostly German place names with Italianised versions, the other two being Gais and Plaus.

== History ==
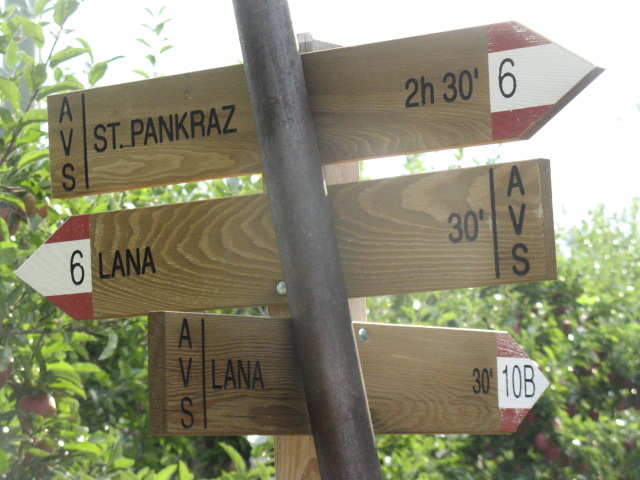
Signpost to Lana and St. Pankraz

=== Coat-of-arms ===
The emblem displays argent, a Teutonic cross sable, and a lion rampant gules over all. The lion is taken from the arms of the Counts of Brandis who played a role in the development of the village. The emblem was adopted in 1967.

== Society ==
=== Linguistic distribution ===
According to the 2024 census, 90.14% of Lana's population speak German, 9.53% Italian, and 0.32% Ladin as first language.

=== Demographic evolution ===
Historical population

Year	Pop.	±%
1860	?	—
1870	?	—
1880	3,439	—
1900	?	—
1910	4,100	—
1921	4,510	+10.0%

Year	Pop.	±%
1931	5,096	+13.0%
1936	5,393	+5.8%
1951	5,431	+0.7%
1961	5,950	+9.6%
1971	6,707	+12.7%
1981	7,706	+14.9%

Year	Pop.	±%
1991	8,631	+12.0%
2001	9,759	+13.1%
2010	?	—
2025	14,281	—

Source: Data from ISTAT

== Notable people ==
- Father Joseph Ohrwalder (1856 in Lana - 1913 in Sudan) a Roman Catholic priest, who was taken captive by the Mahdists in Sudan
- Robert Schälzky (1882 – 1948) was the 61st Grand Master of the Teutonic Order 1936 to 1948; he died in Lana
- Hans Andersag (1902–1955) a scientist who discovered chloroquine
- Karl Zuegg (1914 – 2005) an Italian entrepreneur, MD of the Lana fruit juice and jam company Zuegg, between 1940 and 1986
- Armin Zöggeler (born 1974) a retired Italian luger and double Olympic champion, he lives in Lana

== Economy ==
=== Tourism ===
Lana is a village which is divided into three parts: Oberlana, Mitterlana and Niederlana. It is a popular tourist spot offering sports such as tennis, football, golf, minigolf and ice-skating among others. During summer, locals and tourists alike enjoy swimming, hiking and cycling because there are a lot of good cycle paths.
