= List of castles in South Tyrol =

This is a list of castles in South Tyrol in Italy.

1. Castle Aichberg, Eppan an der Weinstraße
2. Altenburg bei St. Pauls, Eppan an der Weinstraße
3. Annaberg, Goldrain
4. Castle Auer, Tirol
5. Castleruine Boymont, Eppan an der Weinstraße
6. Castle Bruneck, Bruneck
7. Brunnenburg, Tirol
8. Churburg, Schluderns
9. Castle Enn, Montan
10. Castle Ehrenburg, Kiens
11. Castleruine Eschenloch, Ulten
12. Fahlburg, Tisens-Prissian
13. Castle Festenstein
14. Fingellerschlössl/Walbenstein, Sarntal
15. Fischburg, in Sëlva
16. Castle Freudenstein, Eppan an der Weinstraße
17. Fürstenburg, Mals
18. Castle Gandegg, Eppan an der Weinstraße
19. Castleruine Goien, Schenna
20. Castle Goldrain, Goldrain
21. Castle Gravetsch, Villanders
22. Castle Greifenstein, Terlan, (a.k.a. Sauschloss (Pig Castle))
23. Haderburg, Salorno
24. Haselburg, Bolzano
25. Castle Hauenstein, Seis am Schlern
26. Castle Hocheppan, Eppan an der Weinstraße
27. Johanneskofel, Sarntal
28. Castel Juval, Naturns
29. Castleruine Kaldiff, Neumarkt
30. Castle Karneid, Karneid
31. Castle Kasatsch, Nals, (a.k.a. Castle Pfefferberg)
32. Castle Kastelbell, Kastelbell-Tschars
33. Castle Katzenzungen, Tisens-Prissian
34. Castle Klebenstein, Bolzano
35. Castle Laimburg, Vadena
36. Castle Lamprechtsburg, Bruneck
37. Landesfürstliche Burg, Meran
38. Leuchtenburg, Italy, Vadena
39. Castle Lichtenberg, Prad am Stilfserjoch
40. Castle Lebenberg, Tscherms
41. Castle Maretsch, Bolzano
42. Marienberg, Mals (a former castle, now an abbey)
43. Castle Matschatsch, Eppan an der Weinstraße
44. Michelsburg, St. Lorenzen
45. Castle Moos, Eppan an der Weinstraße
46. Mühlbacher Klause, Mühlbach
47. Castle Neuhaus, Gais
48. Castle Neuhaus, Terlan (a.k.a. Castle Maultasch]
49. Castle Niemandsfreund, Kastelruth
50. Schloss Nussegg, Kurtatsch
51. Castle Obermontani, Morter
52. Castle Payrsberg, Nals
53. Castle Pienzenau, Meran
54. Prösels Castle, Völs am Schlern
55. Castleruine Rafenstein, Bolzano
56. Castle Reichenberg, Taufers im Münstertal
57. Castle Reifenegg, Ratschings
58. Reifenstein Castle, Sterzing
59. Castle Ried, Ritten
60. Castle Rodenegg, Rodeneck
61. Rotund, Taufers im Münstertal
62. Runkelstein Castle, Bolzano
63. Monastery Säben, earlier Castle Säben, Klausen
64. Castle Salegg, Seis am Schlern
65. Castle Schenna, Schenna
66. Schlandersburg, Schlanders
67. Castle Schöneck, Kiens
68. Castle Schwanburg, Nals
69. Sigmundskron Castle, a big fortress, Bolzano
70. Monastery Sonnenburg, earlier Castle Sonnenburg, St. Lorenzen
71. Castle Sprechenstein, Freienfeld/Sterzing
72. Castleruine Stein am Ritten, Ritten
73. Castle Stetteneck, Urtijëi
74. Castle Strassberg, Sterzing
75. Castle Summersberg, Gufidaun
76. Castle Tarantsberg
77. Castle Taufers, Sand in Taufers
78. Tirol Castle, Tirol
79. Castle Thurn, San Martin de Tor
80. Castle Thurnstein, Tirol
81. Trauttmansdorff Castle, Meran
82. Treuenstein Castle, Bozen/Bolzano
83. Trostburg, Waidbruck
84. Tschenglsburg, Tschengls
85. Unterkofeler Schlössl, Afing
86. Castle Untermontani, Morter
87. Castle Velthurns, Felthurns
88. Castle Wangen-Bellermont, Ritten
89. Castle Warth, Eppan an der Weinstraße
90. Wehrburg, Tisens
91. Castle Weineck, Bolzano
92. Castle Welsperg, Welsberg
93. Castle Wolfsthurn, Mareit
94. Castle Wolkenstein, Sëlva
95. Zenoburg, Meran
96. Castle Zwingenburg, Tisens

== See also ==
- List of castles in Italy
