= Sulden =

Mountain village in South Tyrol, Italy

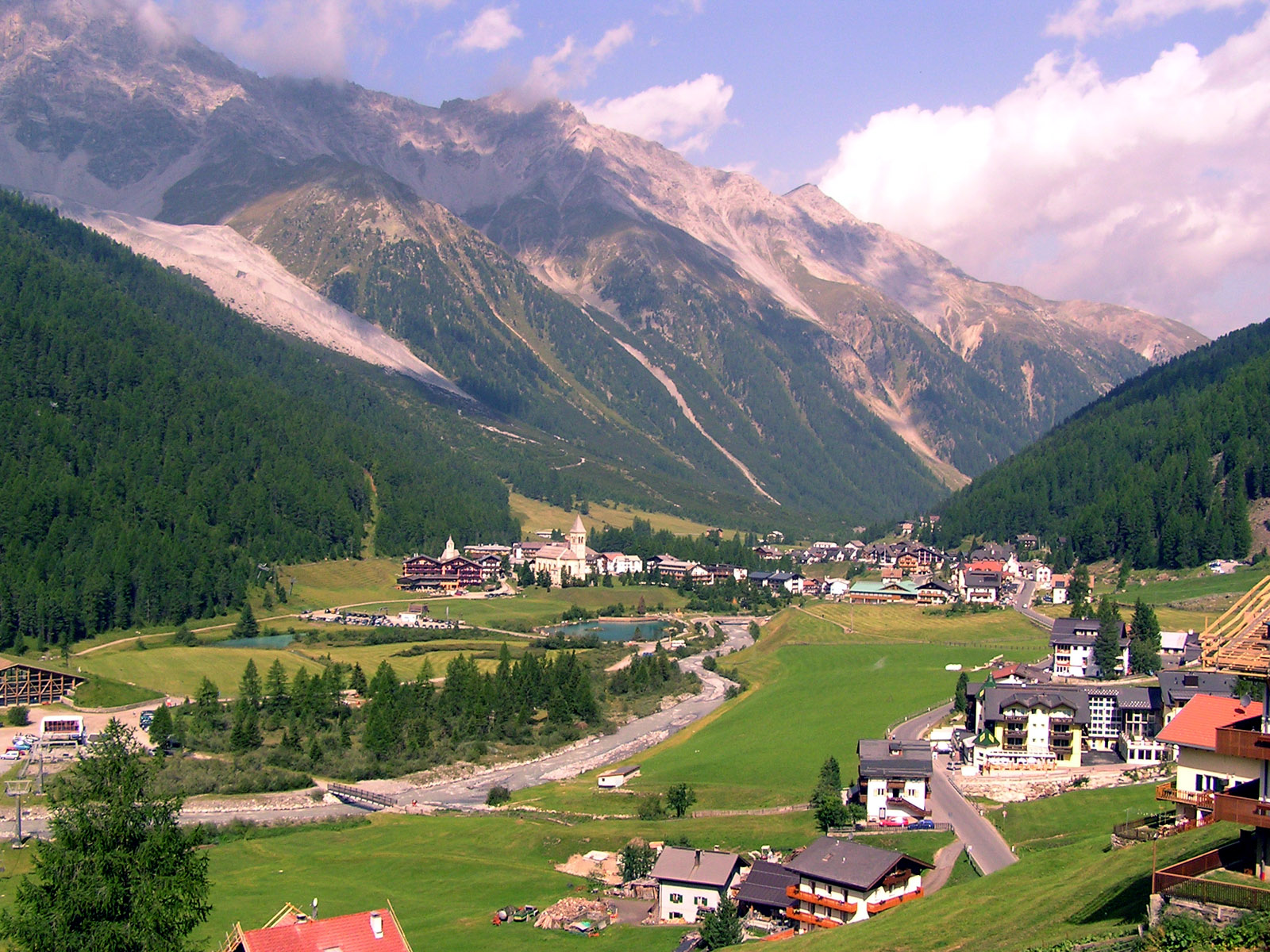
- Sulden in Summer 2005.
- Interactive map of Sulden
- Coordinates: 46°31′0″N 10°36′0″E
- Vertical: ?? m
- Top elevation: ?? m
- Base elevation: 1,906 m (6,253 ft)
- Skiable area: km^{2}
- Lift system: 11
- Lift capacity: ?? skiers/hr

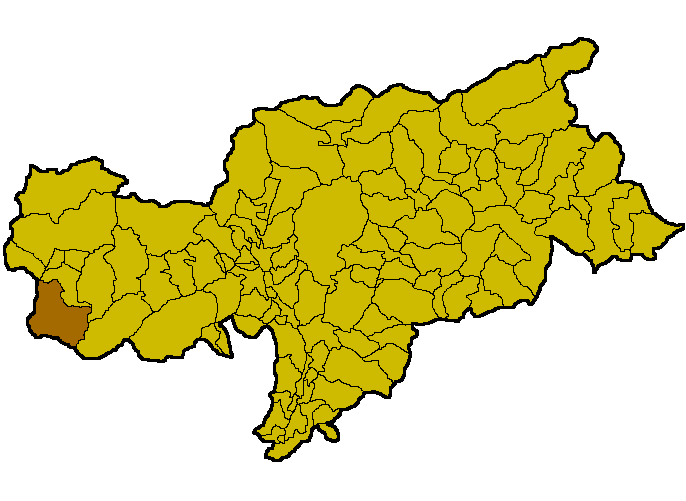
Map of South Tyrol showing Stilfs

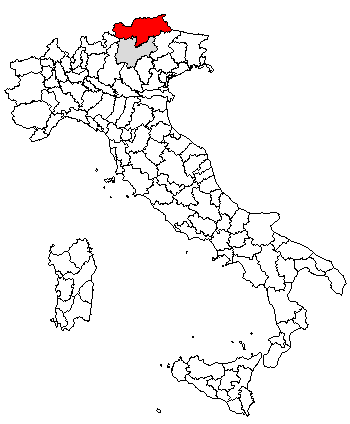
Location of South Tyrol in Italy

Sulden (German pronunciation: [ˈsʊldn̩]; Italian: Solda [ˈsɔlda]) is a mountain village in South Tyrol, northern Italy. It is a frazione of the comune of Stilfs.

== Geography ==
Sulden lies at the foot of the Ortler, in the Vinschgau valley east of the Stelvio Pass. It is 1900 m above sea level, with a population of 400.

=== Climate ===
Climate data for Sulden: 1905m (1990−2020 normals, extremes 1971−present)
| Month | Jan | Feb | Mar | Apr | May | Jun | Jul | Aug | Sep | Oct | Nov | Dec | Year |
|---|---|---|---|---|---|---|---|---|---|---|---|---|---|
| Record high °C (°F) | 11.0 (51.8) | 19.0 (66.2) | 16.0 (60.8) | 18.0 (64.4) | 23.1 (73.6) | 28.6 (83.5) | 27.2 (81.0) | 28.0 (82.4) | 28.0 (82.4) | 22.0 (71.6) | 16.0 (60.8) | 12.0 (53.6) | 28.6 (83.5) |
| Mean daily maximum °C (°F) | −0.2 (31.6) | 0.9 (33.6) | 3.8 (38.8) | 7.0 (44.6) | 11.8 (53.2) | 15.9 (60.6) | 18.6 (65.5) | 17.7 (63.9) | 13.0 (55.4) | 8.9 (48.0) | 3.2 (37.8) | −0.1 (31.8) | 8.4 (47.1) |
| Daily mean °C (°F) | −4.7 (23.5) | −4.0 (24.8) | −1.4 (29.5) | 1.9 (35.4) | 6.5 (43.7) | 10.2 (50.4) | 12.4 (54.3) | 12.1 (53.8) | 8.0 (46.4) | 4.3 (39.7) | −1.0 (30.2) | −4.2 (24.4) | 3.3 (38.0) |
| Mean daily minimum °C (°F) | −9.2 (15.4) | −9.0 (15.8) | −6.6 (20.1) | −3.1 (26.4) | 1.2 (34.2) | 4.5 (40.1) | 6.3 (43.3) | 6.4 (43.5) | 2.9 (37.2) | −0.4 (31.3) | −5.1 (22.8) | −8.4 (16.9) | −1.7 (28.9) |
| Record low °C (°F) | −24.0 (−11.2) | −23.0 (−9.4) | −24.0 (−11.2) | −14.0 (6.8) | −13.0 (8.6) | −7.0 (19.4) | −2.0 (28.4) | −4.0 (24.8) | −8.0 (17.6) | −13.0 (8.6) | −18.0 (−0.4) | −21.8 (−7.2) | −24.0 (−11.2) |
| Average precipitation mm (inches) | 26.9 (1.06) | 22.0 (0.87) | 36.7 (1.44) | 63.9 (2.52) | 76.5 (3.01) | 108.0 (4.25) | 108.0 (4.25) | 109.4 (4.31) | 90.2 (3.55) | 93.8 (3.69) | 75.5 (2.97) | 40.4 (1.59) | 851.3 (33.51) |
| Average precipitation days (≥ 1.0 mm) | 4.9 | 4.9 | 6.3 | 9.2 | 11.0 | 12.9 | 12.1 | 11.9 | 9.1 | 9.4 | 7.9 | 6.2 | 105.8 |
Source: Landeswetterdienst Südtirol

== History ==
Due to its remote location, in AD 1802, the Austrian newspaper "Innsbrucker Wochenblatt" compared it to "Siberia of Tyrol", "where farmers dine with bears and kids ride on wolves".

Tourism changed this, as Sulden now has 2000 beds and eleven skilifts, part of Ortler Skiarena.

== Language ==
Sulden is located in the northeast Italian region of Trentino Alto Adige in the province of South Tyrol. This small province has been part of Austria until the World War I, when it passed to Italy. Because of its political past, the languages spoken in this region are German, Italian and Ladin.

== Famous residents ==
Reinhold Messner owns a herd of yaks there, and also the Ortler branch of the Messner Mountain Museum.

Reinhold Messner was born in 1944, in Brixen. Messner was the first person in the world to climb all the 14 eight thousanders without the need of oxygen masks. The eight thousanders are the 14 highest mountains on earth, located in Asia on the Himalayan and Karakoram mountain ranges. They include mountains such as the Mount Everest, K2 and Makalu. Messner has written many biographies and travel guides but also worked as co-producer for some films. Messner now lives in Juval Castle and in the recent years has opened 6 museums.
