= Kronplatz (Plan de Corones) =

Mountain in Italy

- Plan de Corones
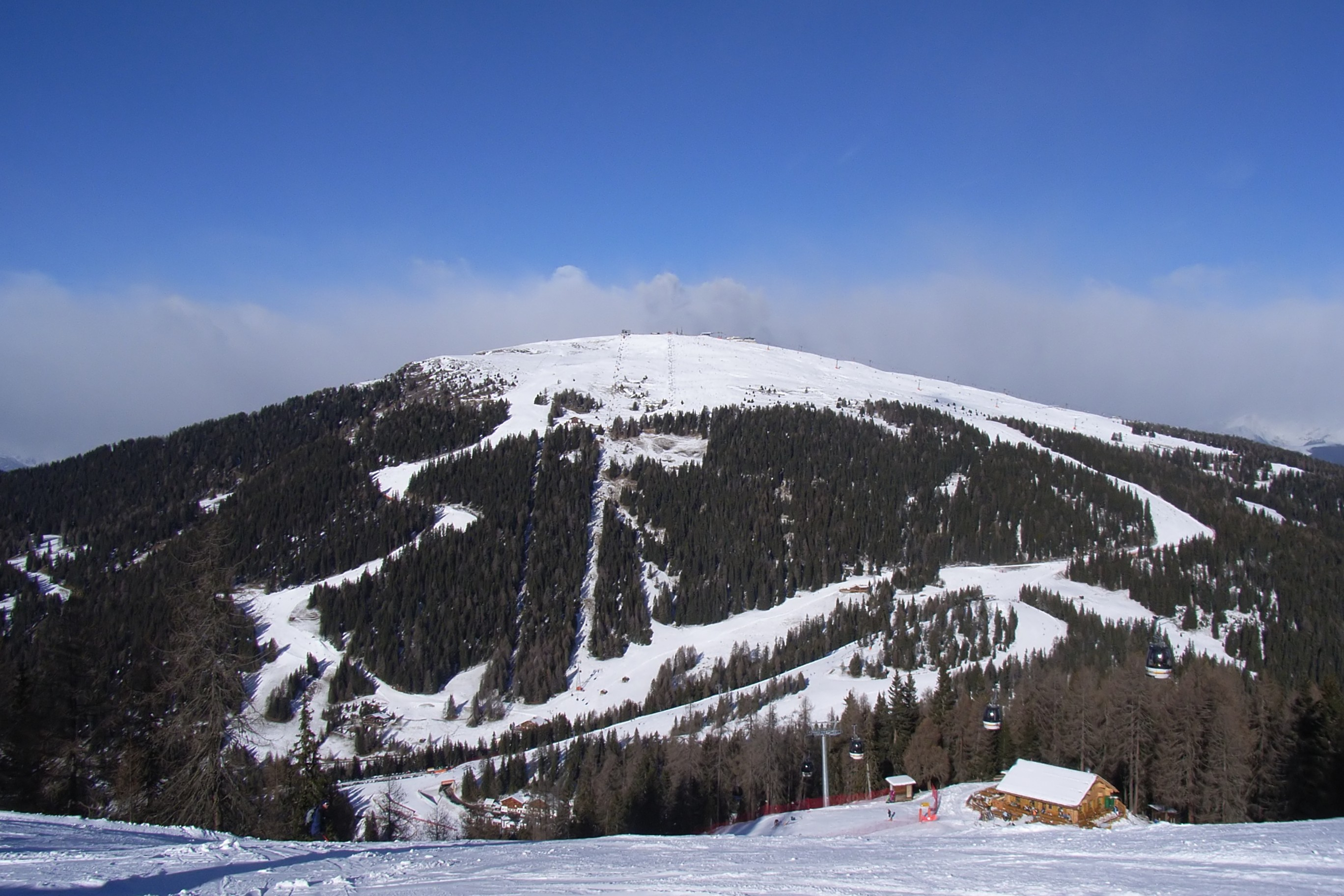
- Kronplatz in March 2007

Highest point
- Elevation: 2,275 m (7,464 ft)
- Coordinates: 46°44′17″N 11°57′36″E

Geography
- Location within Alps
- Location: South Tyrol, Italy
- Parent range: Dolomites

The Kronplatz (Ladin and Italian: Plan de Corones) is a mountain of the Dolomites in South Tyrol, northern Italy, with a summit elevation of 2,275 metres (7,464 ft) above sea level.

Kronplatz is not only the name of the mountain but of the whole holiday region. The holiday region of Kronplatz comprises the Puster Valley and some side valleys such as Ahrntal/Valle Aurina, Gsieser Tal/Val Casies, Antholzertal/Valle di Anterselva and part of Gadertal/Val Badia.

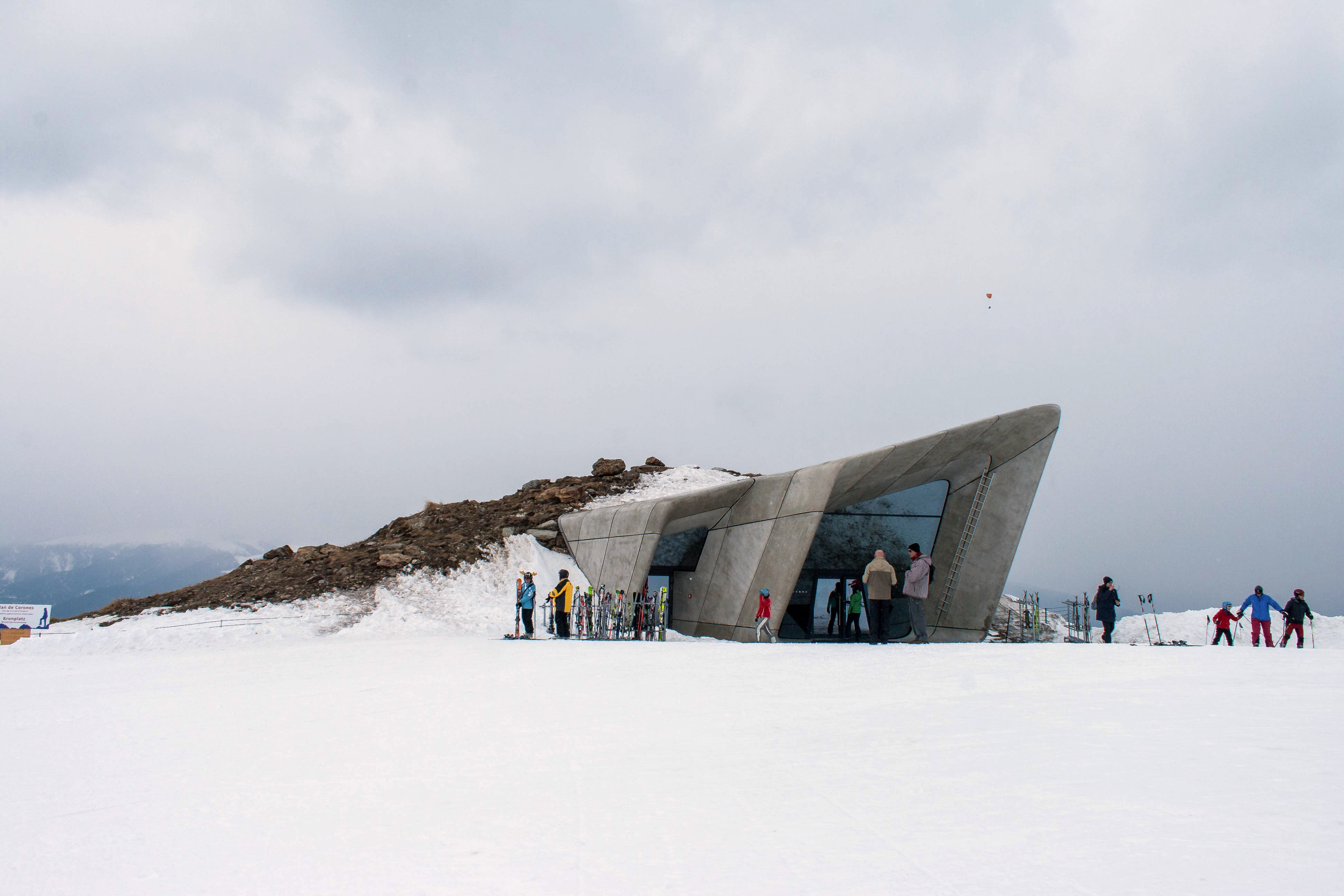
Messner Mountain Museum.

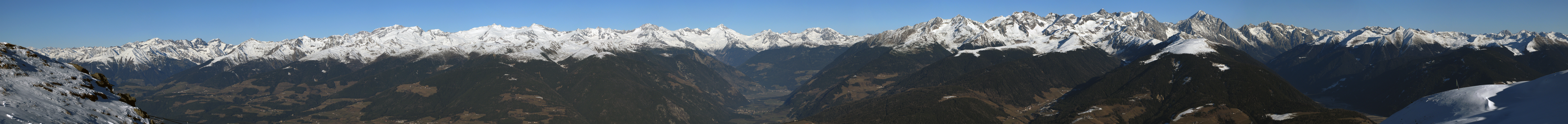
Panoramic view of Plan de Corones

In the winter it is a ski resort, with five black pistes: Erta, Herrnegg, Piculin, Pre da Peres and Sylvester. Some of the lifts remain open in the summer for other activities such as walking, climbing and mountain biking.

- 31 lifts
- 1,375 m (4,511 ft) of vertical descent
- 60 pistes (121 km (75 miles))
- 292 snow guns
