= Latsch =

- Comune
- Gemeinde Latsch; Comune di Laces
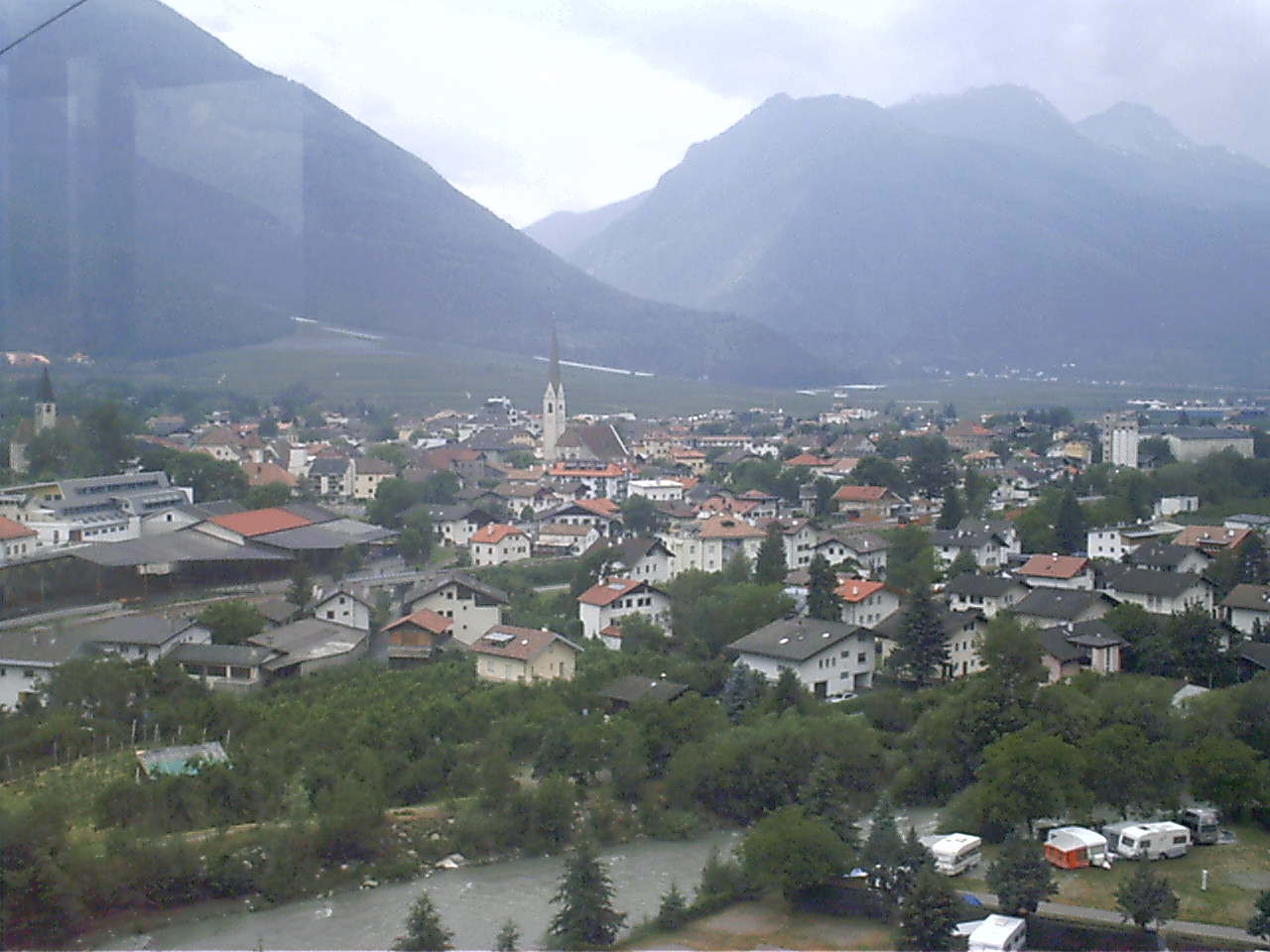
- View of Latsch

- Location within Italy Location within Trentino-Alto Adige/Südtirol
- Coordinates: 46°37′N 10°52′E
- Country: Italy
- Region: Trentino-Alto Adige/Südtirol
- Province: South Tyrol (BZ)
- Frazioni: Goldrain (Coldrano), Morter, St. Martin am Kofel (San Martino al Monte), Tarsch (Tarres)

Government
  - Mayor: Mauro Dalla Barba (SVP)

Area
  - Total: 78.8 km^{2} (30.4 sq mi)

Population (Nov. 2010)
  - Total: 5,156
  - Density: 65.4/km^{2} (169/sq mi)
- Demonym(s): German:Latscher; Italian: lacesini
- Time zone: UTC+1 (CET)
  - Summer (DST): UTC+2 (CEST)
- Postal code: 39021
- Dialing code: 0473
- Website: Official website

Latsch (German pronunciation: [latʃ]; Italian: Laces [ˈlaːtʃes]) is a comune (municipality) and a village in the province of South Tyrol in northern Italy, located about 40 kilometres (25 mi) northwest of the city of Bolzano.

== Geography ==
As of 30 November 2010, it had a population of 5,156 and an area of 78.8 square kilometres (30.4 mi^{2}).

Latsch (Laces) borders the following municipalities: Kastelbell-Tschars, Martell, Schnals, Schlanders, and Ulten.

=== Frazioni ===
The municipality of Latsch contains the frazioni (subdivisions, mainly villages and hamlets) Goldrain (Coldrano), Morter, St. Martin am Kofel (San Martino al Monte) and Tarsch (Tarres).

== Gallery ==
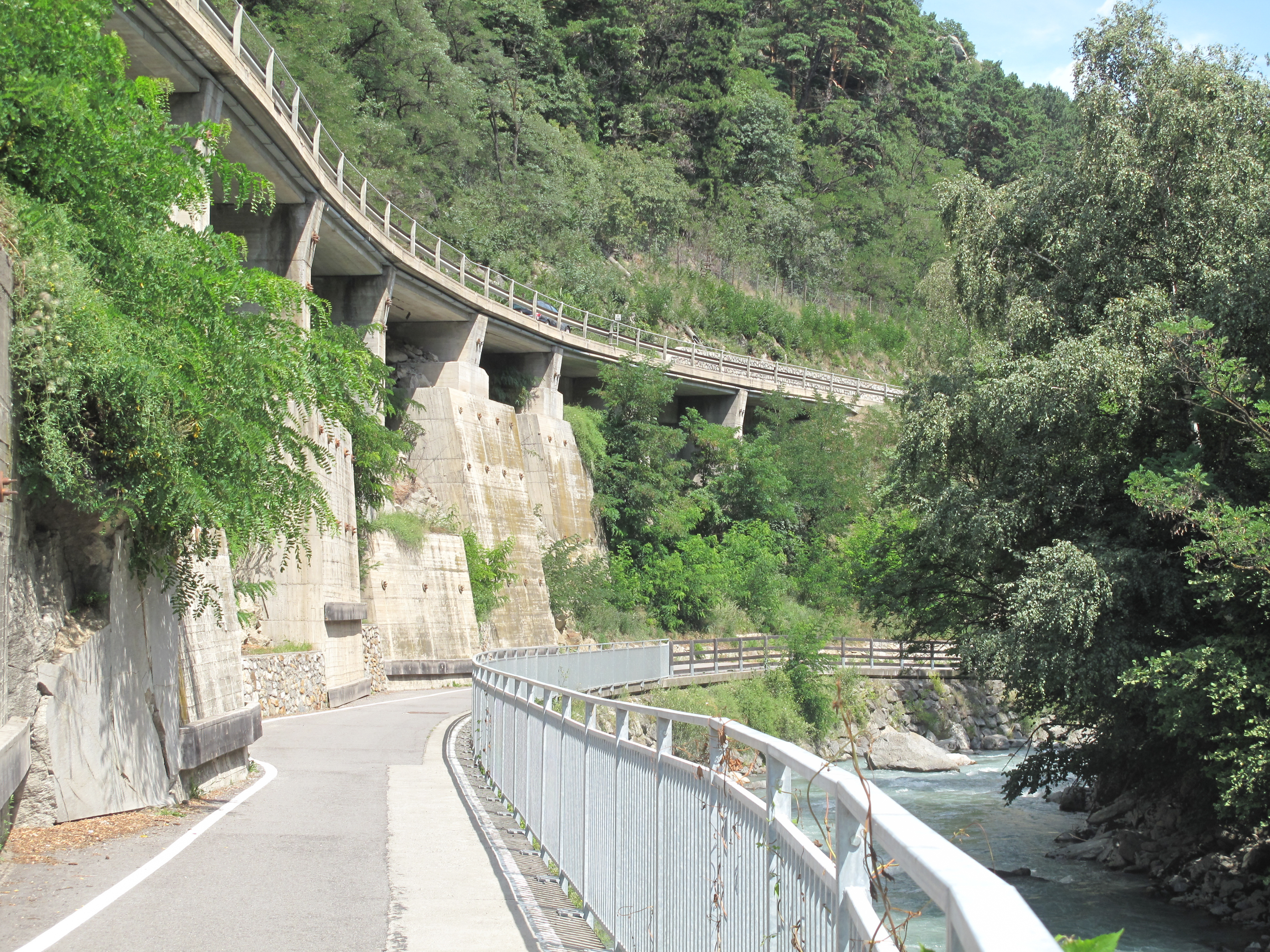
Road panorama between Latsch and Kastelbell

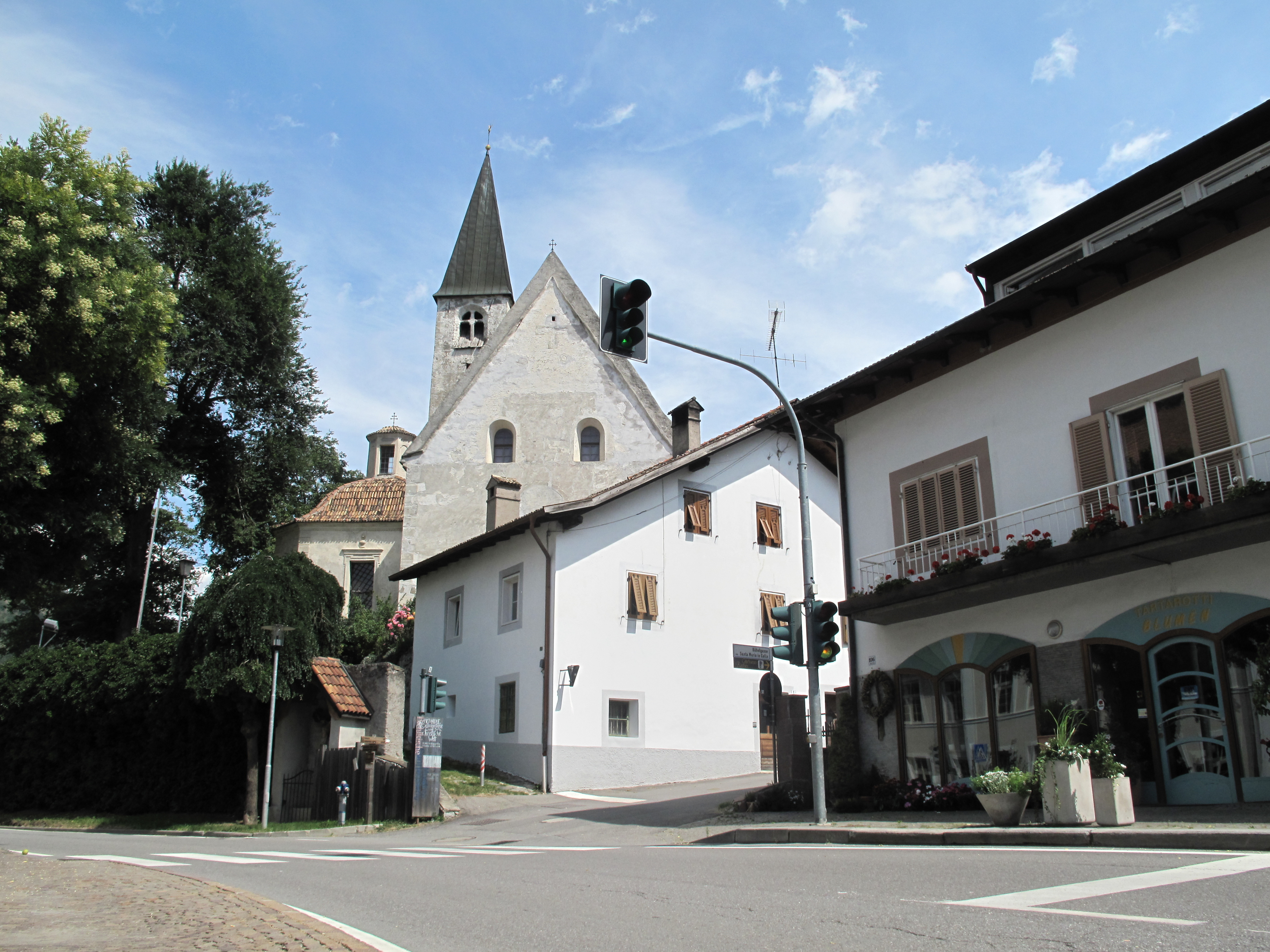
The church Unsere Liebe Frau auf dem Bichl (Our Lady on the Hill)

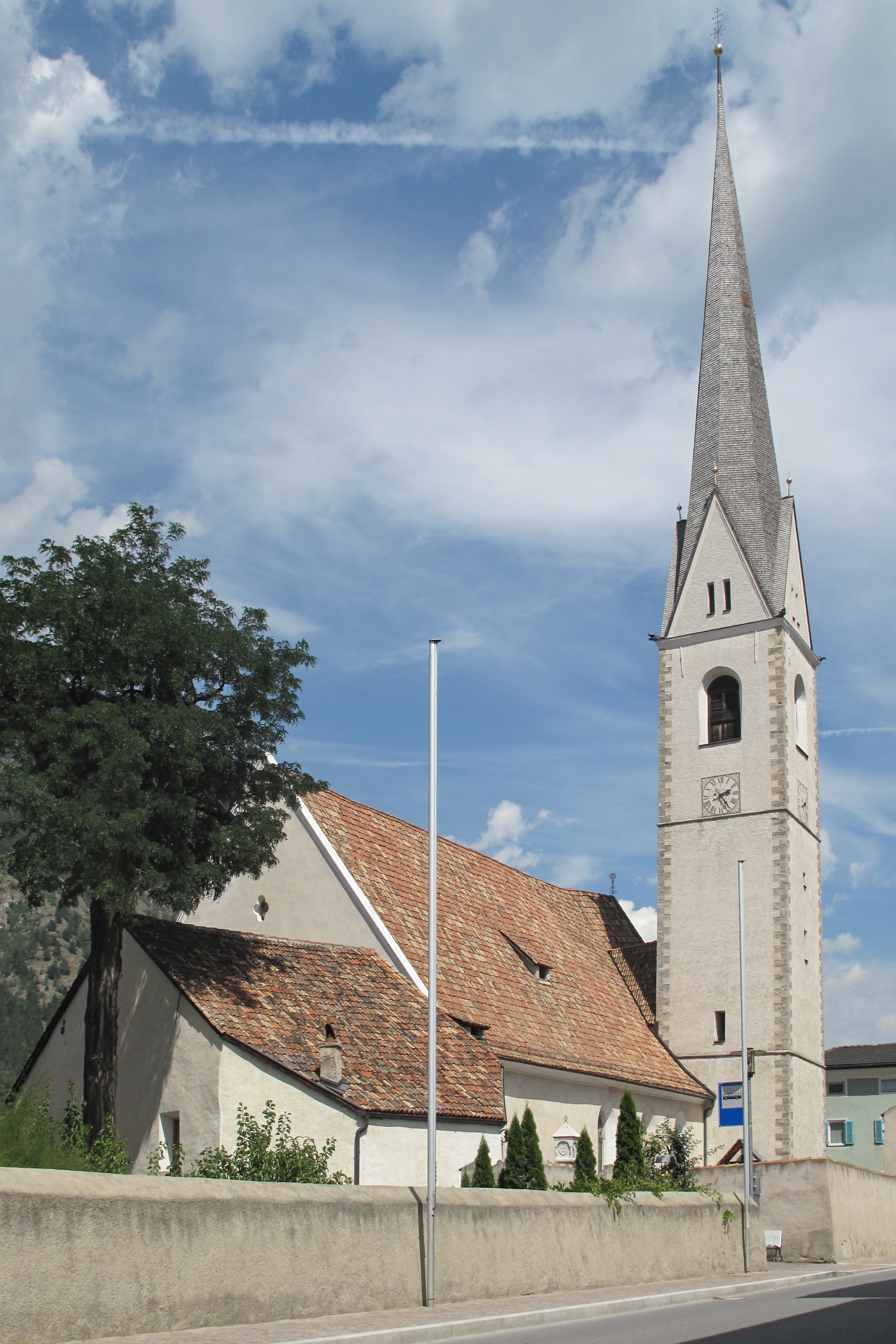
Saints Peter and Paul Parish Church

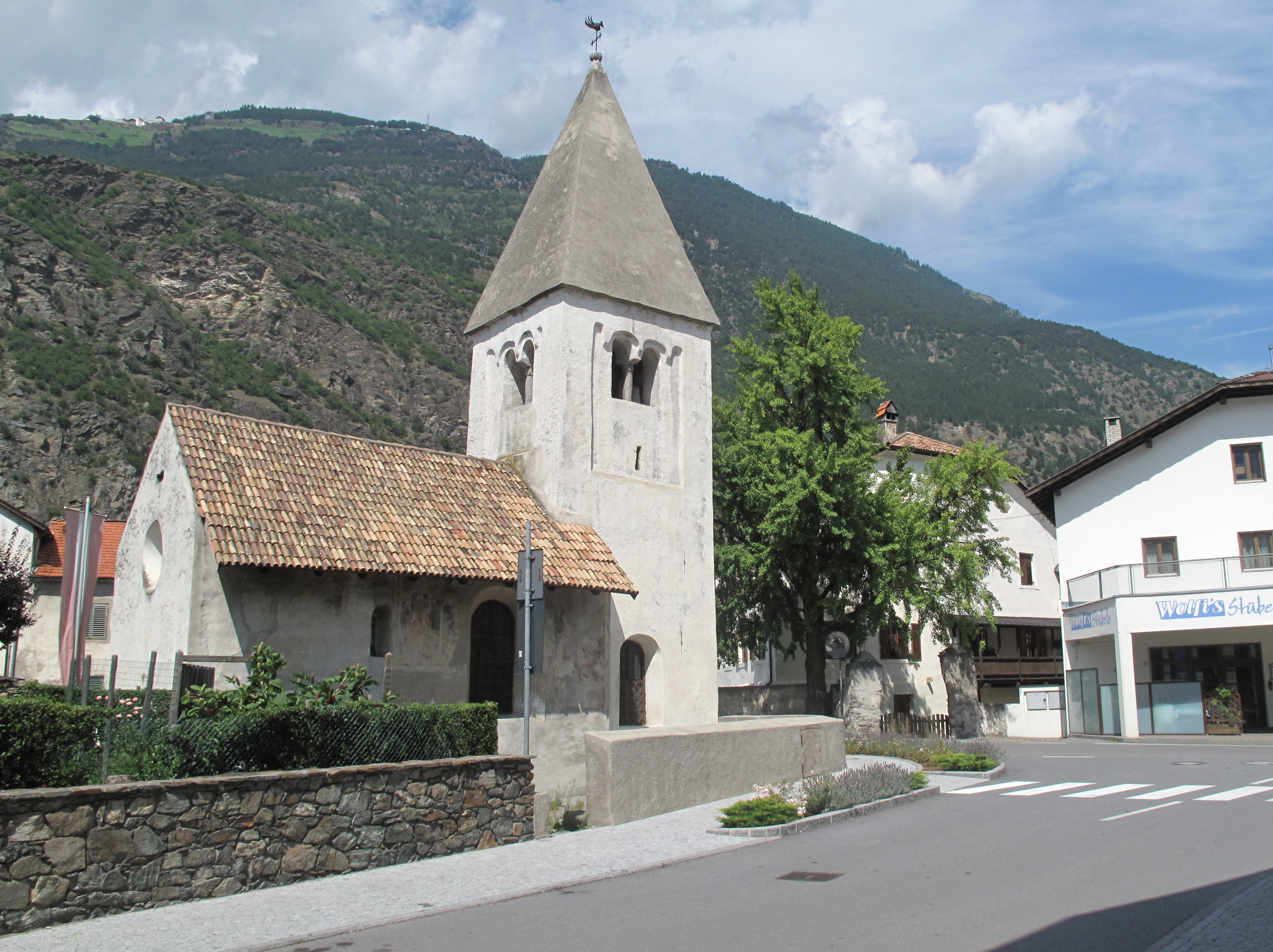
Saint Nicholas

== History ==
=== Coat-of-arms ===
The emblem represents a vert centered branch, with three roses of gules and or petal in the center. It is the sign of the Lords of Annenberg owners, from 1312 to 1695, of the castle. The coat of arms was granted in 1930.

== Notable people ==
- Manfred Fuchs (1938 in Latsch – 2014) entrepreneur and space pioneer

== Society ==
=== Linguistic distribution ===
According to the 2024 census, 96.55% of the population speak German, 3.38% Italian and 0.06% Ladin as first language.

=== Demographic evolution ===
Historical population

Year	Pop.	±%
1860	?	—
1870	?	—
1880	2,390	—
1900	?	—
1910	2,479	—

Year	Pop.	±%
1921	2,729	+10.1%
1931	2,938	+7.7%
1936	3,139	+6.8%
1951	3,063	−2.4%
1961	3,426	+11.9%

Year	Pop.	±%
1971	3,629	+5.9%
1981	3,862	+6.4%
1991	4,320	+11.9%
2001	4,870	+12.7%

Source: Data from ISTAT
