= Prösels Castle =

Coordinates: 46°30′20″N 11°29′44″E

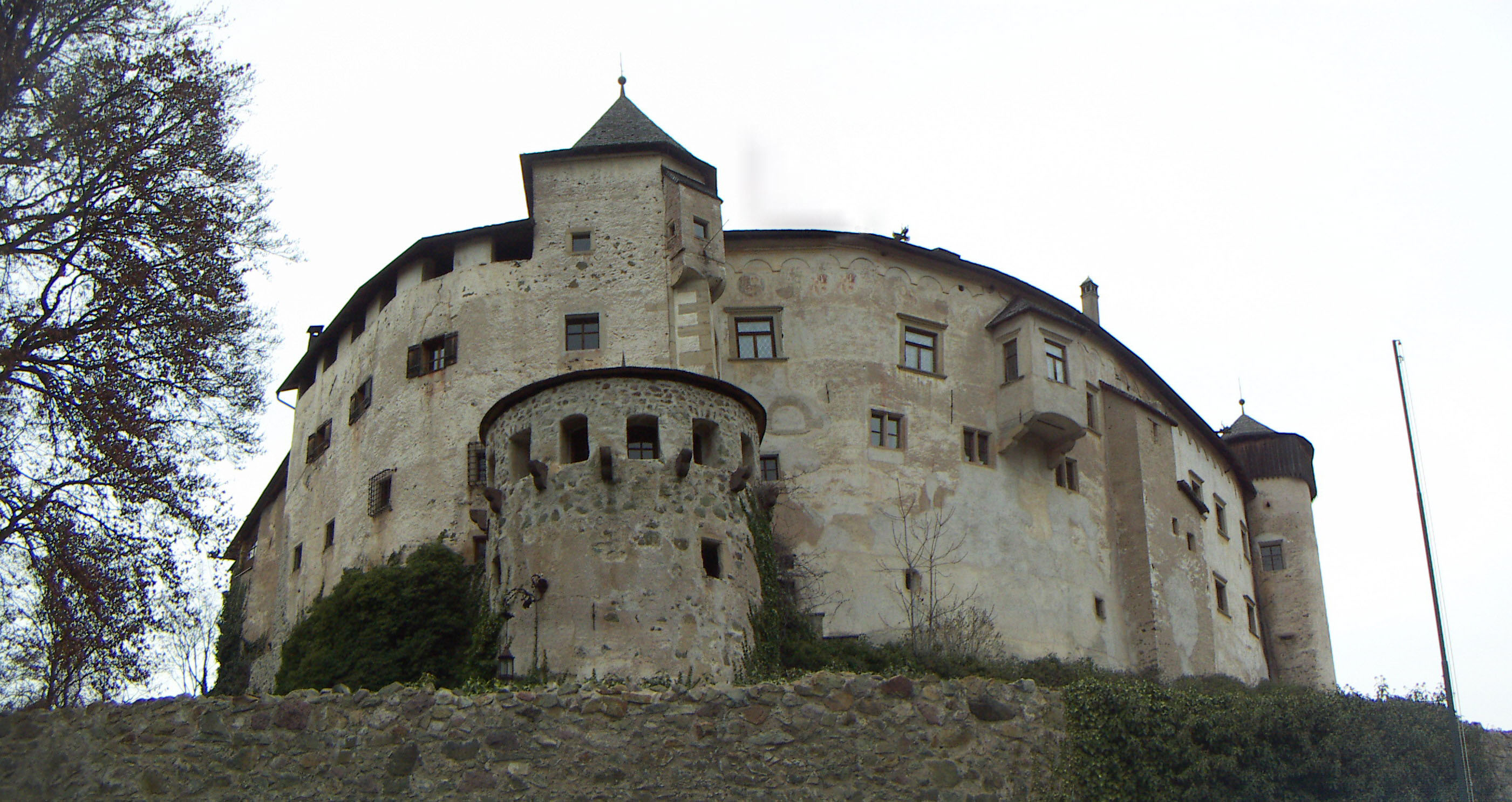
Prösels Castle

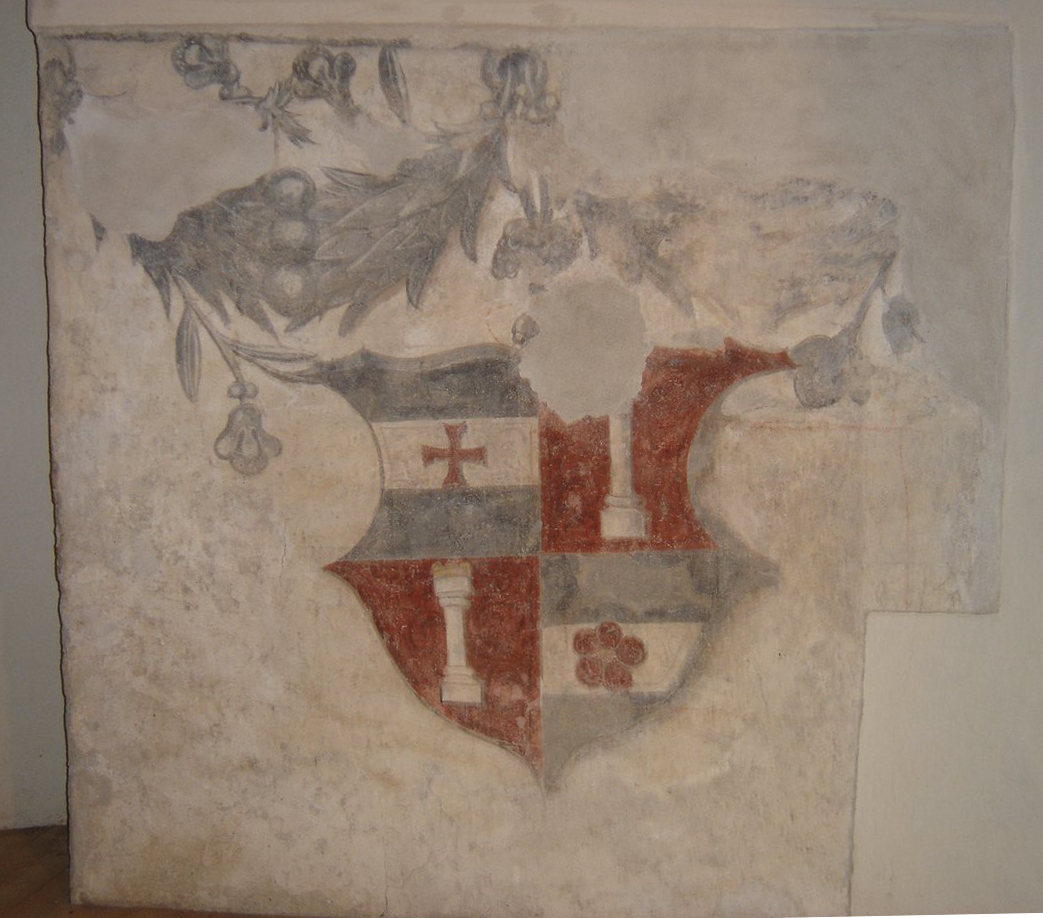
The family coats of arms depicted in a fresco in the castle. The column on a red background in two of the quarters is that of the powerful Roman Colonna family and was introduced by Leonhard von Völs (1458–1530) who claimed membership of the family and styled himself Leonhard Colonna, barone di Fiè. (See storiaital.pdf (in Italian), from the castle’s website)

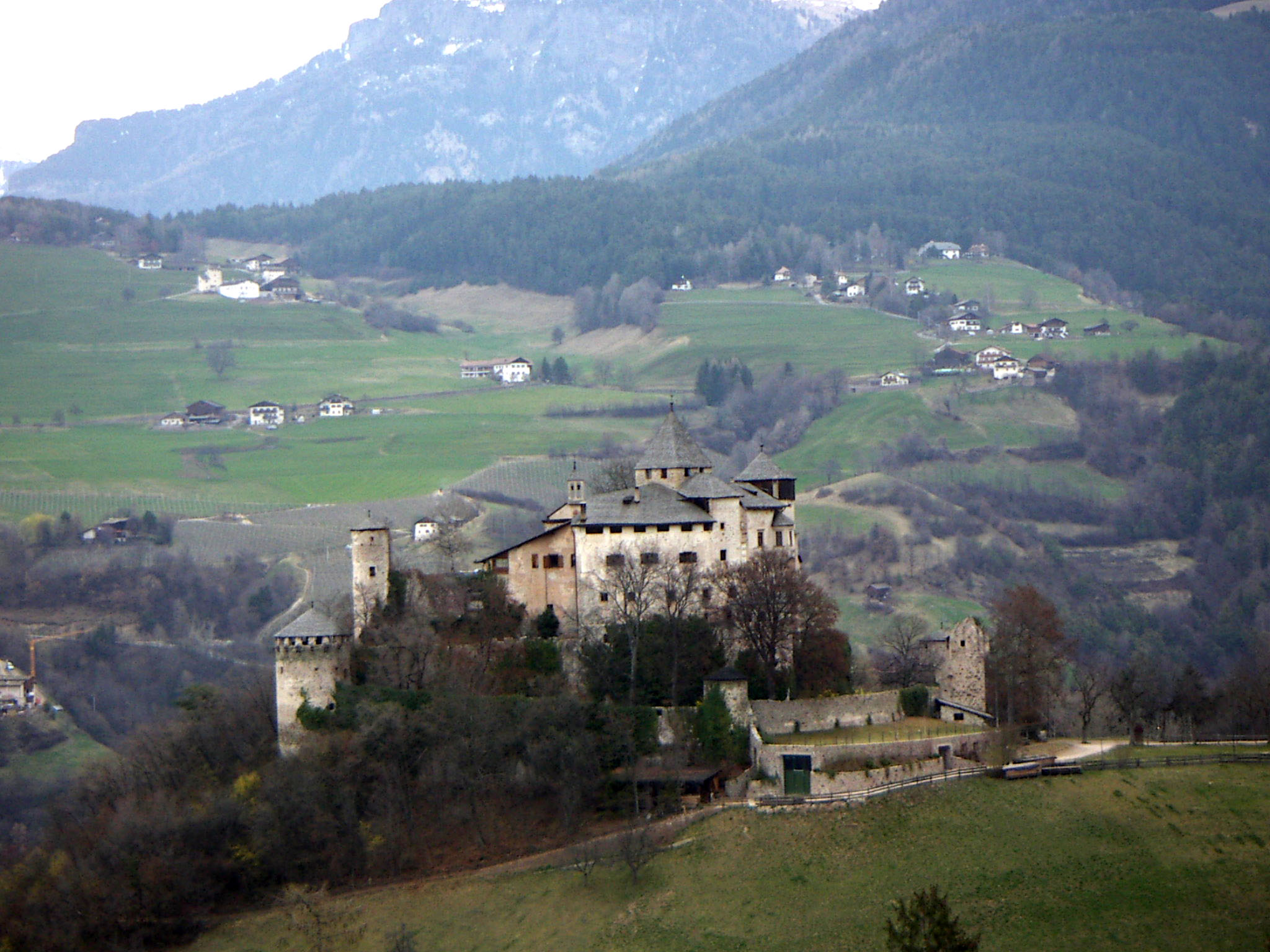
Prösels Castle

Prösels Castle (German: Schloss Prösels; Italian: Castello di Presule) is a castle in the Gothic style which stands on the high plain below the Schlern mountain, in South Tyrol. Prösels is a location within the municipal boundaries of the commune of Völs am Schlern (Fiè allo Sciliar).

== History ==
The castle was first named in a document from 1279, as castrum Presil, whereas the settlement close to the castle compares in 1373 as Bresels. It is believed that the lords of Völs, feudatories of the Bishopric of Brixen, had built the castle here just by 1200. Today the central palace with a Romanesque archway are surviving parts of this first fortress.

In Italian it is sometimes called Castel Colonna, reflecting the fact that around the time of Leonhard II the Völs (Fiè) family started to add the Colonna family name to their own. The reason for this is unclear, although a number of hypotheses have been advanced. According to some the family originated as a branch of the Colonnas who came to Tyrol in the twelfth century; others believe that Leonhard II, fighting alongside Marcantonio Colonna (1535–1584) at the Battle of Lepanto, was affirming his family’s origins in the Colonnas of Tusculum. A third version speculates that Marcantonio adopted Leonhard in order to enable the latter to display his membership of the noble Roman dynasty. Most probably, perhaps, Leonhard II simply requested and obtained the right to add the name Colonna to his own.

The Gothic castle of today was built by Leonhard of Völs (born 1458). He was the administrator of the salt mines of Hall in Tirol, a highly profitable position, furthermore he was married three times to wealthy noblewomen, which enabled him to spend extravagantly on the expansion of his castle. In 1498 Leonhard, thanks to his friendship with the Holy Roman Emperor Maximilian I and Archduke of Austria, became governor of the County of Tyrol. Leonhard showed his gratitude by including the emperor on one of the frescoes in the newly built arcade of his castle.

During the Peasants' War of 1525 the castle was briefly occupied by the revolting subservient farmers, who burnt all the documents in the vain hope of destroying all proof of their debts and tithes. The uprising was squashed and six leaders executed. Leonhard of Völs also instigated the burning of nine local woman for witchcraft. To deflect blame placed on him by his subjects for a high infant mortality rate, Leonhard found nine women, had them tortured and after they confessed burnt at the stake for witchcraft. Most probably the high infant mortality was due to the farmers being starved and very poor owing to Leonhard's very high taxes. The woman confessed that they had "stolen the babies and ridden on their brooms to the Schlern where they had eaten the babies together with the devil." The many local legends about the so-called Schlernhexen (Schlern witches) date back to this time.

The castle remained in the hands of the family until its last member, Felix, Freiherr von Völs, died childless in 1810. For the next 50 years the castle stood empty and nearly fell into ruins. Between 1860 and 1978 the castle changed hands no fewer than 14 times, suffering periods of decay followed by attempted restoration before finally being abandoned to its fate. However, in 1981 the Kuratorium Schloss Prösels (Prösels Castle Curatorship) was formed to restore the building; the work was completed the following year.

== Visiting the castle ==
Guided visits are available during the summer months and during the Christmas holidays, various cultural events are held here including concerts, exhibitions and theatrical performances. Permanent displays include:

- A collection of weapons and suits of armour
- The "Batzenhäusl" restaurant collection of paintings (The "Batzenhäusl" being the oldest restaurant in the city of Bolzano)
- A modern art collection

== See also ==
- List of castles in South Tyrol
- Late Middle Ages
- Fortification
- Medieval architecture

== Gallery ==
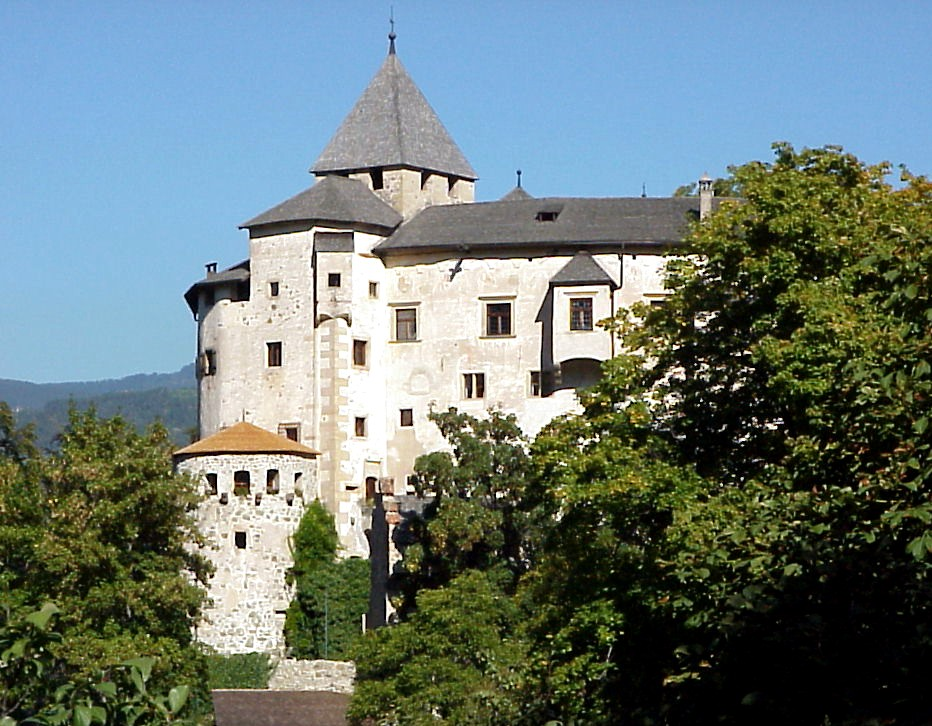
Prösels Castle

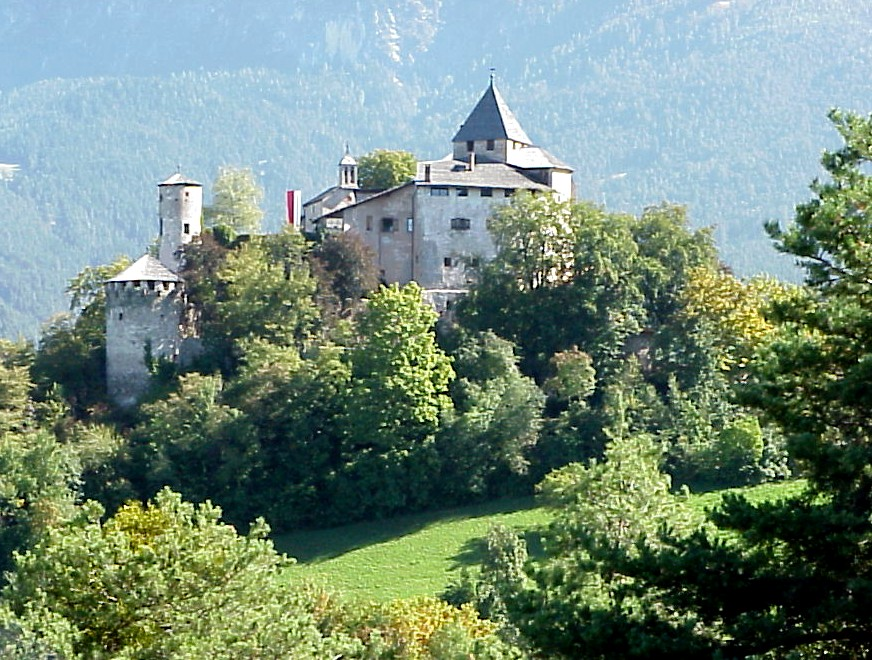
Prösels Castle

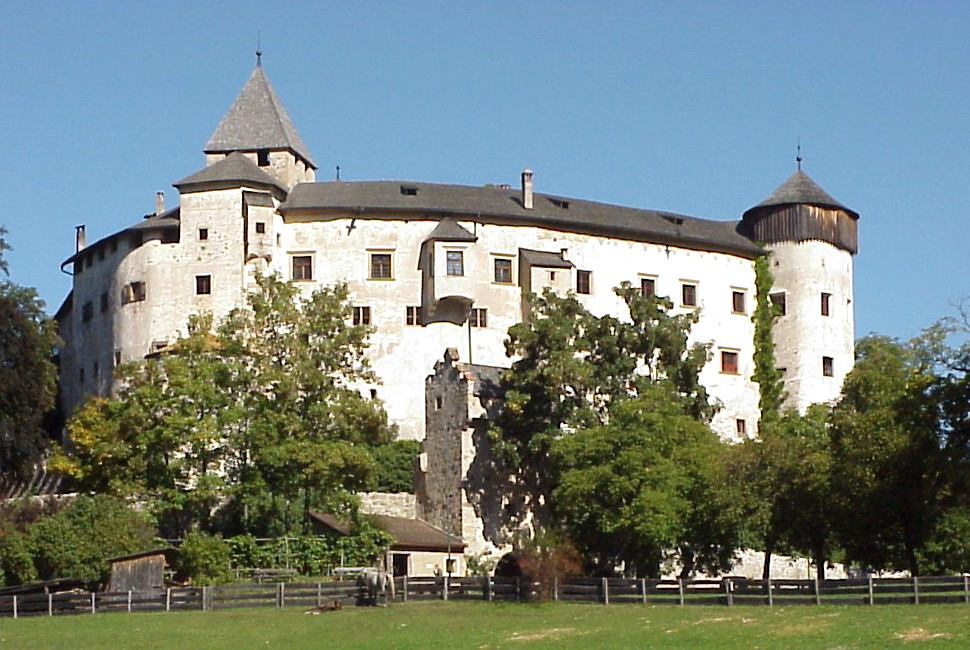
Prösels Castle

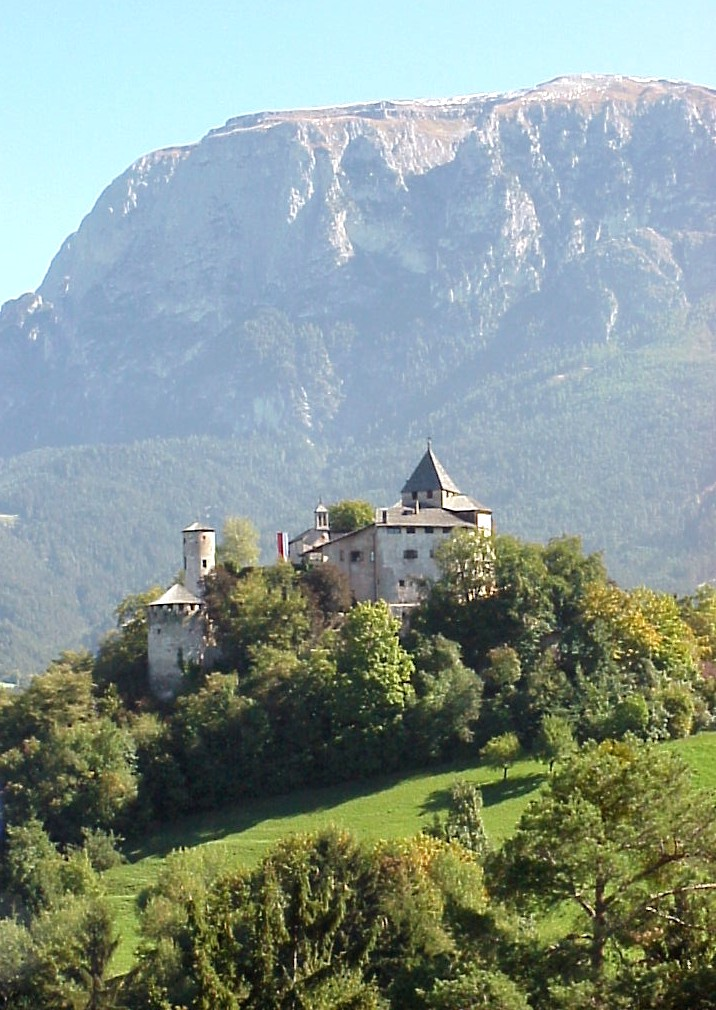
Prösels Castle with the Schlern

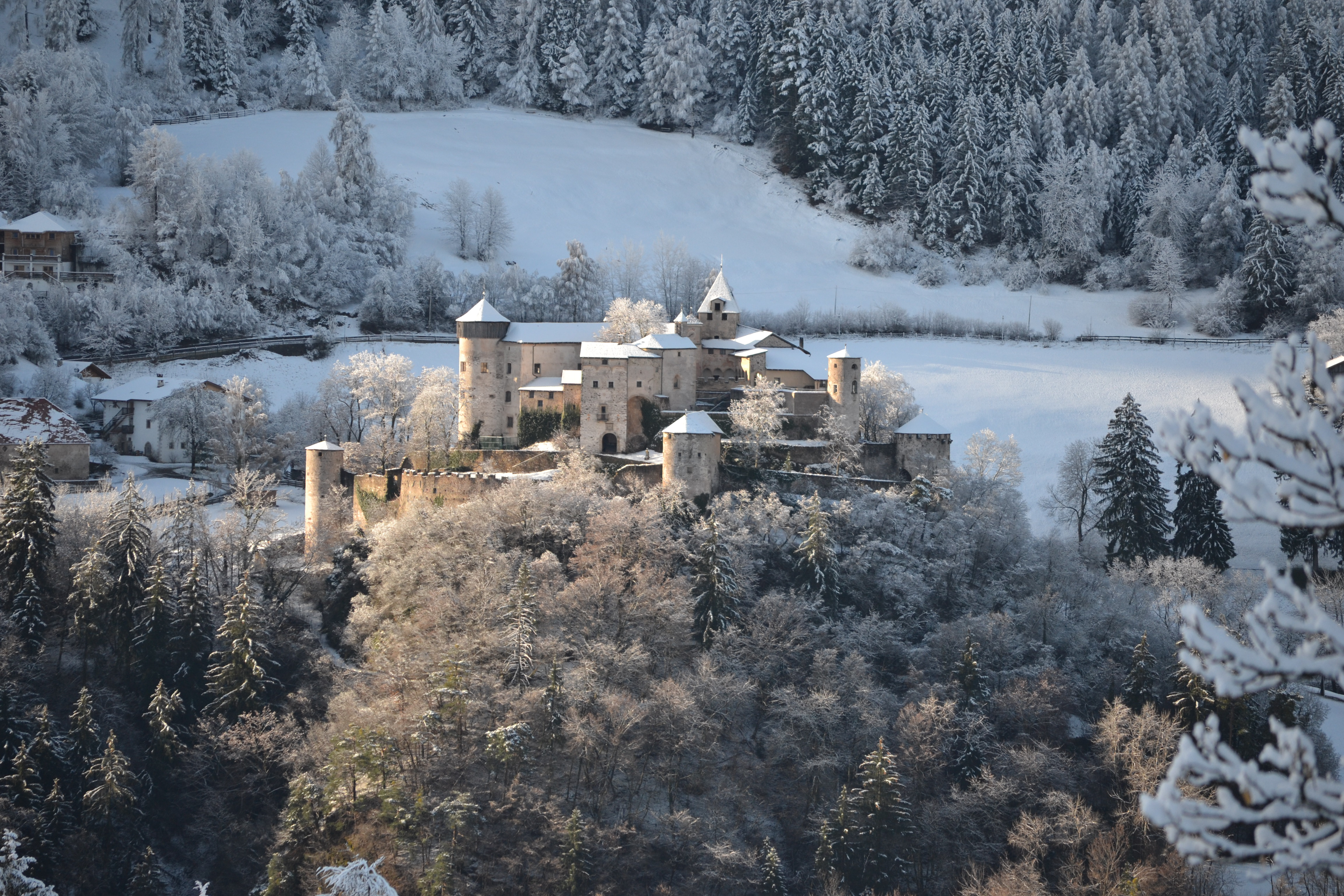
Prösels Castle
