= Messner Mountain Museum =

Group of museums in Italy

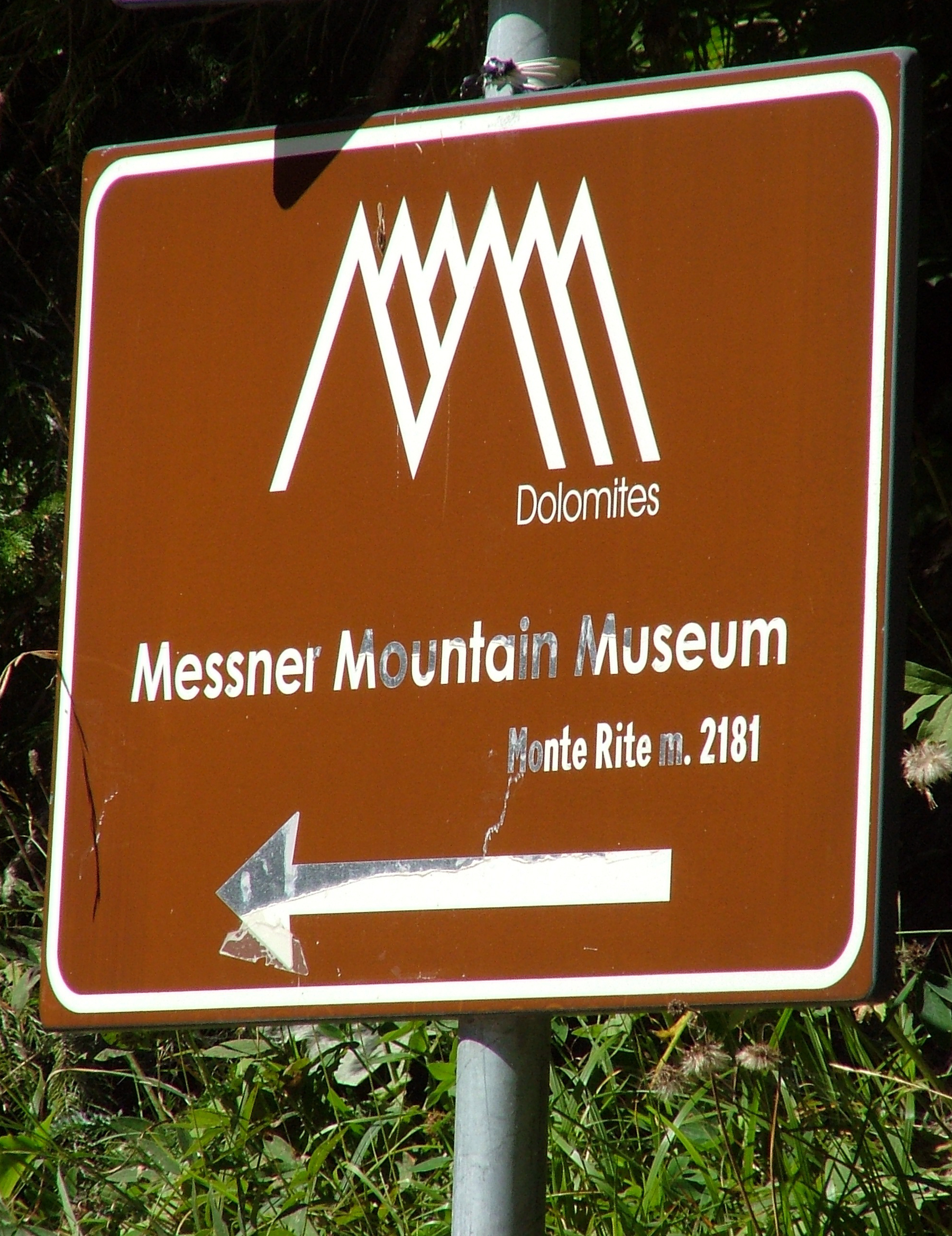
- Messner Mountain Museum signpost
- Established: 11 June 2006
- Location: MMM Firmian at Sigmundskron Castle; MMM Juval at Juval Castle; MMM Dolomites at Monte Rite; MMM Ortles at Sulden; MMM Ripa at Bruneck Castle
- Type: Art museum; Natural history museum; Science museum
- Director: Reinhold Messner
- Owner: Reinhold Messner
- Website: www.messner-mountain-museum.it

The Messner Mountain Museum (MMM) is a museum project created in 2006 by Italian mountaineer and extreme climber Reinhold Messner in South Tyrol in northern Italy. Messner's museum project is designed to educate visitors on "man's encounter with mountains" and deals with the science of mountains and glaciers, the history of mountaineering and rock climbing, the history of mythical mountains, and the history of mountain-dwelling people.

The museum project consists of six museums based at six different locations: Firmian, Juval, Dolomites, Ortles, Ripa and Corones. MMM Firmian at Sigmundskron Castle near Bozen is the centerpiece of the museum and concentrates on man’s relationship with the mountains. The museum includes displays on the geology of the mountains, the religious significance of mountains in the lives of people, and the history of mountaineering and alpine tourism. MMM Juval at Juval Castle in the Burggrafenamt in Vinschgau is dedicated to the "magic of the mountains", with an emphasis on mystical mountains and their religious significance. MMM Dolomites at the Cibiana Pass at Monte Rite, housed in an old fort, is dedicated to the subject of rocks, particularly in the Dolomites, with exhibits focusing on the history of the formation of the Dolomites. This museum contains a summit observation platform that offers a 360° panorama of the surrounding Dolomites. MMM Ortles at Sulden on the Ortler is dedicated to the history of mountaineering on ice and the great glaciers of the world. MMM Ripa at Bruneck Castle in South Tyrol is dedicated to the mountain peoples from Asia, Africa, South America and Europe, with emphasis on their cultures, religions, and tourism activities. MMM Corones on the summit plateau of Kronplatz (2,275 m), is dedicated to traditional mountaineering.

== Projects ==
Position of the six museums

=== Firmian ===
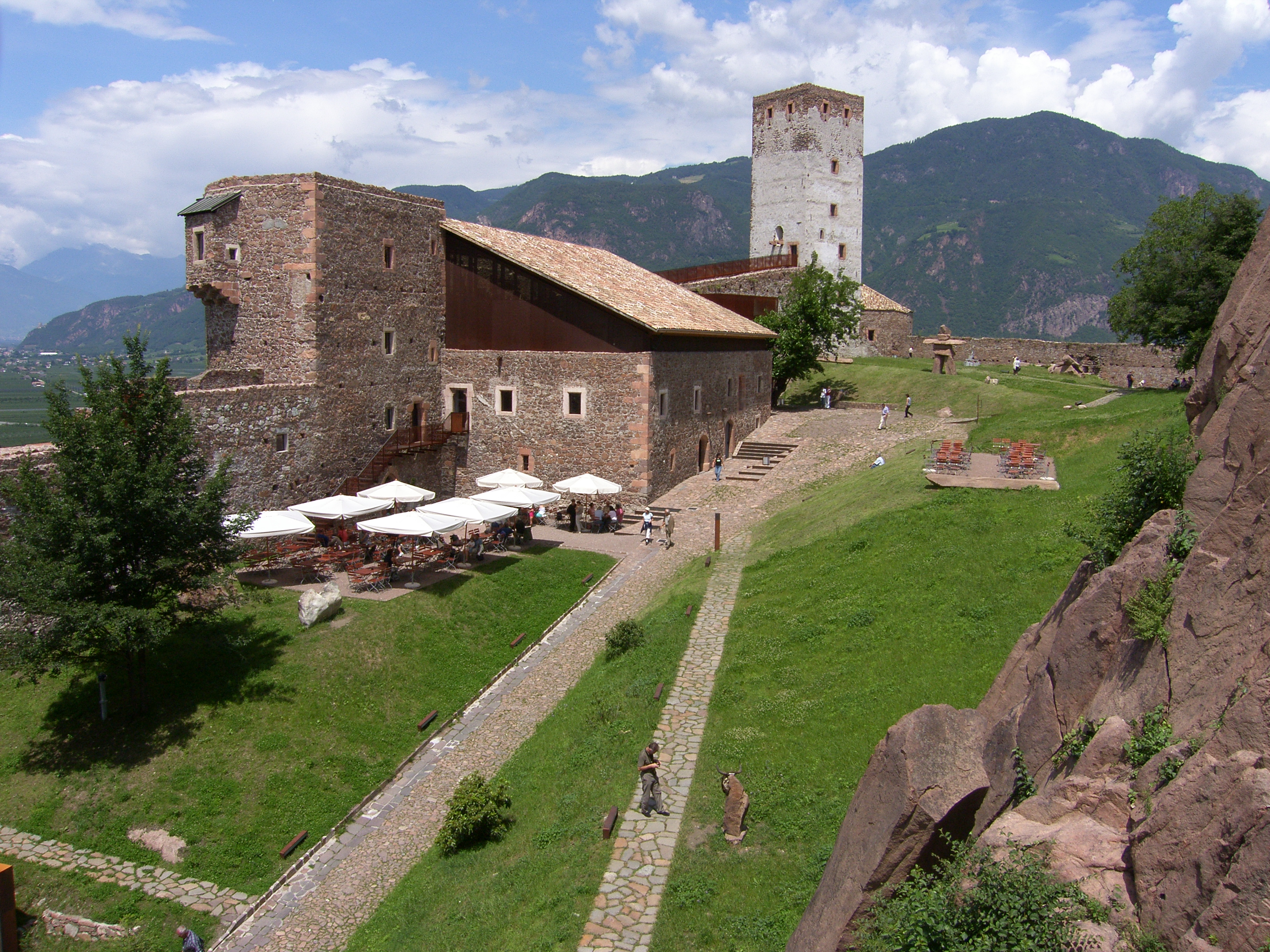
Sigmundskron Castle

The centrepiece of the Messner Mountain Museum is based in Sigmundskron Castle (46.480598°N 11.30484°E) near Bolzano, Italy, and addresses the subject of man's encounter with the mountains. The castle dates to the Late Middle Ages and houses the museum's headquarters, administration and event facilities. There is a rock theatre that seats 200 people. The museum was opened on 11 June 2006 after three years of restoration to the virtually ruined castle.

The concept at MMM Firmian, as this hub of the museum is known, is based on three strands: the castle, the restoration and the exhibitions. The appearance of the castle has not been destroyed by modern alterations. The architect, Werner Tscholl, paid attention to the fact that the historical building had to retain its originality; for example, the new glass roof structures and pipes or cables of any kind are not visible from the outside.

The MMM Firmian itself covers an area of 1,100 square metres (12,000 sq ft). The theme of the museum is the history and art of mountaineering. Messner wants to show "what effect the mountain has on people". as well as giving an understanding of mountains and mountain peoples. He demonstrates this by means of pictures, sculptures, symbolic objects and memorabilia of various expeditions, which are portrayed as part of a tour through the castle. Messner also shows the history of alpinism and the impact of alpinism and tourism on nature and the environment. A separate exhibition on the history of the castle and the region is in a tower.

=== Juval ===
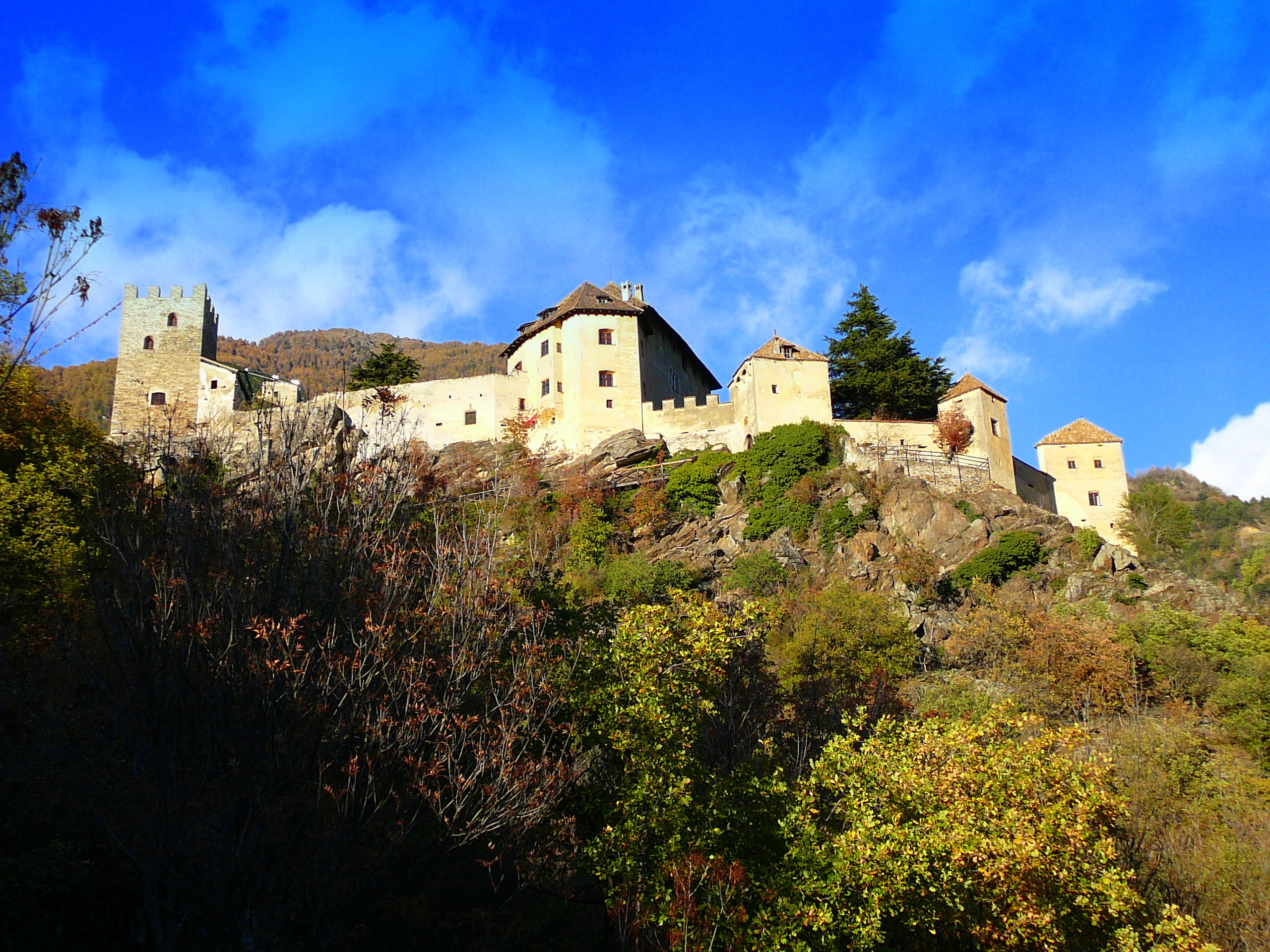
Juval Castle

This part of the MMM is housed within Juval Castle (46.651531°N 10.968019°E) near Naturns, a late-medieval castle, and was opened in 1995. This castle is privately owned by Messner and he uses it as his summer residence.

This MMM deals with the mountains as places of mystery and spirituality. Its main focus is the sacred mountains of the world such as Kailash, Mount Fuji or Ayers Rock. In addition, Tibetan exhibits such as precious Buddha sculptures and a giant prayer wheel are displayed. There is also an exhibition on Gesar Ling, an epic Tibetan king, a tantric room and an expedition room in the basement. Finally there is a collection of masks, displays on aspects of animism and mountain images in the keep.

=== Dolomites ===
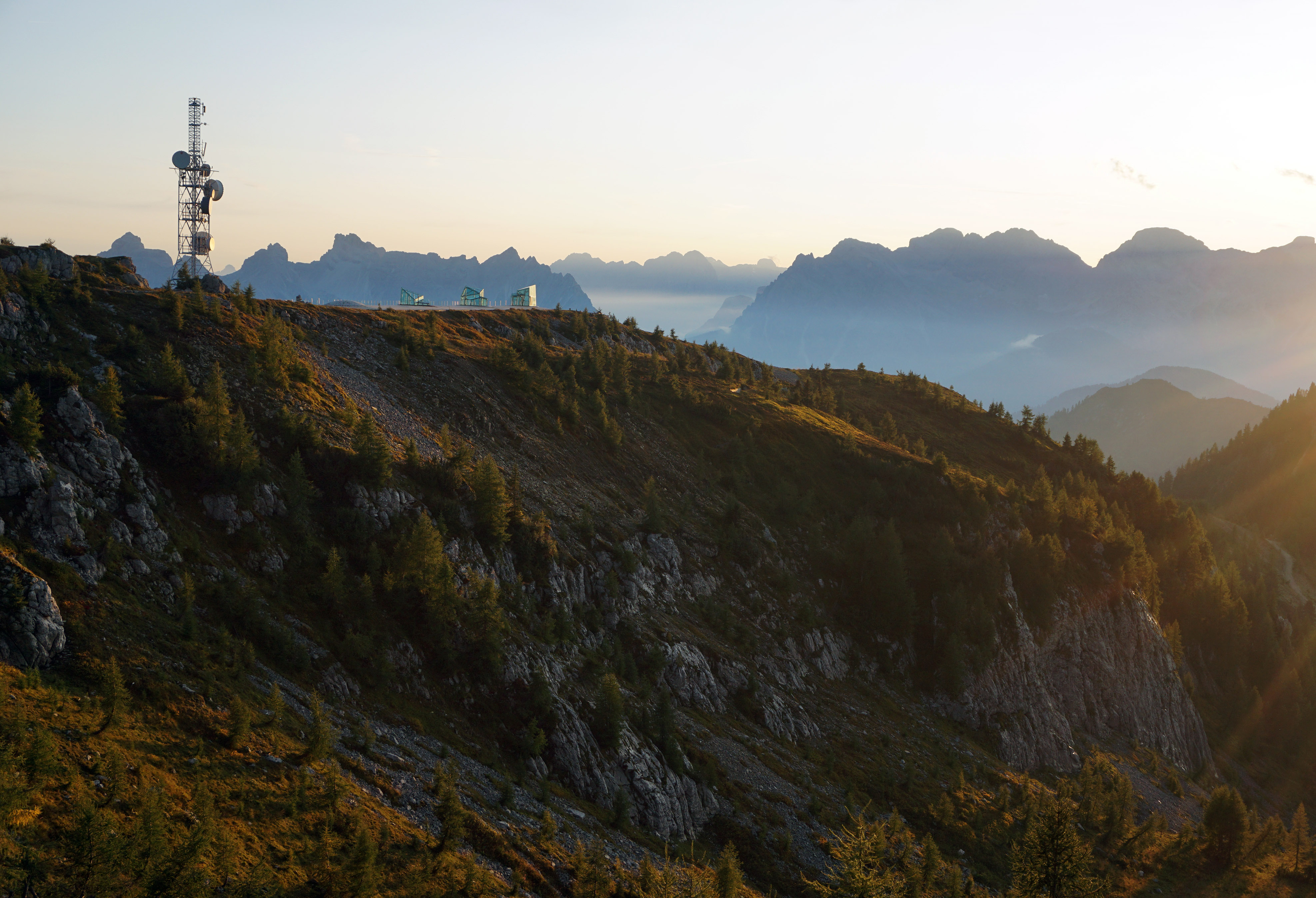
Messner Mountain Museum in Monte Rite, Dolomites

MMM Dolomites is housed in a First World War fort at a height of 2,181 metres on Monte Rite (46.38393°N 12.254713°E) between Cortina d’Ampezzo and Pieve di Cadore. This "museum in the clouds" was opened in 2002 and has the "vertical world" of the Dolomites as its theme. It covers the history of the opening up of the Dolomites as well as aspects of Alpine history and its protagonists.

=== Ortles ===
The fourth part of the MMM is laid out underground below the Ortler in Sulden. Since opening in 2004, subjects such as the eternal ice and the Ortler are covered in an exhibition space of 300 square metres, with exhibitions on skiing, ice climbing, the Arctic and the Antarctic. Visitors are able to go inside the mountain and its glacier.

Also in Sulden is the museum Alpine Curiosa (46.529402°N 10.58548°E) in a twelve square metre little old cottage called Flohhäusl, with portrayals of 13 legendary mountaineering stories (from Yogi Milarepa to Messner himself), which offers a different interpretation of mountaineering and where alpine curiosities are displayed.

=== Ripa ===
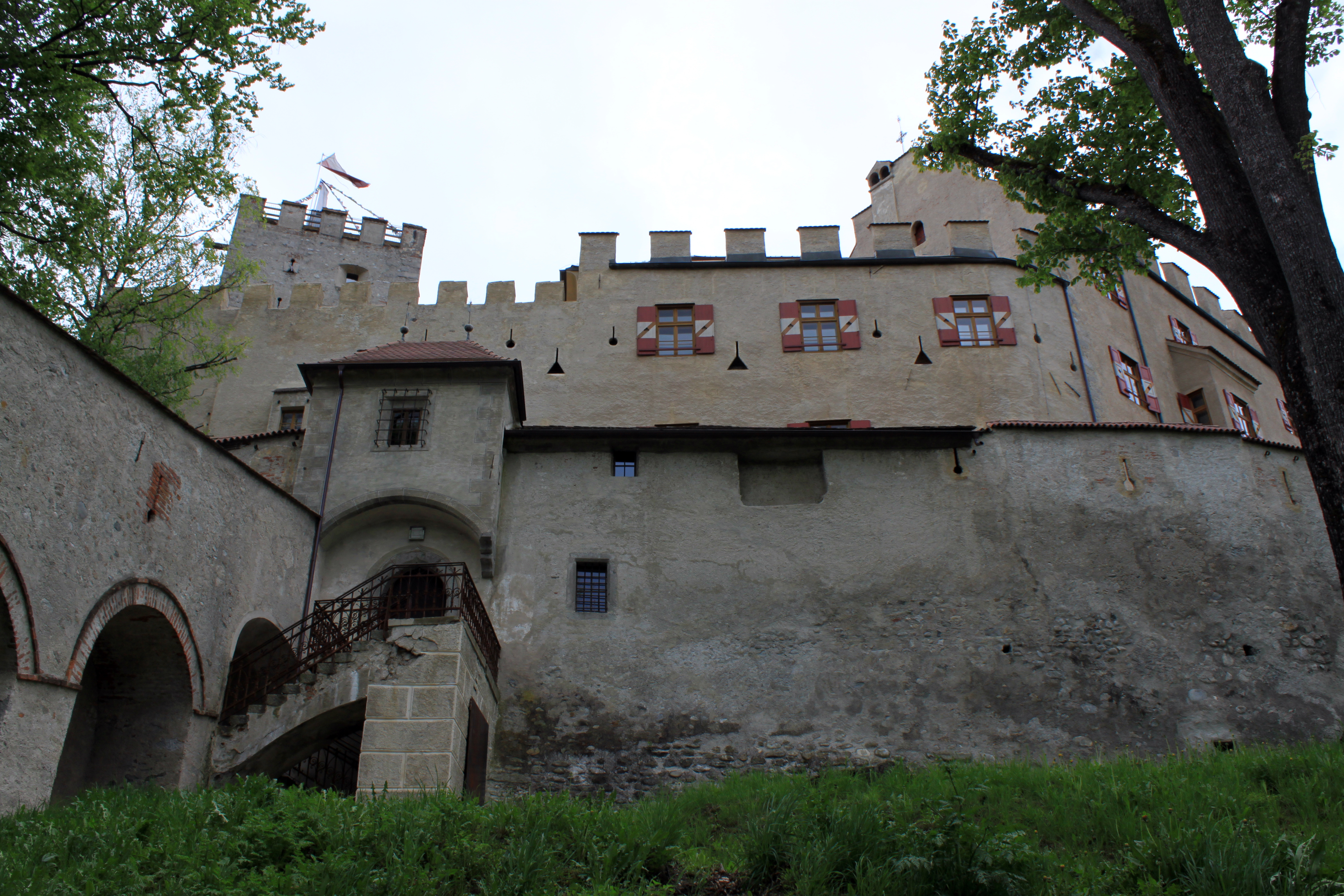
Bruneck Castle

The fifth part of the MMM is MMM Ripa at Bruneck Castle (46.794299°N 11.939497°E) above the town of Bruneck. This is planned to open in Spring 2011 and is intended as an interactive museum, which will offer a forum for various mountain peoples to exchange experiences with the local farming community. Guests from other mountain regions will spend a summer here and talk about their lives. Examples that Messner has given include the Sherpas, South American Indians, Tibetans, Mongols or Hunzas.

=== Corones ===
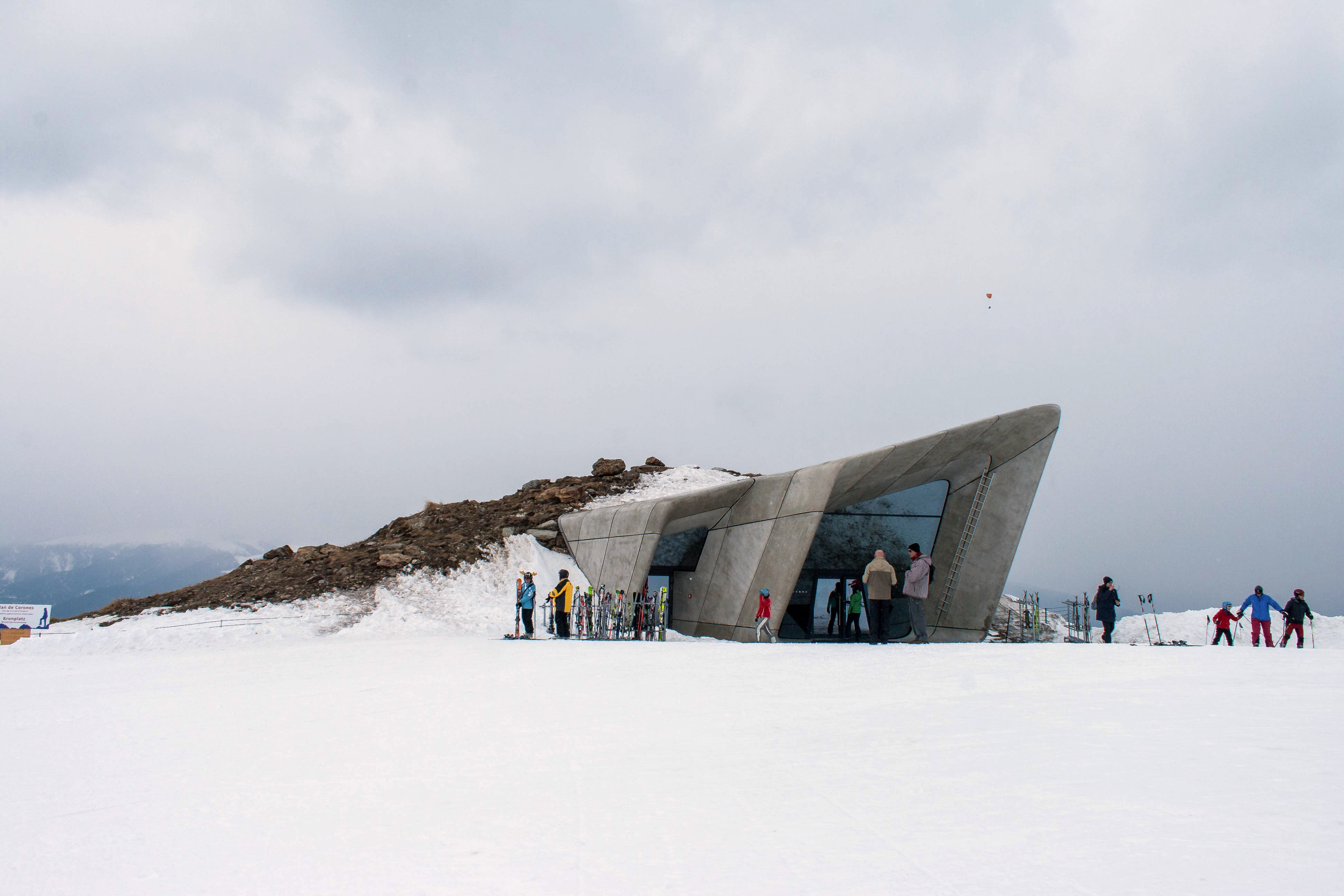
Messner Mountain Museum on the Kronplatz

The sixth and last museum of the MMM network, the MMM Corones, was built on the top of the Kronplatz mountain (Plan de Corones in Ladin and Italian) at an altitude of 2,275 meters above sea level. Opened in July 2015, the museum, a modern structure designed by renowned British architect Zaha Hadid, has a floor area of 1,000 square meters and features a permanent exhibition dedicated to traditional climbing and mountaineering.

== Cost and financing ==
The cost of the project is estimated at up to €30 million, split between Messner and the province of South Tyrol. The latter funded the restoration and expansion of the old buildings; in return, Messner has to maintain the exhibitions without subsidy for 30 years. The restoration of the old fort on the Monte Rite was undertaken by the region of Venetia together with the municipality of Pieve di Cadore. For renovating and developing the MMM Bergvölker costs of between three and four million euros have been suggested, 80% of which will be borne by the province of South Tyrol in order to provide financial support to the municipality of Bruneck.
