= Festenstein Castle =

- Burg Festenstein, Ruine Festenstein, Schloss Festenstein, Castelforte, Castel Forte
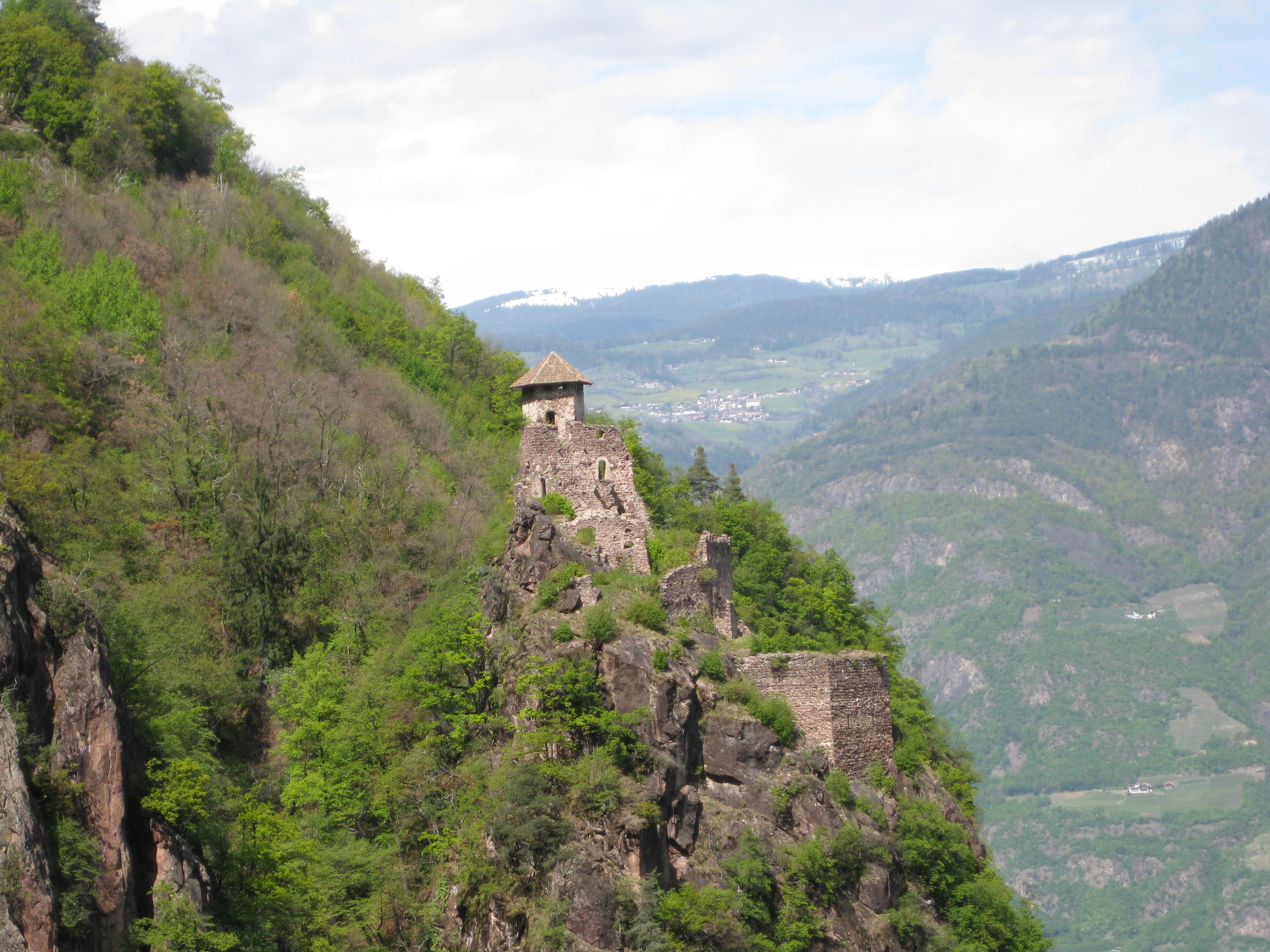
- Festenstein Castle
- Interactive map of Festenstein Castle
- 46.5119°N 11.2187°E
- Type: Castle ruin
- Location: Andrian, South Tyrol, Italy
- Nearest city: Bolzano

History
- Built: 13th century
- Built for: Warlords of the region
- Original use: Stronghold, tax collection

Site notes
- Restored: 2008
- Restored by: South Tyrolean Office for Cultural Heritage
- Current use: Preservation site
- Owner: Count Meinhard Khuen von Belasi

Festenstein Castle (also Burg Festenstein, Ruine Festenstein, Schloss Festenstein, Castelforte, and Castel Forte) is a 13th-century castle ruin, located above Andrian in South Tyrol, in northern Italy. It is perched on a rocky outcrop called the Gaider Schlucht, and can only be reached via a steep mountain climb. The castle was built around the mid-13th century, and was used as a stronghold by the many warlords of the area. It was saved from further deterioration in 2008.

== History ==
The exact date Festenstein castle was built is not known. It is mentioned in written documents in the mid-13th century, and had already been built by the time the Counts of Eppan took possession. They used it as a stronghold and to collect taxes from nearby farms. The castle was damaged at some point, and repairs began in 1383, when it became the property of the Lords of Villanders. The castle changed hands many times, belonging to the Sparrenberger family in the 15th century, and the Lords Lanser di Appiano between 1654 and 1818. In 2008, Count Meinhard Khuen von Belasi purchased the ruins, and with the South Tyrolean Office for Cultural Heritage, restoration was begun to protect the castle from further deterioration.
