= Treuenstein Castle =

Coordinates: 46°30′41″N 11°20′48″E

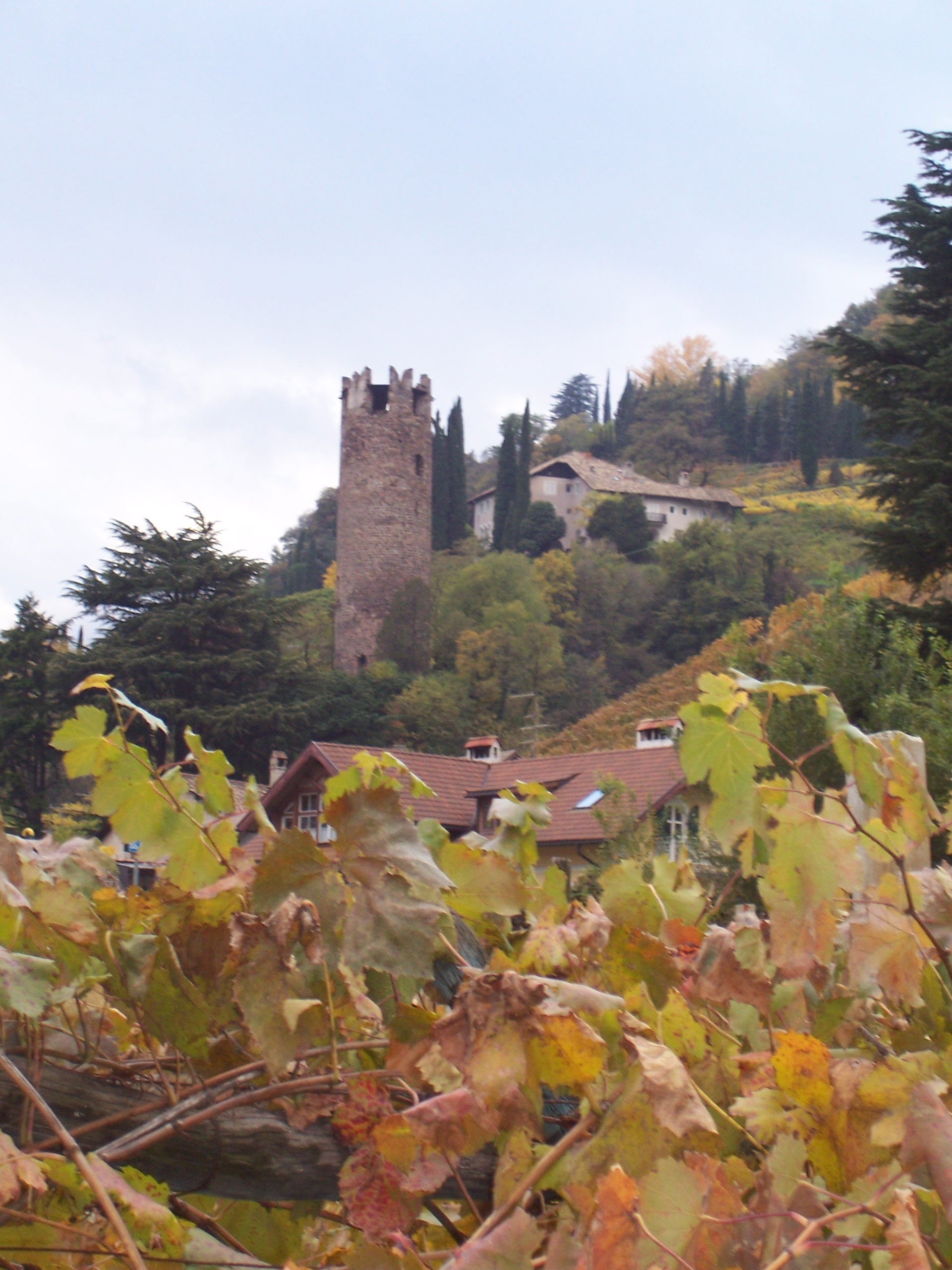
Treuenstein Castle

Treuenstein Castle (German: Burgruine Treuenstein locally also known as G'scheibter Turm; Italian: Torre Druso) is a medieval fortification on the outskirts of Bolzano in South Tyrol, northern Italy. Located in the borough of Gries, it was built between 1276 and 1278 by Meinhard, Count of Tyrol for his trusted vassal Friedrich, a burgher from Bolzano.

Little is known about Friedrich, son of Landfried, before he entered Meinhards services. His loyalty impressed Meinhard so much that he chose to buy an estate located near the Fagen creek near the entrance of the Sarntal valley from the Walbensteiner family in 1276.

The newly built castle was given the name Treuenstein (Trewenstain), meaning loyal stone in German, by Meinhard to emphasize his complete trust in his vassal. Friedrich acquired its name and thus in a document from 1283 was referred to as dominus Fridericus de Trewenstain but also as sive de fidelis petra (meaning "or from the loyal stone" in Latin).

Friedrich von Treuenstein's impressive career continued unabated: in 1286 or 1287 Count Meinhard nominated him capitaneus et rector Tridenti (captain and administrator of Trent) before he died around 1294.

Even though Friedrich had five sons, the Treuenstein family became extinct in 1348. Treuenstein castle changed owners many times over while quickly falling into disrepair. Already in the 15th century the castle, save for the main tower, had disappeared. In 1497, in a document issued by Maximilian I, the keep of Treuenstein is referred to as zum Scheyblingen thurn.

In 1656 the nobleman Cyriac Troyer von Giessbach acquired the ruins of the castle and the nearby manor, renaming it Troyenstein. The Troyer family sold it to a Herr von Zallinger from Bolzano in 1810, followed by various owners, before it was sold to Karl Pieschl in 1862, who proceeded to remodel the manor in Tudor Revival style.

Today the remaining keep of Treuenstein castle is commonly known as G'scheibter Turm (meaning sliced tower in German). A nearby street is named after it.

== Sources ==
- Paul Mayr (1989). Treuenstein und der Gscheibte Turm, in Oswald Trapp and Magdalena Hörmann-Weingartner, Tiroler Burgenbuch, vol. 8, Bolzano/Innsbruck/Vienna: Athesia-Tyrolia. ISBN 88-7014-495-X, pp. 177-205.
- Bruno Mahlknecht (2006). Bolzano durch die Jahrhunderte, vol. 3, chapter Treuenstein und „G’scheibter Turm“, Athesia Spectrum, Bolzano, ISBN 978-88-6011-027-5, pp. 56-64.
- Hannes Obermair (2008). Bozen Süd – Bolzano Nord. Schriftlichkeit und urkundliche Überlieferung der Stadt Bozen bis 1500. Vol. 2. Bozen-Bolzano: Stadtgemeinde Bozen. ISBN 978-88-901870-1-8.
