= Sigmundskron Castle =

Castle in Bolzano, Italy

Coordinates: 46°28′49″N 11°18′19″E

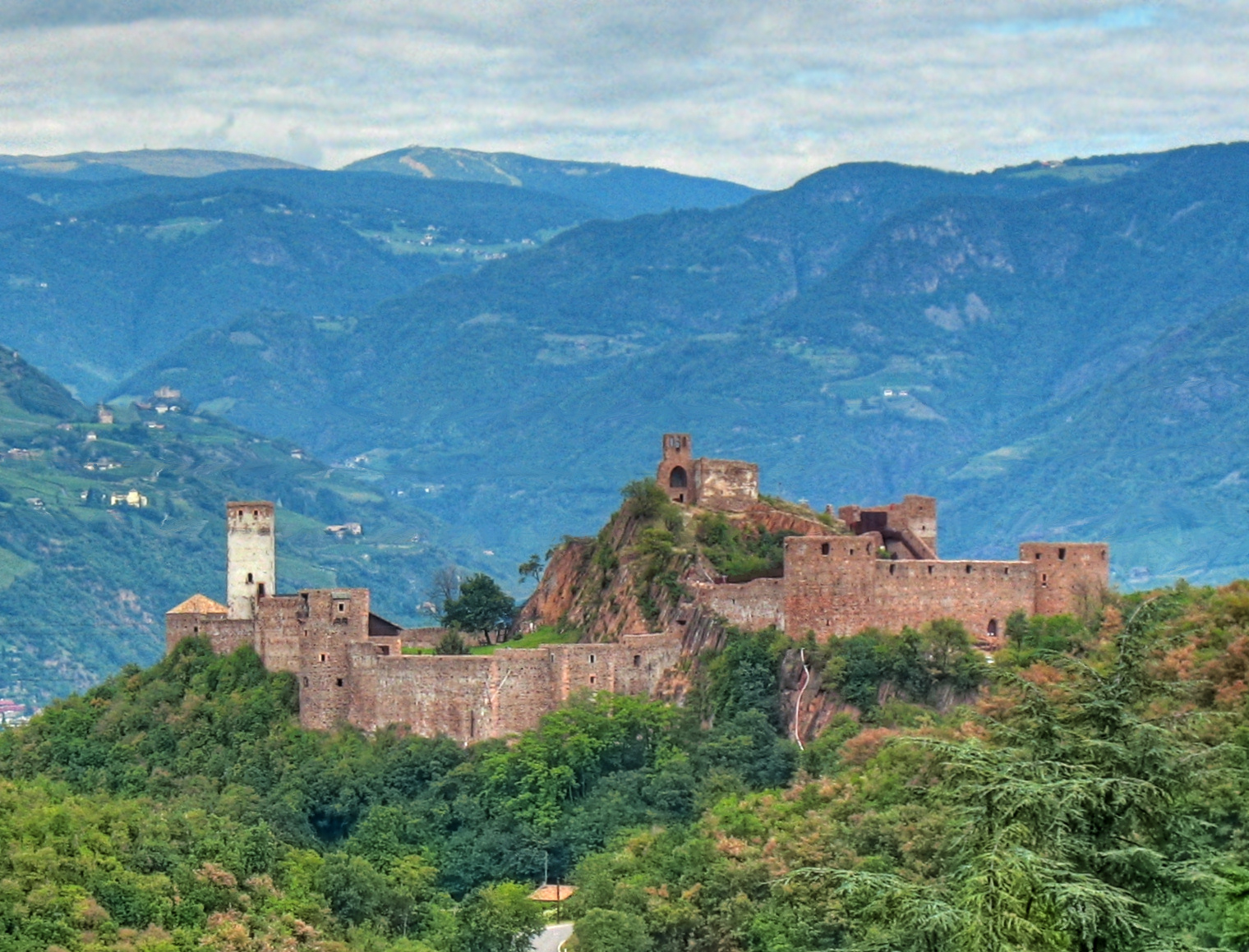
Sigmundskron Castle.

Sigmundskron Castle (German: Schloss Sigmundskron, Italian: Castel Firmiano) is an extensive castle and set of fortifications near Bolzano in South Tyrol. Today its ruins house the fourth mountain museum established by the South Tyrolean mountaineer, Reinhold Messner. On 9 June 2006 the MMM (Messner Mountain Museum Firmian) was opened in this fortified castle dating to the Late Middle Ages.

== History ==
The first historical mention of the castle, under the name Formicaria (later Formigar), dates back to AD 945, when Manasses of Arles handed it over to Berengar of Ivrea. In 1027 Emperor Conrad II transferred it to the Bishop of Trent. In the 12th century it was given to ministeriales, who from then on were named the Firmian family. Around 1473 the Prince of Tyrol, Duke Sigismund the Rich, bought the castle, renamed it Sigmundskron Castle and had it developed to withstand firearms. Of the old castle of Formigar there are only a few remnants left today, mostly located on the highest point of the site. Due to financial difficulties Sigmund had to pledge the castle soon afterwards. As a result the site fell increasingly into disrepair.

At the end of the 18th century, the castle belonged to the Count Wolkenstein, from 1807 to 1870 the counts of Sarnthein and from then until 1994 the counts of Toggenburg. In 1976, the half-ruined castle was partially restored by an innkeeper's family and opened as a restaurant. In 1996 the castle passed into the possession of the Province of Bolzano. In the spring of 2003, after much controversy, Reinhold Messner was given a licence for his long-planned mountain museum.

During construction work a Neolithic grave was discovered in March 2006, in which a woman's skeletal remains were found. The age of the grave is estimated to be 6,000-7,000 years.

== A symbol of the independence movement ==
The fortress is an important political symbol in South Tyrol. In 1957, under the leadership of Silvius Magnago, the largest protest rally in the history of South Tyrol was held here. More than 30,000 gathered in the castle to protest against the failure of the Paris Convention to protest and demand freedom for South Tyrol ("Freedom from Trent").
