= Morter =

Coordinates: 46°36′N 10°49′E

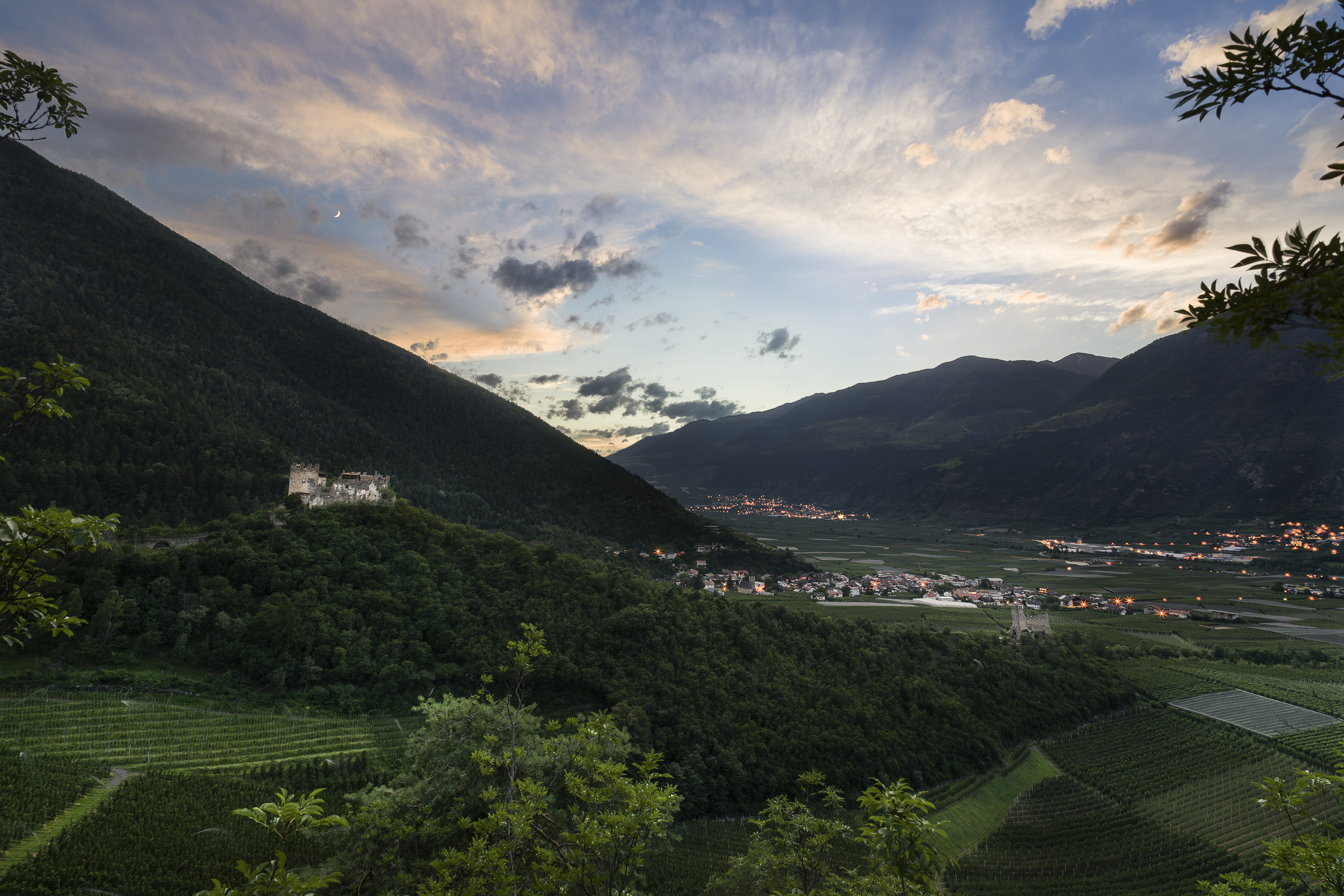
Morter

Morter is a subdivision of the municipality of Latsch in South Tyrol, Italy.
