= Juval Castle =

Coordinates: 46.6515°N 10.9681°E

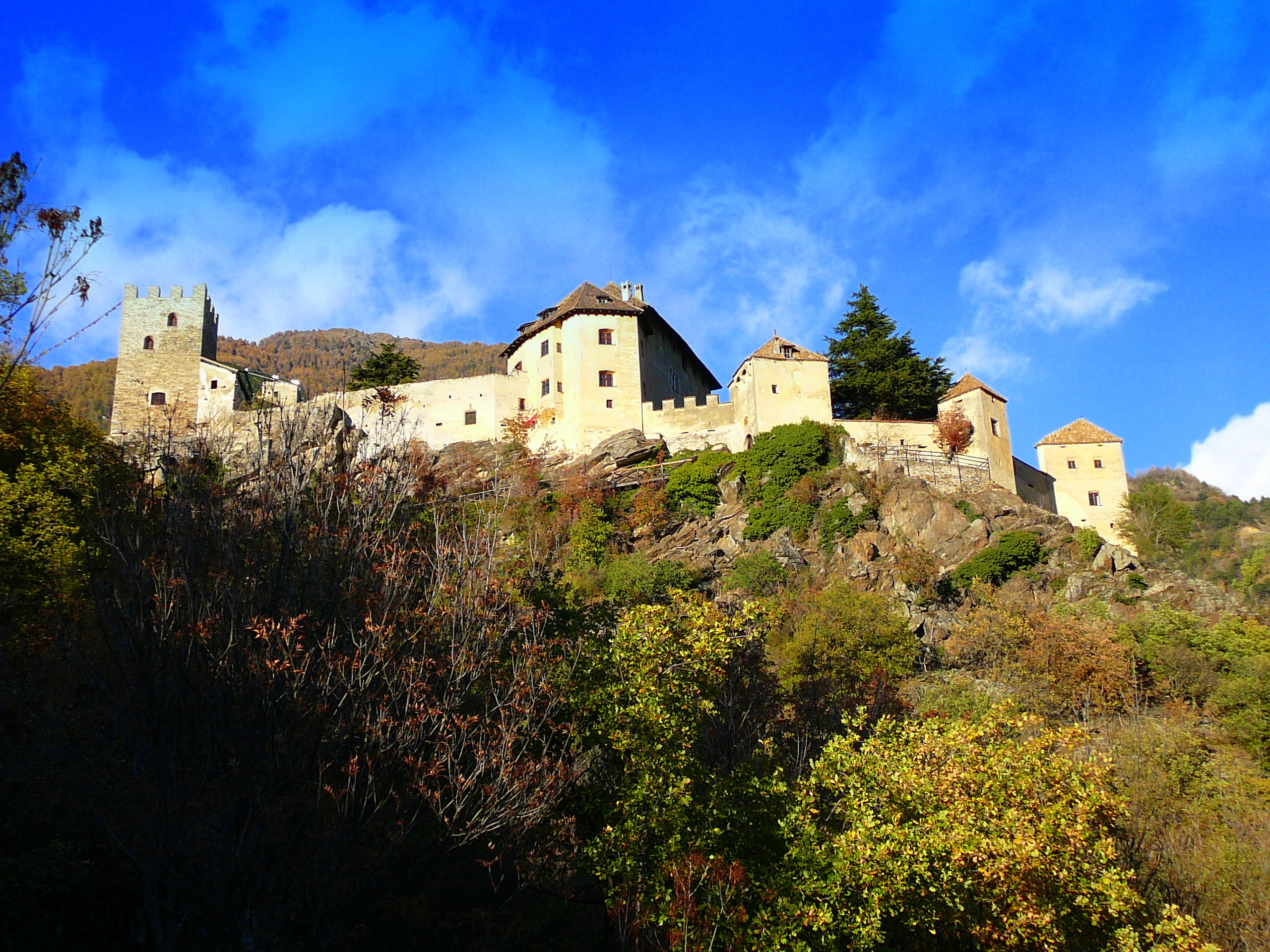
Juval Castle

Juval Castle (German: Schloss Juval; Italian: Castel Juval [kaˈstɛl juˈval]) is a medieval castle located at the entrance of the Schnalstal, in the Vinschgau, above the village of Naturns in the comune of Kastelbell-Tschars at around 1000 meters above sea level, in South Tyrol, northern Italy. It derives its name from the Latin name of the mountain, Mons Jovis (mountain of Jupiter).

The oldest account of the castle dates to 1278, when it was owned by Hugo of Montalban. It was probably constructed about thirty years before the first account referencing it. In 1368, it was acquired by the lords of Starkenberg, and in 1540, it passed to Sinkmoser. The period from its construction to the mid-1500s was the castle's heyday.

After several more changes of ownership, in 1813, it was sold to a local farmer, Josef Blaas. The castle was passed down through generations and was owned by the Blaas family until World War II, when it was taken over by the Nazis.

From 1983 to 2025, it has been the summer residence (July and August) of mountaineer Reinhold Messner, who has partially converted it into a museum displaying works of Tibetan art and a collection of masks from five continents. A later restoration of the castle was presided over by Vinschgau architect Karl Spitaler. It is one of the venues of the Messner Mountain Museum. The museum is closed in the summer months, when Messner resides in the castle.

Around the castle there is a path open to the public along which there are informational signs relating to the botanical features on the grounds. For private individuals, the castle is accessible only on foot with an hour-long walk or by using a special bus service.
