= Zingerle =

Zingerle is a surname. Notable people with the surname include:

- Andreas Zingerle (born 1961), Italian biathlete
- Franz Zingerle (1908–1988), Austrian alpine skier
- Hermann Zingerle (1870–1935), Austrian neurologist and psychiatrist
- Ignaz Vincenz Zingerle (1825–1892), Austrian poet and scholar
- Pius Zingerle (1801–1881), Austrian Orientalist
