= Ignaz Vincenz Zingerle =

Austrian poet and scholar (1825–1892)

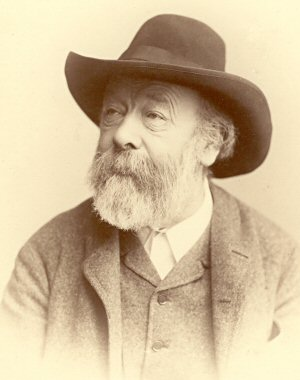
Ignaz Vincenz Zingerle.

Ignaz Vincenz Zingerle (6 June 1825 – 17 September 1892) was an Austrian poet and scholar.

Zingerle was born, the son of the Roman Catholic theologian and orientalist Pius Zingerle (1801-1881), at Meran. He began his studies at Trento, and entered for a while the Benedictine monastery at Marienberg. Abandoning the clerical profession, he returned to Innsbruck, where, in 1848, he became teacher in the gymnasium, and in 1859 professor of German language and literature at the university. He died at Innsbruck in September 1892.

Zingerle is known as author through his Zeitgedichte (Innsbruck, 1848); Von den Alpen (1850); Die Müllerin, a village tale (1853); Der Bauer von Longfall (1874); and Erzählungen aus dem Burggrafenamte (1884). His ethnographical writings and literary studies, dealing especially with Tirol, have, however, rendered him more famous. Among them may be mentioned his editions of König Laurin (1859), of the legend, Von den heyligen drei Königen (1855); Sagen aus Tirol (1850, 2nd ed. 1891); Tirol: Natur, Geschichte und Sage im Spiegel deutscher Dichtung (1851); Die Personen- und Taufnamen Tirols (1855); Sitten, Bräuche und Meinungen des Tiroler Volkes (2nd ed. 1871); Das deutsche Kinderspiel im Mittelalter (2nd ed. 1873); Schildereien aus Tirol (1877, new series, 1888). With E. Inama-Sternegg, he edited Tirolische Weisthümer (5 vols., 1875-1891).
