= Steinerner Steg =

Bridge in Merano, Italy

Coordinates: 46°40′18″N 11°10′09″E

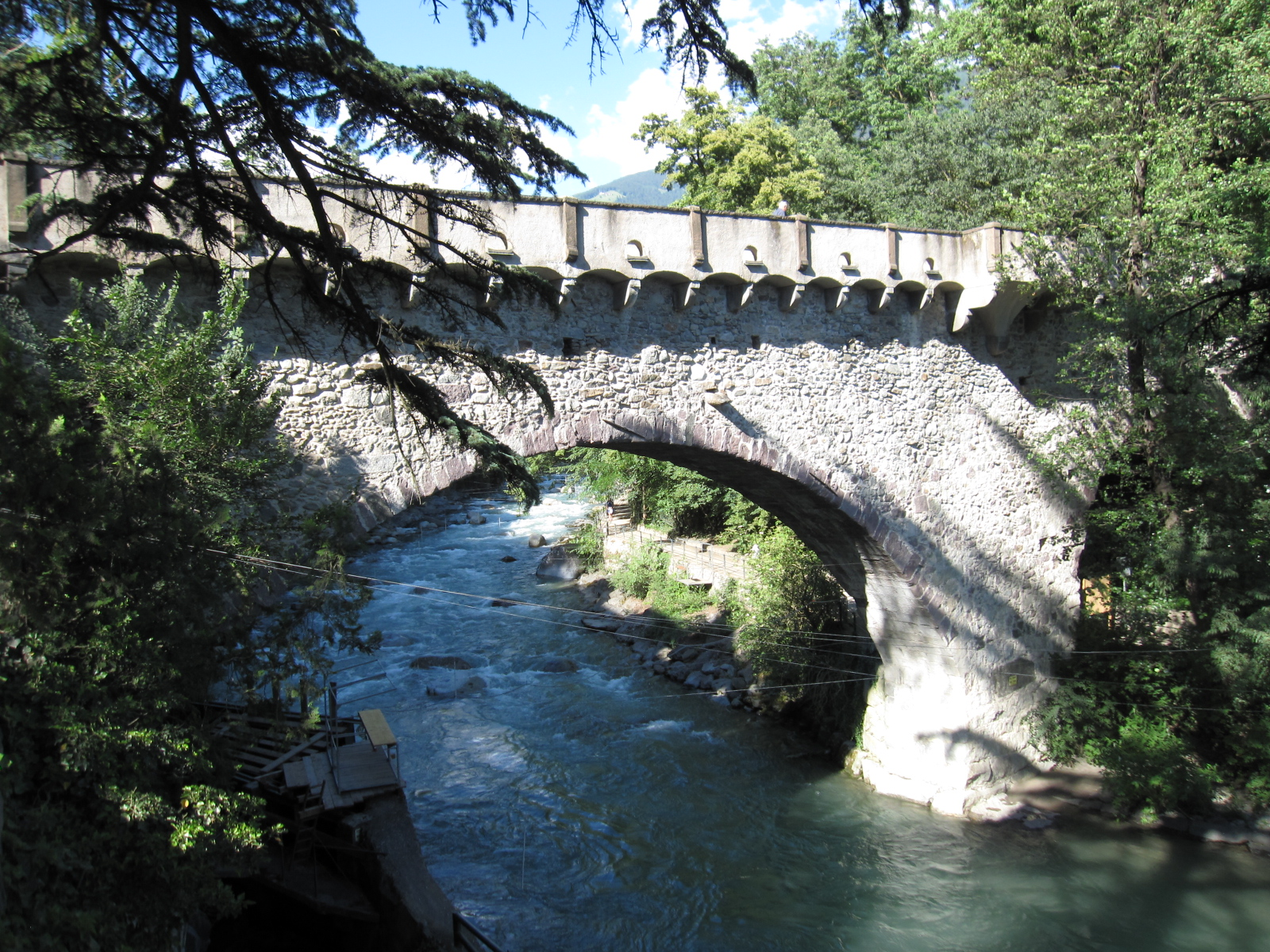
Steinerner Steg bridge in Merano

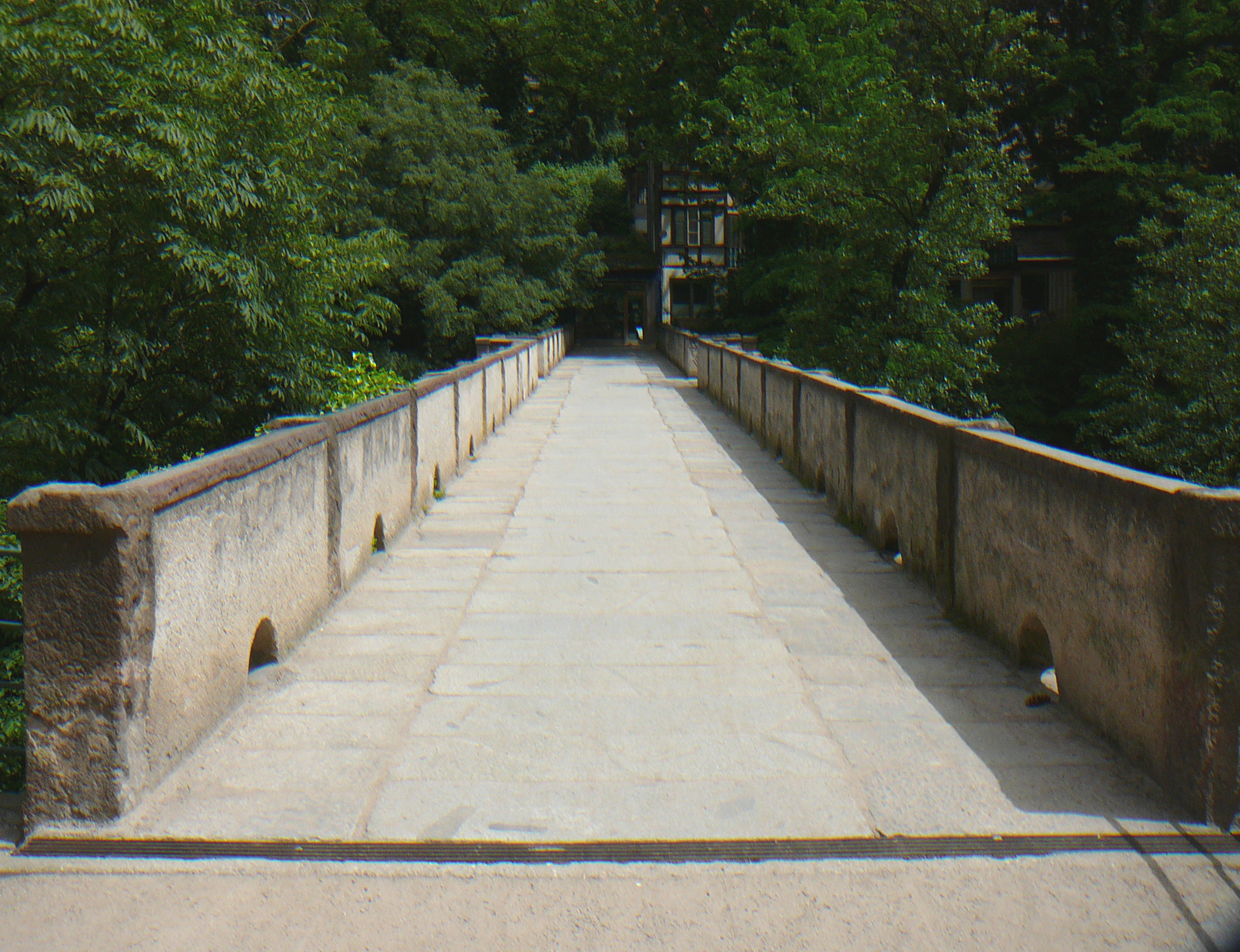
On top of the bridge

The Steinerner Steg (Italian: Ponte Romano) is a two-arched, stone-built footbridge across the Passer in Merano, South Tyrol, northern Italy. The oldest bridge in the town, it connects the historic centre and the Steinach district with the Obermais quarter.

In 1615 the wooden aqueduct which spanned the river here had fallen into disrepair and the town decided to demolish it and build a stone bridge in its place. The following year Andrä Tanner, an architect from Brixen, was contracted to build the replacement. Scarcely had the works been completed, however, when the new bridge was washed away in a flood. The current structure was completed in 1617. The bridge is near the Passeirer Tor, one of the town gates of Merano.

== Naming ==
“Steinerner Steg” is simply German name for “stone footbridge”, while “Ponte Romano” is the Italian equivalent of “Roman bridge”. Although the latter name has been taken to imply that the bridge might have ancient Roman origins, but in fact “Ponte Romano” was only introduced on December 2, 1927 by the fascist authorities as part of their Italianization of South Tyrol campaign.
