= Empress Elisabeth Park =

Coordinates: 46.66904°N 11.16464°E

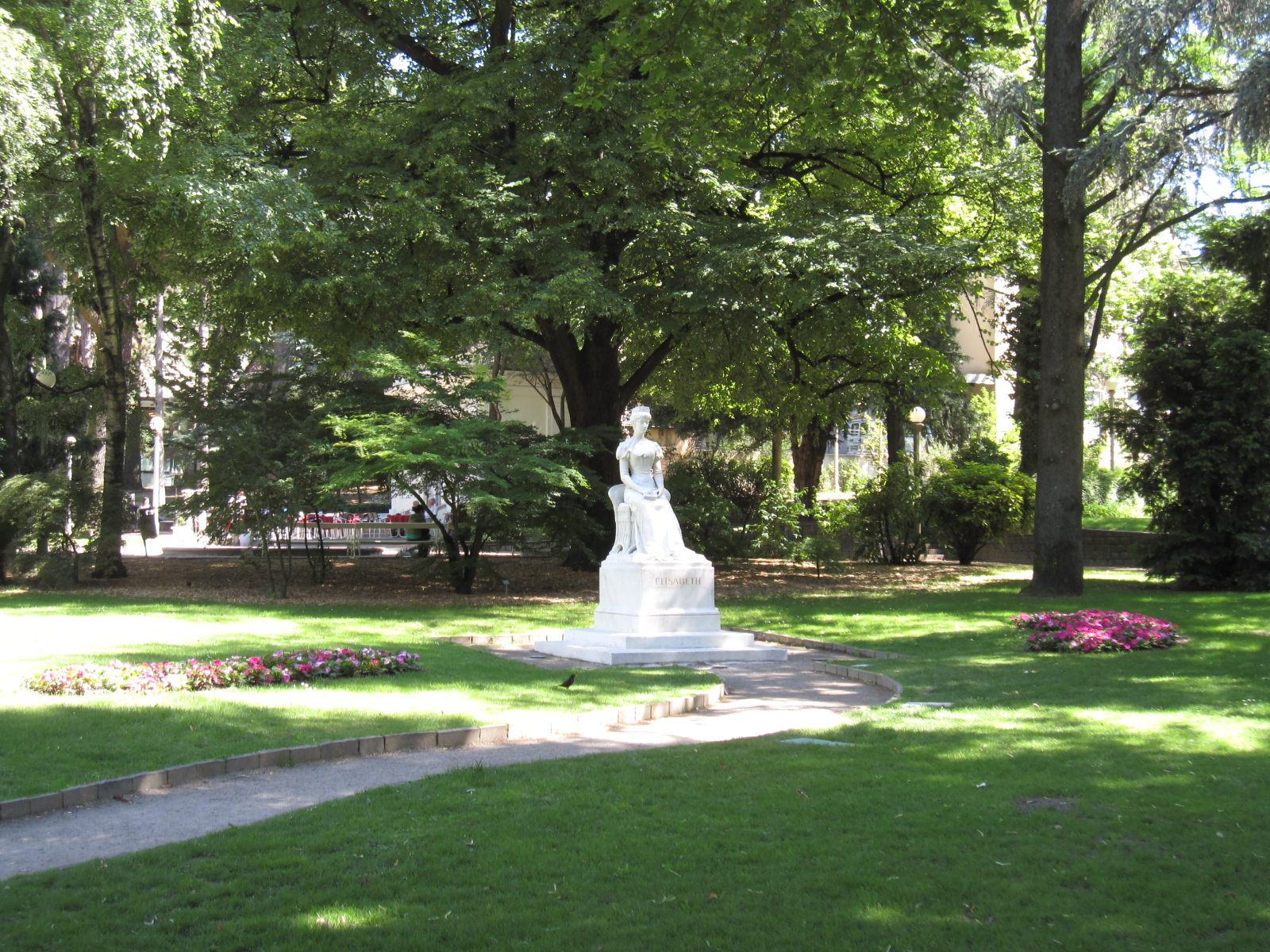
Monument to Empress Elisabeth of Austria in the park named after her honour

The Empress Elisabeth Park (German: Kaiserin-Elisabeth-Park) is a public park in the town of Meran, South Tyrol in northern Italy.

The park was created in 1860 and named in honour of Empress Elisabeth of Austria, Queen of Hungary, who was assassinated by an anarchist in Geneva on 10 September 1898. The empress's first visit to Meran was in 1870, and she quickly grew fond of the place due to its microclimate and waters. Her frequent returns eventually turned the town into a popular spa of the aristocracy, which contributed to the growth of the town. The seated, life-size statue of her was hewn out of Laas marble by the sculptor Hermann Klotz in 1903 in the Jugendstil, and renovated by Professor Franz Santifaller in 1927.

The park is around 7,100 m2 big and is located on the left bank of the Passer river that flows through the city. It is accessible from the other side by the Postbrücke (Postal Bridge). The park also has a café named after the empress and is a favourite place for visitors.

== See also ==
- Queen Elisabeth Park, Gödöllő
