= Gates of Merano =

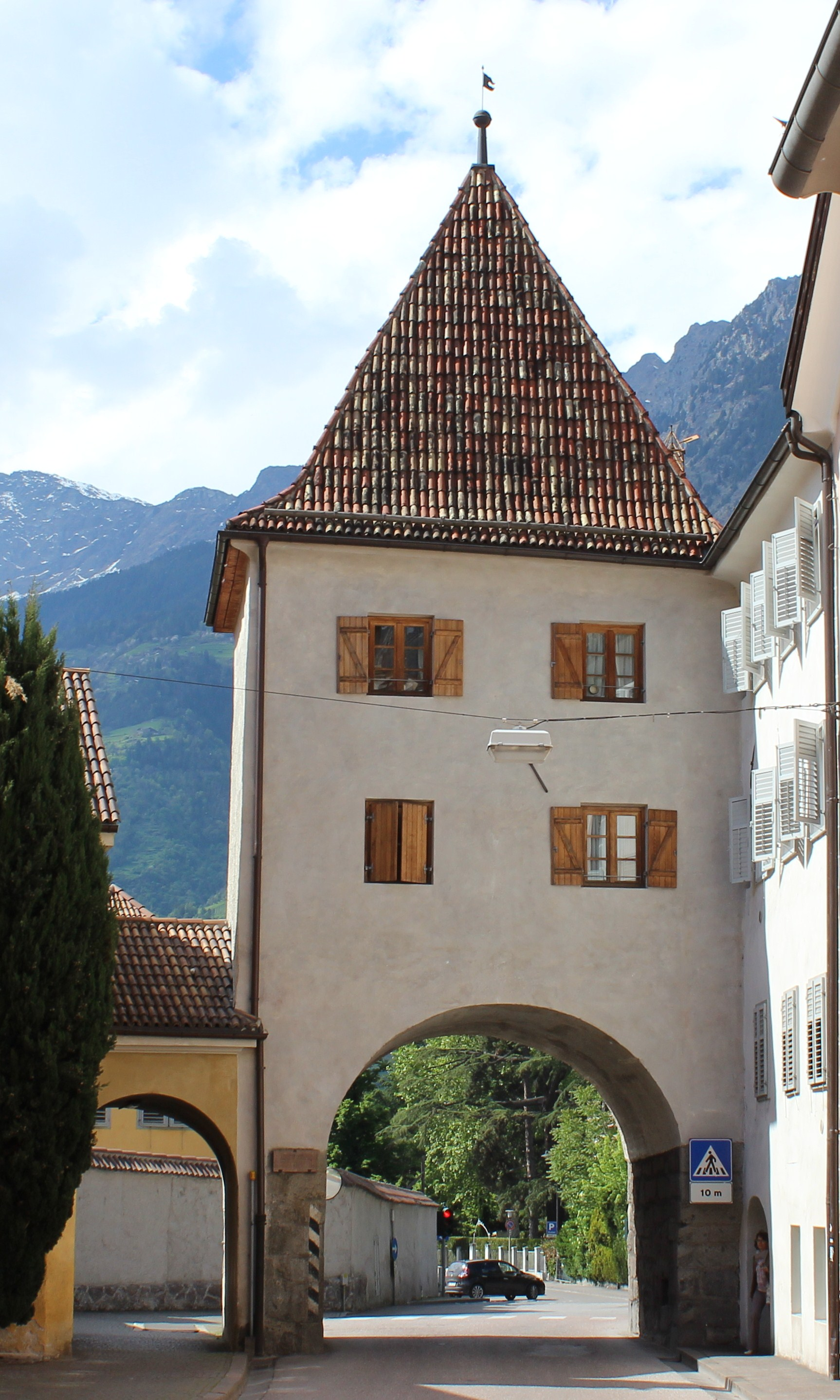
The Vinschgauer Tor lies in the west of the old town

The town gates of Merano in South Tyrol date back to the medieval period and are one of the attractions of the town today.

== History ==
The town was originally fortified by a stone city wall that enclosed what is today the old town. Access to town was possible through four gates that were positioned in the cardinal directions. All four gates existed until 1881, when the Ulten Tor (Ulten Gate) was demolished to make way for a broadening of today's Rennweg road. A memorial plaque at a house indicates the former position of it. Apart from that, the other three gates have survived and underwent a number of restorations and repair.

== Gates ==
- The Vinschgauer Tor (Vinschgau Gate) was first mentioned in 1290 and is assumed to be the oldest of all gates. The gate stands at the western enclose of the old town at the Rennweg. It was renovated in the 18th century and used for a while as a prison and a detention house for debtors. The gate consists of a main stone arch for traffic and a minor arch to the side for pedestrians. On top of it are two storeys that have four windows on either side of it, with wooden shutters. The facade to the outside (facing west) of the old town has a fresco with the coat of arms of Austria with the archducal hat and the County of Tyrol. The gate has a large, pointed roof covered in shingles. The Meran Tramway used to pass underneath the gate in the 19th to mid-20th century, normal traffic still passes underneath it.

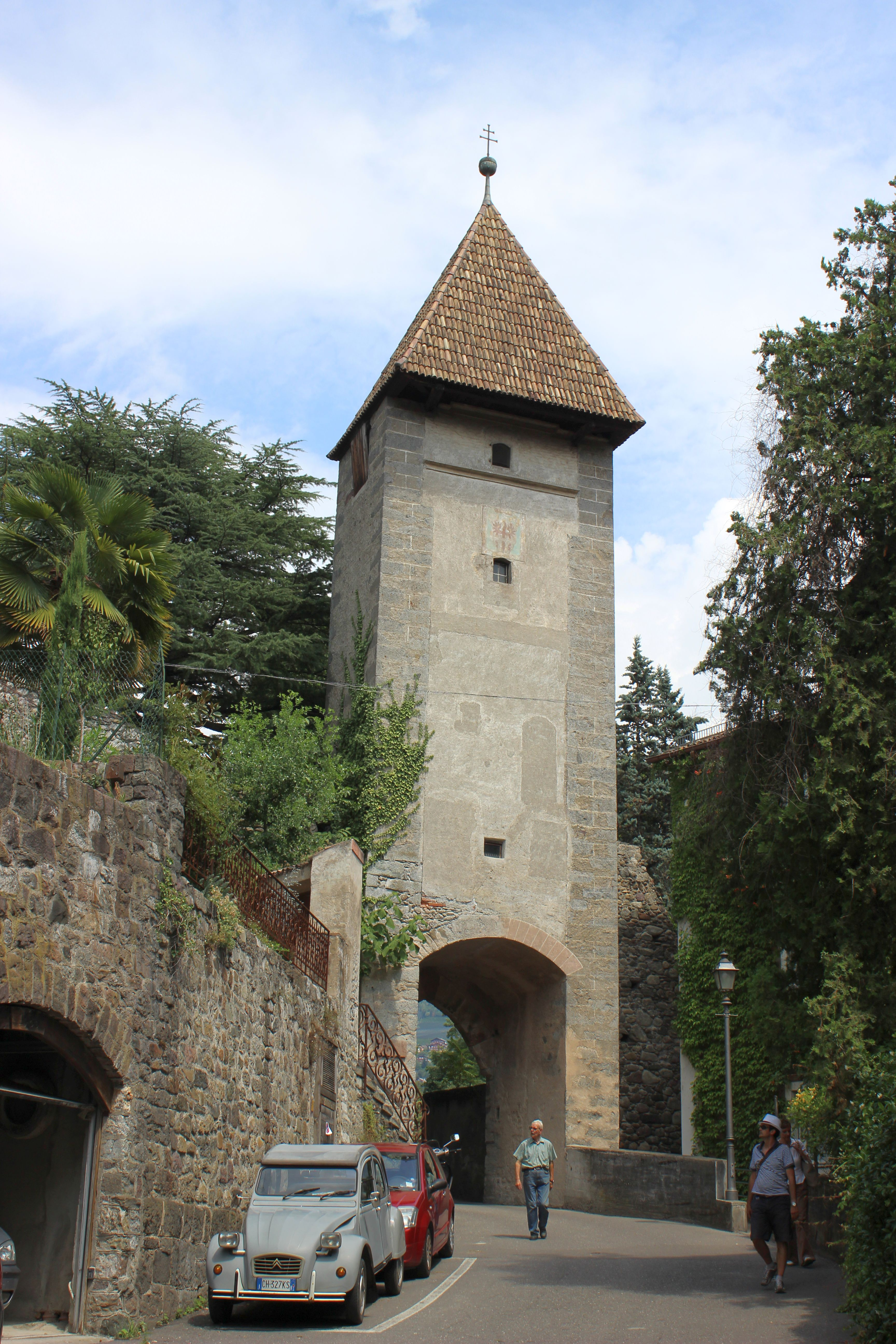
Passeier Tor in the north

- The Passeier Tor (Passer Gate) dates to the 15th century and lies to the north of the town. It is a tall, slim stone tower with a single arch and three storeys and very small windows that accentuate its fortified character. It has a tall, gabled roof. Underneath a small window to the inside (facing south) of the town is a fresco with the red eagle of the County of Tyrol. Parts of the old city fortifications are still remaining. The gate is close to the Passer river that flows through the town.

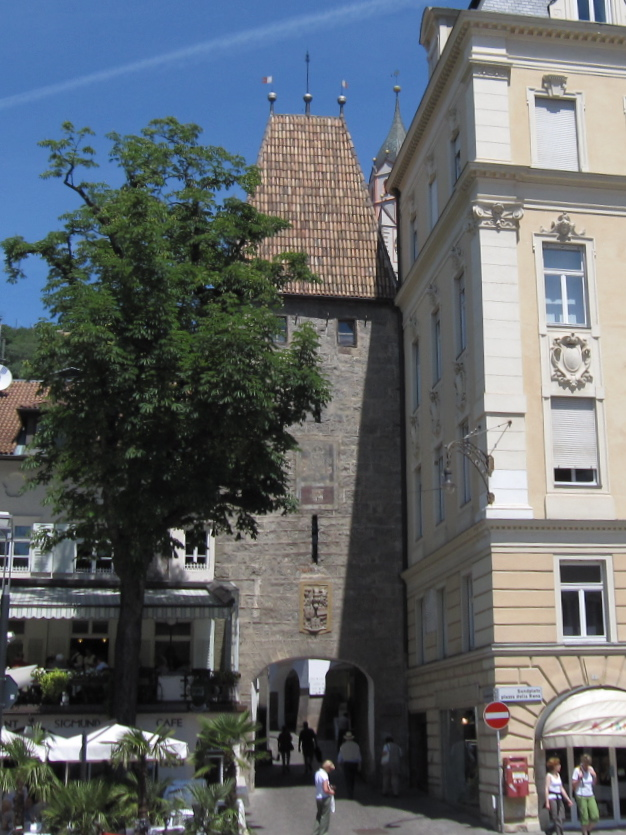
Bozener Tor in the south

- The Bozener Tor (Bozen Gate) dates to the 14th century and is located to the south facing the Sandplatz. It also has a single stone arch with three storeys and a very steep roof. To the outside is a coat of arms carved out of stone, with the coats of arms of Austria, Tyrol and the city. Above that is a fresco with the imperial eagle of the Habsburg dynasty, which is crowned and honoured by the chain of the Order of the Golden Fleece. To the left and the right of the imperial eagle are further coats of arms, amongst them Tyrol and Austria. It is considered by many to the most beautiful of all town gates.
