= Maria Bertolini =

Italian politician (1931–2022)

Maria Bertolini (17 September 1931 – 14 June 2022, married name Koppelstäter) was an Italian politician. She was a member of the Landtag of South Tyrol in its 7th, 8th, 9th and 10th sessions, representing the Bolzano constituency for the South Tyrolean People's Party (SVP, Südtiroler Volkspartei)

She was born in Merano on 17 September 1931.
