= Merano Town Hall =

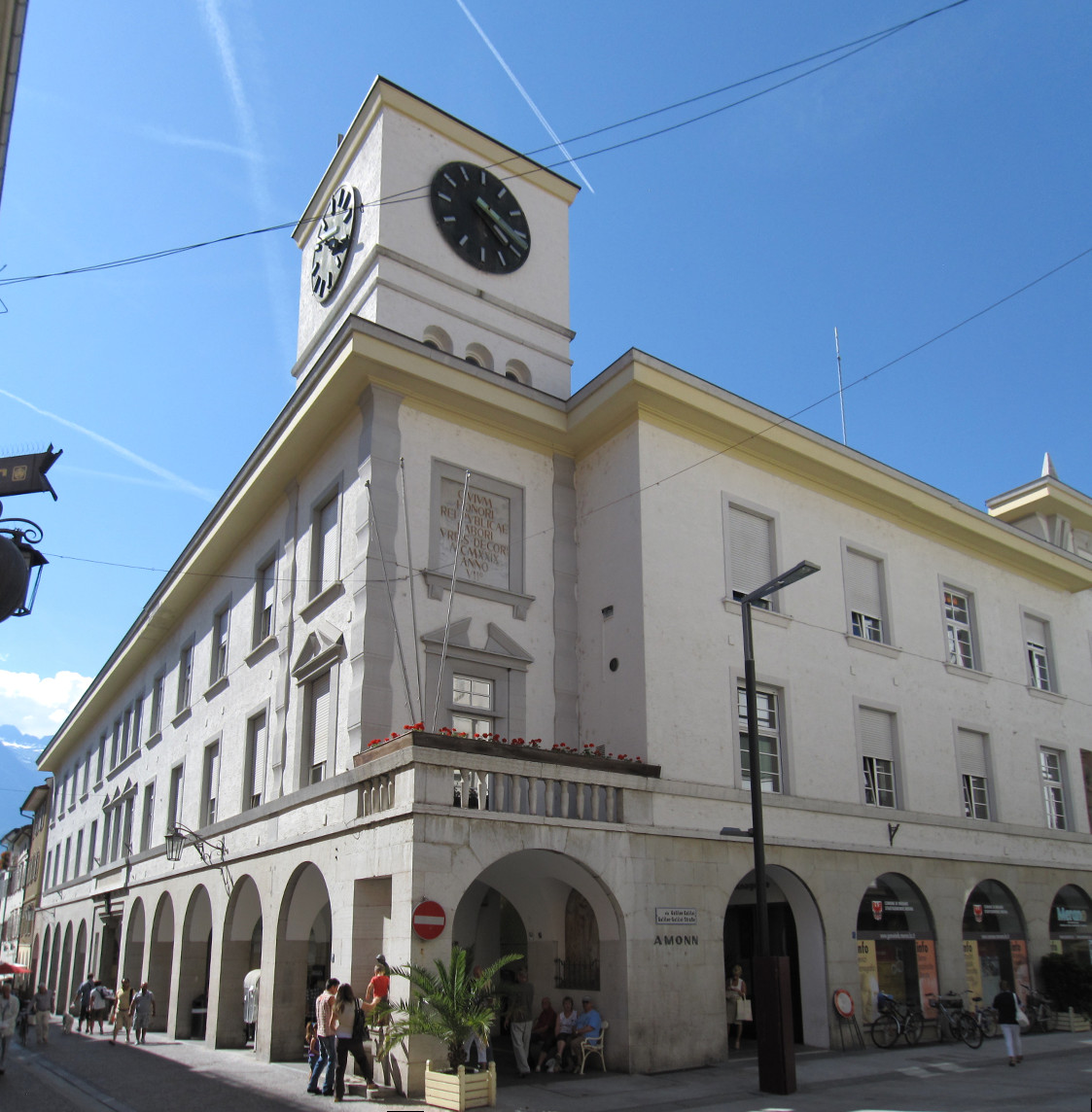
Town hall of Meran

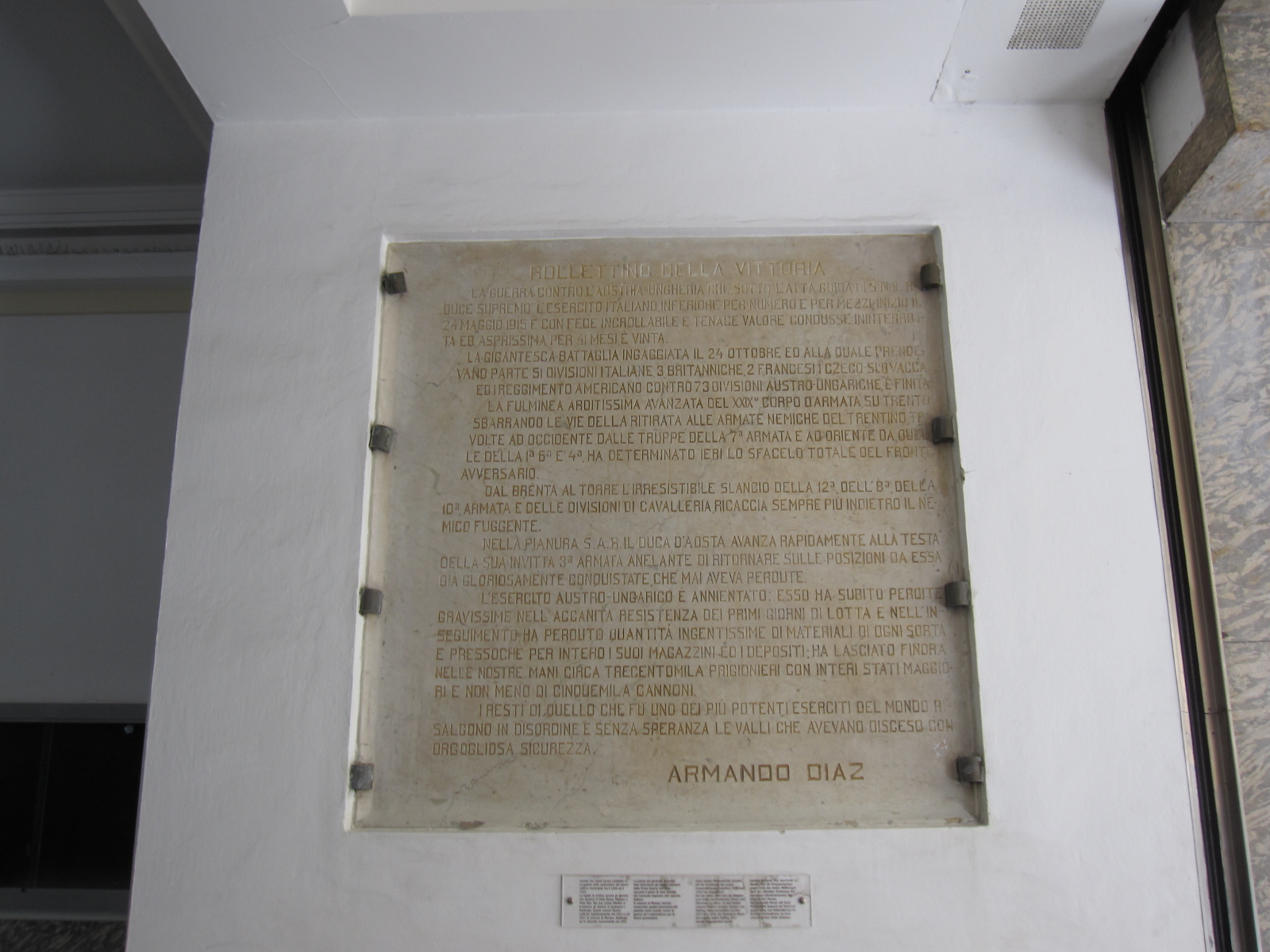
Fascist plaque installed by the government of Benito Mussolini

The Town Hall of Meran (German: Meraner Rathaus) in South Tyrol is the seat of the municipal government and assembly. It is located at the corner of the Laubengasse and the Galilei-Straße.

== History ==
The town hall used to be located at the corner of the Laubengasse and the Postgasse and dated from the times when Meran was part of Austria-Hungary. After the annexation following World War I to Italy, the fascist authorities decided to construct a new town hall. The Postgasse was renamed into Via Galilei as part of their Italianization campaign. The old town hall was ripped down and a new structure erected in the fascist style of the time between 1929-1932.

The architect was Ettore Sottsass sen., the exterior reliefs and the paintings are the work of the sculptor Albert Stolz (1875-1947). The building also consists of the arches that are the landmark of the Laubengasse. It has a clock tower with the inscription "CIVIVM / HONORI REI / PUBLICAE LABORI / VRBIS DECORI / MCMXXIX / ANNO VIIº" (To the citizens in honour, To the state in function, To the city as decoration, Fascist Year VII (1929)).

Inside the main entrance archway are two stone plaques. One shows the coats of arms of Meran and its districts. The other plaque was installed by the government of Benito Mussolini, giving their version of World War I with a quote by general Armando Diaz, which caused general offence to the native German-speaking population, who fought for Austria during the war. After World War II and the end of the Fascist regime, the plaque and its inscription was left intact, but a new plaque was added underneath it by the civic authorities which gives a proper account and points out to the origins of the old plaque within the historic context. The plaque serves today as a memorial, as a warning to future generations.
