= St. Nicholas' Church, Merano =

Italian church

Coordinates: 46°40′17″N 11°09′54″E

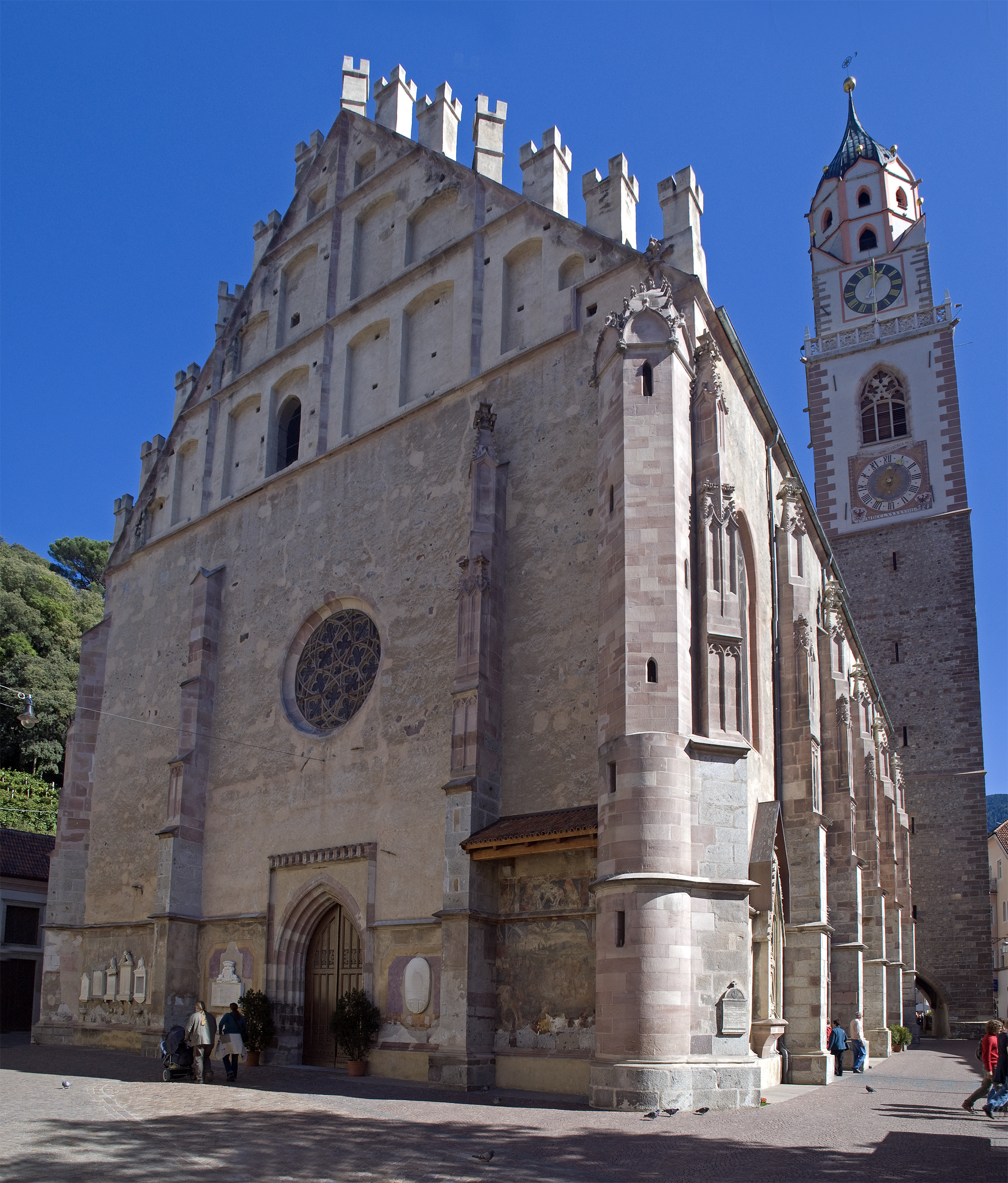
St. Nicholas' Church in Merano

The St. Nicholas' Church (Italian: Chiesa di San Nicolò; German: Pfarrkirche St. Nikolaus) or Duomo di Merano is the parish church of the town of Merano in South Tyrol, northern Italy.

It was built in the 13th century and dedicated to Saint Nicholas, the patron saint of the town. It is located at the end of the Laubengasse in the old town centre between the Domplatz and Pfarrplatz. The architectural style is mainly Gothic.

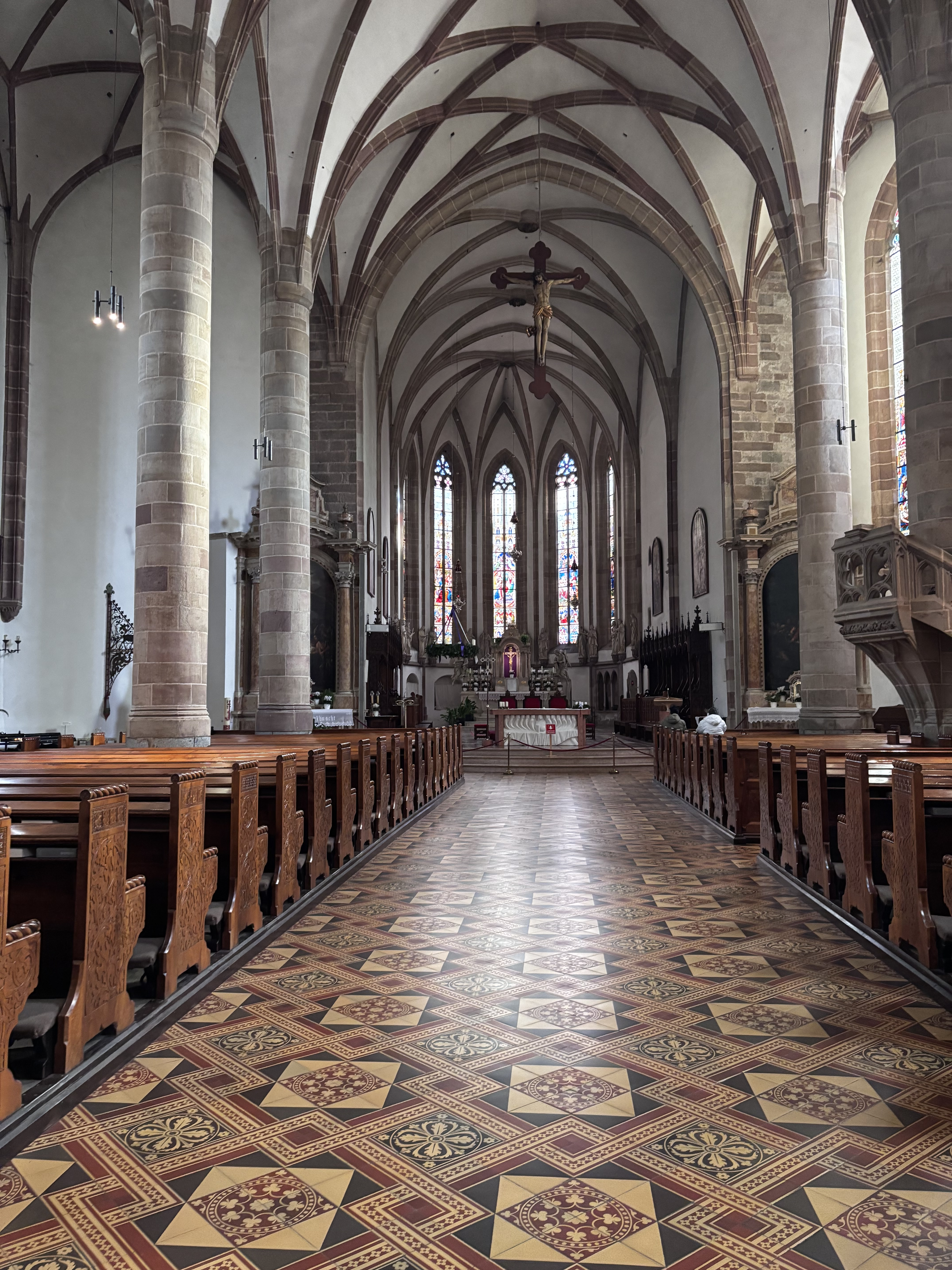
Interior of the church

The church consists of three naves. It has well-preserved stained glass windows, and a large rose window over a pointed arched portal, a number of wooden sculptures of saints and paintings that date from different periods. Of particular importance is the large altar and pulpit.

Outside is a tall clock tower with a sundial. Old tombstones line the walls and various paintings from the life of Jesus Christ.

Behind the church is St. Barbara's Chapel.
