= St. Barbara's Chapel, Merano =

Chapel building in Merano, Italy

Coordinates: 46°40′18″N 11°09′56″E

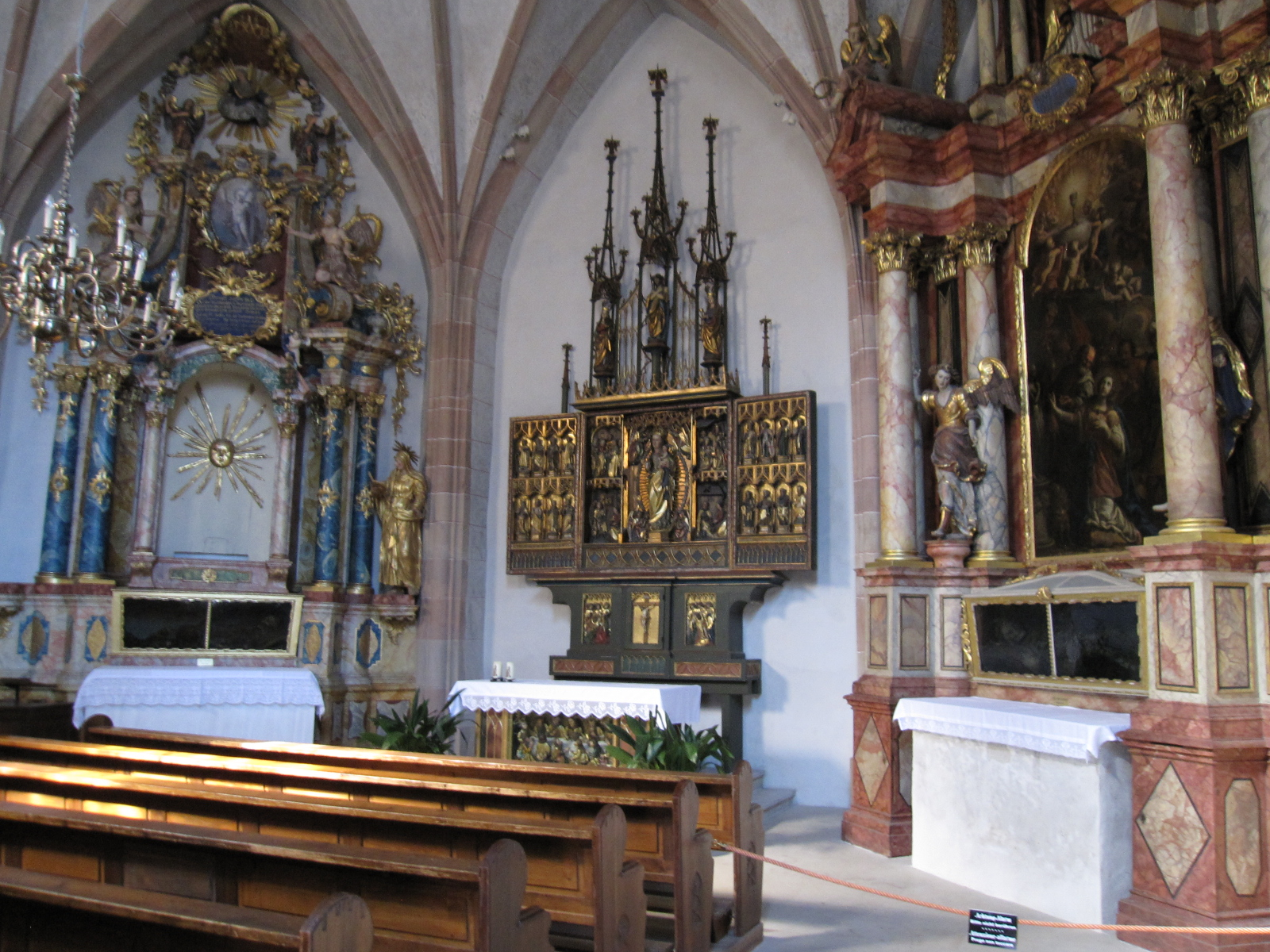
Interior of St. Barbara's Chapel in Merano

The St. Barbara's Chapel (German: St.-Barbara-Kapelle) is a chapel located in the town of Merano in South Tyrol, northern Italy.

The chapel stands right behind the St. Nicholas' Church, Merano. The layout of the chapel is octagonal. It was built by the architect Hans von Burghausen in 1450, who also designed the Hospital Church.

The chapel served as the burial chapel of the town for many centuries until the cemetery was moved to another location in 1848.

The basement served as the ossuary while the main floor was used for religious ceremonies and prayers. It features a number of wooden pews and a wooden Gothic altar, flanked by two altars from the Baroque period. Outside the entrance has a painting depicting Saint Christopher.
