= Queen Elisabeth Park, Gödöllő =

Public park in Gödöllő, Hungary

Coordinates: 47°35′41″N 19°20′46″E

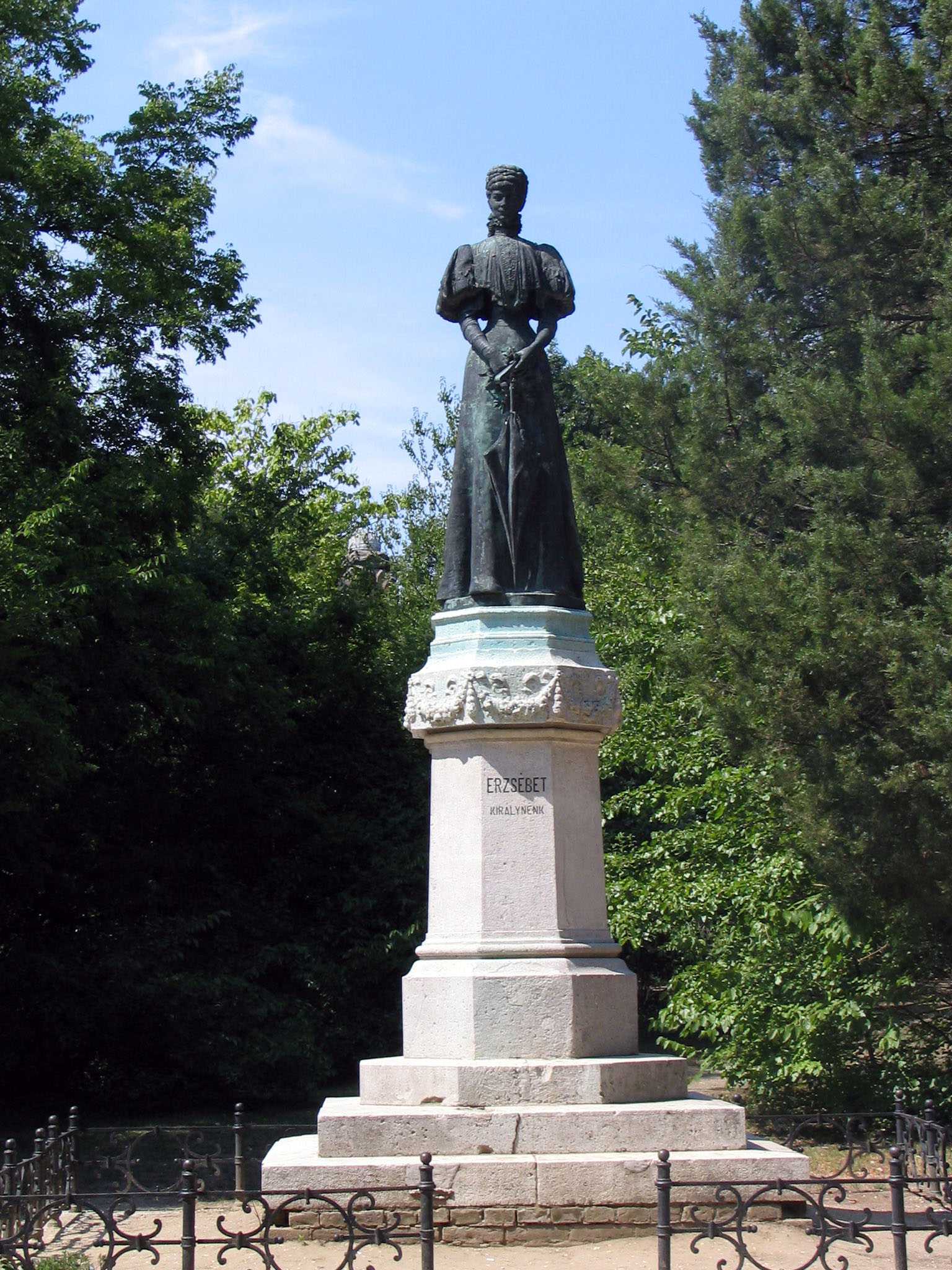
Monument to Queen Elisabeth of Hungary in the park named after her honour in Gödöllő

The Queen Elisabeth Park (Hungarian: Erzsebet Kiralyne Park) is a public park in town of Gödöllő, central Hungary.

== History ==
The park was created in November 1898 in honour of Queen Elisabeth of Hungary, Empress of Austria, who was assassinated by an anarchist in Geneva on September 10, 1898. Gödöllő Palace and the surrounding park and landscape was her favourite summer palace, where she came with the king and the children. Elisabeth was known to speak fluently Hungarian and always had great love for the Hungarian people. In 1901 the Hungarian sculptor József Róna created the bronze monument of the empress-queen at the end of an avenue of trees. The park was inaugurated by Emperor Franz Joseph I of Austria, her widower.

Behind the monument, there is another monument to the crown on a man-made stone hill. The park is a favourite place for visitors in spring and fall.

== See also ==
- Queen Elisabeth Park, Esztergom
- Empress Elisabeth Park
