= Marienberg Abbey =

Benedictine abbey in Mals, Vinschgau in South Tyrol, northern Italy

Coordinates: 46°42′24″N 10°31′10″E

Marienberg Abbey (Abtei Marienberg/Abbazia Monte Maria)
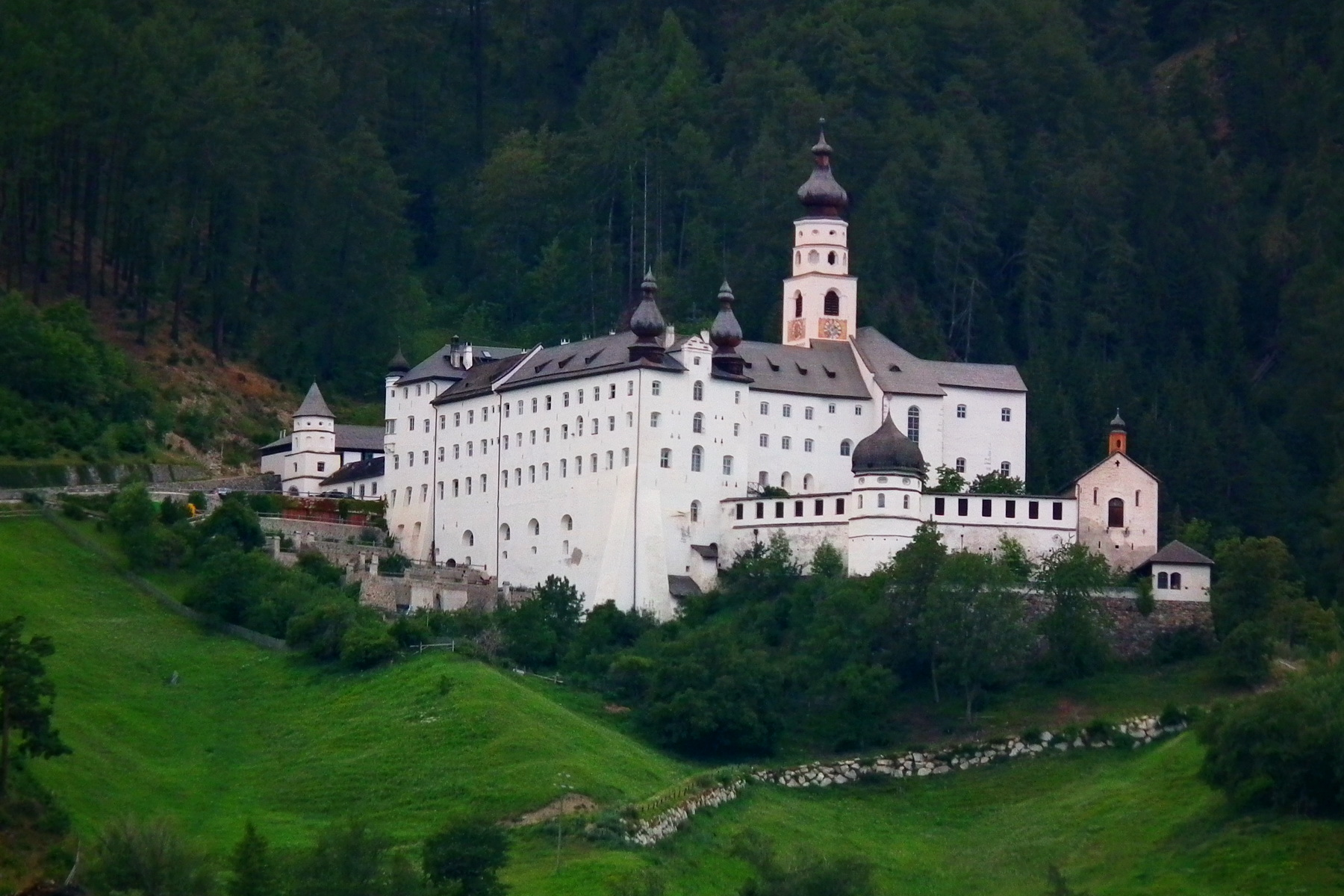
- Marienberg Abbey

Religion
- Affiliation: Roman Catholic
- Province: South Tyrol

Location
- Location: Mals, Italy
- Interactive map of Marienberg Abbey (Abtei Marienberg/Abbazia Monte Maria)

Architecture
- Type: Church
- Style: Romanesque/Baroque
- Groundbreaking: 8c

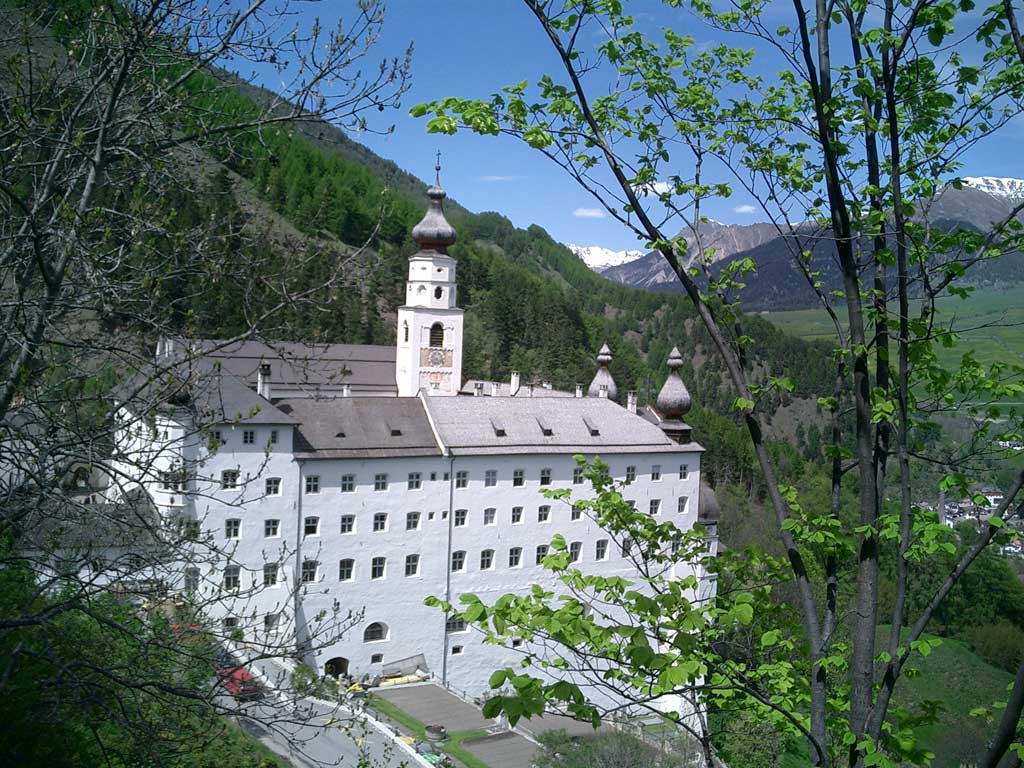
Marienberg Abbey

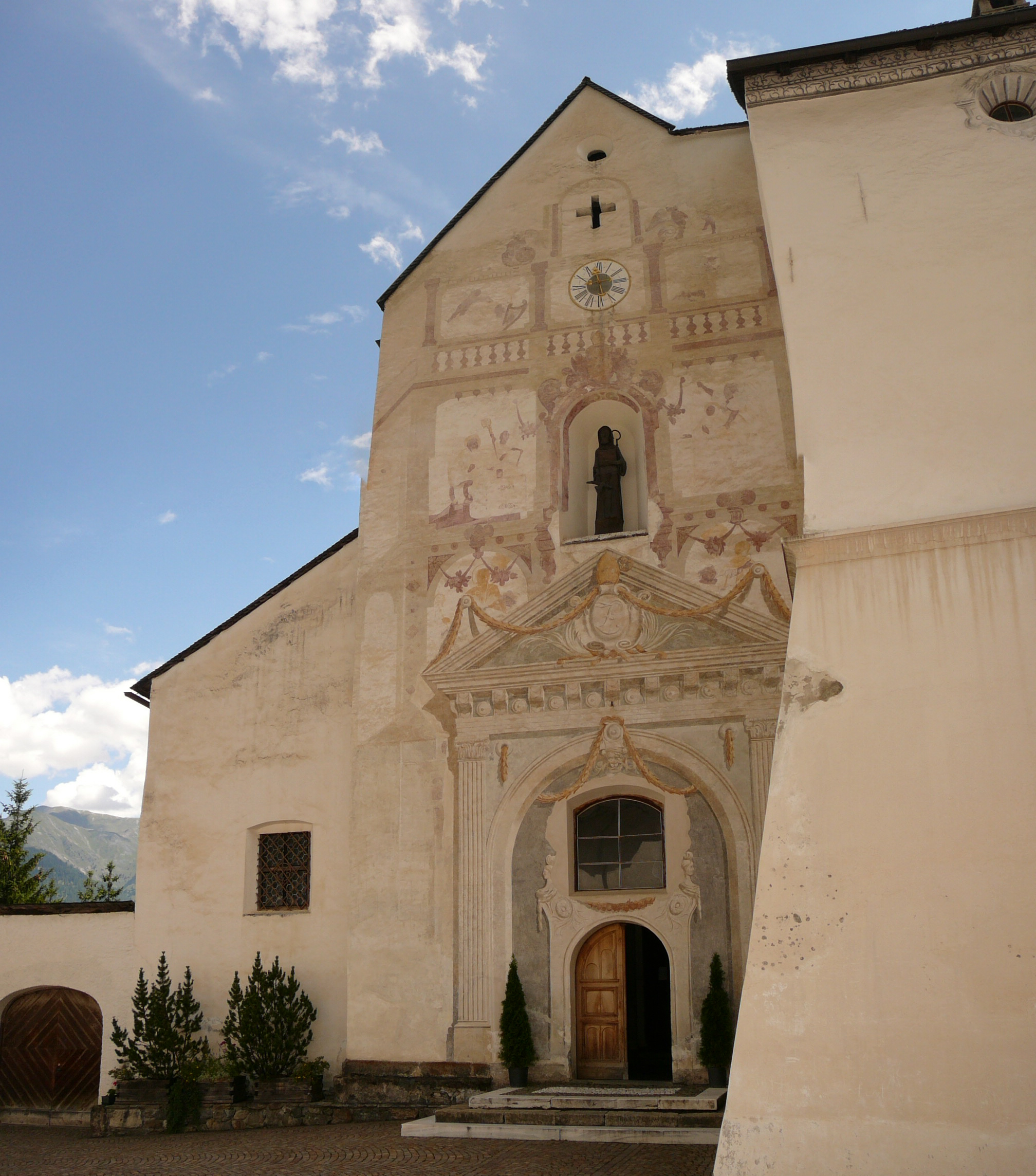
Church of Marienberg Abbey

Marienberg Abbey (German: Abtei Marienberg; Italian: Abbazia Monte Maria) is a Benedictine abbey in Mals, Vinschgau in South Tyrol, northern Italy. It was founded in 1149 or 1150 by Ulrich von Tarasp and other nobles.

It has maintained a long tradition of education and, at 1,340 m, it is Europe’s highest abbey. It retains a Baroque style with Romanesque elements, and has some well-maintained frescos.

== History ==
The history of the foundation goes back to Charlemagne, who established the St. John Benedictine monastery between 780 and 786 in Müstair further up in the valley.

Sometime after 880, the Benedictine monastery was dissolved and re-established as a convent for both sexes. About two hundred years later there was a reorganization, when Eberhard of Tarasp built the monastery of Schuls in the Inn valley in the Engadin for the male portion of the community, while nuns remained at Taufers in the Adige valley. After the monastery at Schuls had been rebuilt and reconsecrated in 1131, Ulrich von Tarasp called monks from the German monastery of Ottobeuren to revive it; the additional numbers made it possible to raise the community from a priory to an abbey. In 1149 or 1150 the community was re-settled on the hill near the village of Burgeis, under the name of Marienberg.

About one hundred years after its foundation the abbey suffered from serious conflict. It was sacked twice by nobles under Abbot Konrad III (1271–98) and in 1304 Abbot Hermann was killed by Ulrich of Matsch. The Black Death killed all but four members of the abbey including Abbot Wyho and Goswin, a lay brother, who later became a priest and chronicled the history of the monastery. This chronicle is divided into three books, the first of which details the story of the foundation and donations to the abbey. The second book of the chronicle is a history of the abbots, and the third recites the privileges conferred by popes and princes. It gives an account, without regard for order or chronology, of the founders, fortunes, benefactors and oppressors of the monastery. Goswin later became a prior of the abbey and court chaplain to Duke Leopold III of Austria.

In 1418 Marienberg was burned down and was later rebuilt.

After a period of decline in the sixteenth century, several German monks helped to restore and expand the abbey. Abbot Mathias Lang (1615–40), from Weingarten Abbey, reformed it, and in 1634 Marienberg joined the Benedictine Congregation of Swabia. Lang's successor, Jacob Grafinger (1640–53), enlarged the library, and made the younger members finish their education at schools of repute. In 1656 the abbey was again burned down. Abbot Johann Baptist Murr (1705–32) in 1724 founded a humanistic high school in Meran which is still administered by the monks of Marienberg. Abbot Placidus Zobel (1782-1815) compiled a chronicle of the abbots.

In 1807 Marienberg was dissolved by the Bavarian government, but was restored by Emperor Francis II in 1816.

Today the monks specialise in adult education: weekend courses and longer retreats are held at the abbey. The abbey itself is available for tours.
