= Merano Tramway =

Coordinates: 46°40′14″N 11°09′34″E

Overview
- Status: abandoned
- Termini: Merano railway station; Fountain Square
- Stations: 8

Service
- Type: passenger

History
- Opened: 9 May 1908
- Closed: 1956

Technical
- Line length: 7.80 km
- Track gauge: 1,000 mm (3 ft 3 3/8 in)
- Electrification: yes

The Merano Tramway was built and opened in 1908 to satisfy the urban transport requirement in the town of Merano, at that time an important town in the Austrian monarchy. There was already a tramway crossing the town, the Lana-Merano railway. The new tram line was to cross the town at right angles to the existing line.

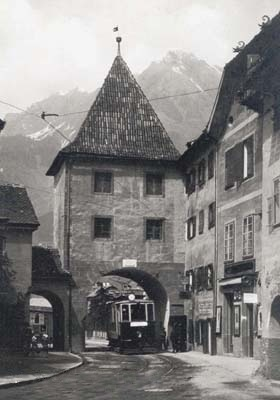
Tram passing underneath the Vinschgauer Tor (c. 1925)

The line started at the then-new Vinschger Bahn station, it went on to Mazzini Square and Theatre Square, where there was a junction with the Lana-Merano railway. After crossing the Post Bridge the line inclined sharply, and after eight kilometres it terminated at the Fountain Square in the Obermais quarter. The Tram Depot was at the rear of the cemetery, and is used today by the city's bus company. The profit of the company was not very high during the years the tram line operated. So after some time some of the cars were sold to the Bolzano Tramway company. In the 1950s, like many other railway lines in the region, the tram was substituted by a bus line.

Apart from the garage behind the cemetery, all traces of the line have been erased. In political campaigns by local politicians, there has been sometimes talk of reactivating the tram to reduce air pollution in the town, which today has a lot of traffic.

== Literature ==
- Josef Dultinger: Vergessene Vergangenheit. Verlag Dr. Rudolf Erhard, Rum 1982
- Josef Dultinger: Auf schmaler Spur durch Südtirol. Verlag Dr. Rudolf Erhard, Rum 1982
