= Merano =

Merano Meran (German)
- Comune
- Comune di Merano; Stadtgemeinde Meran
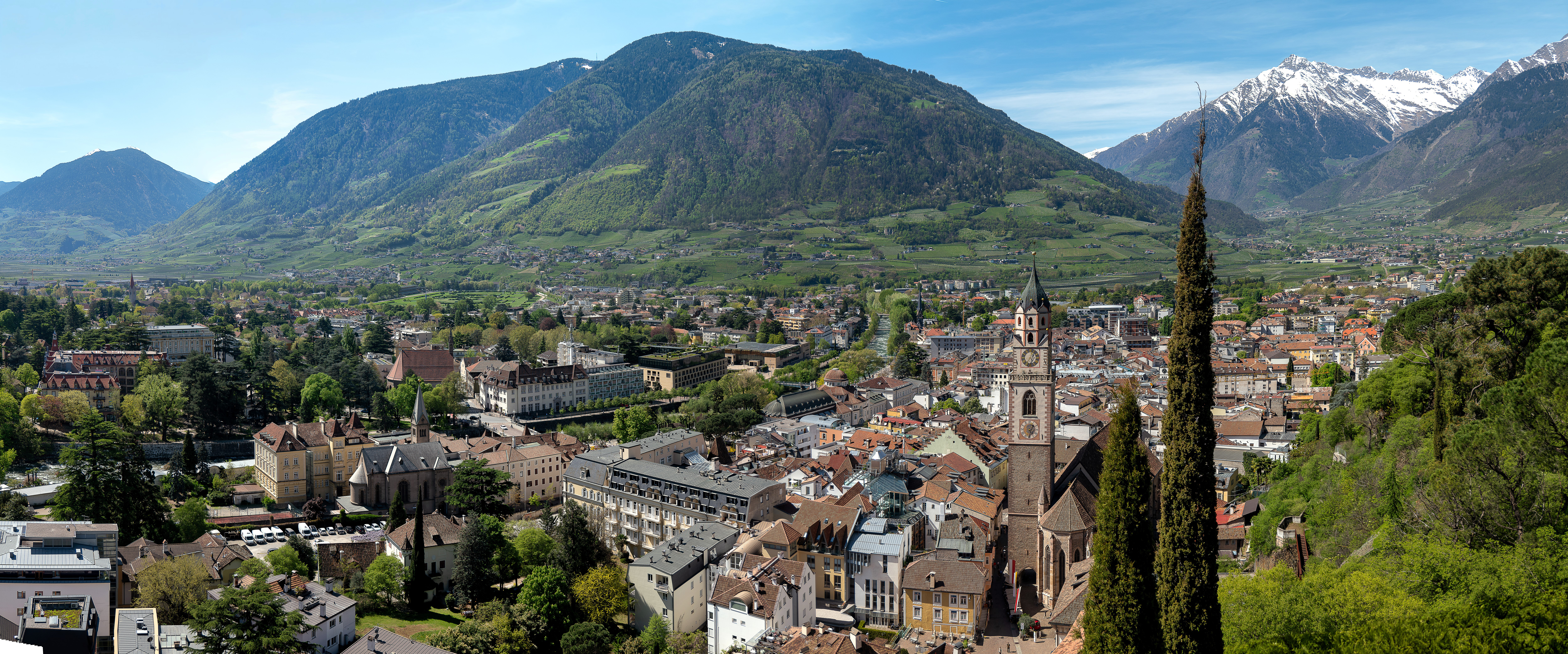
- View of Merano

- Flag Coat of arms

- Location within Italy Location within Trentino-Alto Adige/Südtirol
- Coordinates: 46°40′N 11°10′E
- Country: Italy
- Region: Trentino-Alto Adige/Südtirol
- Province: South Tyrol (BZ)
- Frazioni: Centro (Altstadt), Maia Alta (Obermais), Maia Bassa (Untermais), Quarazze (Gratsch), Sinigo (Sinich), Labers

Government
  - Mayor: Katharina Zeller

Area
  - Total: 26.34 km^{2} (10.17 sq mi)
- Elevation: 325 m (1,066 ft)

Population (31-12-2024)
  - Total: 42,046
  - Density: 1,596/km^{2} (4,134/sq mi)
- Demonym: Meraner (de) Meranese (it)
- Time zone: UTC+1 (CET)
  - Summer (DST): UTC+2 (CEST)
- Postal code: 39012
- Dialing code: 0473
- Patron saint: St Nicholas
- Saint day: December 6
- Website: Official website

Merano (Note: UK: /məˈrɑːnoʊ/, US: /meɪˈ-/; Italian: [meˈraːno]) or Meran (Note: German: [meˈʁaːn]) is a comune (municipality) in South Tyrol, Northern Italy. The city is located within a basin, surrounded by mountains standing up to 3,335 metres (10,942 feet) above sea level, at the entrance to the Passeier Valley and the Vinschgau. It is the second-largest city in South Tyrol after Bozen/Bolzano and serves as an important cultural and economic centre.

The city began as a medieval Tyrolean settlement and became the capital of the County of Tyrol in the 13th century, before political power later shifted to Innsbruck. In the 19th century, its mild Alpine climate transformed Meran into a renowned spa town within the Austro-Hungarian Empire, attracting several scientists, literary people, and artists, including Franz Kafka, Paul Lazarsfeld and also Empress Elisabeth of Austria, who appreciated its mild climate. After World War I, it was annexed by the Kingdom of Italy along with South Tyrol.

Today Merano is known for its blend of Austrian and Italian cultural heritage, spa resorts, and historical architecture.

== Name ==
Both the Italian (Merano) and the German (Meran) names for the city are used in English. The Ladin form of the name is Maran. The official name of the municipality (comune) is Comune di Merano in Italian and Stadtgemeinde Meran in German (both are in official use).

== History ==
Archaic names of the city are Mairania (from AD 857) and an der Meran (from the 15th century). In 17th-century Latin, the city was called Meranum.

=== Origin ===
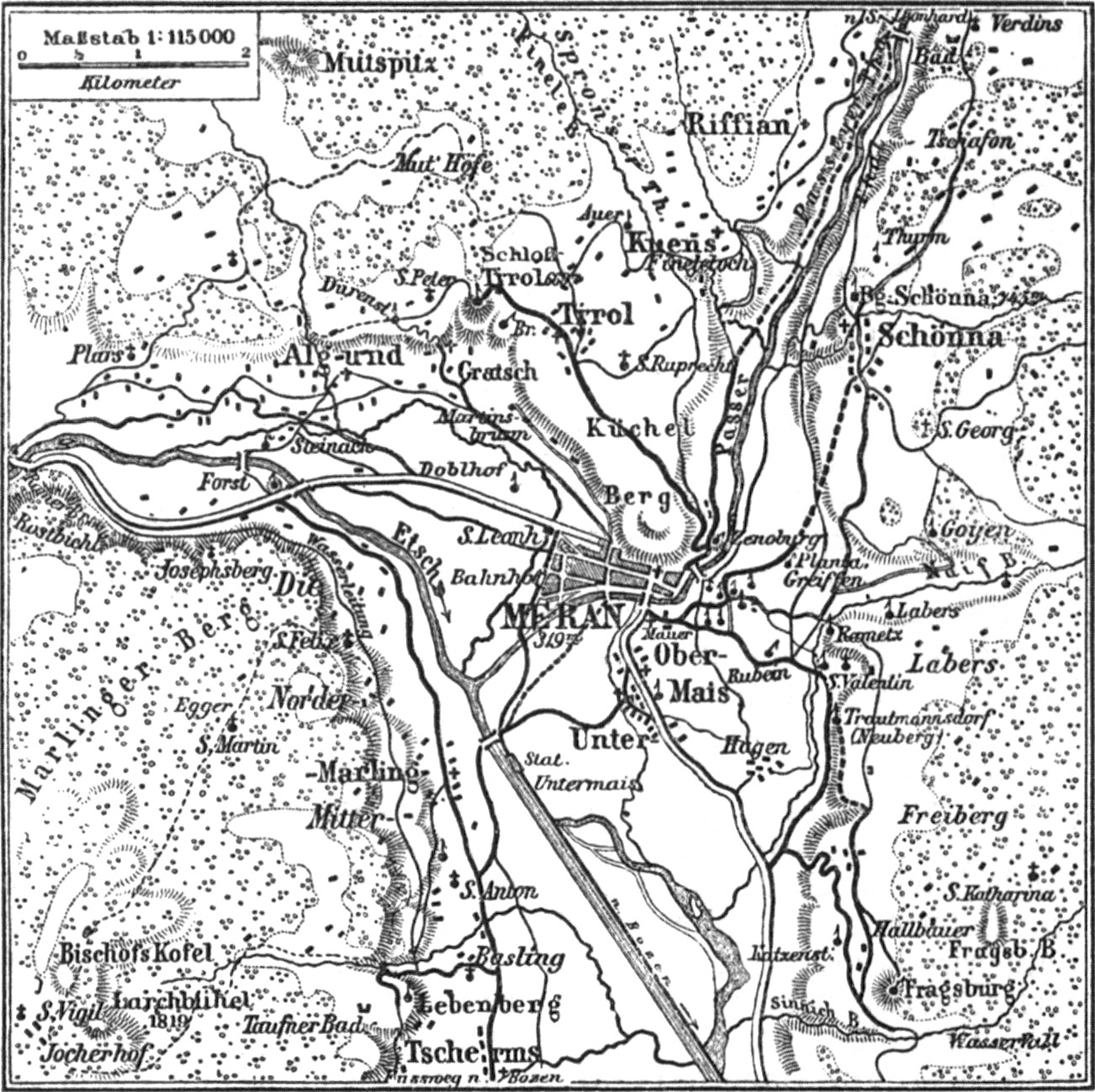
Historical map of the city and surrounding area (1888)

The area has been inhabited since the third millennium BC, as shown by the presence of menhirs and other finds. The story of the city proper began in 15 BC when the Romans occupied the Adige valley founding a road station, Statio Maiensis.

The settlement was first mentioned in an 857 deed as Mairania. The Counts at Castle Tyrol elevated Merano to the status of a city during the 13th century and made it the capital of their County of Tyrol. After the county had been handed over to the Habsburg dynasty in 1363 upon the abdication of Margaret, Countess of Tyrol, in 1420 Duke Friedrich IV of Austria moved the Tyrolean court to Innsbruck. Though Merano remained the official capital until 1848, it subsequently lost its predominant position and almost all its importance as an economic hub across the roads connecting Italy and Germany. The important mint was also moved to Hall in Tirol in 1477.

=== Modern history ===
The Tyrolean Rebellion of 1809 against the French occupation drew attention again to Merano. In that year, on the Küchelberg above the city, a peasants' army eked out a victory against the united French and Bavarian forces before their revolt was finally crushed. After World War I, under the Treaty of Saint-Germain-en-Laye, Merano became part of the Kingdom of Italy with the rest of the southern part of the former Cisleithanian crown land of Tyrol.

During the Nazi occupation of the region in 1943–5, the Meranese Jewish population was almost completely deported and murdered within concentration camps.

=== Coat of arms ===
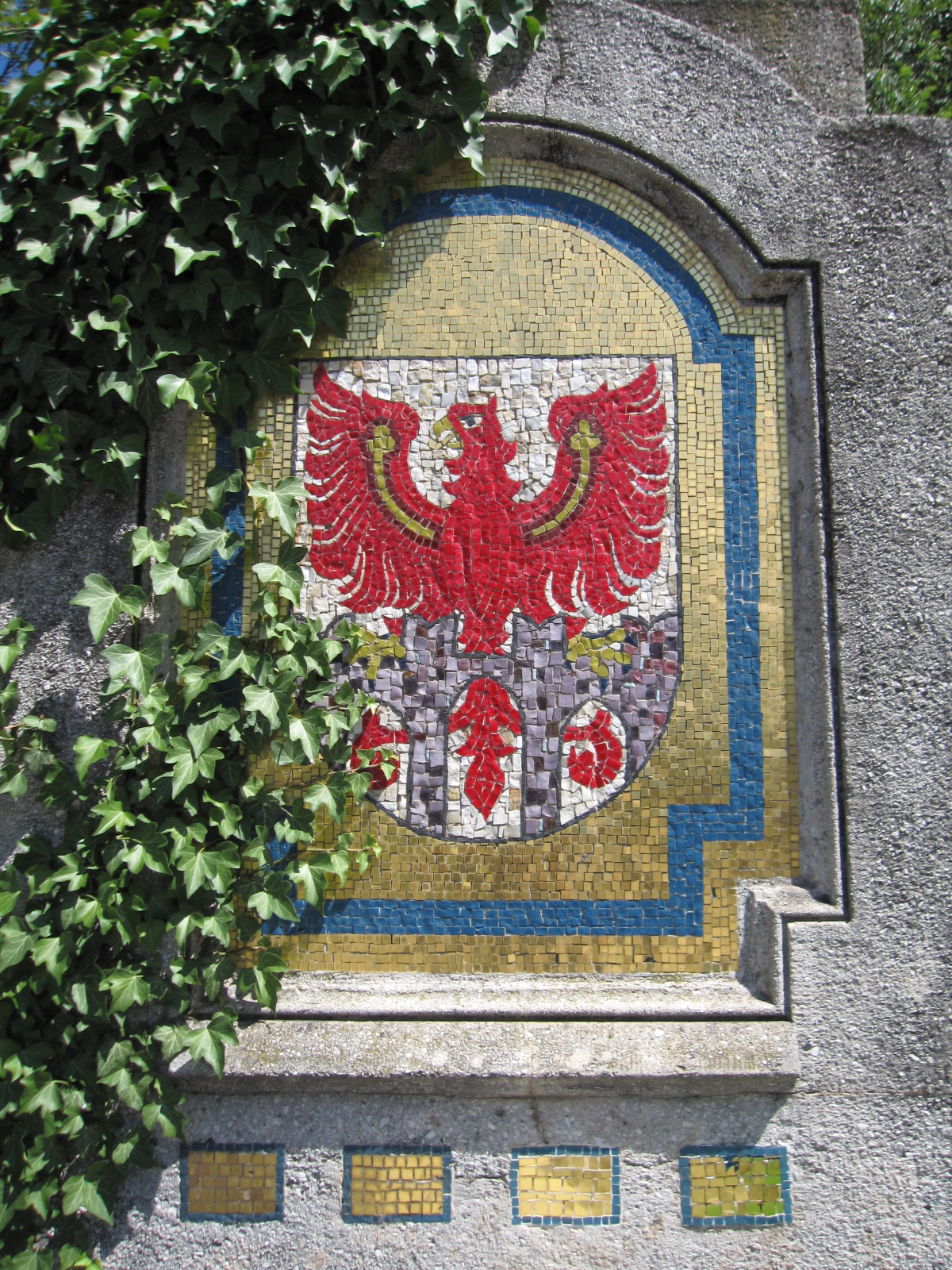
The city's coat of arms on the Postbrücke (postal bridge)

The city's coat of arms depicts the red Tyrolean eagle sitting on a wall with four pieces of Ghibelline battlements and three arches that symbolize the city.

The arms is known from the 14th century and the oldest seal dates from 1353, while the coloured one since 1390. In a 1759 image, the eagle is represented with a crown and a green wreath of honour.

After World War I and the annexation of the city from Austria-Hungary to Italy, it was given a new coat of arms in 1928, which looked similar to the old one, but with five parts of the battlements and the arches with the gates opened on a lawn of shamrock. A mural crown was placed above the shield. The five parts of the battlement represented the districts of Maia Bassa, Merano (old city), Maia Alta, Quarazze and Avelengo, which were incorporated into the city by the Italian fascists. After World War II, Avelengo became independent again and the historical coat of arms was restored.

== Main sights ==
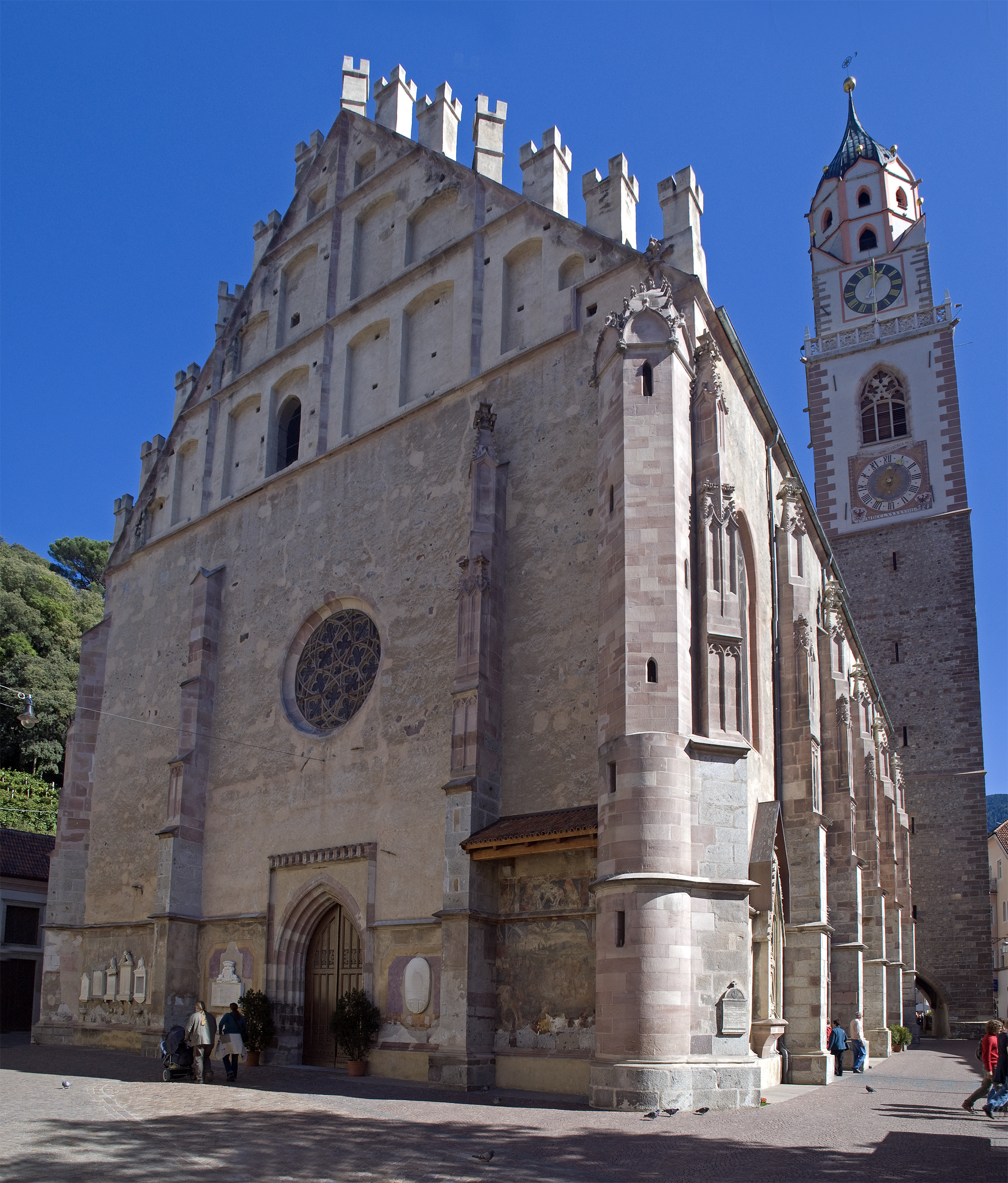
St. Nicholas' Church

Among the city's landmarks are the medieval city gates such as the Vinschgauer Tor, Passeirer Tor, and the Bozener Tor. Also belonging to the fortifications is the medieval Ortenstein tower, popularly called Pulverturm (lit. "powder tower").

The main churches are the Gothic St. Nicholas' Church and the St. Barbara's Chapel, both dating to the 15th century. Also dating to this period is the Princely Castle (Landesfürstliche Burg), which was a residence of Sigismund, Archduke of Austria.

The Steinerner Steg stone bridge crosses the Passer river and dates to the 17th century.

The city saw further development as it became increasingly popular as a spa resort, especially after Empress Elisabeth of Austria started visiting. Dating from the 19th century are the Stadttheater Meran, the Kurhaus of Meran and the Empress Elisabeth Park. Also famous are the arched Wandelhalle promenades along the river.

After the annexation of the city by Italy in 1919, the Fascist authorities constructed the new Meran Town Hall in the 1920s.

In Obermais, the Villa Freischütz museum displays an upper-middle class interior.

Outside the city is Trauttmansdorff Castle and its gardens. Located there is the Museum of Tourism, which was opened in the spring of 2003 and shows the historical development of tourism in the province. Tirol Castle is also close by.

== Climate ==
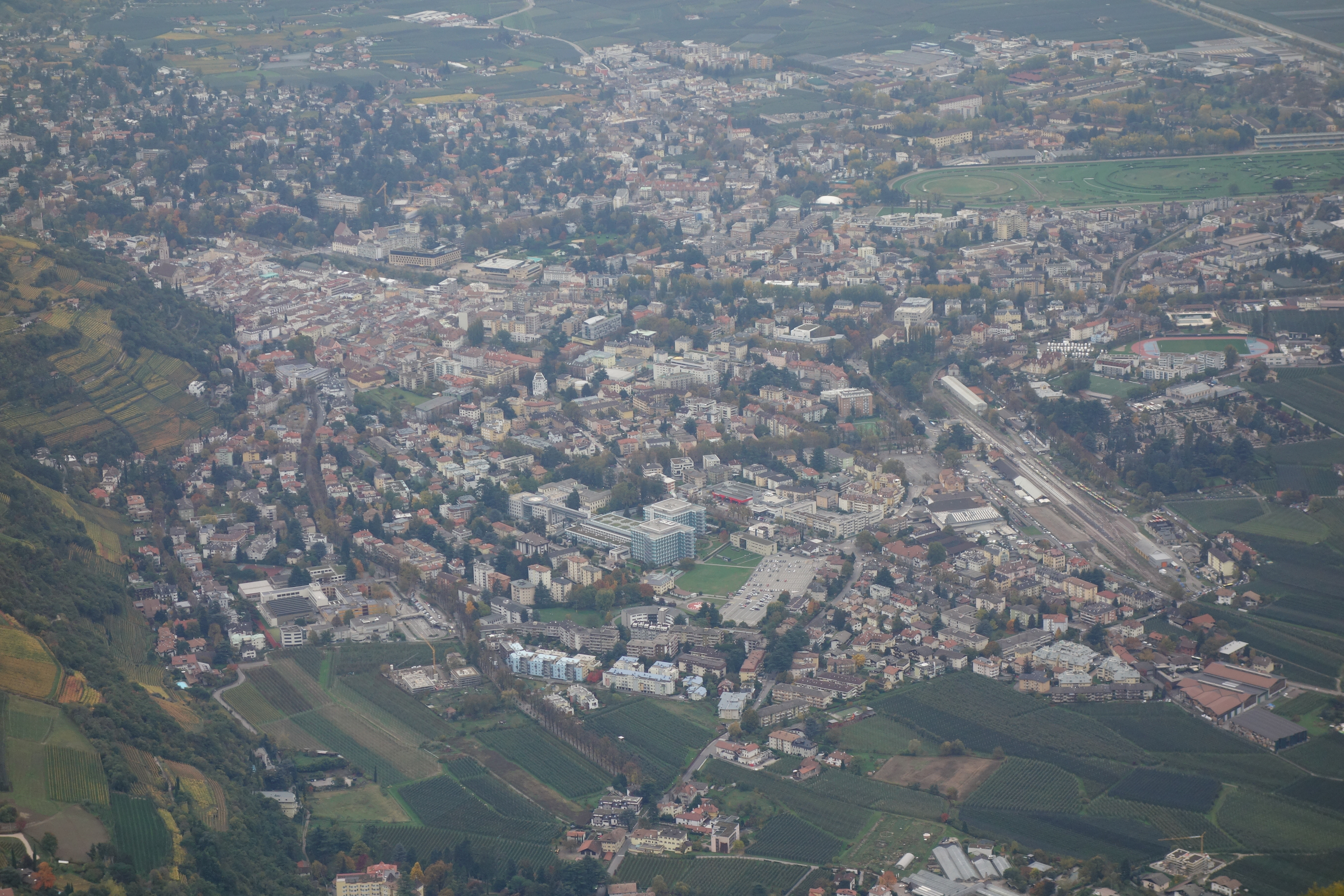
Merano as seen from the Hochmuth

Merano is on the borderline between several climates. Officially, it has an oceanic climate (Cfb). However, it is close to being humid subtropical (Cfa) due to the mean temperature in July being just under 22 °C; even on those terms, the overnight lows in the winter bring the mean temperatures low enough for the city as a whole to have continental (Dfa/Dfb) influences with more distinct seasons.

The average daily temperatures in summer in Merano lie between 27 and 30 °C, while at night temperatures usually drop to between 12 and 15 °C. The average daily temperatures in winter lie between 6 and 10 °C, while at night temperatures usually drop to between -4 and -2 °C. The wettest month is August with 96 mm, while the driest is February with only 25 mm. This data was measured at the weather station Merano/Gratsch at an altitude of 333 metres between 1983 and 2017.

Climate data for Merano (1983–2017)
| Month | Jan | Feb | Mar | Apr | May | Jun | Jul | Aug | Sep | Oct | Nov | Dec | Year |
|---|---|---|---|---|---|---|---|---|---|---|---|---|---|
| Record high °C (°F) | 21 (70) | 23 (73) | 27 (81) | 31 (88) | 37 (99) | 39 (102) | 40 (104) | 40 (104) | 35 (95) | 29 (84) | 21 (70) | 19 (66) | 40 (104) |
| Mean daily maximum °C (°F) | 6.4 (43.5) | 9.6 (49.3) | 15.1 (59.2) | 18.8 (65.8) | 23.5 (74.3) | 27.2 (81.0) | 29.6 (85.3) | 28.6 (83.5) | 23.7 (74.7) | 17.9 (64.2) | 10.9 (51.6) | 6.5 (43.7) | 18.2 (64.8) |
| Daily mean °C (°F) | 1.3 (34.3) | 3.8 (38.8) | 8.4 (47.1) | 12.0 (53.6) | 16.4 (61.5) | 19.8 (67.6) | 21.9 (71.4) | 21.3 (70.3) | 17.1 (62.8) | 12.1 (53.8) | 5.7 (42.3) | 1.7 (35.1) | 11.8 (53.2) |
| Mean daily minimum °C (°F) | −4.0 (24.8) | −2.3 (27.9) | 1.6 (34.9) | 5.0 (41.0) | 9.3 (48.7) | 12.4 (54.3) | 14.2 (57.6) | 13.9 (57.0) | 10.2 (50.4) | 6.1 (43.0) | 0.5 (32.9) | −3.3 (26.1) | 5.3 (41.5) |
| Record low °C (°F) | −19 (−2) | −13 (9) | −12 (10) | −4 (25) | −2 (28) | 2 (36) | 2 (36) | 1 (34) | −2 (28) | −8 (18) | −10 (14) | −13 (9) | −19 (−2) |
| Average precipitation mm (inches) | 26.4 (1.04) | 24.5 (0.96) | 36.9 (1.45) | 61.7 (2.43) | 80.0 (3.15) | 94.7 (3.73) | 83.8 (3.30) | 96.3 (3.79) | 72.3 (2.85) | 74.9 (2.95) | 84.5 (3.33) | 37.9 (1.49) | 773.8 (30.46) |
Source: Landeswetterdienst Südtirol

== Culture ==
=== Food ===
The area is well known for its wines, both white and red, and vineyards extend right into the city. The local wine, Meraner Leiten (Meranese di collina), is a light red wine, best drunk young. There are also extensive orchards, and apples are exported throughout Europe. The Forst Brewery on the edge of the city produces a popular range of beers, sold throughout Italy and Europe.

=== Cultural events ===
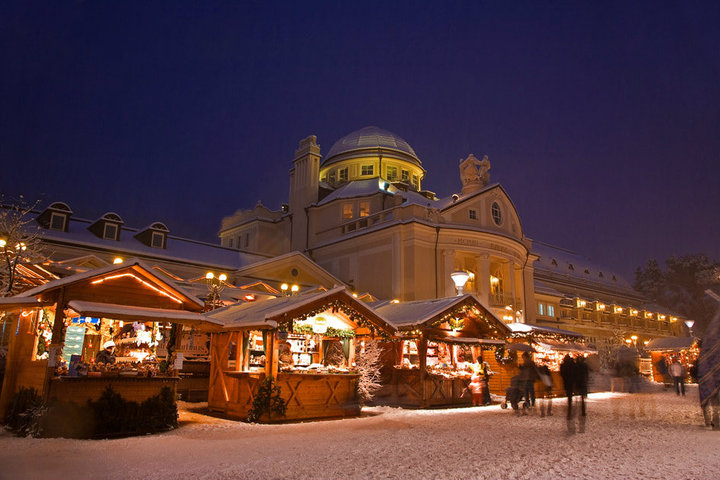
Christmas market Merano

Merano hosts the following events every year:

- Asfaltart
- Festival MeranOJazz
- Meraner Musikwochen
- Christmas market Merano
- Merano WineFestival

Every second year, the literature competition Merano Poetry Prize (Lyrikpreis Meran) is held in Merano.

== People ==
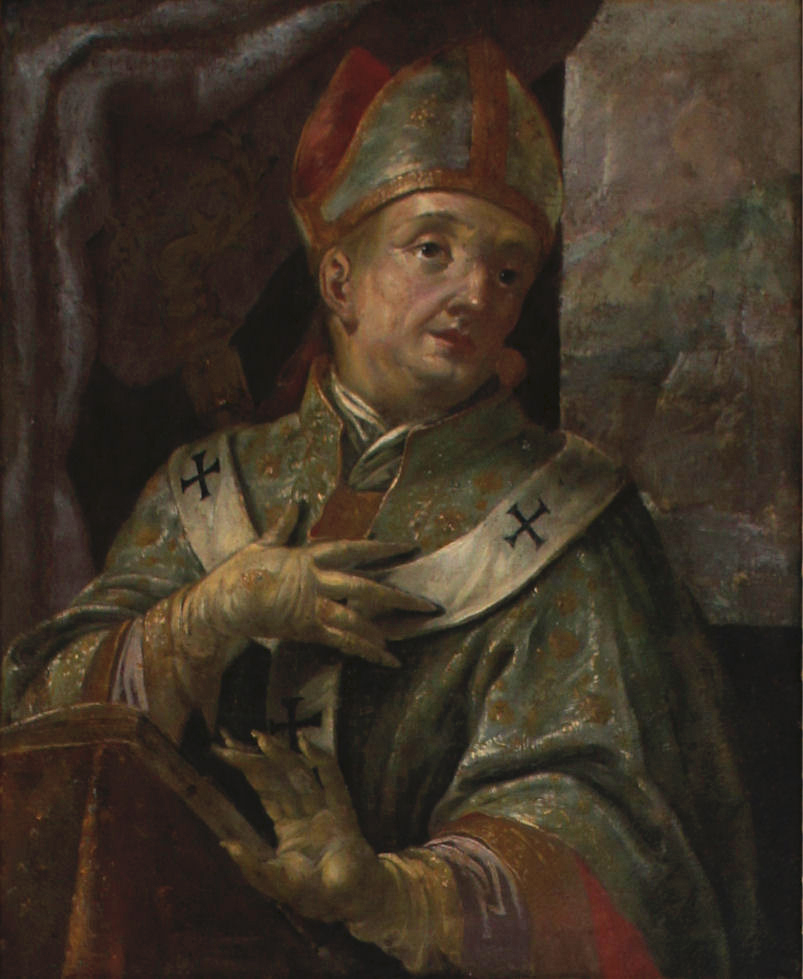
Arbeo of Freising

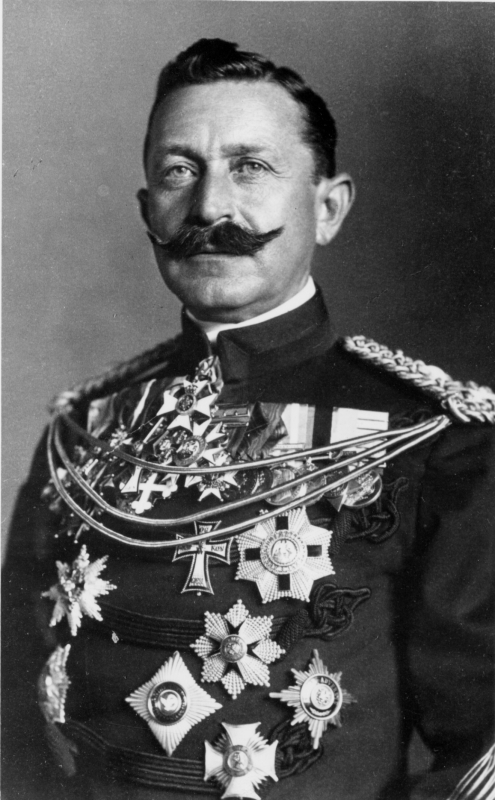
Rudolf Slatin, 1910

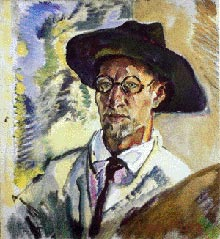
Leo Putz, self portrait, 1914

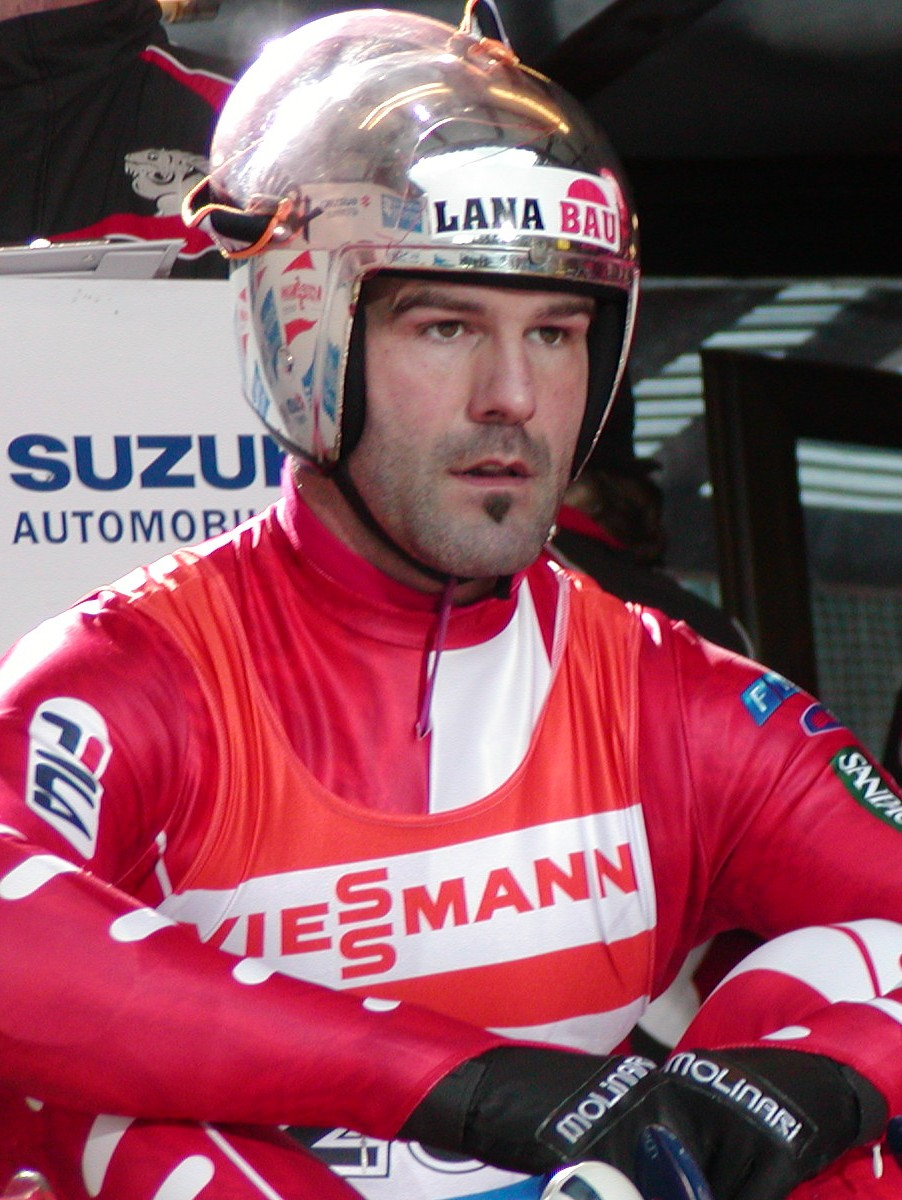
Armin Zöggeler, 2005

=== Early times ===
- Arbeo of Freising (died 784), early medieval author and bishop
- Johann Baptista Ruffini (1672–1749), salt trader

=== 19th century ===
- Pius Zingerle (1801–1881), an Austrian Orientalist
- Ludwig Freiherr von und zu der Tann-Rathsamhausen (1815–1881 in Meran), a Bavarian general
- Oskar Freiherr von Redwitz (1823–1891), a German poet, lived in Merano from 1872
- Ignaz Vincenz Zingerle (1825–1892), poet and scholar
- Peretz Smolenskin (1842–1885 in Meran), a Russian-born Zionist and Hebrew writer
- Hermann von Tappeiner (1847–1927), physician and pharmacologist, used photodynamic therapy
- Sir Rudolf Carl von Slatin (1857–1932), soldier and Inspector General of Sudan
- Ferdinand Behrens (1862–1925), painter and city portraitist
- Leo Putz (1869–1940), Tyrolean painter
- Prince Emmanuel, Duke of Vendome (1872–1931), a French royal from the House of Orléans
- Prince Francis Joseph of Braganza (1879–1919), officer in the Austro-Hungarian Army and victim of sex scandals and swindles
- Richard Steidle (1881–1940 in Buchenwald), lawyer, leader of the paramilitary Heimwehr in Tyrol
- Erna Ellmenreich (1885–1976), operatic soprano, a member of the Staatstheater Stuttgart
- Oswald Menghin (1888–1973), university professor, prehistorians, minister of education
- Heinz von Perckhammer (1895–1965), photographer, known for his Chinese nudes
- Ludwig Bemelmans (1898–1962), American writer and illustrator of children's books

=== 20th century ===
- Hans Andersag (1902–1955), scientist, discovered Chloroquine, a malaria drug
- Anton Malloth (1912–2002), supervisor at Theresienstadt concentration camp
- Silvius Magnago (1914–2010), politician, South Tyrolean governor, father of the autonomy of South Tyrol
- Annelies Reinhold (1917–2007), film actress
- Bargil Pixner (1921–2002), a Benedictine monk, Biblical scholar and archaeologist
- Norbert Untersteiner (1926–2012), pioneer of modern polar science research
- Alberto Lizzio (1926–1999), fictitious conductor of inexpensive, mass market, classical recordings
- Irène Galter (1931–2018), actress
- Maria Bertolini (1931–2022), politician
- Arnaldo Di Benedetto (born 1940), literary critic and professor
- Franco D'Andrea (born 1941), jazz pianist
- Lino Capolicchio (1943–2022), actor, screenwriter and film director
- Cuno Tarfusser (born 1954), judge at the International Criminal Court
- Gloria Guida (born 1955), Italian-speaking actress
- Rudolf Stingel (born 1956), artist
- Ferdinand Gamper (1957–1996), serial killer
- Luca Dipierro (born 1973), animator and writer

=== Sport ===
- Norberto Oberburger (born 1960), retired heavyweight weightlifter, gold medallist at the 1984 Summer Olympics
- Edith Gufler (born 1962), former sport shooter, silver medallist at the 1984 Summer Olympics
- Günther Steiner (born 1965), motorsports engineer and former team principal of Haas F1 Team
- Armin Zöggeler (born 1974), luge champion with six Olympic medals and nine world championship golds
- Dominik Paris (born 1989), alpine skier, gold and silver medallist in World Championships
- Daniel Frank (born 1994), ice hockey player
- Daniel Grassl (born 2002), figure skater at the 2022 Winter Olympics, silver medalist at the 2022 European Figure Skating Championships

== Economy ==
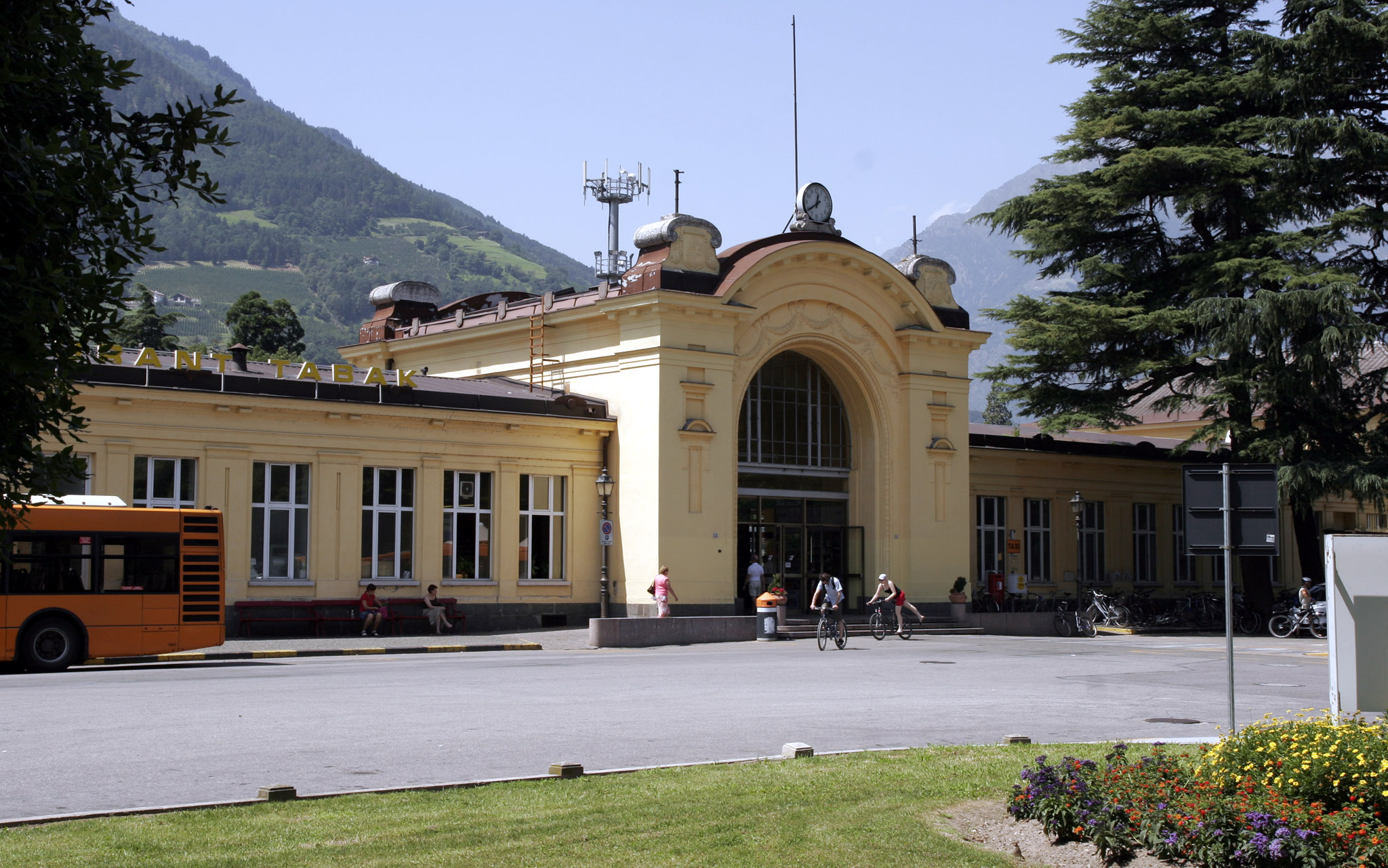
Merano railway station

Merano is a popular tourist destination especially for Germans and Italians. In the summer, there are concerts on the promenade almost daily, and there are fine walks around the city and in the surrounding hills, not least "Meran/o 2000", where there is also skiing in winter. The city is reachable with the railway Bolzano-Merano, which continues to the Vinschgau Railway Merano-Malles.

== Society ==
According to the 2024 census, 51.37% of the resident population spoke Italian as first language, 48.26% German, and 0.37% Ladin.

== Sport ==
A chess opening, the Meran Variation of the Semi-Slav Defense, is named after the city, from its successful use by Akiba Rubinstein against Ernst Grünfeld during a tournament held in the city in 1924. In 1981, the World Chess Championship match between Anatoly Karpov and Viktor Korchnoi was held in Merano. The first act of the musical Chess also has a world chess championship match set in Merano, and features a song entitled "Merano", which includes the line, "rosy-cheeked Merano, flourishing to a fault".

The city's handball team, Sport Club Meran Handball, is one of the most successful in Italy, winning the scudetto in 2005. The ice hockey team won two national championships but currently plays in the second division, Serie B.

Each September, the Gran Premio Merano takes place in the Maia Racecourse; this is the most famous Italian Steeplechase.

Merano hosted the 1953, 1971 and 1983 ICF Canoe Slalom World Championships. This is where the well known 'Merano' move was created due to a tricky upstream gate. This move is now used and well known by many slalom paddlers worldwide.

== Twin towns and sister cities ==
The twin towns and sister cities are:

- Salzburg, Austria

== See also ==
- Merano Tramway
- Merano derailment
