= Pius Zingerle =

Austrian scholar and Orientalist

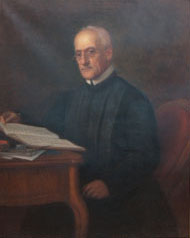
- Born: 17 March 1801; Meran
- Died: 10 January 1881 (aged 79); Marienberg, Meran
- Education: Innsbruck
- Known for: Syriac translations
- Scientific career
- Fields: Oriental languages
- Workplaces: Abbey of Marienberg, Sapienza, Vatican Library

Pius Zingerle (17 March 1801 – 10 January 1881) was an Austrian Orientalist.

== Life ==
Zingerle was born at Meran, Tyrol. After studying the humanities at Meran, philosophy and two years of theology at Innsbruck, he joined the Benedictines at Marienberg in 1820, took vows, 20 October 1822, and was ordained priest, 4 April 1824. With the exception of six years (1824-7 and 1837-9) during which he was assistant pastor at Platt and at St. Martin, two parishes in the Valley of Passeier, he was professor, since 1852 also director at the gymnasium of Meran. Upon the invitation of Pius IX, he became professor of Semitic languages at the Sapienza in Rome in March, 1862. While in Rome he was also consultor of the Propaganda for Oriental Affairs and scriptor of the Vatican Library.

Unable to accustom himself to the Roman climate, he returned to Marienberg in 1865, where he was made sub-prior and professor of theology. He had a fair knowledge of Hebrew, Arabic, and Persian, was an acknowledged master of Syriac, and gained considerable fame through his German versions of the writings of Saint Ephraem.

Zingerle died at the Abbey of Marienberg near Meran, 10 January 1881.

== Works ==
The following are his chief works:

- Echte Akten heiliger Märtyrer des Morgenlandes, translated from the Syriac (2 vols., Innsbruck, 1836)
- Ausgewählte Schriften des heiligen Ephräm, translated from the Greek and the Syriac (6 vols., Innsbruck, 1837; new ed., Augsburg, 1845-of which vols. IV and V are German martial versions of Ephraem's Syriac hymns)
- Ephräm's Reden wider die Ketzer, in vol. XXVIII of Sämtliche Werke der heil. Väter (Kempten, 1859)
- Harfenklänge vom Libanon (Innsbruck, 1840)
- Festkränze aus Libanon's Gärten (Dillingen, 1846)
- Marien-Rosen aus Damaskus (Innsbruck, 1853; 2nd ed., Augsburg, 1955)
- Leben und Wirken des heil. Simeon Stylites (Innsbruck, 1855)
- Monumenta Syriaca ex romanis codd. collecta (Innsbruck, 1869)
- Chrestomathia Syriaca cum indice vocabularum (Rome, 1871)
- Lexicon Syriacum in usum Chrestomathiae (Rome, 1873).

He contributed various essays on the Ephraemic metre and on the Syrian metre in general to Zeitschrift der deutschen morgenländischen Gesellschaft, vols. II-XIX, and other Syrian studies to Tübinger Theologische Quartalschrift in the years 1853 and 1870-71. He is also the author of two volumes of German poems (vol. I, Innsbruck, 1843; vol. II, Mainz, 1860) and of a few ascetical and other works of minor importance.
