= Passer (river) =

River in Italy

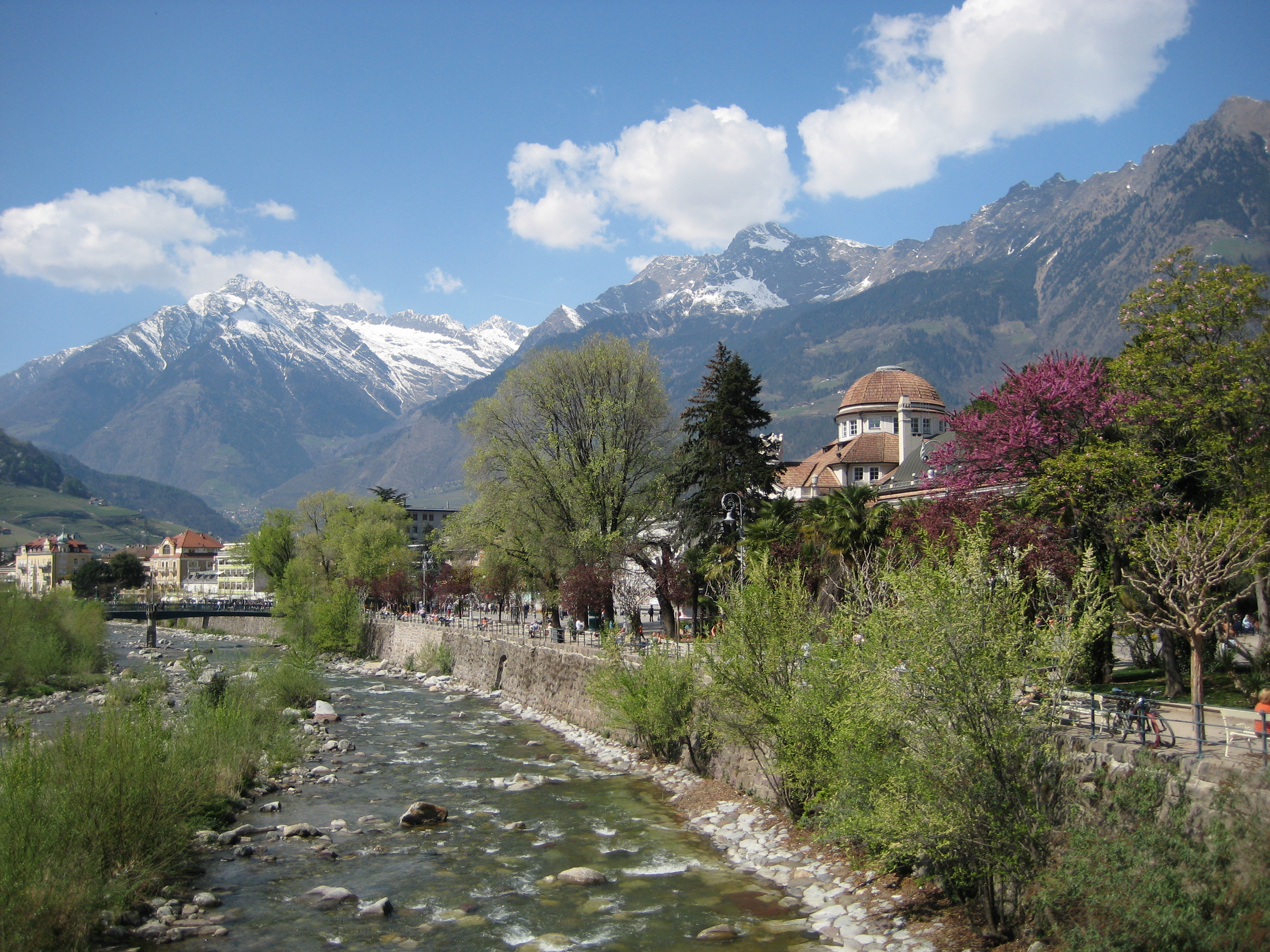
- The Passer in Merano

Location
- Country: Italy

Physical characteristics
- Source
  - location: Timmelsjoch
  - elevation: 3,479 m (11,414 ft)
- Mouth: Adige
  - location: Merano
  - coordinates: 46.6632°N 11.1436°E
  - elevation: 294 m (965 ft)
- Length: 42.6 km (26.5 mi)
- Basin size: 427 km^{2} (165 sq mi)

Basin features
- Progression: Adige→ Adriatic Sea

The Passer (German pronunciation: [pasɐ]; Italian: Passirio [pasˈsiːrjo]) is a 42.6-kilometre (26.5 mi) torrent in northern Italy, a left tributary of the Adige, whose entire course lies within South Tyrol. The stream rises near the Alpine pass between Italy and Austria known as the Timmelsjoch, and flows through the Passeier Valley where the most important settlement is St. Leonhard in Passeier. The river joins the Adige at Merano, where it is a significant site for competitive canoeing, beneath the Steinerner Steg.
