= Oswald von Wolkenstein =

German poet, composer and diplomat

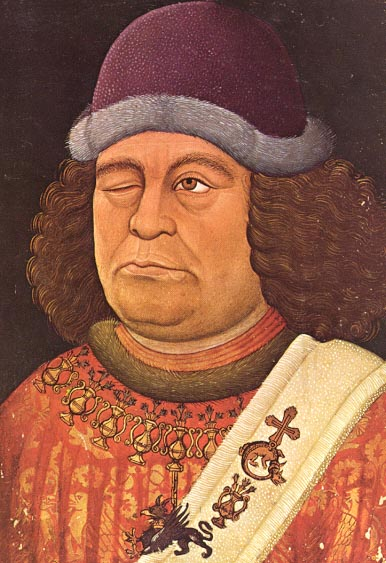
- Oswald von Wolkenstein - Portrait from the Innsbrucker Handschrift, 1432
- Born: 1376 or 1377; Pfalzen
- Died: August 2, 1445; Meran

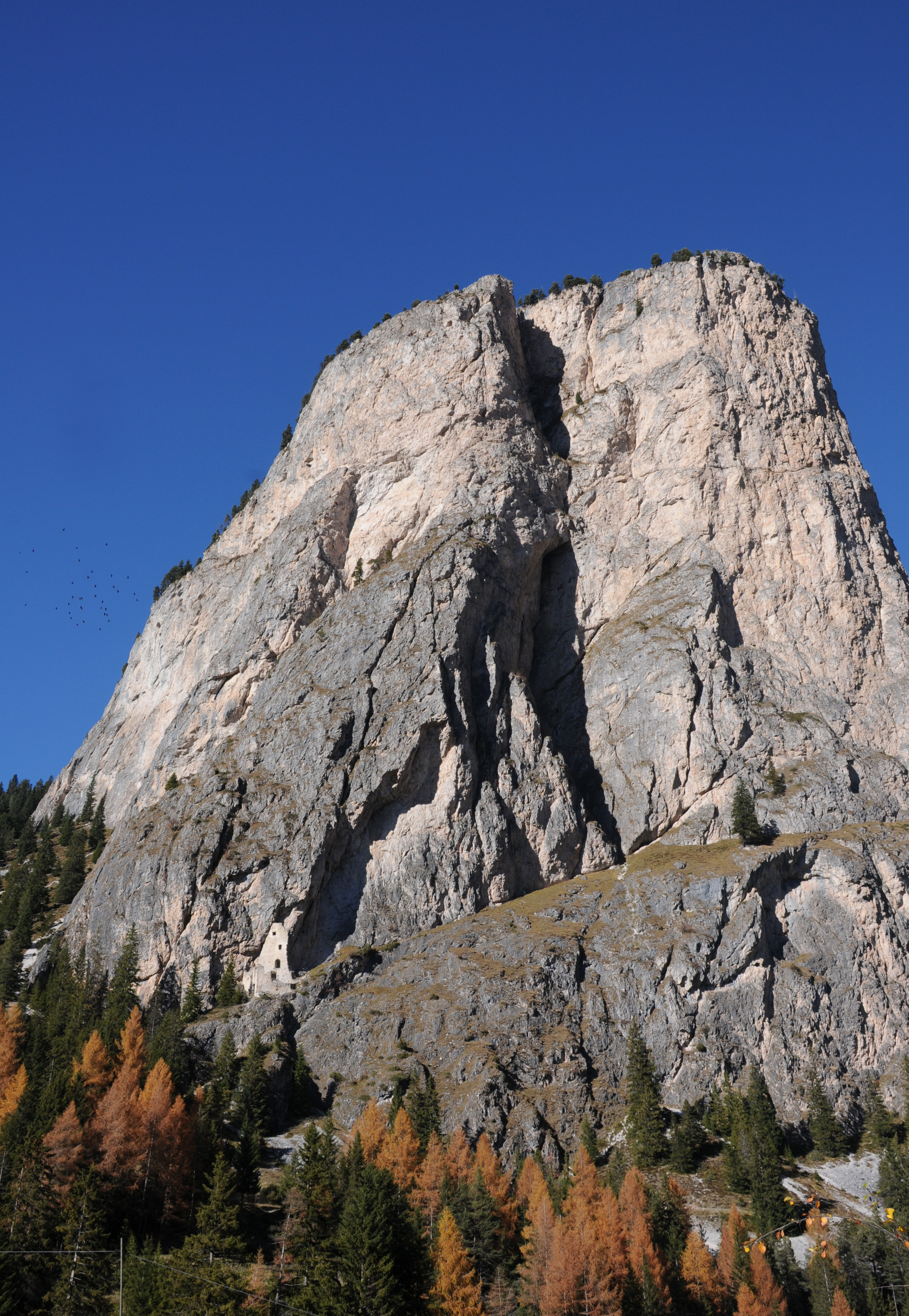
Stevia Mountain with the ruins of Wolkenstein castle - the ancestral castle of the Wolkenstein family

Oswald von Wolkenstein (1376 or 1377 in Pfalzen – August 2, 1445, in Meran) was a poet, composer and diplomat. In his diplomatic capacity, he traveled through much of Europe to as far as Georgia (as recounted in "Durch Barbarei, Arabia").

He was dubbed a Knight of the Holy Sepulchre and was also inducted into the Order of the Jar and the Order of the Dragon. He lived for a time in Seis am Schlern.

== Life ==
Oswald's father was Friedrich von Wolkenstein and his mother was Katharina von Villanders. When he was ten years old, Oswald left his family and became a squire of a knight errant. Oswald described the journeys undertaken by him in the following 14 years in his autobiographical song "Es fügt sich...". He mentioned his travels to Crete, Prussia, Lithuania, Crimea, Turkey, the Holy Land, France, Lombardy (i.e. what is known today as Northern Italy) and Spain, as well as being shipwrecked in the Black Sea.

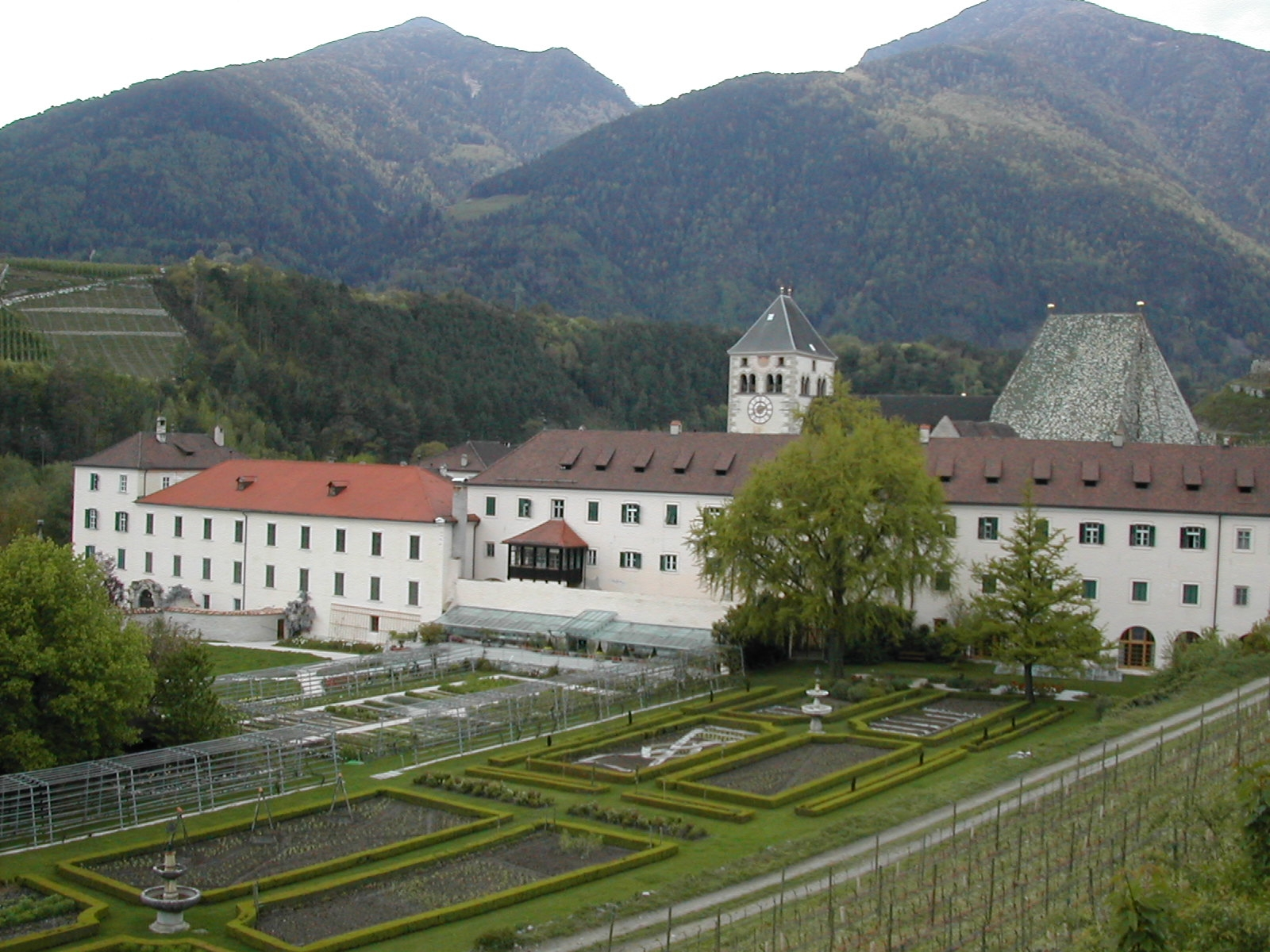
Neustift Monastery

After the death of his father in 1399, Oswald returned to the County of Tyrol and began a quarrel with his older brother Michael about their inheritance. From 1401 to 1402, Oswald participated in the failed Italian expedition of King Rupert of Germany. In 1407 he and his brother agreed on how to split the inheritance: Oswald received a third of Castle Hauenstein and the accompanying estates in Seis am Schlern. The other two-thirds of the castle belonged to a knight named Martin Jäger, but Oswald did not respect the property situation, occupying the entire castle and appropriating Jäger's share of the tithe. In 1408, in preparation for a pilgrimage to the Holy Land, Oswald paid for a memorial stone to be installed on the wall of the cathedral in Brixen. The stone has survived and shows him in the garb of a Crusader, with the long beard associated with pilgrims. Before he left, he wrote several songs for his beloved, Anna Hausmann, the wife of the Brixner burgher Hans Hausmann. After his return in 1410, he acquired the right to take up residence in Neustift Monastery, an Augustiner-Chorherren cloister near Brixen.

In 1414 Oswald became a member of the entourage of Friedrich IV, Duke of Austria and Count of Tyrol, at the Council of Constance (1414–18); a portrait of Oswald can be found in the council's chronicle (by Ulrich von Richental). Oswald entered as a diplomat in the service of Sigismund, Holy Roman Emperor and King of Hungary. His first diplomatic voyage brought him to England, Scotland and Portugal, where he participated in the conquest of the Moorish city of Ceuta. In 1416 he joined King Sigismund in France and they traveled together back to Constance. In 1417 Oswald married Margarete von Schwangau, with whom he would have seven children. Later that year he returned to Tyrol, where he joined the Elefantenbund, an alliance of noblemen against Friedrich IV, who had been banned by King Sigismund for aiding the flight of Antipope John XXIII from the Council of Constance. With the help of the local population, especially the peasants, Friedrich was able to resist the King and the nobles and from 1418 onwards Friedrich pursued his enemies within Tyrol vigorously. In September 1421 Oswald was lured by his lover Anna Hausmann into a trap and apprehended by Martin Jäger, who brought Oswald to Innsbruck and handed him over to Count Friedrich. In March 1422 Friedrich, in exchange for a surety of 6,000 ducats and an oath to abjure all vengeance, released Oswald for five months so that Oswald could settle his debts with Martin Jäger and other nobles. Oswald could not reach an agreement with his enemies and did not show up in Tirol Castle on August 24, 1422, opting rather to ride to Hungary, where he met King Sigismund. Together they plotted a war against Friedrich. The war was started by Oswald's brother Michael who wrote to Friedrich on September 5, 1422: "Therefore I want to be your enemy and be in an alliance with your enemies."

In 1423 open hostilities culminated in the siege of Castle Greifenstein, during which Oswald with both his brothers was part of the castle's garrison. The siege was lifted in November 1423 through a successful sally. However, because the burghers and peasants of Tyrol and the bishop of Brixen supported Count Friedrich, most of the nobles, including both brothers of Oswald, surrendered on December 17, 1423. Few nobles chose to continue to fight. The most prominent were Hans von Villanders, the brothers Ulrich and Wilhelm von Starkenberg, who successfully defended Castle Greifenstein for years to come, and Oswald, who was the last to surrender.

In 1424 things calmed down and Oswald commissioned the Neustift Monastery to create a manuscript of his songs. The calmness of the year was due to the new Binger Kurverein (Alliance of Bingen) by the Empire's Kurfürsten against Sigmund, who could not afford to fight three wars at once: the planned one against Friedrich, the brewing one against the Kurverein and the ongoing one against the Hussites. On February 17, 1425, King and Count made peace at Castle Hornstein; Oswald was present.

Oswald returned to Tyrol to find himself completely penniless. Count Friedrich insisted on the payment of the 6,000 ducat surety. Oswald tried in vain to get hold of the money and fled Tyrol. In 1425 he resided in Castle Neuhaus near Gais, which at this point was not yet part of the County of Tyrol, but part of the County of Görz. Friedrich immediately used the peace with King Sigismund to renew the siege of Castle Greifenstein.

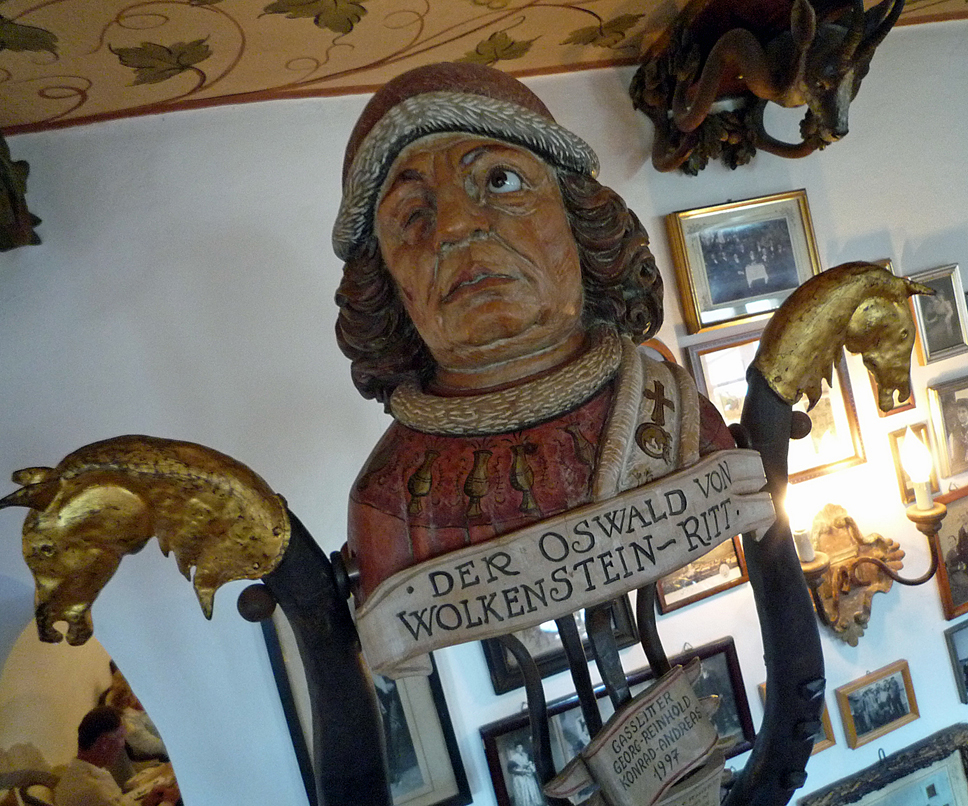
Statue of Oswald von Wolkenstein

After Wilhelm von Starkenberg's capitulation on November 26, 1426, Oswald was the last nobleman feuding with Count Friedrich, and was summoned to the Landtag in Bolzano. Oswald again fled Tyrol, but his flight was discovered. He was apprehended near Wasserburg on Lake Constance, brought back to Tyrol, and imprisoned in Castle Vellenberg (later Castle Sonnenburg) in Innsbruck. Oswald now had no choice but to make peace with Count Friedrich, who forced him to pay Martin Jäger a compensation in exchange for the stolen tithes, and in the process allowed Oswald to acquire full ownership of Castle Hauenstein and its estates. Furthermore, Oswald had to swear to refrain from any contact with nobles from outside Tyrol unless sanctioned by Count Friedrich.

In 1428, Oswald broke his oath and traveled to Heidelberg to meet Kurfürst Ludwig von der Pfalz, Archbishop of Cologne, Count Dietrich II von Moers and Duke Adolf VII von Jülich, with the aim to garner the help of the League of the Holy Court in a dispute with his cousin Hans von Villanders, who owed Oswald 2,200 ducats. While there, Oswald entered into a fray between the Domkapitel of Brixen and the new Prince-Bishop of Brixen, Ulrich Putsch (died 1437), who was a friend of Martin Jäger, a confidante of Count Friedrich, and soon-to-be bishop chancellor of the County of Tyrol. The clash culminated in a coup on October 30, 1429, supported by Friedrich and led by Oswald against the bishop, who while being a prisoner of Oswald was beaten publicly by him. Initially, King Sigismund backed Oswald, but when informed by the other side in the dispute, both Sigismund and Friedrich switched sides and reinstated bishop Ulrich.

In 1430 King Sigismund summoned the nobles of the Holy Roman Empire to a Reichstag in the city of Nuremberg and Oswald with his brother Michael immediately left Tyrol to meet the King, who instead of going directly to Nuremberg undertook a two-month detour to the South German cities of Überlingen and Constance to celebrate Christmas. During this period, Oswald wrote many songs of an erotic nature, the most famous being "Ain Graserin" (KL 76) about a bathing maid, whose "frizzy hair" between her legs leads a man to have sex with her on the spot. In Nuremberg, Oswald became a member of the first rank of the Order of the Dragon, a rank King Sigismund awarded only to two dozen nobles. Along with the honor came the obligation to participate in Sigismund's disastrous expedition against the Hussites in Bohemia in 1431. Oswald experienced firsthand the mass flight of the 130,000-strong Imperial army on August 14, 1431, when the entire army panicked after sighting the 50,000-strong Hussite army approaching and singing.

Sigismund sent Oswald back to Tyrol to prepare the county for an expected Hussite invasion of the Empire and invited the Hussites to the Council of Basel to negotiate. Sigismund himself fled to Milan and later to Piacenza under the pretext that he had to go to Rome to be crowned emperor. During this time Oswald commissioned the Neustift Monastery to create a second manuscript collection of his songs. Sigismund called him to join him in Piacenza and Oswald obliged. The unpleasantness of his visit inspired him to write the complaint-song "Wer die ougen vil verschüren", which he set to a French melody. In May of the same year, Oswald was sent by Sigismund to Basel. After over a year of negotiations, Sigismund was crowned Holy Roman Emperor on May 31, 1433, by Pope Eugenius IV, with Oswald probably in attendance.

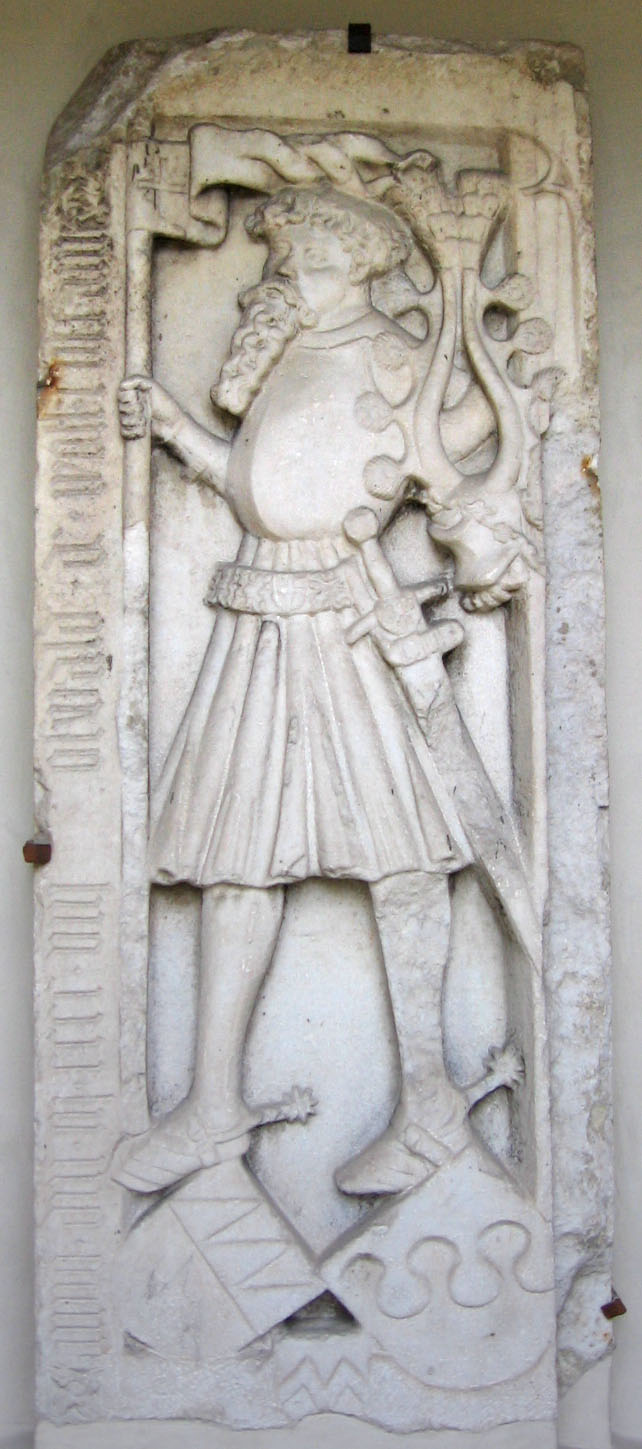
Oswald's memorial stone on the wall of the cathedral in Brixen

During the next years, Oswald's life settled down, and almost no reports of fights, brawls or trials are preserved. This changed with the death of Count Friedrich on June 24, 1439. As the heir Sigismund was only twelve years old at the time, a guardian had to be found until Sigismund came of age. The Landstände of Tyrol choose Sigismund's uncle Friedrich V, Duke of Austria. The contracts of the guardianship were put in Oswald's care. Oswald used the opportunity to seek the assistance of Friedrich V in his eighteen-year-long legal wrangling with Hans von Villanders over bonds Oswald had given his cousin to hold.

When the guardianship of Sigismund ended on July 25, 1443, and Friedrich, now King Friedrich III of the Holy Roman Empire, decided to prolong it for another six years, the Landstände of Tyrol organized an open revolt. Oswald became one of five military commanders and was tasked with the defense of the most important of all positions, the Mühlbacher Klause (Mühlbach fortress), which blocked the most likely invasion route from Styria, where King Friedrich had taken up residence. The cities of Merano and Bolzano provided funds and troops to reinforce the fortress, and all other passes and entrances into Tyrol were blocked by troops. As the city of Trento backed the King, an army of 3,000 men was sent south to besiege the city. On December 10, a Tyrolean delegation arrived in Graz to demand the release of Sigismund and the return of the county's treasures, taken by Friedrich in 1440. Friedrich refused and threatened war. The Tyroleans responded by sacking Trento and electing Johann Röttel as the new bishop on January 4, 1440. Röttel's first declaration was to fully support the Landstände against the King. Oswald was one of the electors and the main instigator of this election. The next session by the Landstände began in Merano on May 16, 1445, and as it was now clear that King Friedrich was not planning an attack, options were discussed on how to bring Sigismund to Tyrol. Oswald died on August 2, 1445, in Merano, succumbing to an intense heatwave. His offices were taken over by Ulrich von Matsch. His body was brought to Neustift Monastery in Vahrn and buried near the font in the monastery's church, where his grave was rediscovered in 1973.

== Oswald's right eye ==
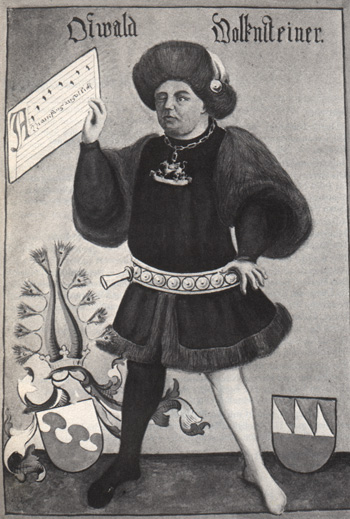
A depiction of Oswald, with his closed eye visible

All extant portraits of Oswald depict him with a closed right eye. An examination of his skull from a 1973 exhumation revealed that this was due to a congenital defect: his right eye socket was smaller than the left, which meant that his right eyeball was under constant pressure, resulting in ptosis, or a withering of the right eyelid muscles. However, Franz Daxecker concludes that the ptosis was probably caused by an injury sustained in childhood. Dieter Kühn's biography of Oswald, which attributes the "loss" of the right eye to an archery mishap when the boy was eight years old, is now generally discredited. A popular theory that the eye was lost during the siege of Greifenstein Castle in 1423 is also implausible, as portraits of Oswald from 1408 already depict him with a drooping eyelid.

== Distinctions ==
- Knight of the Holy Sepulchre
- Order of the Jar
- Order of the Dragon

== Compositions ==
He is one of the most important German composers of the Middle Ages. There are three main topics of his work: travel, God and sex. Oswald's poems are preserved in three manuscripts:

- MS A (Vienna), 42 songs completed in 1425, with an addition of another 66 poems from 1427 to 1436.
- MS B (Innsbruck): 1432
- MS C (Innsbruck-Trostburg): 1450, a copy of B.

MSs A and B were completed under the supervision of Oswald himself, and both contain a depiction of the author, qualifying as one of the earliest authentic depictions of a German author.

=== Editions ===
- [MS A] Oswald von Wolkenstein. Die Gedichte, ed. J. Schatz. 2nd ed. Göttingen 1904.
- [MS B] Die Lieder Oswalds von Wolkenstein, ed. K. K. Klein. 3rd ed. H. Moser, N. R. Wolf, N. Wolf, Tübingen 1987.
- [MS C] Die Gedichte Oswalds von Wolkenstein. Mit Einleitung, Wortbuch und Varianten, ed. B. Weber, Innsbruck 1847.
- Classen, Albrecht: The Poems of Oswald Von Wolkenstein: An English Translation of the Complete Works. (1376/77-1445) The New Middle Ages. Palgrave 2008, ISBN 978-0-230-60985-3

== See also ==
- List of Austrian writers

== Sources ==
This article is based on the 600-page biography Ich Wolkenstein by Dieter Kühn; Insel Taschenbuch 497; Erweiterte Ausgabe 1980; Insel Verlag Frankfurt am Main 1977; ISBN 3-458-32197-7.
