= Coloman of Stockerau =

Irish saint (died 1012)

Saint Coloman of Stockerau
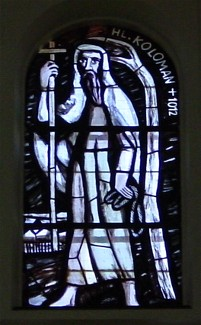
- Window of St. Coloman in the church of Melk Abbey
- Born: 10th century Ireland
- Died: October 18, 1012; Stockerau
- Venerated in: Roman Catholic Church, Eastern Orthodox Church
- Major shrine: Abbey of Melk
- Feast: October 13
- Attributes: pilgrim's hat and dress, rope in his hand; hanging on a gibbet; tongs and rod; book and maniple
- Patronage: Austria; Melk; patron of hanged men, horned cattle, and horses; invoked against plague and for husbands by marriageable girls; invoked against hanging; invoked against gout; patron of innocents persecuted as spies.

Coloman of Stockerau (Irish: Colmán; Latin: Colomannus; died 18 October 1012) was an Irish saint. While on pilgrimage to the Holy Land, he was mistaken for a spy and hanged near Vienna.

== Life ==
Originally known as Colmán (variously rendered Koloman, Kálmán, Colman, and Colomannus), he was an Irish pilgrim en route to the Holy Land and was mistaken for a spy because of his strange appearance. He was tortured and hanged at Stockerau, near Vienna, Austria, on 16 July 1012. Later tradition has it that he was "a son of Máel-Sechnaill (d. 1022), high king of Ireland." (Breen, 2009)

At the time of his death, there were continual skirmishes among Austria, Moravia, and Bohemia. Coloman spoke no German, so he could not give an understandable account of himself. He was hanged alongside several robbers.

According to Aidan Breen, "He was made a saint by the local people, possibly out of remorse for the deed and because of his endurance under torture and the many miracles reported from where his body was buried." (Breen, 2009)

== Veneration ==
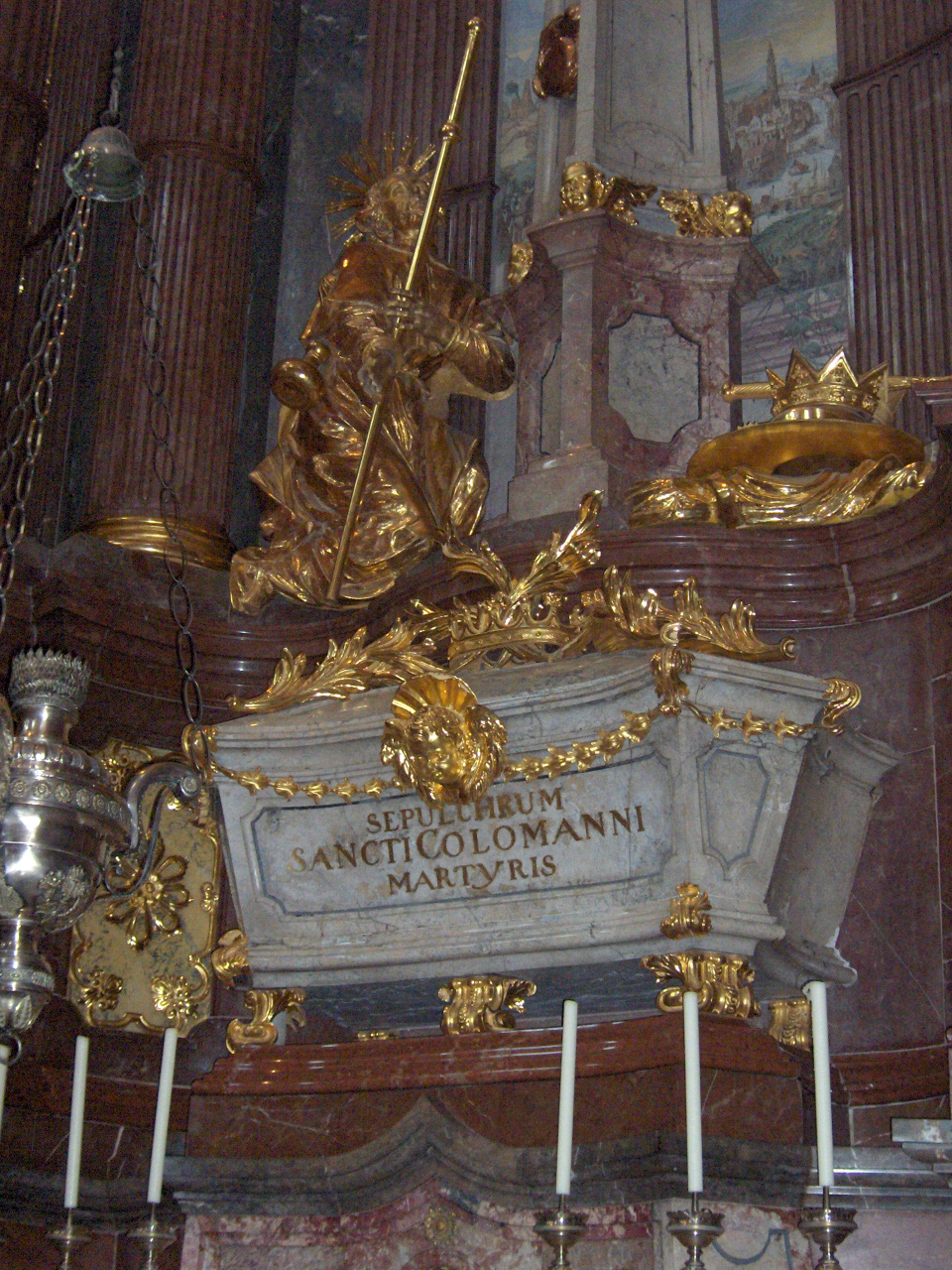
Sarcophagus of Coloman. Melk Abbey, Austria.

On 13 October 1014, his relics were transferred to the Abbey of Melk by Bishop Megingard at the request of Marquis Henry of Austria. Decades later, they were taken to Hungary. Coleman became the object of a popular cult, and many churches and chapels in Austria, the Electorate of the Palatinate, Hungary, and Bavaria were dedicated to him. He is also venerated in Ireland.

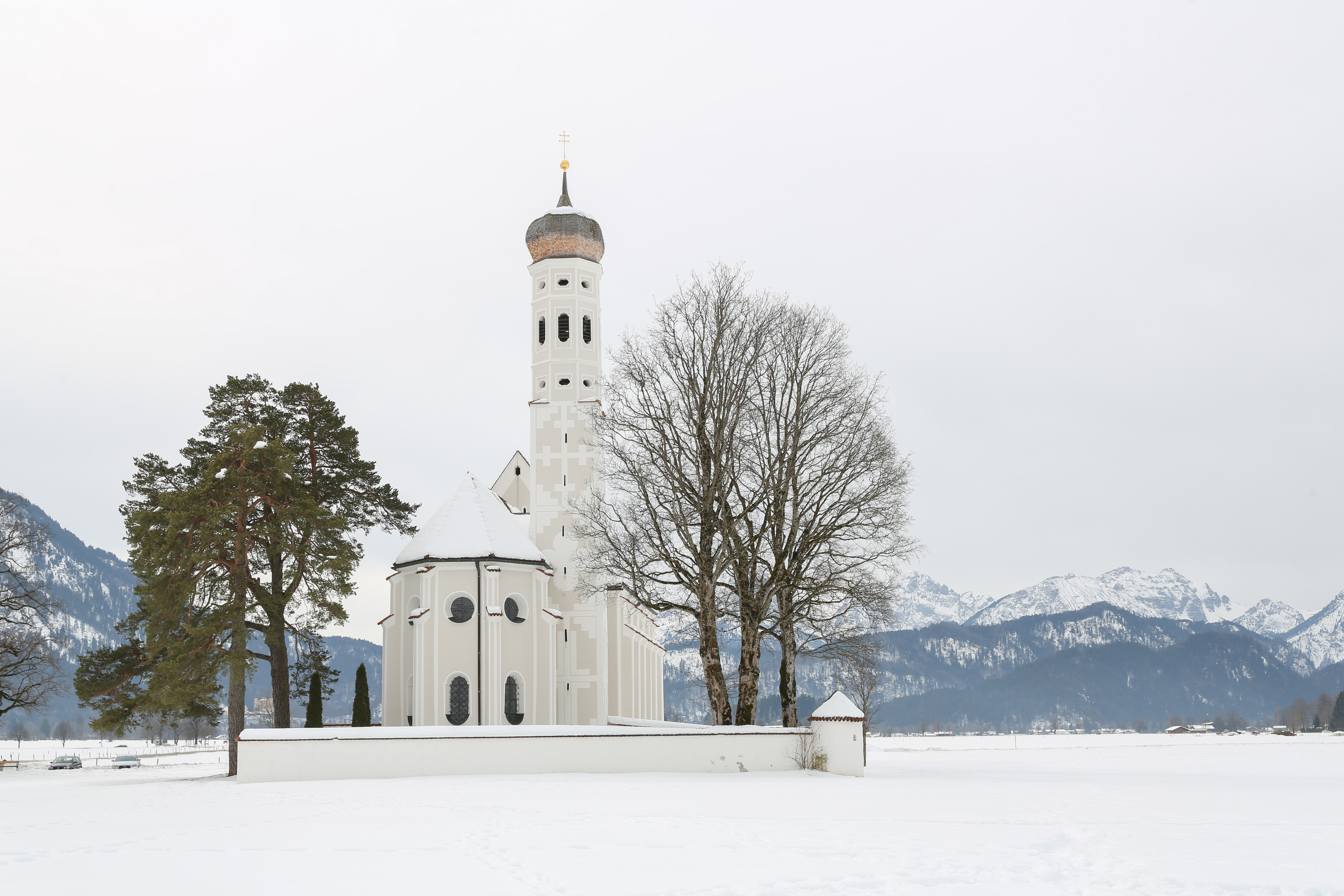
The church of St. Coloman, Schwangau.

A legend states that Coloman's body remained incorruptible for eighteen months, remaining undisturbed by birds and beasts. The scaffolding itself is said to have taken root and to have blossomed with green branches, one of which is preserved under the high altar of the Franciscan church at Stockerau.

Géza I of Hungary named one of his sons, King Coloman of Hungary, in his honor. In the 13th century, the younger brother of King Bela IV of Hungary was named Coloman of Galicia-Lodomeria in honor of Coloman.

Eventually, the relics of Coloman were taken back from the Cathedral of Székesfehérvár to Melk Abbey in Austria, where they are still kept. Many Austrian rulers made modifications to the tomb of Coloman, and the actual reliquary was made in the Baroque style.

== See also ==
- Incorruptibles

== Sources ==
"Coleman", by Aidan Breen, Dictionary of Irish Biography, page 696, volume two, 2009.
