= Lake Varna (Italy) =

Alpine lake in South Tyrol, Italy

Lake Varna Vahrner See
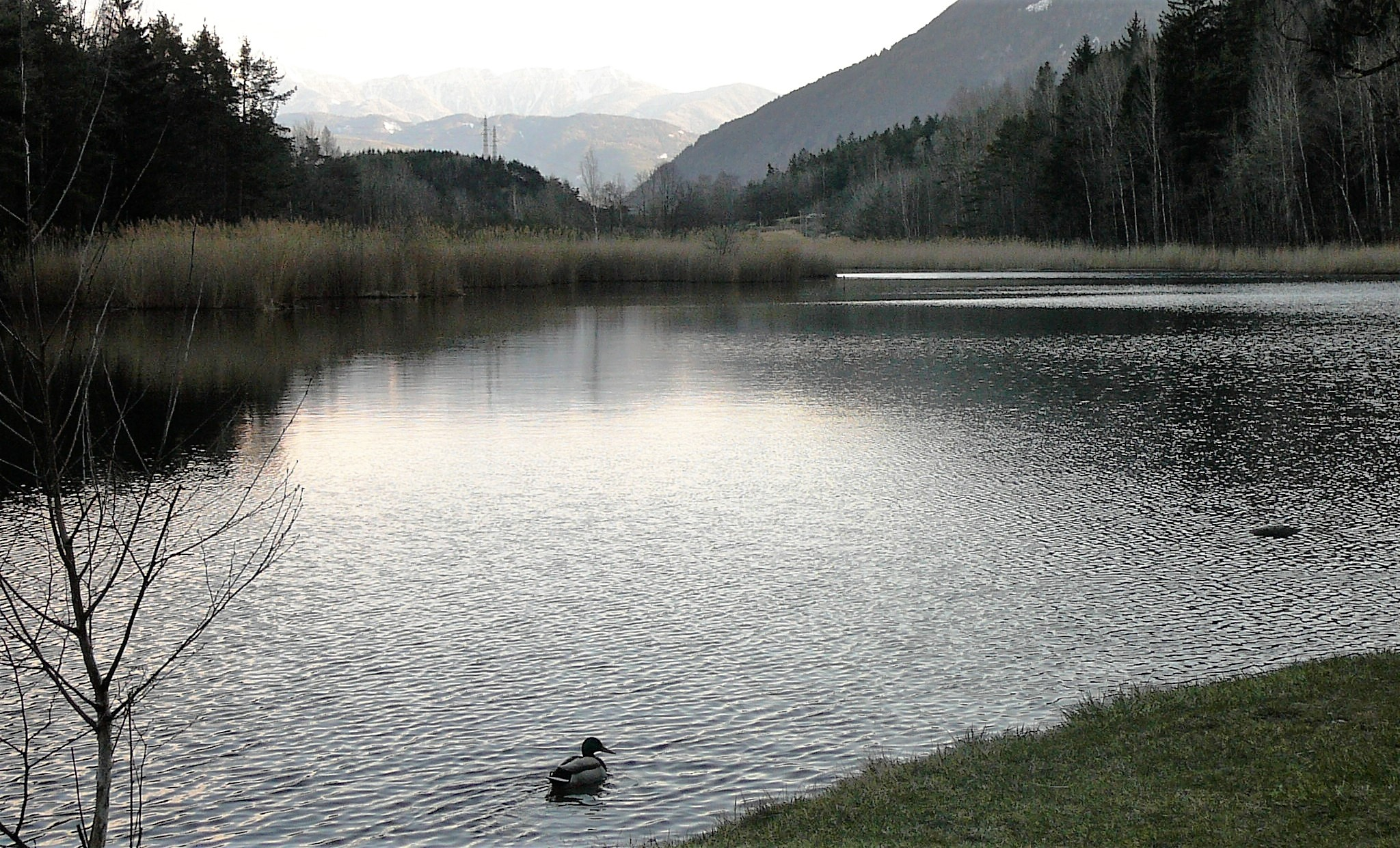
- View of the lake
- Interactive map of Lake Varna; Vahrner See
- Location: Vahrn, South Tyrol, Trentino-Alto Adige, Italy
- Coordinates: 46.765945°N 11.635958°E
- Type: Alpine
- Primary inflows: Minor streams
- Basin countries: Italy
- Surface area: 1.5 ha (3.7 acres)
- Average depth: 3.5 m (11 ft)
- Surface elevation: 712 m (2,336 ft)

The Lake Varna (Vahrner See in German) is a small alpine lake located in the Eisack Valley at 712 m above sea level, about two kilometers north of the municipality of Vahrn, in the Province of Bolzano, near Brixen.

== History ==
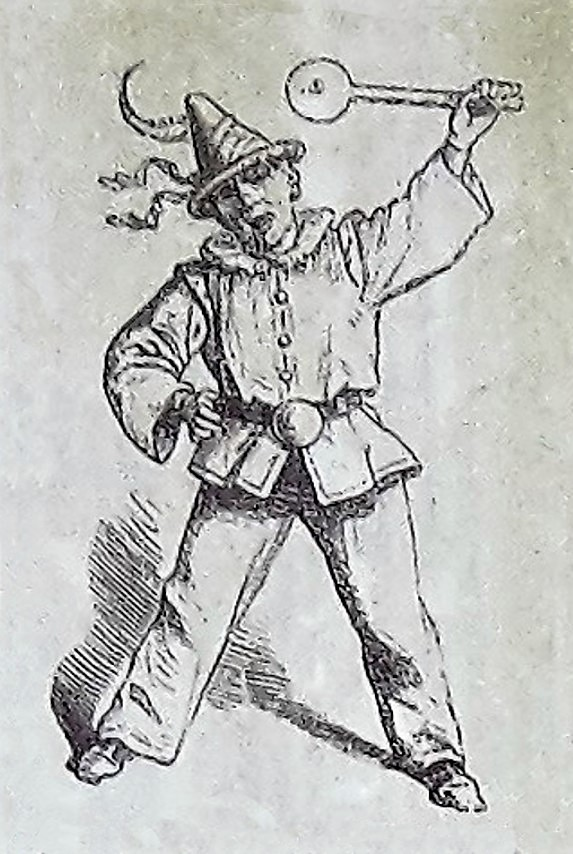
Ernst Fröhlich (1810–1882)

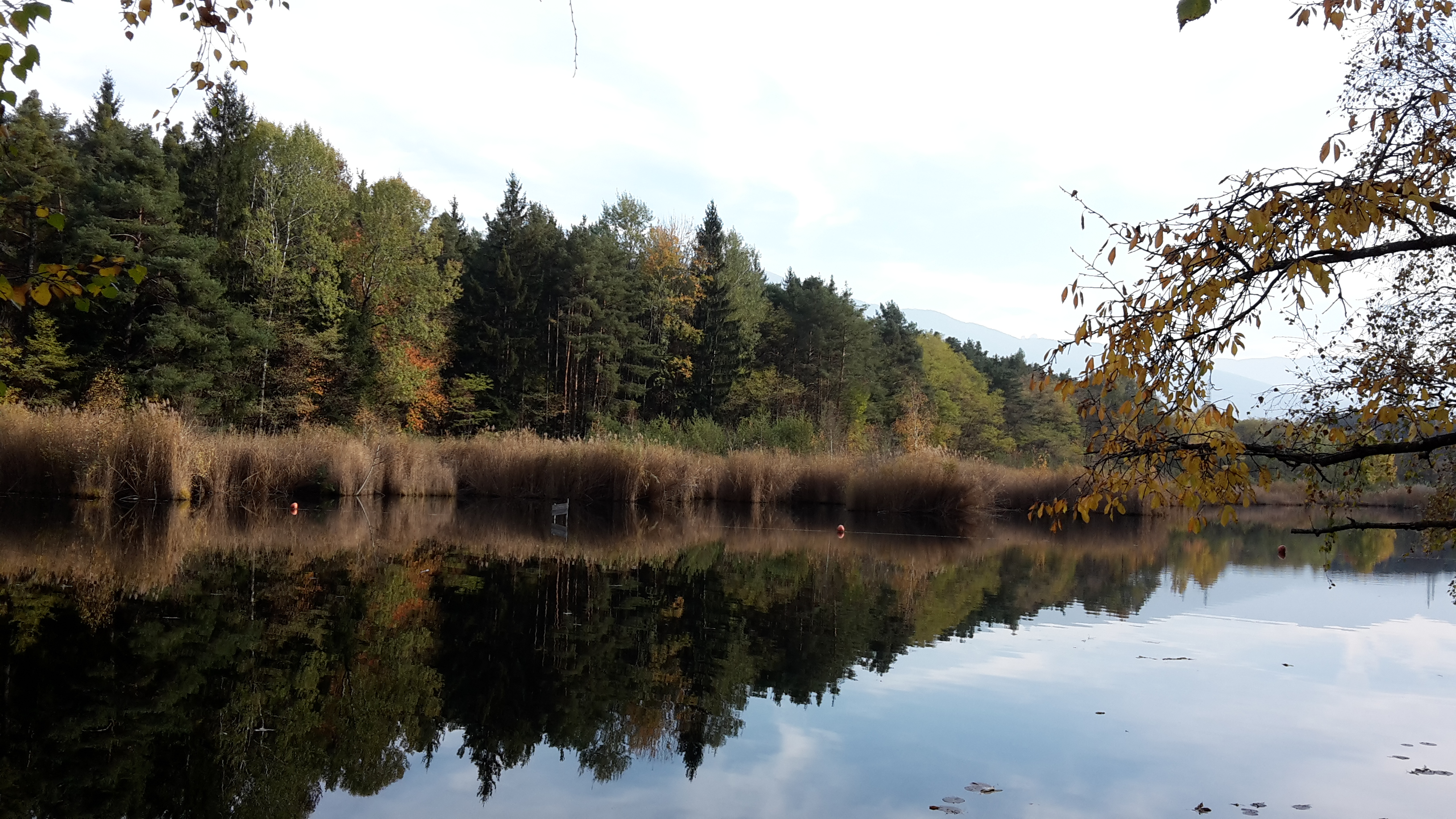
Lake Varna

In addition to this lake, further downstream there was a second small lake called "Lower Varna Lake". But this was drained and reclaimed in 1825 to obtain agricultural land. In memory of the original lake, the Eisack Valley anglers' association, between 1995 and 1998, recreated an artificial lake for sport fishing in the same location as the original, naming it Untersee.

Following the construction of the Fortezza Fortress in Varna, a small barracks for military personnel training was built in 1840, along with an attached shooting range constructed on the right bank of the lake. From here, it was possible to shoot up to the opposite bank, with distances ranging from 50 to 250 meters, almost entirely concealed in their trenches. Moving targets were also provided to simulate enemy movements, sometimes dressed as harlequins, such as the figure of Ernst Fröhlich, one of the target control operators. These operators mocked the shooters if they missed the target center, while they rejoiced when the actual target was hit.

The shooting range itself remained active until the 1960s, when it was closed for safety reasons.

In September 2017 cleanup operations began to remove the first 289 ordnance found, including 285 Austro-Hungarian rifle grenades and 4 Austro-Hungarian spherical hand grenades from World War I. Over 6,500 warheads were removed, but according to military estimates, there are around 170,000 more underwater.

== Characteristics ==
The lake has a surface area of about 1.5 hectares and a maximum depth of 3.5 meters, with no significant inflows except for a few small streams. Since 1977 a 6.23-hectare area adjacent to the lake ("biotope Lake Varna marsh") has been protected due to its importance for the stopover of birds during migrations. Additionally, the lake's water is rich in iodine.

Lake Varna marsh biotope
- Interactive map of Lake Varna marsh biotope
- Location: Vahrn, South Tyrol, Italy
- Area: 6.23 ha (15.4 acres)
- Established: D.P.G.P. 218/V/81, 20 December 1988
- Governing body: Province of Bolzano
