= Johann August Stöger =

Austrian operatic tenor and theatre manager

Johann August Stöger (20 June 1791 – 7 May 1861) was an Austrian operatic tenor and later a theatre manager, leasing theatres in Vienna and Prague.

== Life ==
He was born in Stockerau, Lower Austria, son of Jacobus Althaler, a master mason. His parents sent him to be educated in Vienna, to prepare for the clergy. and as a boy he sang there in the choir of the Theater am Kärntnertor. He discontinued his theological studies, and taking the stage name Stöger, he sang in 1813 at the Theater in der Josefstadt, and in 1814 at the Theater an der Wien. He also appeared at theatres in Brno and Olomouc.

In 1816 he was engaged by Johann Liebich, manager of the Estates Theatre in Prague. His first tenor roles there were under the direction of Carl Maria von Weber, and he went on to appear in over thirty roles, including Tamino in Mozart's The Magic Flute. After Liebich's death in 1816 he was adviser to his widow Johanna, an actress, and they managed the theatre until 1821, when Franz Ignaz von Holbein took over.

Stöger and Johanna, whom he later married, moved to Graz, where from 1823 to 1833 he was director of the Schauspielhaus Graz; during this period the theatre burned down in December 1823. From 1825 to 1832 he was manager of the theatre in Bratislava, and he also appeared during the 1820s in Klagenfurt and Trieste.

=== Vienna and Prague ===
From 1832 to 1834 and from 1848 to 1849 he leased the Theater in der Josefstadt in Vienna; productions included the Vienna premiere of Meyerbeer's Robert le diable, the premiere of Das Nachtlager in Granada by Conradin Kreutzer, and the premiere of Der Verschwender by Ferdinand Raimund, who appeared in the production. From 1834 to 1846 and from 1852 to 1860 he leased the Estates Theatre in Prague. Productions there were mainly plays that were already successful in Vienna. Ferdinand Raimund and Johann Nestroy made guest appearances. In his management of theatres he was supported by Johanna; she died in Vienna in 1849.

In 1842 he built a new theatre in Rosengasse in Prague, with the intention of giving more productions in Czech. A production of Der Zauberschleier, by Franz Xaver Told, was successful, but the enterprise eventually failed, and he sold the building in 1846.

Franz Thomé took over the management of the Estates Theatre in 1858, but Stöger remained connected to this theatre. With Thomé he built in 1859 the Neustädter-Theater in Prague, but after conflicts with Thomé he moved to Munich to live with his daughter. He died there in 1861.

Stöger and Johanna's daughter Auguste (died 1868) was an opera singer, appearing in Hanover, Munich, Vienna and Darmstadt.
