= St. Coloman's Church, Schwangau =

Catholic Church in Schwangau, Germany

Coordinates: 47.5789°N 10.7490°E

Church of Saint Coloman
- The church of St Coloman's
- Church of Saint Coloman
- Location: Schwangau, Bavaria
- Country: Germany
- Denomination: Roman Catholic Church

History
- Founded: 15th century (first church), 17th century (current church)
- Consecrated: 1685

Architecture
- Architect: Johann Schmuzer
- Years built: 1673–1682

Administration
- Diocese: Diocese of Augsburg
- Parish: Schwangau

St. Coloman’s Church (Colomanskirche in German) is a Roman Catholic church in Schwangau, Bavaria, Germany. The church was built between 1673 and 1678 and consecrated in 1685. It is a Baroque church dedicated to Saint Coloman of Stockerau and is located in an open landscape at the foot of the Schwangau mountains, near Neuschwanstein Castle.

== History ==
According to local tradition, Coloman, an Irish pilgrim who was later venerated as a saint, stopped at the site of the present church while travelling towards the Holy Land around the year 1000. The tradition led to the development of a pilgrimage site dedicated to him. A chapel dedicated to Coloman existed at the site by the 15th century. A church consecration was recorded in 1495. As pilgrimage grew, the existing building eventually became too small, leading to the construction of the present church in the 17th century. In 1671, Johann Schmuzer, an architect and stucco artist from the Wessobrunn school, designed the new church. Construction began in 1673 under the mason Hieronymus Vogler. The main building was completed in 1678, while the bell tower was added in 1682. The church was consecrated on 9 May 1685. A cemetery wall was constructed in 1684, while a porch was added in 1714. In 1720, the church received a relic of Saint Coloman from Melk Abbey in Austria. The church has undergone several restorations, including work in 1719, 1836–1837, 1953 and 1977.

== Architecture ==
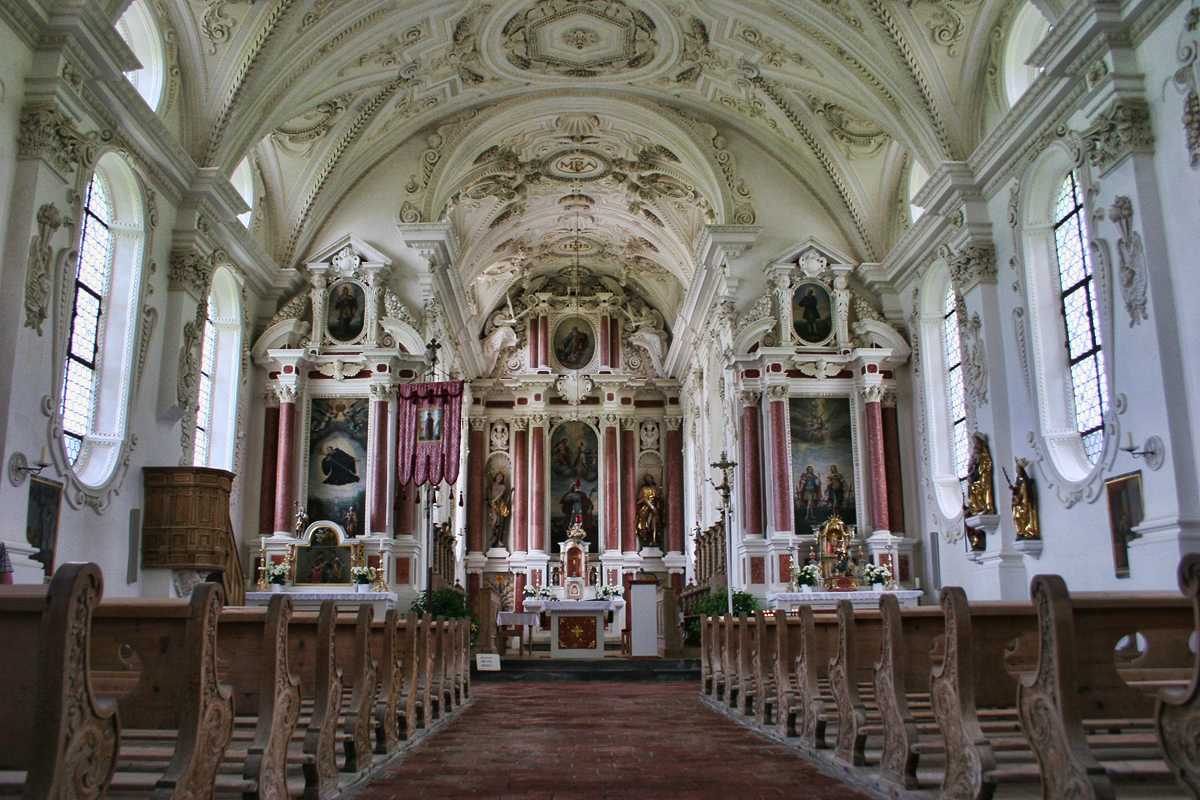
The interior

St. Coloman is an example of early Baroque church architecture in Bavaria. Its exterior combines Baroque elements with features reminiscent of late Gothic architecture. The building has a long nave with buttresses and rows of windows. The tower has a square lower section and an octagonal upper section crowned by a dome. The nave consists of five bays and is covered by a barrel vault with lunettes. Pilasters divide the interior walls, while a prominent cornice separates the upper round windows from the lower oval windows. The choir is narrower than the nave and is accompanied by a sacristy. The church’s isolated position in the countryside contributes to its distinctive appearance. The building stands against the backdrop of the Schwangau mountains and is situated close to Neuschwanstein Castle and Hohenschwangau Castle.
