= Neustift Abbey =

Monastery in Italy

- Kloster Neustift
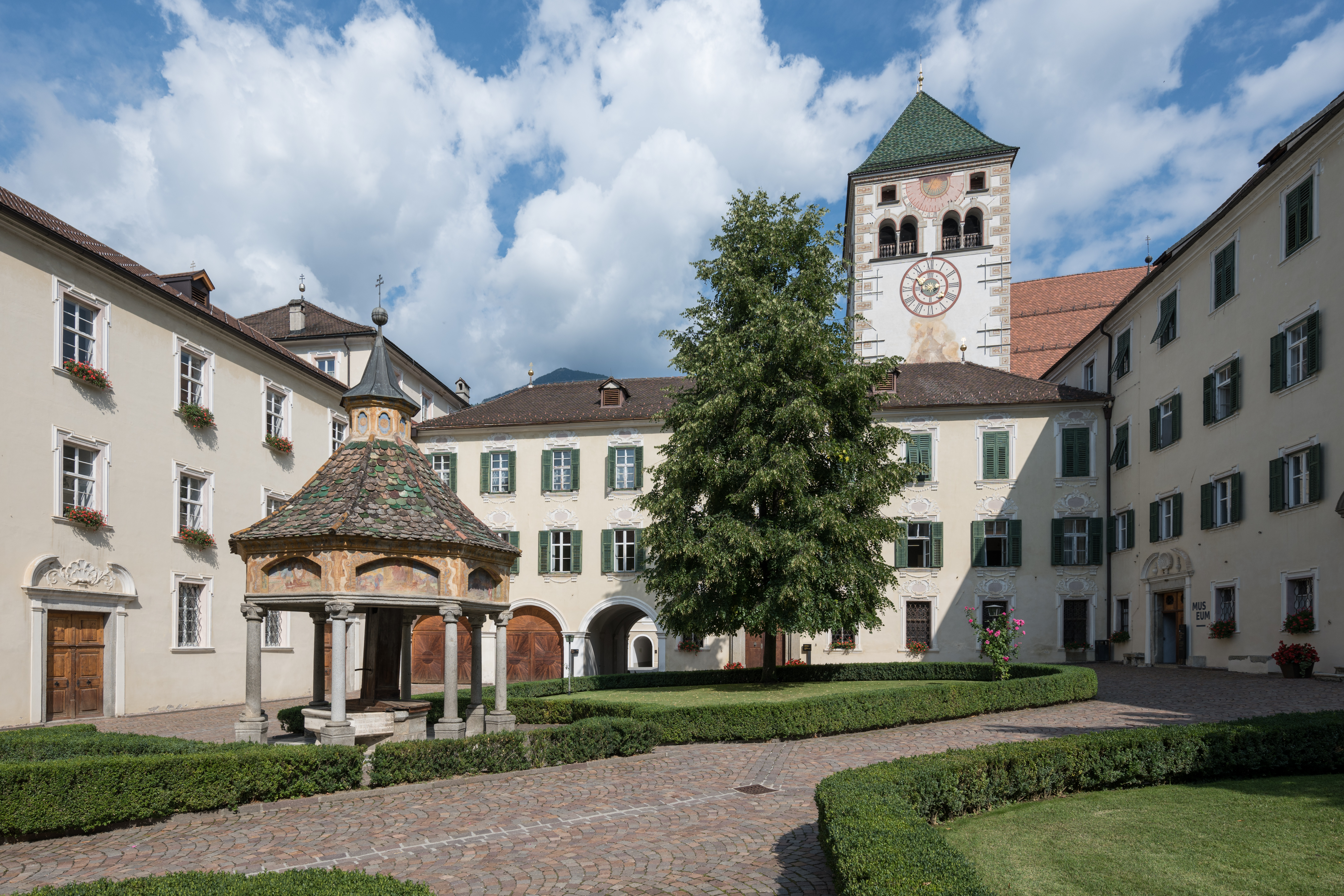
- Courtyard of Neustift Abbey

- Location within Italy
- Interactive map of Neustift Abbey

Monastery information
- Full name: The Augustinian Canons’ Monastery of Neustifz
- Other name: Das Augustiner Chorherrenstift Neustift
- Order: Augustinians
- Denomination: Catholic
- Established: 1142
- Archdiocese: Archdiocese of Trento
- Diocese: Diocese of Bolzano-Brixen

People
- Founder: Hartmann of Brixen

Architecture
- Status: basilica minor
- Functional status: active

Site
- Location: Vahrn, South Tyrol
- Country: Italy
- Coordinates: 46°44′33″N 11°38′54″E
- Public access: yes
- Website: https://kloster-neustift.it/en

Neustift Abbey, or Novacella Abbey, (German: Kloster Neustift; Italian: Abbazia di Novacella) is an Augustinian abbey in the municipality of Vahrn in the northern Italian province of South Tyrol. It was elevated to the status of a basilica in May 1956 and received the honorific of a basilica minor by Pope Pius XII.

== History ==
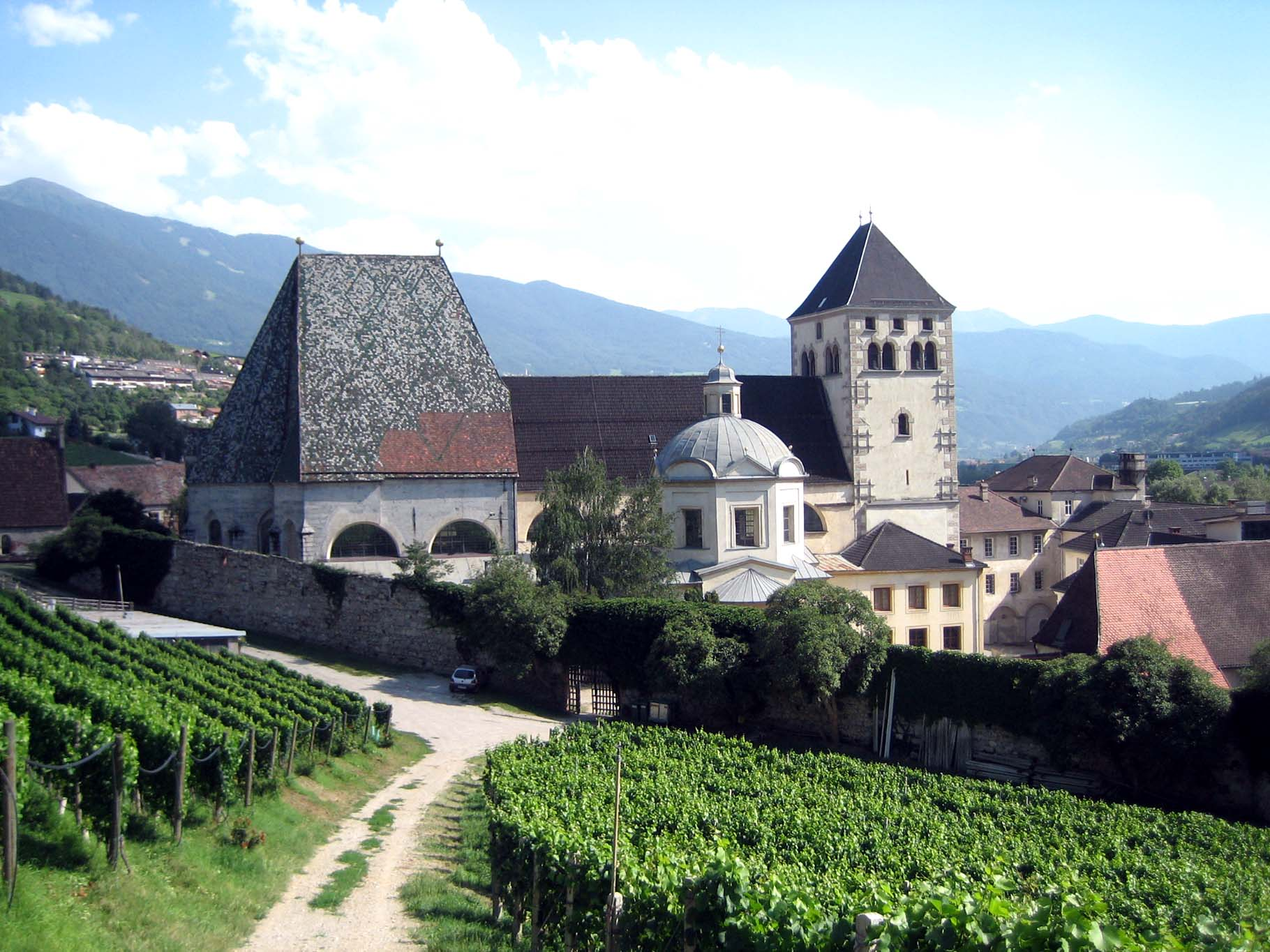
Abbey view from the north

The history of the monastery dates back to 1140s, when Blessed Hartman was appointed head of the bishopric of Brixen. A 45-minute drive west of the abbey is the Brenner Pass, one of the principal passes through the Alps. For thousands of years, its low altitude and relatively temperate weather have provided a route connecting Germanic Europe to Italy via the Eisack river valley. During the Holy Roman Empire, the road crossed the Brenner Pass, allowing armies, merchants, and pilgrims to traverse the mountain range. By the 10th century, the settlement of Prihsna, later known as Brixen, had sprung up, which became a stronghold of the Catholic Church. The Bishop of Brixen assumed that pilgrims from the north on their way to Rome would stop at the monastery. Construction began in 1142, the same year Bishop Hartmann consecrated the monastery church of Novacella. On April 9, 1143, the possessions of the monastery were legalized by Pope Innocent II. While other orders and their abbeys were isolated, the Augustinians placed their monasteries along roads so that they could be a shelter for travelers.

A fire destroyed the monastery in April 1190, and it was rebuilt over several years under the leadership of Provost Konrad II of Rodank (1178–1200). In 1198 the abbey church was re-consecrated. In the same year, the newly erected hospital chapel of the Redeemer was consecrated at the entrance to the abbey (today’s Chapel of St. Michael’s or Engelsburg). The monastery became a spiritual and cultural center, and in 1221 the abbey received the rights of patronage over the parish of Olang. The incorporation of the parish of Völs took place in 1257, and the Assling parish was transferred to the abbey by the archbishops of Salzburg in 1261. From its founding and throughout history, the abbey has been a haven for Northern European pilgrims on their way to Rome or the Holy Land.

In the second half of the fifteenth and early sixteenth centuries, the choir was built in the late Gothic style with its characteristic steep roof and numerous Gothic altarpieces by famous artists of the time, such as Michael and Friedrich Pacher, Meister von Uttenheim, and Max Reichlich. Between 1439 and 1446, the canon Friedrich Zollner wrote a two-volume gradual, and Stephan Stetner created a missal that was an exhibit at the World's Fair in Vienna in the late 19th century. Choral singing in the abbey reached a high level.

Located at the crossroads of important routes in the Alps, the abbey was far enough away from the hustle and bustle of population centers. On the other hand, it was an ideal place for sheltering pilgrims, travelers, the sick and the poor according to the canons of hospitality. In 1483 the Dominican theologian Felix Faber of Augsburg wrote in his travel memoirs about the abbey: "It has a large church with precious ornaments and a good library".

In 1807, in accordance with Napoleon's policy of suppressing religious orders, the abbey was dissolved by the Bavarian authorities. Tyrol was returned to the Austrian Empire in 1813, and in 1816 by order of Emperor Francis II the Abbey of Neustift was restored.

== Architecture ==
The monastery is a fortified complex that can be accessed via a small bridge. It consists of several buildings built at different times in different styles. For example, the church bell tower is Romanesque; the choir and altar are Gothic; the church and library are Baroque and Rococo, respectively. In the courtyard of the monastery is a covered well with arcaded panels under the roof, built during the Renaissance period. It is called "well of wonders" because of the octagonal aedicule built over it, which depicts The Seven Wonders of the World (one wonder per corner; the eighth depicts the abbey itself). The upper frescoes depict the Seven Wonders of the Ancient World, created by Austrian Renaissance artists, which testify to the broad-mindedness of the ministers and their desire to expand knowledge despite the restrictions and confined world of the monastery. The octagonal roof is complemented by an eighth panel, which one of the monks filled with an image of the monastery.

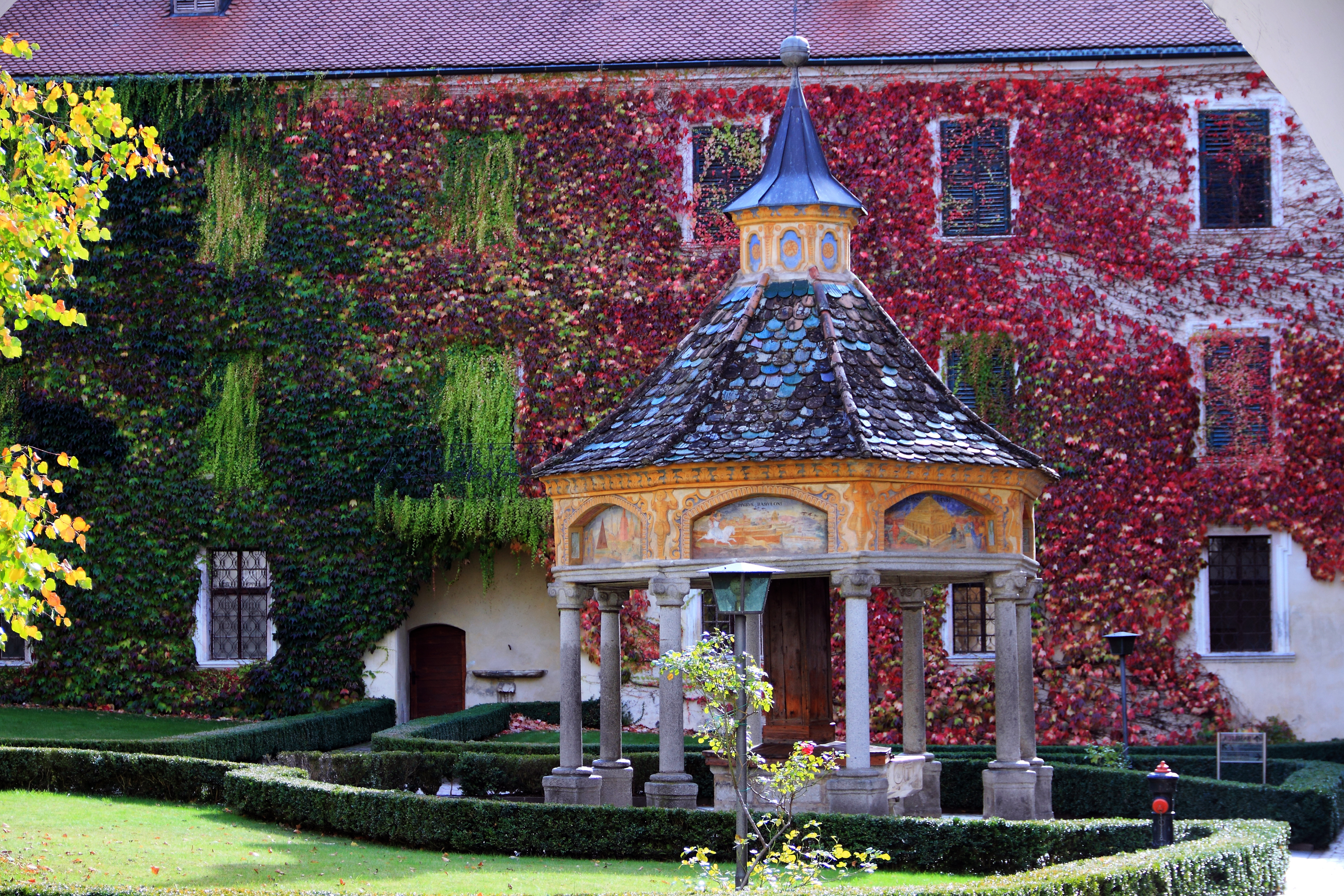
The well of wonders

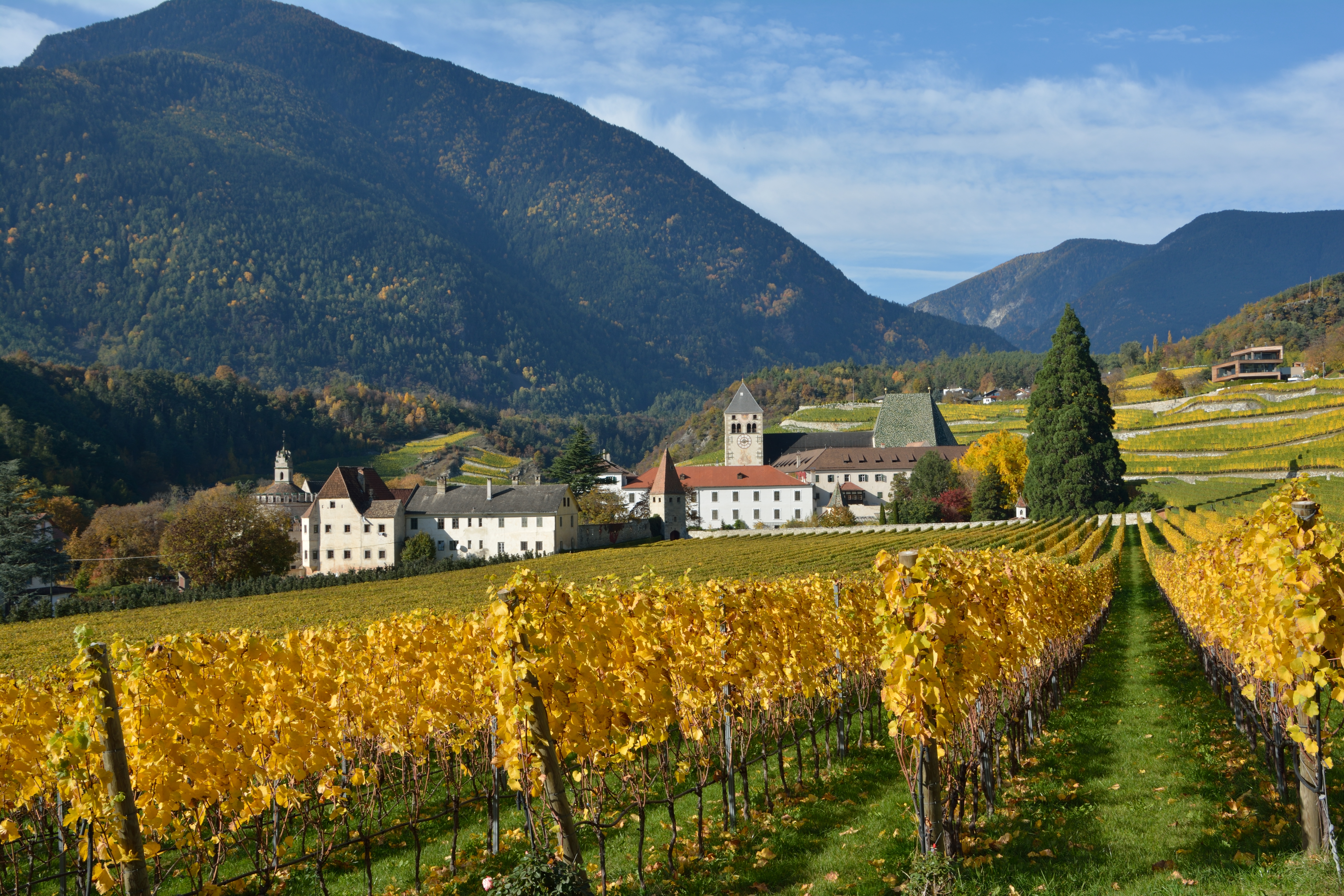
View of the abbey, south side

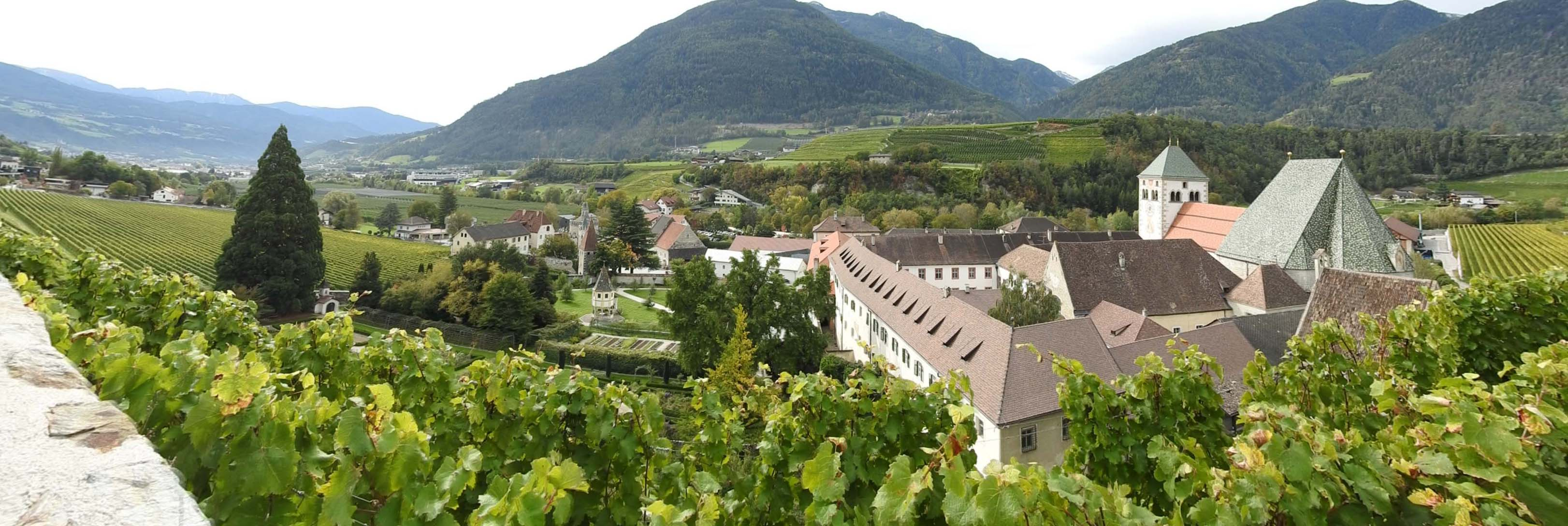
Cultural heritage monument.

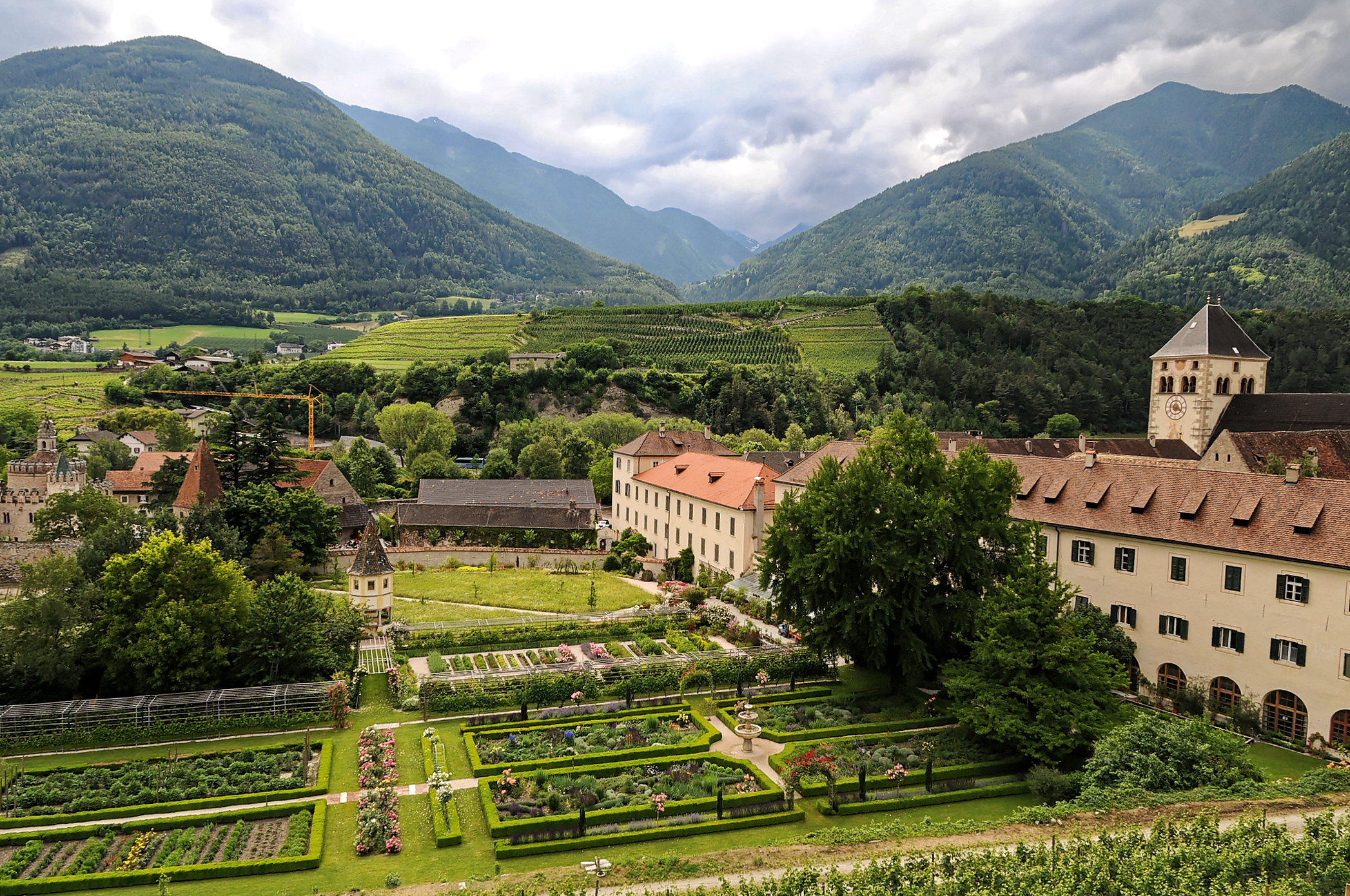
The garden in the monastery, general view.

At the entrance to the largest monastic complex in Tyrol is the chapel of St. Michael, also known as Angel's Castle (Engelsburg in German), because it resembles the Roman Castle of the Holy Angel. The abbey has a church whose main hall was created by the sculptor and architect Antonio Giuseppe Sartori of Trento in the South Tyrolean Rococo style. The monastery's wine cellar was built more than 850 years ago. The church of Mary's Assumption is connected to a medieval monastery, a museum and an art gallery with a significant collection of medieval paintings of the late period and wall paintings. The historic garden is divided into a botanical and a tree garden. The abbey is also home to a cloister for Augustinian canons, a conference center, a library, a school and dormitory for children, vineyards and winery. The abbey library occupies two floors and contains about 65,000 printed volumes (mostly on scientific and theological subjects) and numerous manuscripts with colorfully decorated miniatures.

== Winemaking and tourism ==
There has been a winery in the abbey since 1142. At the end of World War I, with the collapse of the Austro-Hungarian Empire, the Südtirol region, including Brixen and the Abbey of Novacella, was annexed by Italy and was called Alto Adige. Under Mussolini the Germanic names were converted to Italian ones (Brixen became Bressanone). After World War II, South Tyrol (Alto Adige) gained autonomy under the Italian government, and German-language education was once again allowed. Thus, the wine labels from the abbey carry two names: Abbazia di Novacella and Stiftskellerei Neustift. The Italian name refers to the abbey, the Germanic one to the winery, and thus the names underscore the unique historical identity of Südtirol.

The vineyards are located in the valley of the river Eisack and on the slopes of the hills. The terraces on the slopes are enclosed by stone laid out several hundred years ago. The stone walls stabilize the slope and reflect the heat of the day. The most famous wine produced in the abbey is Kerner. The oenology of this grape variety has been in production at the Abbey since the 1970s. The grape variety, bred by crossing Schiava and Riesling in 1929, was intended to produce wines organoleptically similar to Riesling, but with the yields of the Schiava variety. It is named after Justinus Kerner, famous for his table songs. Abbazia di Novacella Kerner won the German market, then spread to America. In 2009, the influential Italian company Gambero Rosso named Celestino Lucin, the abbey's oenologist, winemaker of the year.

The abbey school, pilgrimage site, almshouse, and winery have made Novacella Abbey a European landmark. The scale and impeccable condition of the abbey, given its almost thousand-year age, make it a major attraction for tourists, pilgrims, and wine enthusiasts.

== See also ==
- Hartmann of Brixen
- Diocese of Bolzano-Brixen
- South Tyrol wine
- Order of Saint Augustine
