= Franz Daxecker =

Austrian ophthalmologist and historian of science (born 1945)

Franz Daxecker (born 24 May 1945 in Munderfing) is an Austrian ophthalmologist and a historian of science.

== Biography ==
Franz Daxecker was a typographer from 1959 to 1965. He attended the Bundesaufbau-Gymnasium in Horn from 1965 to 1970. He studied at the University of Innsbruck, Austria, and received his doctorate in 1975. In 1985. he was habilitated and in 1993 appointed as the associate professor. He is the deputy director of the Department of Ophthalmology and Optometry at the Innsbruck Medical University since 1984, and was director between 2006 and 2007. He wrote ophthalmological publications with reference to the refraction (spectacle determination) with the laser, the calculation of intraocular lens, the influence of ultraviolet to the eye as well as the treatment of eye neoplasm.

Daxecker published extensively about the astronomer Christoph Scheiner but also Oswald von Wolkenstein, Christoph Grienberger, Giovanni Antonio Scopoli, Felice Fontana, Pietro Andrea Mattioli, Ludwig Mauthner, Richard Seefelder, Kaspar Pischel, Friedrich von Herrenschwand, Burghard Breitner and Herbert Schober. Other documents relating to spectacles representations of the Middle Ages, the history of Innsbruck Medical University, and medicinal plants in the Middle Ages in ophthalmology. He also wrote contributions to encyclopedias.

== Awards and honors ==
- Dr. Adele Rabensteiner Award
- Chairman, Honorary member of the Julius Hirschberg Society
- Recording in the European Academy of Sciences and Arts
- Merit Medal of the Government of Tyrol

== Selected publications ==
- 125 Jahre Universitäts-Augenklinik in Innsbruck 1869–1994: Ihre Vorstände (125 Years University Clinic of Ophthalmology) (= Forschungen zur Innsbrucker Universitätsgeschichte (Research for Innsbruck University History), Vol. 18; = Publications of the University of Innsbruck, vol.201). Wagner, Innsbruck 1994, ISBN 3-901249-14-1.
- "Representations of eyeglasses on Gothic winged altars in Austria". In: Documenta Ophthalmologica, 93, 169-188 (1997)
- Das Hauptwerk des Astronomen P. Christoph Scheiner SJ Rosa Ursina sive Sol: eine Zusammenfassung (The Main Work of the Astronomer P. Christoph Scheiner SJ "Rosa Ursina sive Sol": a Summary, (= Berichte des Naturwissenschaftlich-Medizinischen Vereins in Innsbruck. (Reports of the Natural Sciences and the Medical Association in Innsbruck. Wagner, Innsbruck 1996, ISBN 3-7030-0300-6, Suppl. 13)
- The Physicist and Astronomer Christoph Scheiner: Biography, Letters, Works (= Veröffentlichungen der Universität Innsbruck. Bd. 246). Leopold-Franzens-Universität, Innsbruck 2004, ISBN 3-901249-69-9.
- Briefe des Naturwissenschaftlers Christoph Scheiner SJ an Erzherzog Leopold V. von Österreich-Tirol 1620–1632 (Letters of the Scientist Christoph Scheiner SJ to Archduke Leopold V of Austria-Tirol 1620-1632) (= Veröffentlichungen der Universität Innsbruck. (Publications of the University of Innsbruck.), Vol. 207). Publikationsstelle der Universität Innsbruck, Innsbruck 1995, ISBN 3-901249-21-4.
- "Christoph Scheiner's Main Work "Rosa Ursina sive Sol". In: Acta Universitatis Carolinae – Mathematica et Physica 46, Suppl., 27-140 (2005)
- "Christoph Scheiner's Eye Studies". In: Documenta Ophthalmologica 81:27-35 (1992)
- "Further studies of Christoph Scheiner's concerning the optics of the eye". In: Documenta ophthalmologica 86, 153 - 161 (1994).
- with Lav Subaric: Christoph Scheiners "Sol ellipticus" (= Veröffentlichungen der Universität Innsbruck. (Publications of the University of Innsbruck.) Vol. 226). Leopold-Franzens-Universität, Innsbruck 1998, ISBN 3-901249-39-7
- "Heilpflanzen der Augenheilkunde im Wiener Dioskurides". In: Klin Mbl Augenheilk 224, 611-612 (2007).
- "Heilpflanzen der Augenheilkunde in der Dioskurides-Übersetzung (Materia medica) des Pietro Andrea Matthioli". In: Julius-Hirschberg-Gesellschaft zur Geschichte der Augenheilkunde, Bd. 11, Verlag Königshausen & Neumann 2009, 343–355, ISBN 978-3-8260-5500-3.
- "Christoph Scheiner and the Physiological Optics of the Eye". In: Klin Mbl Augenheilk 231, 1034-1036 (2013).
- "Christopher Scheiner Physicist and Astronomer". In: Historia Ophthalmologica Internationalis, Tomus I, Fasciculus 1, Martius 2015, S. 91-18, http://histoph.com/daxecker-scheiner
- "Leonardo da Vinci und the Vision". In: Klin Mbl Augenheilk 230, 736-737 (2013)
- "A retrospective chronobiological study of sunspot cycles by Christoph Scheiner". In: Acta Historica Astronomiae 64, 351-356 (2018).
- "'Magnitudine, claritate & amplitudine incredibili'. Der Bau des Keplerschen Fernrohres durch Christoph Scheiner". In: Acta Historica Astronomiae, Vol 66, Beiträge zur Astronomiegeschichte, Vol 14, 65–72 (2019).
