= Friedrich Hassel =

German opera singer

Friedrich Hassel, real name Friedrich Laube, (23 April 1815 in Spangenberg or Kassel – 29 September 1884) was a German child actor, stage actor, operatic tenor and opera director.

== Life ==
Hassel's stepfather, who was engaged at the Staatstheater Kassel, approved of it when he became interested in the stage at an early age. At the age of nine he entered the stage for the first time as a "choirboy" and one year later he already sang the "first boy" in The Magic Flute.

He received his education in the theater school of the court theater and made such progress that he could already accept an engagement in Heiligenstadt near Göttingen in 1830. In the same year he was engaged to Bremen. There he also discovered his voice, took lessons with Ferdinand Pillwitz and got himself cast before long as "Telasco" in Gaspare Spontini's Cortez to stormy applause. Besides his singing career he didn't neglect acting and enjoyed great popularity especially in the genre of youthful, humorous roles.

His next engagement led him to Rostock, then he came to Königsberg as an opera director, as well as representative of the humorous roles in acting and opera. There he worked until 1857. That same year he was an actor in Breslau and Bremen at the same time before he went to Prague in 1858. There he stayed until the end of his life at 69. He had his last appearance on 29 April 1882.

His wife was Theodora Hassel whose daughter, the singer Katharina Hassel (1837-1905), was married to the actor Konrad Adolf Hallenstein.
