= Declaration of Rhense =

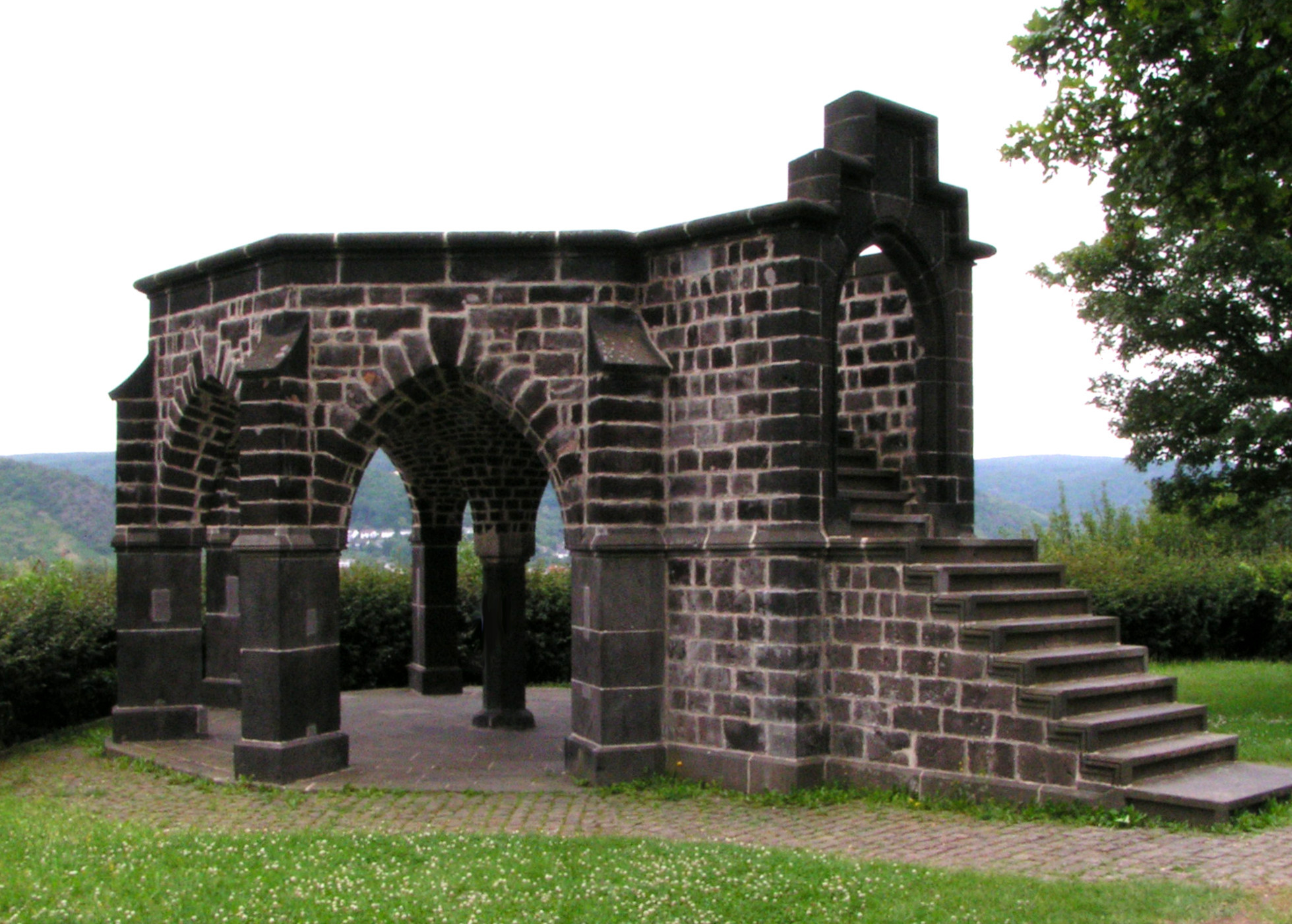
Reconstruction of the Königsstuhl (King's Chair) at Rhens

The Declaration of Rhens or Treaty of Rhens (German: Kurverein von Rhens) was a political alliance or Kurverein (lit. Election Union) formed in 1338 between the prince-electors of the Holy Roman Empire. They declared that the only requirement for holding the title of King of the Romans was being elected by a majority of Kurverein members; the Pope's approval was no longer necessary for being considered the rightful and legitimate ruler.

== Background ==
In 1314 Louis of Wittelsbach had been elected King of the Romans against Frederick of Habsburg at Frankfurt, however with the decisive fourth vote cast by the Elector John II of Saxe-Lauenburg. The election was denied not only by the rival duchy of Saxe-Wittenberg but also by the Archbishop of Cologne, who traditionally held the privilege to crown the elected king at Aachen. Moreover, Henry of Carinthia had acted as the Bohemian elector, voting for Frederick, although he had already been deposed as king by John of Luxembourg in 1310. Louis was crowned by Peter von Aspelt, the Archbishop of Mainz, while Frederick of Habsburg received consecration by the Cologne archbishop, though not at Aachen but in Bonn. The legal uncertainty of the double election resulted in a long-standing conflict, finally settled by the 1322 Battle of Mühldorf in favour of Louis.

The controversy broadened as Pope John XXII in Avignon, willing to restore the papal claim to power, nevertheless dependent on the French royal House of Capet, refused to acknowledge Louis' election. Instead he took the occasion to install Robert of Naples from the Capetian House of Anjou as "Senator of Rome" and regent of the Imperial Kingdom of Italy in 1317. The king however was the choice of the Ghibelline party which included not only the House of Wittelsbach but also the Bohemian Luxembourgs and the Milanese Visconti. The pope accused Louis of having usurped the royal title without papal approbation as he was crowned by the "wrong" archbishop. The conflict escalated with the declaration of anathema and interdict by the pope against the king and all his supporters in 1324.

King Louis, no longer contested in Germany, now was able to campaign Italy, where he obtained the Iron Crown of Lombardy in 1327, while the papal regent Robert of Naples was deposed. One year later he was crowned Holy Roman Emperor per acclamation by the "people of Rome" under the Ghibelline leader Sciarra Colonna without any participation of the pope. Thereafter he nominated Antipope Nicholas V to receive consecration from him. Nevertheless, the political situation in Italy changed again in favour of the House of Anjou, revealing that the Emperor could not actually maintain his sovereignty. Louis was forced to return to Germany, leaving the conflict with the papacy unsettled.

== Agreement ==
In view of the denied recognition by the pope, the prince-electors saw the necessity to affirm their franchise. On 16 July 1338 six electors from Cologne, Mainz and Trier, Saxe-Wittenberg, Brandenburg and the Electorate of the Palatinate met at the Nussbaumgarten in Rhens to support Emperor Louis IV. Even though the practice of election of the Holy Roman Emperor had finally prevailed since the fall of the House of Hohenstaufen, it was now fixed that the election by all or the majority of the electors automatically conferred the royal title and rule over the empire, without papal confirmation. The convened prince-electors decided that "Louis is the rightfully elected King of the Romans, and his legitimate power (in the German kingdom) is not dependent upon the pope's will".

In coincidence with the Emperor's loss of power over Italy the decree meant a decisive step beyond the universal claim of the translatio imperii derived from the Roman Empire and conveyed by the pope. Louis reacted with two mandates of 6 August 1338, stating that the Emperor-elect is vested with complete Imperial rights and all estates are obliged to ignore dissenting papal decretals. In 1356 the Golden Bull issued by Emperor Charles IV of Luxembourg specified the procedures for imperial election, the electoral college - including the Bohemian king - having already been those seven by custom. As a result the monarch, no longer subject to papal approbation, became increasingly dependent on the favour of the electors.

The declaration is not to be confused with another meeting of electors at Rhens on 20 August 1400 to depose King Wenceslaus of Luxembourg and elect Rupert of Wittelsbach.

== See also ==
- Erbreichsplan
- List of treaties
