= Konrad Adolf Hallenstein =

German actor

Konrad Adolf Hallenstein, also Conrad Hallenstein (15 January 1835 – 28 September 1892) was a German actor.

== Life and career ==
Born in Frankfurt, Hallenstein was the son of director and farce poet Ernst Hallenstein (d. 1881). He received his acting training in Frankfurt and Hamburg before he made his debut at the Frankfurter Stadttheater in the role of Raoul in The Maid of Orleans in 1852. After that Hallenstein played in 1856 in Hamburg, in 1857 in Königsberg and in 1858 in Aachen. From 6 April 1858 to 1 May 1871 Hallenstein ended his Prague engagement after 1,295 evenings on 1 May 1871 with König Ottokars Glück und Ende. - See: Theatre, Art and Literature. (...) Konrad Hallenstein, who yesterday (...). In: Neues Fremden-Blatt, 2 May 1871, p. 05 (Online at ANNO) and theater, art and literature. (...) From Prague, 2nd d., is written: Herr Hallenstein took yesterday (...). In: Neues Fremden-Blatt, 4 May 1871, p. 06 (Online at ANNO). He was a member of the Estates Theatre (Königlichen Landestheater resp. The "Königlich deutschen Landestheater") in Prague Franz Thomé being director, but also gave guest performances in other cities (Frankfurt, Graz, Dresden, Berlin, Vienna).

Hallenstein belonged from 3 May 1871 (Note: After rehearsals from May 3, 1871 Hallenstein was first seen on 5 May 1871 in Karl Gutzkow's drama Uriel Acosta. - See: Theatre in Vienna (...) Repertoire of the Imperial and Royal Hofburgtheater. Friday, 5 May (...). In: Die Presse (1848–1896), 4 May 1871, p. 16 (Online at ANNO).) until 13 November 1890 to the Burgtheater in Vienna. He performed a total of 156 days in 1877. He took part both in the farewell performance in 1888 in the old house of the Burgtheater (in the role of King Thoas in Goethe's Iphigenia in Tauris) and in the first performance in the new house of the Burgtheater on 14 October.

From 1859, under the name Höllenstein das Tausendguldenkraut in Prague, Hallenstein was one of the founders of the Schlaraffia. In Vienna he was one of the co-founders of the Schlaraffia Vindobona in 1877.

In 1890 Hallenstein retired because of "weakness of memory" and moved, hoping to alleviate his suffering, to Baden bei Wien (Note: Until 1891 Hallenstein was registered as a resident in Vienna-Josefstadt, Landesgerichtsstraße 18- See: Lehmann's Allgemeiner Wohnungs-Anzeiger. Volume 1891, third part, p. 504, online.) in a villa built according to his order (Helenenstraße 20).

On 27 September 1892, the K-k Hofburg actor went completely insane and had to be brought to the private sanatorium of Dr. Löwy in Purkersdorf where he died a day later at age 57. He was buried on 30 September of that year at the Matzleinsdorf Protestant Cemetery (Group 24, No. 35) in Vienna. (Note: His wife, Katharina, and her mother, Theodora Hassel, were (first) buried at the municipal cemetery of Baden near Vienna. – See: Delta: Lokal-Nachrichten. Katharina Hallenstein †. In: Badener Zeitung, 4 February 1905, p. 03 (Online at ANNO).)

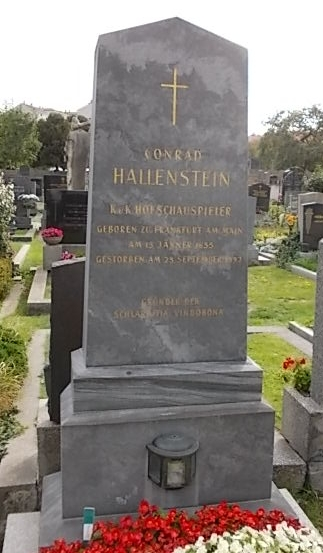
Konrad Hallenstein's tomb stone

Katharina Hassel (also Käthi; 1837–1905), daughter of the actor and opera singer Friedrich Hassel and Theodora Hassel, was singer/actress at the German Theater Prague and Hallenstein's wife, their son, Adolf Hallenstein, secretary at the Stadttheater Baden.

== Honours ==
- k.k. Hofschauspieler (1876)
- Knight's Cross of the Order of Franz Joseph (1890)
