= Franz Thomé =

Austrian theatre director and actor

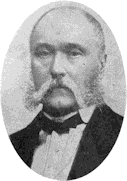
Franz Thomé

Franz Thomé (21 November 1807 – 22 May 1872) was an Austrian theatre director and actor.

== Life ==
Born in Vienna, Thomé was the son of an official of the Russian Ambassador in Vienna, Prince Andrey Razumovsky. After his father's death his mother moved with him to Dresden, where he completed high school. When his mother remarried, the family moved back to Vienna, where he began his theatre career at the age of 17. He had his first engagements in Vienna, Mainz and Paris, where the company he belonged to failed financially. From 1837 Thomé played first in Pest and then in Nürnberg. Shortly thereafter he took over the direction of the theatre in Ljubljana, which at that time was connected with that of Trieste. In 1847 he was engaged by Count Skarbek after Lemberg in his newly built theatre as artistic director, but returned to Ljubljana, Trieste and Klagenfurt as early as 1848. In 1850 he took over the direction of the Landständisches Theater in Graz. A saying of this time - based on the excellent stage design he supported - was: One must hear the prophet in Vienna and see it in Gratz."

From 22 March 1853 until 1858 he was director of the theatre in Riga. From 1859 he led - first together with Johann August Stöger - the Prague Estates Theatre. When he threw himself with it in 1860 because of financial discrepancies, he continued to run the theatre alone until 1864. Some well-known actors, like the later Viennese Burgschauspieler Konrad Adolf Hallenstein and the singers Franz Innozenz Nachbaur and Eduard Bachmann, he brought into his ensemble. After a short interruption he led this theatre again from 1865 to 1866, until it was closed by the Austro-Prussian War. A foundation of Thomé was the New Town, Prague theatre he built at his own expense, from 1868 he also directed the stage of Linz.

In 1870 Thomé suffered a stroke, terminated his contract in Linz and returned to Prague, where he died in 1872 at age 68 after a second stroke.

He was married twice, from 1837 (in Pest) with the local singer and chorist Dlle. Baumgärtner and after his move to Prague with the singer Dlle. Günther; from this second marriage he had a daughter.

Thomé founded the Artists' and Society Schlaraffia together with some of his actors and singers on 10 October 1859 in Prague.
