= Eduard Bachmann =

German opera singer (1831–1880)

- Born: September 22, 1831; Prague
- Died: April 18, 1880 (aged 48); Karlsbad
- Occupations: Oboist, operatic tenor, theatre director

Eduard Bachmann (22 September 1831 – 18 April 1880) was a German oboist, operatic tenor and theatre director.

== Life and career ==
Born in Prague, Bachmann attended the Prague Conservatory, where he studied oboe playing under the direction of Professor Bauer. As a trained oboist, Bachmann undertook a concert tour through Germany with the music director Joseph Labitzky in 1849, was engaged in the theatre orchestra of Preßburg in 1850/51, then went to Dresden, where he was engaged in the military band of the Saxon Life Guards. In 1853, he became a member of the orchestra of Johann Strauss I. One year later, he was engaged for the orchestra of the Hungarian National Theatre in Pest.

There, he began to train as a singer. On 14 February 1855, he made his debut at the Hungarian National Theatre as "Carlo" in the opera Ernani. He sang several times in the Hungarian and German theaters and worked from December 1855 to March 1856 at the Darmstadt court theater. After that, he went to Agram and worked as a Heldentenor in Amsterdam from October 1856 to June 1857. On 31 July 1857, he made his debut in Prague with director Franz Thomé, where he stayed until October 1864.

In the same year, he accepted a lifelong engagement at the Hoftheater in Kassel, which was dissolved after the death of the elector in 1867. From 1867 to 1868, he worked at the Hoftheater Dresden, from 1868 to 1871 at the Hoftheater Munich, after interventions from even the king and Richard Wagner to get the artist released from his Dresden contract. It was also Wagner's idea to use him as Siegfried in his Ring cycle, but Bachmann rejected these plans.

He fell ill with diphtheria twice, and his voice deteriorated. He retired from the stage in 1870 at the age of only 39.

He moved to Karlovy Vary, where in 1873 he took over the direction of the theatre for two years.

Bachmann died by suicide on 18 April 1880 in Karlsbad, at the age of 48.
