= Stockerau =

- Municipality
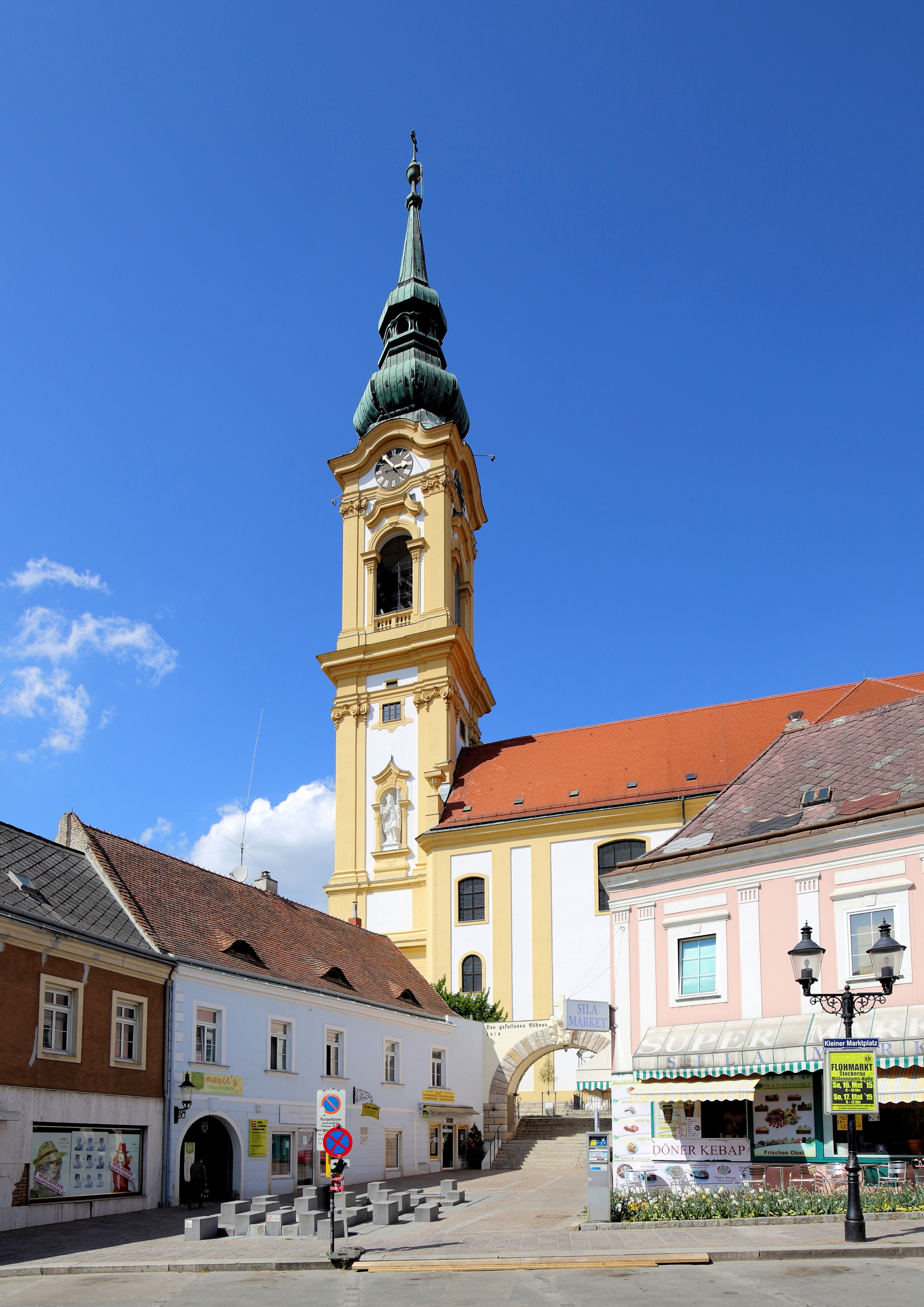
- Saint Stephen Church

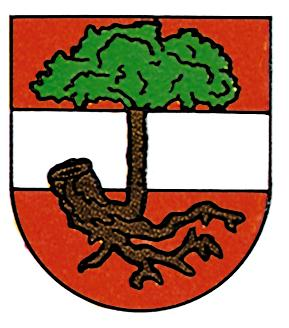
- Coat of arms

- Location within Austria
- Coordinates: 48°23′N 16°13′E
- Country: Austria
- State: Lower Austria
- District: Korneuburg

Government
  - Mayor: Andrea Völkl (ÖVP)

Area
  - Total: 37.41 km^{2} (14.44 sq mi)
- Elevation: 176 m (577 ft)

Population (2018-01-01)
  - Total: 16,916
  - Density: 452.2/km^{2} (1,171/sq mi)
- Time zone: UTC+1 (CET)
  - Summer (DST): UTC+2 (CEST)
- Postal code: 2000, 2003
- Area code: 02266
- Website: https://www.stockerau.at/

Stockerau (German pronunciation: [ʃtɔkəˈʁaʊ]) is a town in the district of Korneuburg in Lower Austria, Austria. Stockerau has 16,974 inhabitants, which makes it the largest town in the Weinviertel. Stockerau is also called "Lenaustadt" (Lenau Town) because the Austrian poet Nikolaus Lenau often spent time with his grandparents here.

== Population ==
Historical population
| Year | Pop. | ±% |
|---|---|---|
| 1869 | 7,868 | — |
| 1880 | 8,051 | +2.3% |
| 1890 | 8,584 | +6.6% |
| 1900 | 10,410 | +21.3% |
| 1910 | 11,958 | +14.9% |
| 1923 | 11,339 | −5.2% |
| 1934 | 11,526 | +1.6% |
| 1939 | 13,924 | +20.8% |
| 1951 | 11,336 | −18.6% |
| 1961 | 11,996 | +5.8% |
| 1971 | 12,852 | +7.1% |
| 1981 | 12,679 | −1.3% |
| 1991 | 13,608 | +7.3% |
| 2001 | 14,452 | +6.2% |
| 2011 | 15,657 | +8.3% |
| 2021 | 16,789 | +7.2% |

== Amenities ==
Leisure facilities are various: wellness centre, sports centre with three gyms, judo and table tennis gym, skittle alley and football stadium. In addition there are indoor and outdoor tennis facilities.

Stockerau offers a range of exhibitions, concerts, readings and singing evenings in the cultural centre "Belvedereschlößl". In the cellar of this castle, built in 16th century and revitalised by the town community in the year 1984, you will find the district museum.

Between Stockerau and the Danube there is a large forest called the "Au".

Saint Coloman was martyred here in 1012, and is known as St. Coloman of Stockerau.

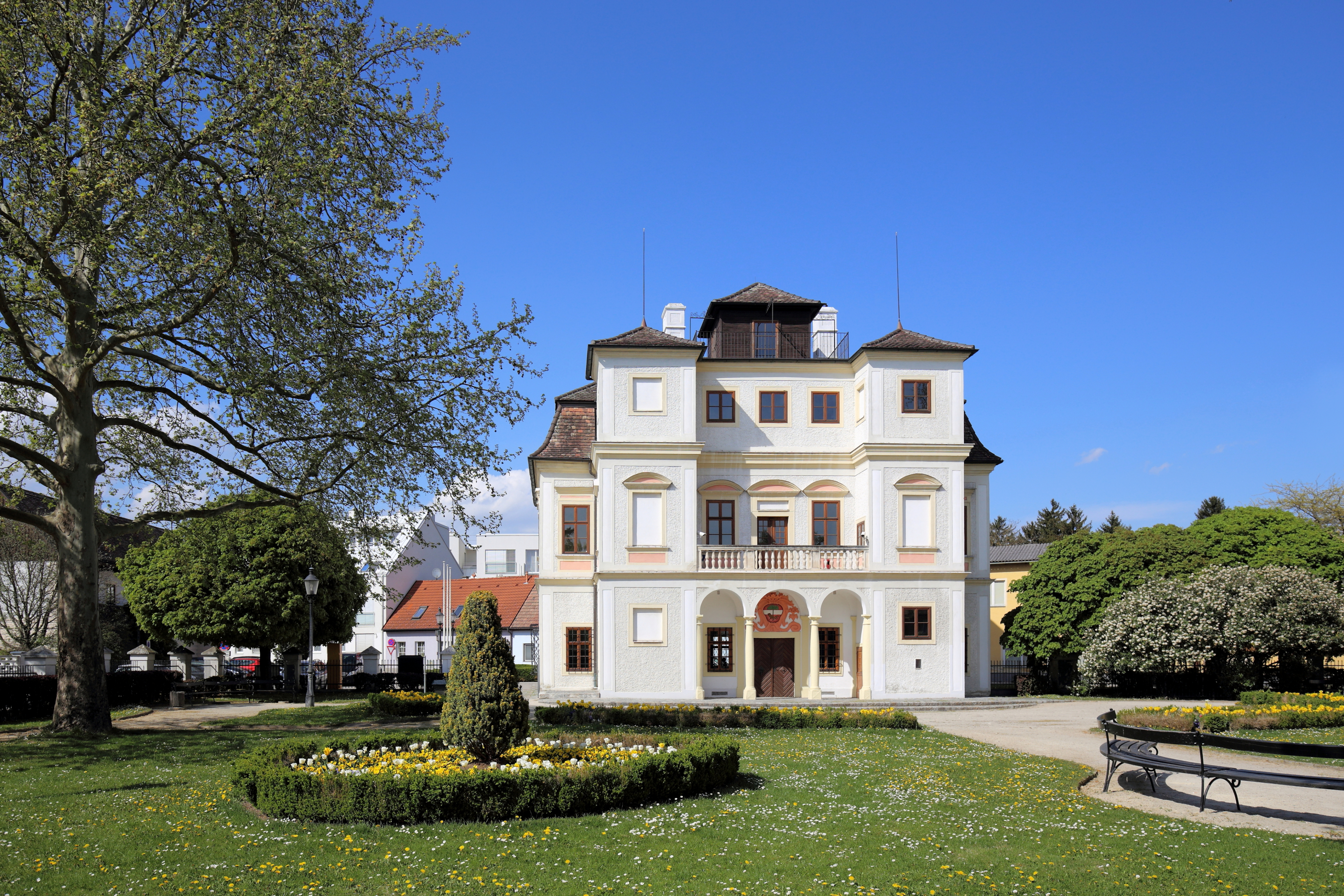
Belevedere castle

== Mayors ==
List of all mayors of Stockerau according to the official homepage of the town:

- 1893–1908 Julius Schaumann
- 1908–1912 Josef Weineck
- 1912–1914 Wenzel Kreuz
- 1919–1927 Eduard Rösch
- 1927–1933 Josef Wolfik
- 1933–1938 Johann Schidla
- 1938–1945 Heinrich Mayrl
- 1945–1970 Josef Wondrak (SPÖ) (1893–1982)
- 1970–1979 Franz Blabolil
- 1979–2006 Leopold Richentzky
- 2006–2019 Helmut Laab
- since 2019 Andrea Völkl

== Transportation ==
Given its relatively close distance to Vienna, S3 of the Vienna S-Bahn operates half-hourly service to Vienna as well as hourly service to Hollabrunn. Regional trains operate from Vienna to Retz and Znojmo in the north and Wiener Neustadt and Payerbach-Reichenau in the south.

== Notable people ==
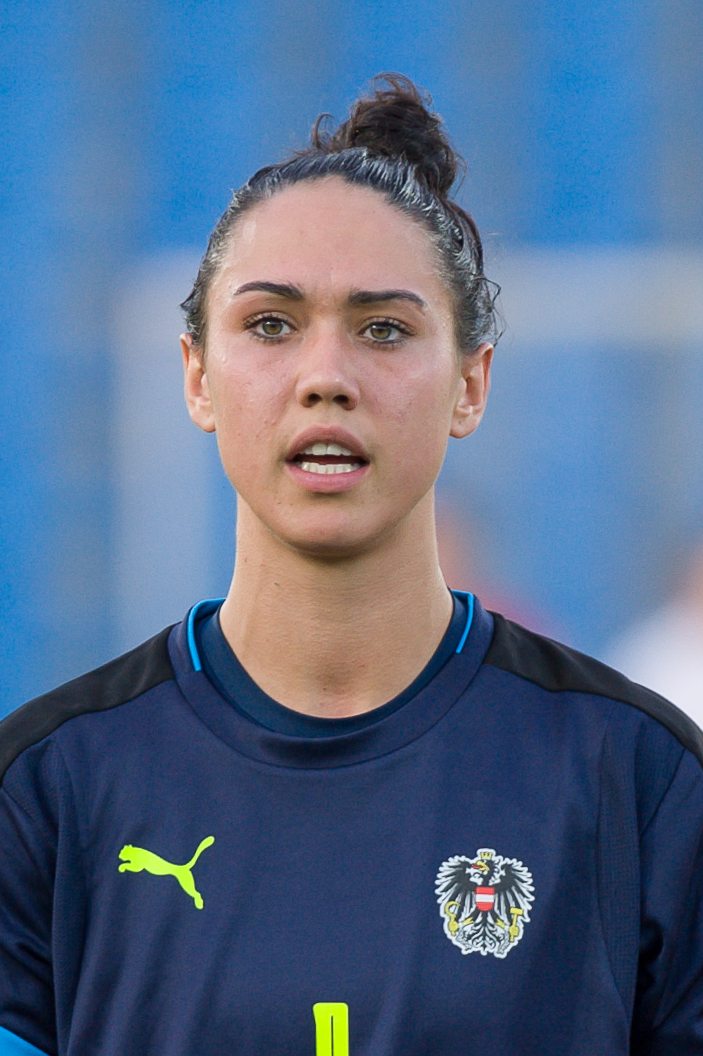
Manuela Zinsberger, 2017

- Johann August Stöger (1791–1861), an Austrian operatic tenor and later a theatre manager
- Ernst Herbeck (1920–1991), German poet, long time committal in a mental institution
- Wolfgang Katzian (born 1956), trade unionist
- Karl Ritter, (DE Wiki) (born 1959), musician and composer
- Thomas Lang (born 1967), musician
- Josef Pröll (born 1968), politician
- Johannes Grenzfurthner (born 1975), artist and filmmaker, grew up locally

=== Sport ===
- Daniela Kix (born 1984), tennis player
- Manuela Zinsberger (born 1995), football goalkeeper, played over 100 games for Austria
- Patrick Greil (born 1996), a footballer who has played over 260 games
- Jon Elliott (born 1976), professional inline skater
