= Kurverein =

In the Late Middle Ages, when the (seven) German prince electors (Kurfürsten) met to elect their king and emperor, their discussions sometimes led to the conclusion of a treaty, which was later called the Kurverein. Such a treaty or alliance therefore contained the rights of the electors and their joint responsibilities in the Holy Roman Empire.

Important Kurvereine were the:

- Declaration of Rhense (Kurverein von Rhense, 16 July 1338)
- Kurverein of Boppard (Kurverein von Boppard, 11 April 1399)
- Kurverein of Mainz (Mainzer Kurverein, 15 September 1399)
- Kurverein of Bingen (Kurverein von Bingen, 17 January 1424)
- Kurverein of Frankfurt (Frankfurter Kurverein, 18 March 1558)

Another Kurverein was agreed out by the Rhenish electors. Their main concerns were agreements for a common set of regulations for navigation on the Rhine and for the Rhine tolls. The first such Kurverein took place with the participation of the three archbishops of Cologne, Mainz and Trier in 1354. At other such meetings, which were more frequent in the fifteenth century and subsequently, they were joined by the Elector of the Palatinate.

== Literature ==
- Malte Prietzel: Das Heilige Römische Reich im Spätmittelalter (= Geschichte kompakt. Mittelalter), Darmstadt, 2004, pp. 60f, 95, 110
