= Hartmann of Brixen =

Blessed Bishop Hartmann of Brixen
- Bishop of Brixen
- Church: Roman Catholic Church
- Diocese: Brixen
- See: Brixen
- Appointed: 1140
- Installed: 1140
- Term ended: 23 December 1164
- Predecessor: Reginberto
- Successor: Ottone VI di Andechs

Orders
- Consecration: 1140

Personal details
- Born: Hartmann; 1090 Passau, Bavaria, Kingdom of Germany
- Died: 23 December 1164 (aged 74) Brixen, Kingdom of Germany

Sainthood
- Feast day: 23 December
- Venerated in: Roman Catholic Church
- Beatified: 11 February 1784; Saint Peter's Basilica, Papal States by Pope Pius VI
- Attributes: Episcopal attire
- Patronage: Brixen; Diocese of Bolzano-Bressanone; Pregnant women

Blessed Hartmann of Brixen (1090 - 23 December 1164) was a German prelate of the Catholic Church, who served as the Bishop of Brixen from his appointment in 1140 until his death. Hartmann served alongside the Order of Saint Augustine - who oversaw his education - and he managed certain aspects of their order despite not being part of that congregation. He also supported Pope Alexander III during his struggle with Frederick Barbarossa and also earned the favor of the latter despite Hartmann's views of the schism.

His beatification was ratified under Pope Pius VI in 1784.

== Life ==
Hartmann was born to Bavarian nobles in Passau in 1090 and received his education at the Saint Nikola convent in Passau under the direction of the Order of Saint Augustine.

Hartmann received his ordination to the priesthood and was appointed as the dean of the Salzburg Cathedral in 1122. It was Salzburg's archbishop Conrad who decided to reform his priests in 1122 and chose Hartmann to lead a group of priests under the rule of Saint Augustine while being made prior of an Augustinian house at Herren-Chiemsee in 1128 and held that position until 1133. Pope Innocent II appointed him as the Bishop of Brixen in 1140 and as such received his episcopal consecration a short while after. He was installed not long after and dedicated himself to the reform of priests in the diocese as well as acting as a benefactor to religious orders with a particular emphasis on the introduction of the Order of Saint Benedict into the diocese. He also made the town of Rodeneck an alod sometime in his tenure as bishop from 1140 to 1147. It was said he wore a cilice under a plain robe instead of full liturgical episcopal garments.

In 1133, Margrave Saint Leopold III called him to lead a group of Augustinians at Klosterneuburg and remained as such until 1140, when he was appointed as a bishop. In 1137, he received a letter from Innocent II confirming papal approval for the group, after it fell under papal protection back in 1134. Bishop Hartmann also earned the favor of Frederick Barbarossa despite the fact that Hartmann supported Pope Alexander III during the schism.

Hartmann died on 23 December 1164 in Brixen.

== Beatification ==
The ratification from Pope Pius VI - on 11 February 1784 - of the late bishop's local 'cultus' (or popular devotion) acted as the formal act of beatification instead of following the normal requirement.
