= Schwangau =

- Municipality
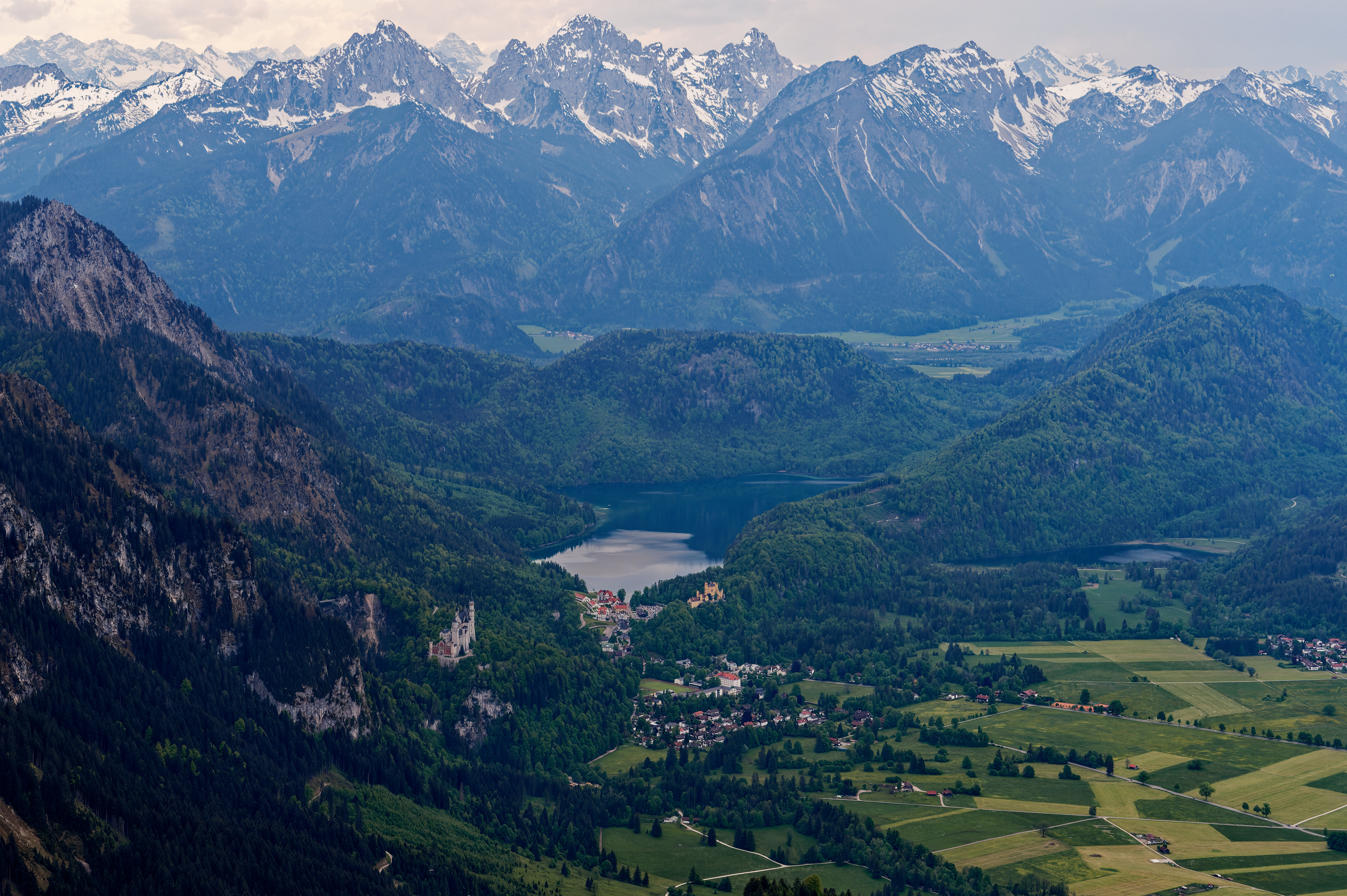
- Neuschwanstein Castle and the village of Schwangau

- Flag Coat of arms

- Location of Schwangau within Ostallgäu district
- Interactive map of Schwangau
- Location within Germany Location within Bavaria
- Coordinates: 47°35′N 10°44′E
- Country: Germany
- State: Bavaria
- Admin. region: Schwaben
- District: Ostallgäu

Government
  - Mayor (2020–26): Stefan Rinke (CSU)

Area
  - Total: 76 km^{2} (29 sq mi)
- Elevation: 796 m (2,612 ft)

Population (2025-12-31)
  - Total: 3,248
  - Density: 43/km^{2} (110/sq mi)
- Time zone: UTC+01:00 (CET)
  - Summer (DST): UTC+02:00 (CEST)
- Postal codes: 87643=57645
- Dialling codes: 08362
- Vehicle registration: OAL
- Website: www.schwangau.de

Schwangau (German pronunciation: [ˈʃvaːnˌɡaʊ̯]) is a municipality in the district of Ostallgäu in Bavaria, Germany. The village lies 4 km from the larger town of Füssen and just 1.5 km from Hohenschwangau, a collection of tourist-oriented facilities adjacent to the major tourist attractions of Neuschwanstein Castle and Hohenschwangau Castle.

Schwangau has no railway station, but is served by buses connecting to Füssen, Hohenschwangau, and other nearby Alpine towns. It is the next-to-last town on the Romantic Road tourist route that terminates in Füssen.

A castrum Swangowe is attested in 1090. It was situated on the site of Neuschwanstein Castle and was owned by the Elder House of Welf. After the death of Welf VI in 1191, it fell to the Staufer dynasty, and in 1268 to the empire. The coat of arms of the municipality is based on the one shown in the Codex Manesse as that of Hiltbolt von Schwangau (d. 1256).

== Education and notable people ==
Gymnasium mit Internat Hohenschwangau is a state high school with an adjoining boarding school. The schools are located at the foot of Neuschwanstein Castle, to the north-east of Hohenschwangau Castle, in the centre of the Ostallgäu lake landscape.

The place is also the location where Heinz Guderian died in 1954 a former World War I veteran soldier and army officer in the German imperial army,Reichsheer who became a infamous Wehrmacht Heer General and a Nazi Commander in the OKH who worked for the Wehrmacht's OKW from 1936–1945 who worked for Hitler from 1936 until the end of World War II in 1945 who was also infamous for the Clean Wehrmacht to promote that he and his troops armies as well as the Wehrmacht Military never committed any war crimes or involvement in the Nazi Holocaust with the SS. The Church of St. Coloman, a baroque church, is nearby.

== Gallery ==
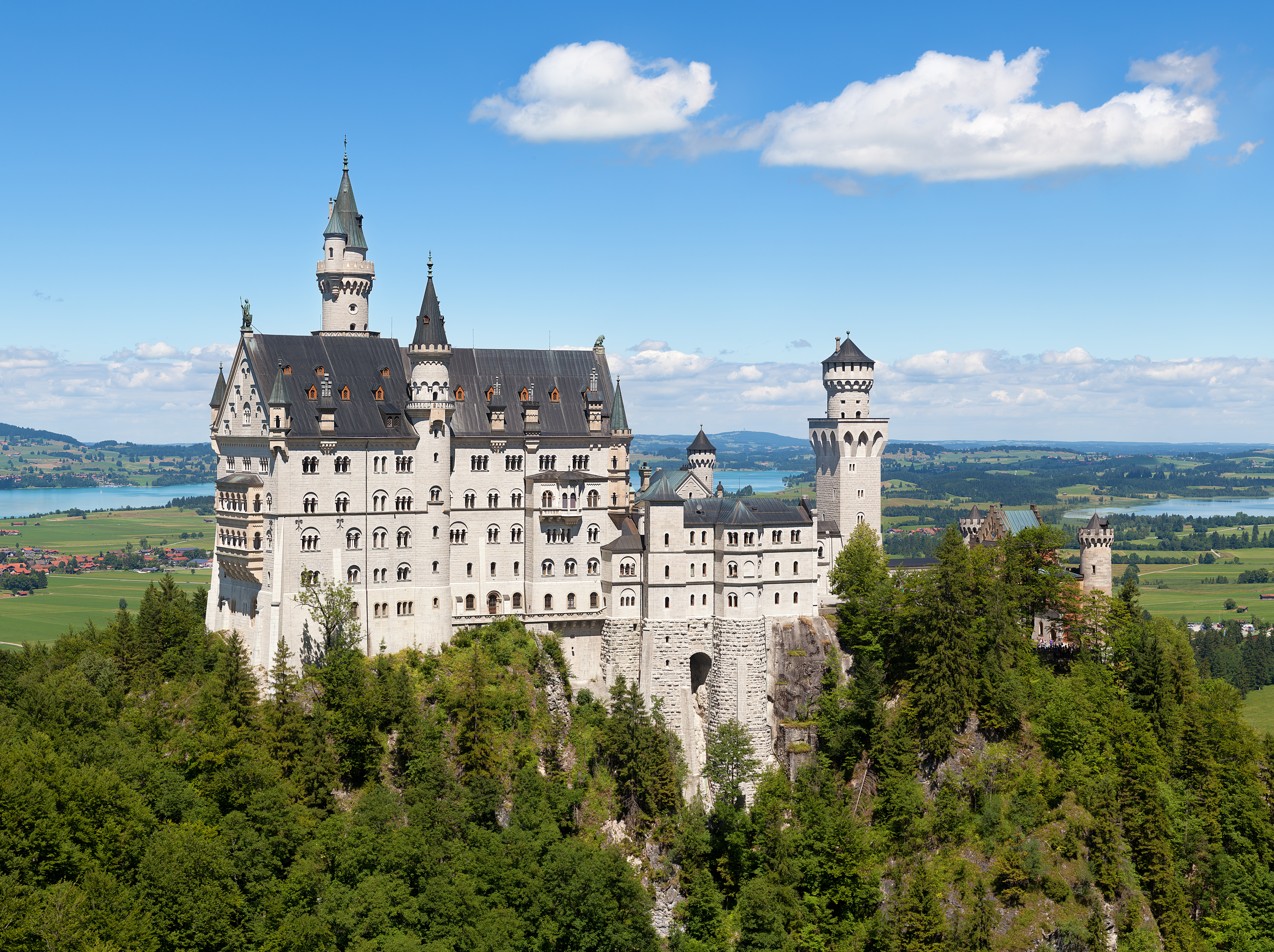
Neuschwanstein Castle

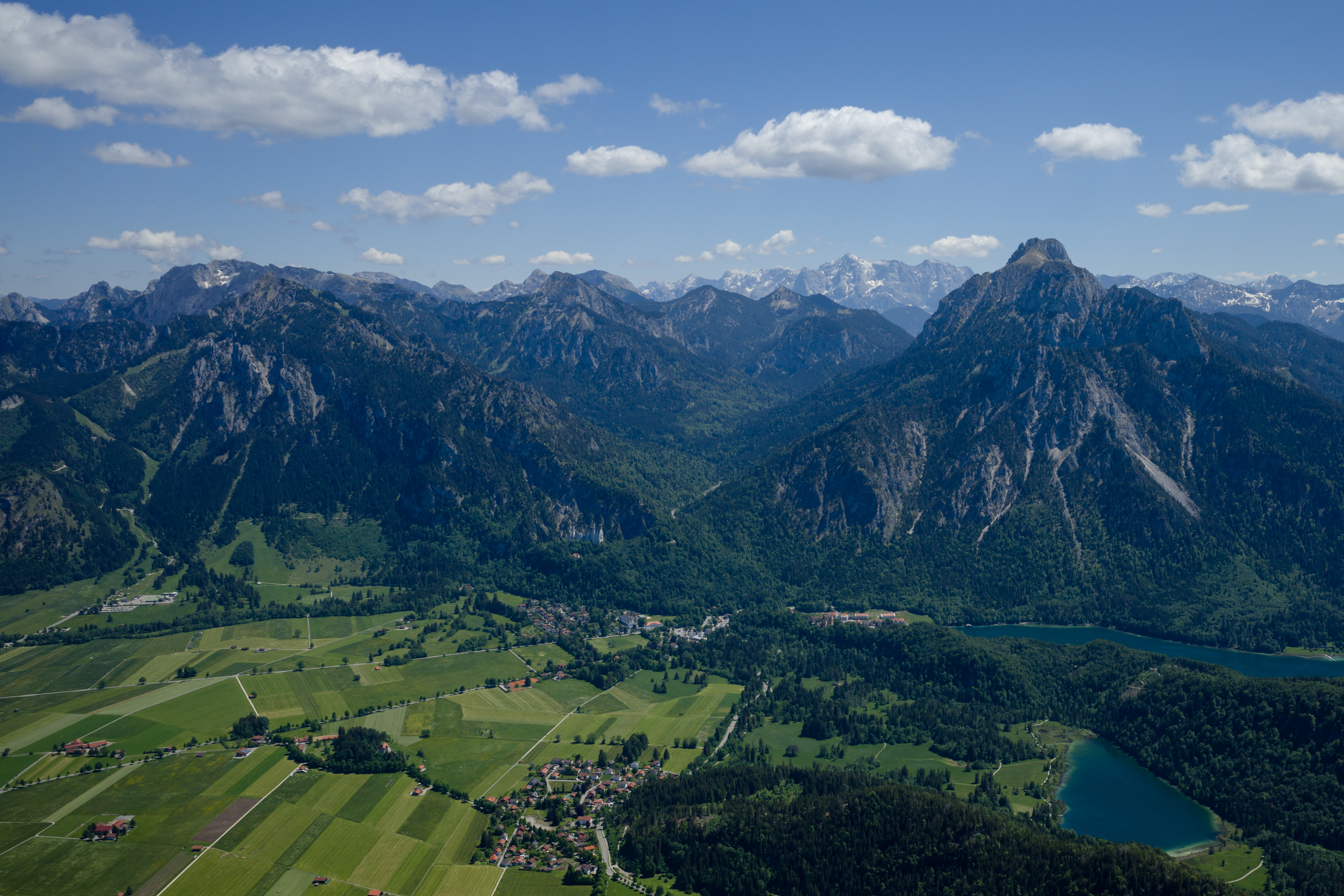
Mountains Tegelberg Säuling, and Zugspitze in the south
