= Vahrn =

- Comune
- Gemeinde Vahrn; Comune di Varna
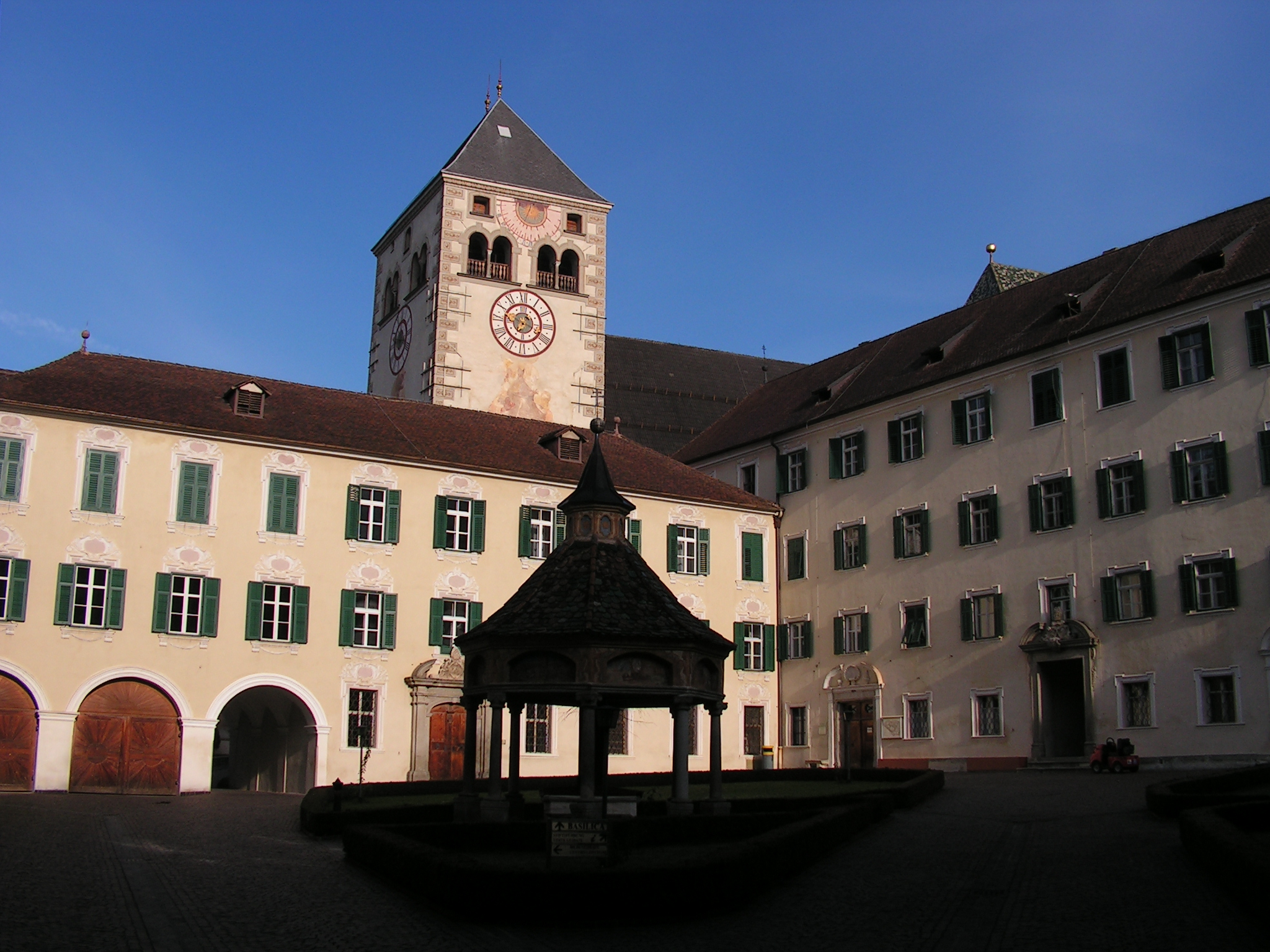
- The court of the Abbey of Neustift in Vahrn

- Location within Italy Location within Trentino-Alto Adige/Südtirol
- Coordinates: 46°45′N 11°38′E
- Country: Italy
- Region: Trentino-Alto Adige/Südtirol
- Province: South Tyrol (BZ)
- Frazioni: Neustift (Novacella)

Government
  - Mayor: Andreas Schatzer

Area
  - Total: 70.1 km^{2} (27.1 sq mi)
- Elevation: 671 m (2,201 ft)

Population (Nov. 2010)
  - Total: 4,231
  - Density: 60.4/km^{2} (156/sq mi)
- Demonym(s): German: Vahrner; Italian: di Varna
- Time zone: UTC+1 (CET)
  - Summer (DST): UTC+2 (CEST)
- Postal code: 39040
- Dialing code: 0472
- Website: Official website

Vahrn (German pronunciation: [ˈfaːɐ̯n]; Italian: Varna [ˈvarna]) is a comune (municipality) in South Tyrol in northern Italy, located about 35 kilometres (22 mi) northeast of the city of Bolzano.

== Geography ==
Vahrn borders the following municipalities: Brixen, Klausen, Franzensfeste, Natz-Schabs, Sarntal and Feldthurns.

=== Frazioni ===
The municipality of Vahrn contains the frazione (subdivision) Neustift (Novacella) and the valley of Schalders (Scaleres).

== History ==
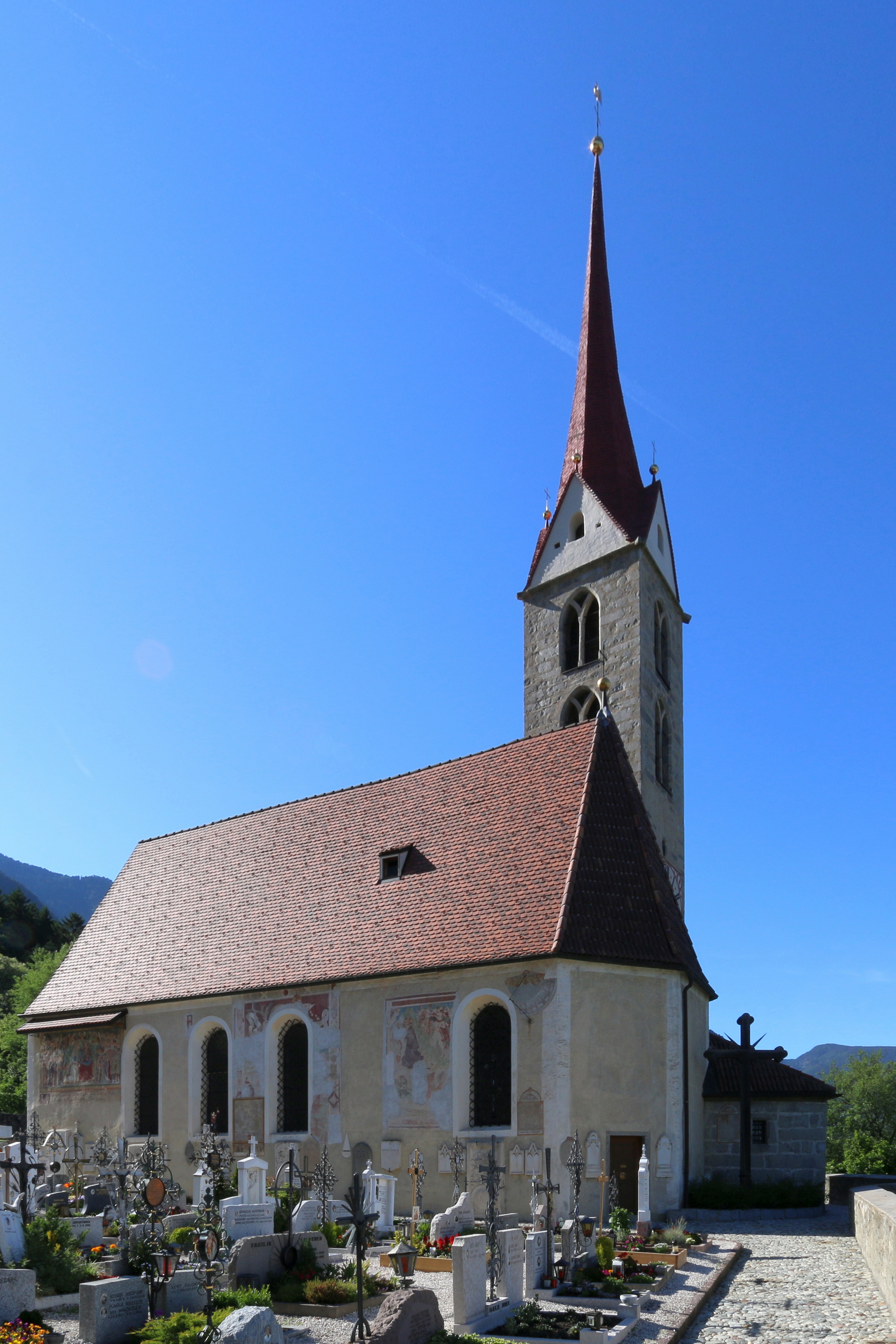
Parish church

=== Coat-of-arms ===
The emblem is quartering: the first and the fourth of argent three fess nebuly azure; the second and the third of gules. It’s the arms of the Knights of Voitsberg which changed the name in Von Vahrn when they acquired the local castle, then destroyed in 1277. The emblem was granted in 1969.

== Society ==
=== Linguistic distribution ===
According to the 2024 census, 83.39% of the population speak German, 15.45% Italian and 1.16% Ladin as first language.

=== Demographic evolution ===
Historical population

Year	Pop.	±%
1921	2,164	—
1931	2,529	+16.9%
1936	2,088	−17.4%
1951	2,076	−0.6%

Year	Pop.	±%
1961	2,268	+9.2%
1971	2,653	+17.0%
1981	3,102	+16.9%
1991	3,269	+5.4%

Year	Pop.	±%
2001	3,577	+9.4%
2004	3,749	+4.8%

Source: Data from ISTAT

== See also ==
- Neustift Abbey, an Augustinian abbey in the municipality
