= Ritten (mountain) =

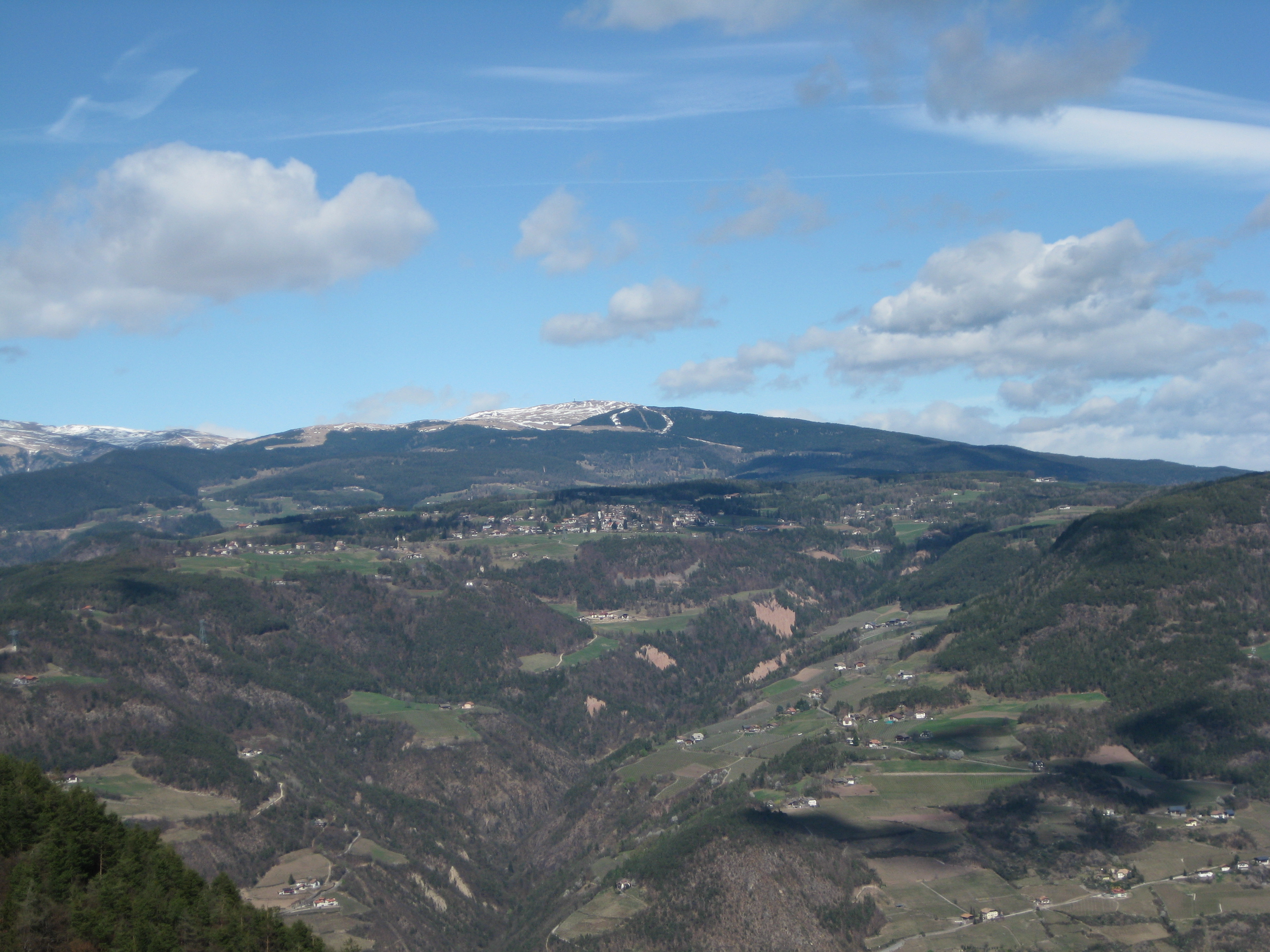
View from the south to the plateau of the Ritten with Rittner Horn in the background

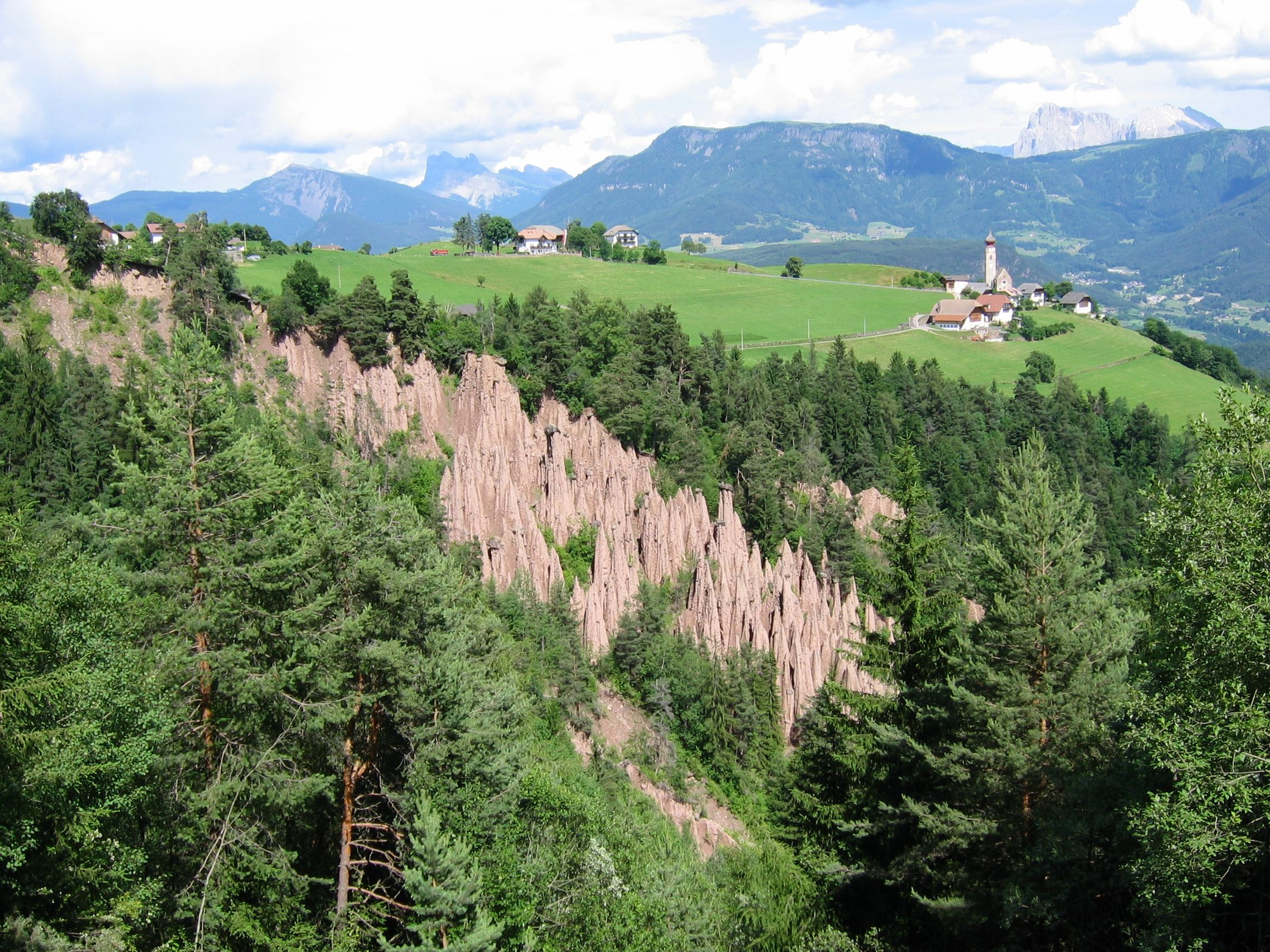
Rittner earth pyramids from the west with the St. Nicholas Chapel and Dolomites

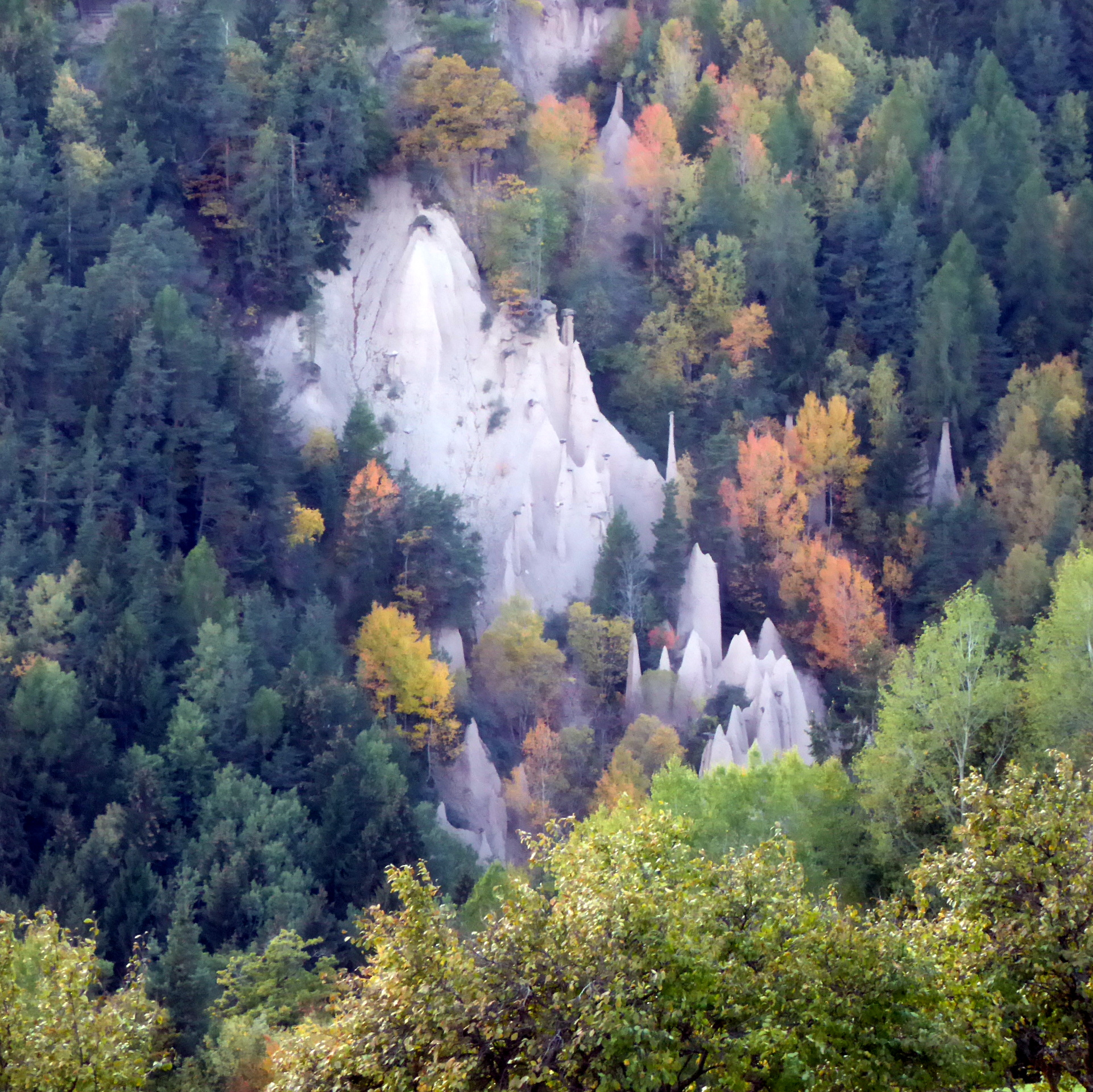
The earth pyramids in autumn viewed from the St. Nicholas Chapel

The Ritten (Italian: Renon) is a mountain ridge in the southeast of the Sarntal Alps in South Tyrol. It is bordered in the west by Sarntal, in the east by Eisacktal and in the south by the Bozner basin. In the north, it is dominated by the Rittner Horn (2,260 m). The approximately 900 to 1,300 m high settlements on the mountain ridge belong to the municipality of the same name Ritten.

== Geography ==
The Ritten belongs together with the Tschögglberg and the Regglberg to the mountain ranges around Bozen of Etschtal volcanic rock (Bozner Quarzporphyr). The present relief of the Ritten was essentially shaped by glacial activity during the Ice Age, which left behind numerous glacial troughs and erratic blocks. The mountain ridge is known for its earth pyramids (e.g. on the Rivelaunbach), slender earth pillars formed by erosion with a capstone.

The Ritten is relatively poor in water due to its geological conditions. Nevertheless, there are a number of ponds (including Wolfsgrubner See) and marshes. The Ritten is characterized by diverse vegetation. In the lower areas of the southern slope above Bozen, sub-Mediterranean mixed coniferous forests dominate, which are characterized by warmth-loving hop-hornbeam and downy oak. At altitudes between 800 and 1,000 m, pine forests adjoin, followed by forests of spruce and stone pine. Prostrate shrubs grow at the highest areas of the ridge near the treeline.

== Settlements ==
The largest villages on the approximately 900 to 1300 m high plateau-like area of the Ritten are Klobenstein, Lengstein, Oberbozen, Oberinn, Unterinn and Wangen, all of which belong to the municipality of Ritten. In addition, numerous smaller hamlets and farmsteads are scattered over the mountain ridge. The settlements of St. Magdalena and St. Justina are considerably lower on the steep slopes above the Bozner valley and lie within the city limits of Bozen.

== Sources ==
- Fritz Dörrenhaus, Hans Becker: Der Ritten und seine Erdpyramiden. Vergleichende Betrachtung der Entstehung von Erdpyramiden in verschiedenen Klimagebieten der Erde. (Kölner geographische Arbeiten 17). Wiesbaden 1966.
- Bruno Mahlknecht: Ritten. Berühmtes Mittelgebirge im Anblick der Dolomiten. Athesia, Bozen 1998, 5. Auflage
