= Durnholzer See =

Lake in South Tyrol, Italy

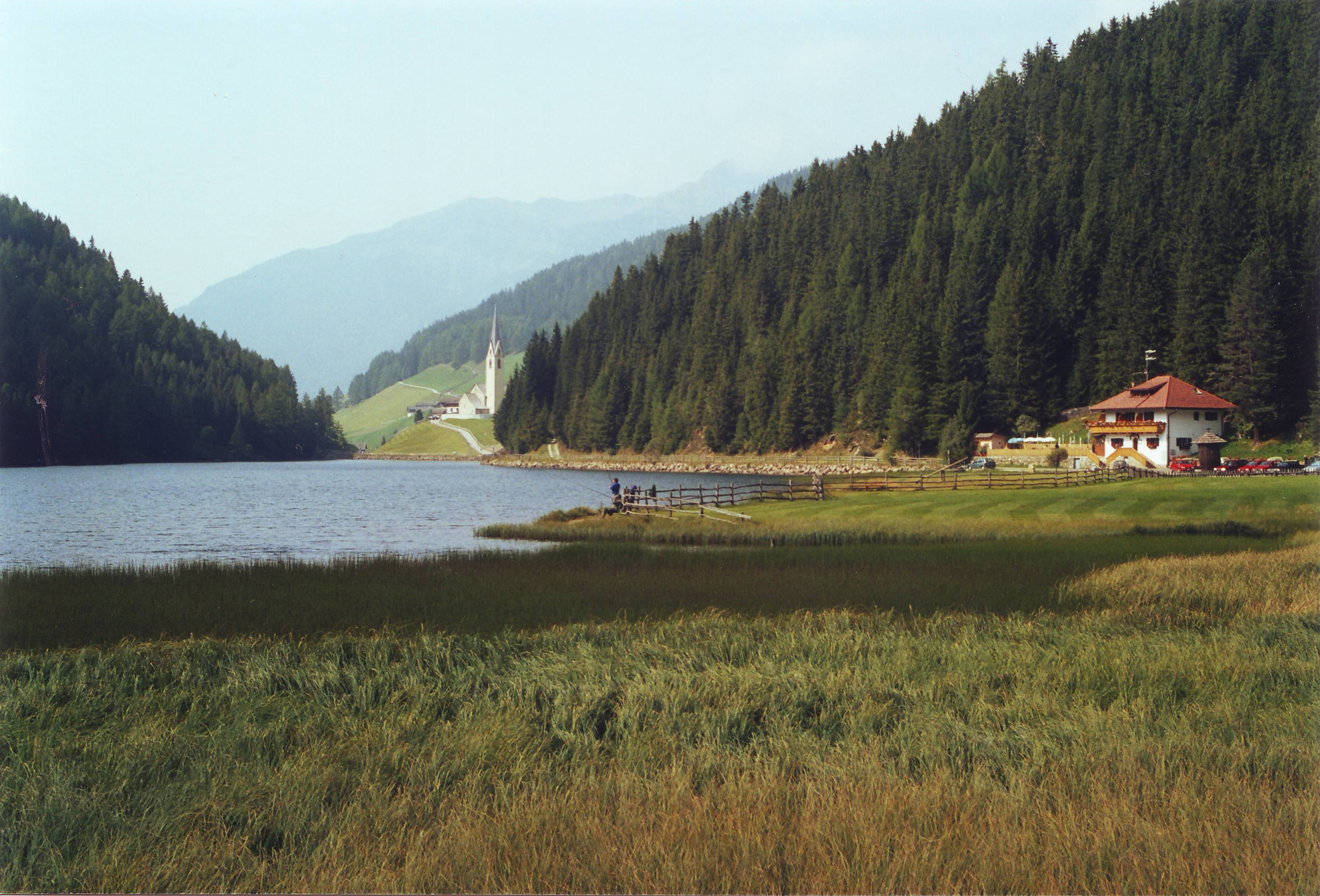

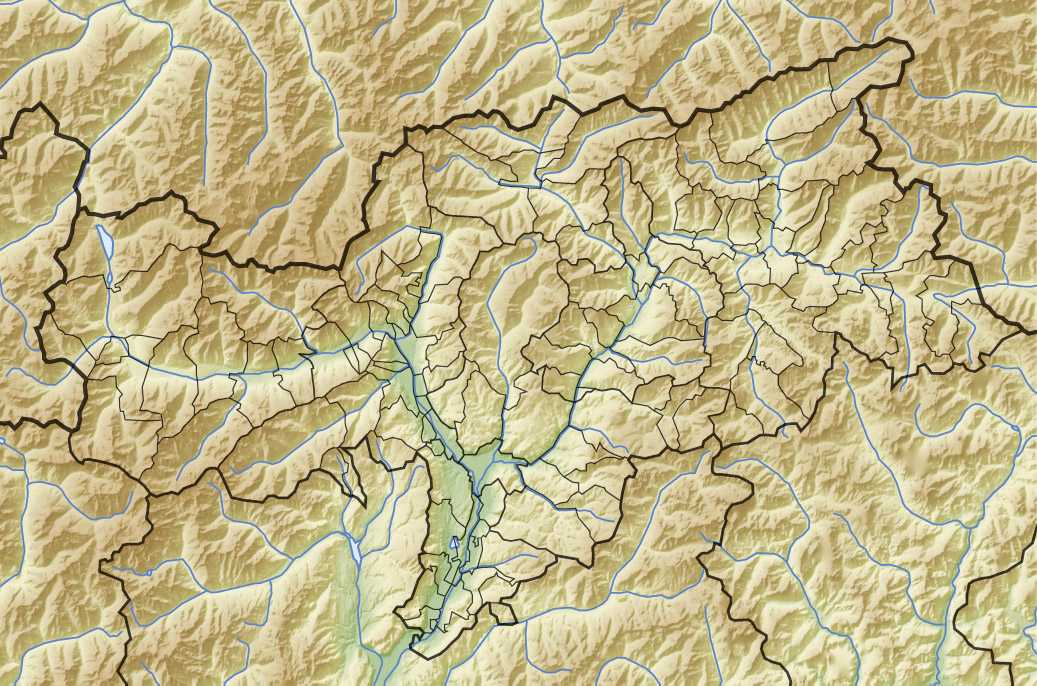
- Location within South Tyrol
- Location: Durnholzer Tal (South Tyrol)
- Coordinates: 46°44′34″N 11°26′37″E
- Primary inflows: Seebach, Großalmbach
- Primary outflows: Durnholzer Bach
- Catchment area: 55.5 km^{2} (21.4 sq mi)
- Basin countries: Italy
- Max. length: 900 m (2,953 ft)
- Max. width: 350 m (1,148 ft)
- Surface area: 12.8 ha (32 acres)
- Max. depth: 12.8 m (42 ft)
- Water volume: 744,000 m^{3} (0.000178 cu mi)
- Surface elevation: 1,545 m (5,069 ft)
- Settlements: Sarntal

The Durnholzer See (Italian: Lago di Valdurna; German: Durnholzer See) is a lake in the Sarntal Alps in South Tyrol, Italy. It belongs to the municipality of Sarntal.
