= Brixen =

Brixen Bressanone Porsenù/Persenon (Ladin)
- Comune
- Gemeinde Brixen; Comune di Bressanone
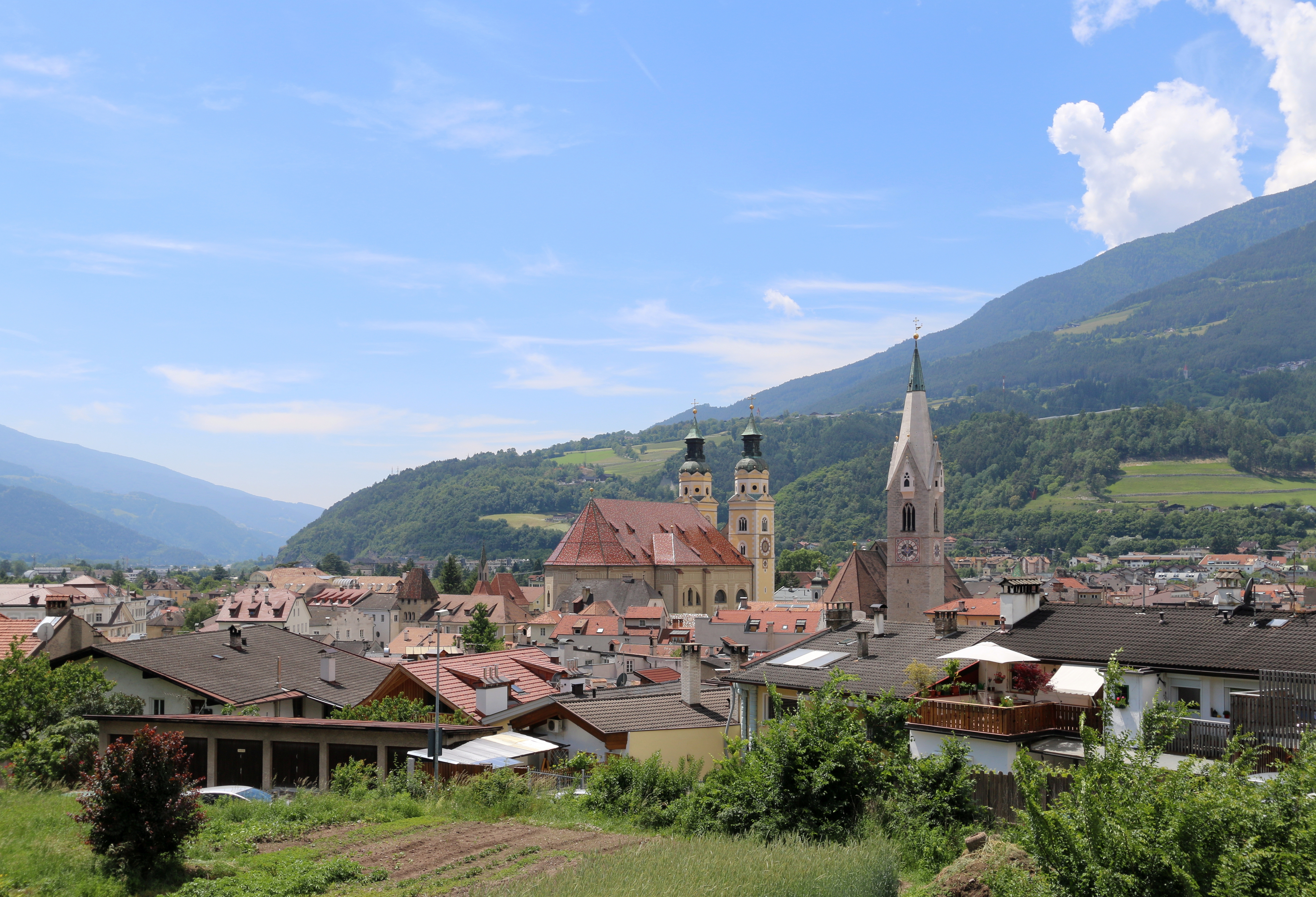
- View of Brixen

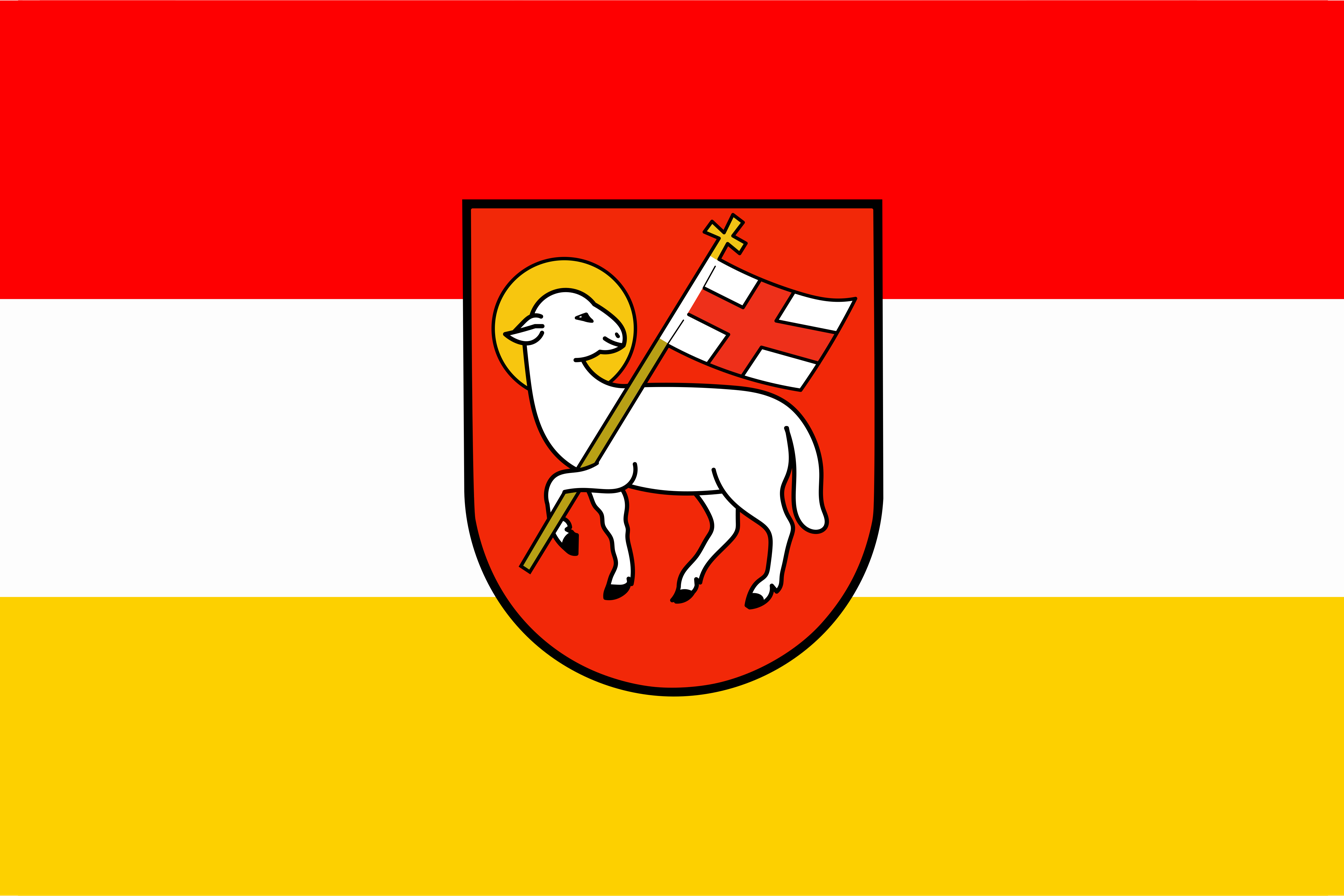
- Flag Coat of arms

- Location within Italy Location within Trentino-Alto Adige/Südtirol
- Coordinates: 46°43′N 11°39′E
- Country: Italy
- Region: Trentino-Alto Adige/Südtirol
- Province: South Tyrol (BZ)
- Frazioni: see list

Government
  - Mayor: Andreas Jungmann (SVP)

Area
  - Total: 84.86 km^{2} (32.76 sq mi)
- Elevation: 560 m (1,840 ft)

Population (31-12-2025)
  - Total: 23,350
  - Density: 275.2/km^{2} (712.7/sq mi)
- Demonyms: German: Brixner; Italian: Brissinesi
- Time zone: UTC+1 (CET)
  - Summer (DST): UTC+2 (CEST)
- Postal code: 39042
- Dialing code: 0472
- ISTAT code: 021
- Patron saint: Saint Albuin; Saint Ingenuin
- Saint day: February 2
- Website: Official website

Brixen (German: [ˈbrɪksn̩]), also known as Bressanone (Italian: [bressaˈnoːne]), is a town and commune in the province of South Tyrol, northern Italy, located about 40 kilometres (25 mi) north of Bolzano.

Brixen is the third-largest city and oldest town in the province, with a population of nearly twenty-three thousand. It is located at the confluence of the Eisack and Rienz rivers, and today it is the capital of the Eisack district community.

== Name and etymology ==
As it is more than 70% German-speaking, the town is usually known in English by its German name, Brixen. It is also known by its Italian name, Bressanone. The municipality is officially bilingual in German and Italian. Ladin is the third-largest and the oldest language spoken in South Tyrol; Brixen is named Porsenù or Persenon (pronounced [pəʀsəˈnɔŋ]) in Ladin.

The reconstruction of Brixen's pre-Roman name has been debated. Some linguists propose a Celtic form *Brigsa or *Brigsina, from the root brig- ('hill, hillfort'). However, the toponym probably first appeared as Pressena in the Quartinus Charter of 828, then as Prihsna in 901, suggesting a possible proto-form *Prixina. According to Diether Schürr, archaeological finds in Stufels (Brixen's early settlement area) point to a Rhaetian rather than Celtic culture in pre-Roman times. While Celts may have renamed the site at some point, Schürr argues, the evidence suggests that the name Brixen could be pre-Celtic in origin.

== Geography ==
The Brenner Pass, on the Italian-Austrian border, is 45 km to the north of Brixen, and Bolzano lies 40 km to the south. To the east lies the Plose mountain massif with three peaks, the closest of which being the Telegraph peak (Monte Telegrafo) (2,486 m), formally known as Fröllspitze. On the western side, there is the Königsangerspitze mountain (Monte Pascolo) (2,439 m) and the Pfeffersberg slope (Monteponente), both of which are located within the Sarntal Alps.

Brixen is especially known for its skiing, with a major ski resort, the Plose.

=== Frazioni ===
Brixen is made up of about 22 smaller villages and hamlets called frazioni. They include: Afers/Eores, Albeins/Albes, Elvas, Gereuth/Caredo, Karnol/Cornale, Klerant/Cleran, Kranebitt/Costa d'Elvas, Mahr/Elvas La Mara, Mairdorf/Villa, Mellaun/Meluno, Milland/Millan, Pairdorf/Perara, Pinzagen/Pinzago, Plabach/Rivapiana, Rutzenberg/Monte Ruzzo, Sarns/Sarnes, St. Andrä/Sant'Andrea, St. Leonhard/San Leonardo, Tils/Tiles, Tötschling/Tecelinga, Tschötsch/Scezze, and Untereben.

== History ==
The area of Brixen has been settled since the Upper Paleolithic (8th millennium BC). Other settlements from the late Stone Age have been found and in 15 BC, the area was conquered by the Romans, who had their main settlement in the nearby Säben (Sabiona). They held it until around 590, when it was occupied by Bavarians.

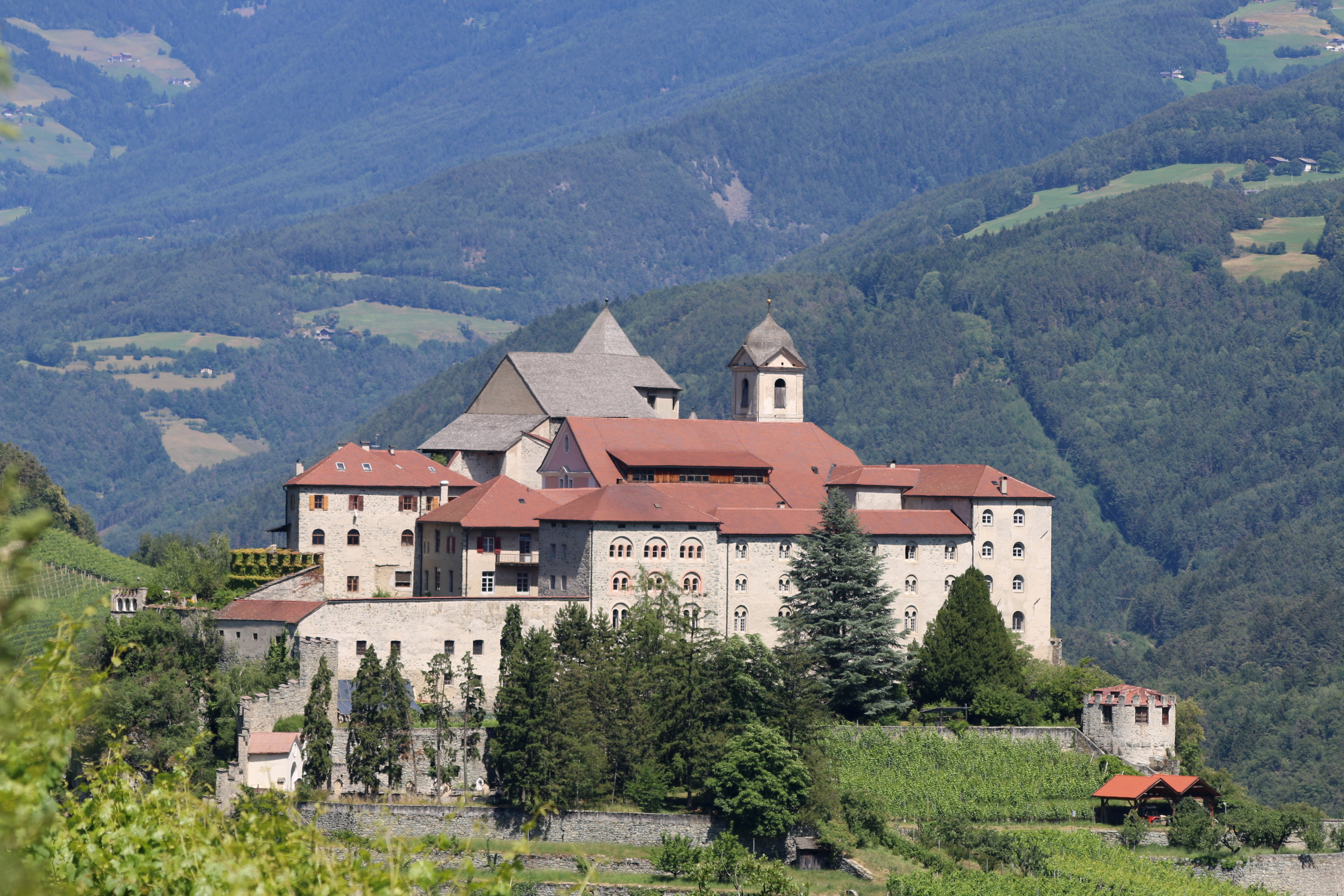
Säben Abbey

The first mention of Brixen dates to 901 in a document issued by the King of Germany, Louis III the Child, in which the farm of Prihsna was presented to Bishop Zacharias of Säben. As time passed, 'Prihsna' turned into the current name of Brixen. The bishops moved here from Säben in 992, after the cathedral had been finished.

In 1048, the Bishop of Brixen, Poppo, was made pontiff as Pope Damasus II by emperor Henry III. His reign was especially short, lasting only 23 days before dying. Rumours circulated that Poppo had been poisoned by Gerhard Brazutus, an ally to both Pope Benedict IX, whom Poppo had just dethroned, and to be Pope Gregory VII. These claims have not proven to be substantial and a modern conjecture suggests he died of malaria.

On 15 June 1080, at the request of Henry III, the synod of Brixen condemned Pope Gregory VII over the Investiture Controversy, a conflict during the 11th and 12th centuries over the ability to appoint bishops.

In 1115, a first line of walls encircling Brixen was completed. In 1174, and later again in 1234 and 1445, Brixen was devastated by fires.

During the German mediatisation in 1802, Brixen was awarded to the Austrian Empire, only to be ceded to the Bavarians in 1805 after the Austrians suffered a great loss to Napoleon and his Allies at the Battle of Austerlitz. The Bavarians set up the District Court of Brixen, a regional judicial and administrative court for South Tyrol. The court lasted only nine years before in 1814, the Congress of Vienna returned Brixen to the Austrians.

Some time between 1851 and 1855, the Czech journalist and writer Karel Havlíček Borovský was exiled to Brixen by the Austrian government.

In 1866, after the Austro-Prussian War, the Austrians were on the verge of collapse. In 1867 the Austro-Hungarian Compromise was arranged. This established a dual monarchy comprising Austria and the Kingdom of Hungary, which were respectively known unofficially as Cisleithania and Transleithania. South Tyrol, including Brixen, was part of Cisleithania.

In 1915, the Treaty of London was concluded. Its objective was, in part, to entice Italy to join the Triple Entente. One provision, Article 4, promised the Italians the largely German-speaking Austrian territory of South Tyrol, which would create a new Italian-Austrian frontier. In 1919, after the victories of the allies, Brixen, along with the rest of South Tyrol, was awarded to Italy by the Treaty of Saint-Germain-en-Laye.

Under Mussolini, Brixen and the surrounding villages experienced an enormous growth, as part of the fascist effort to consolidate territorial subdivisions in the country. In 1928, this included the addition of Milland, Sarns, and Albeins, as well as Elvas and Kranebitt which were annexed from Natz, a neighbouring municipality.

After the Second World War, Austria deemed the post-war treaty to be unsatisfactory, raising The South Tyrolean Question (Die Südtirolfrage). In 1972, South Tyrol, as a part of Trentino-Alto Adige/Südtirol, was eventually granted autonomy.

== Coat-of-arms ==
The oldest coat of arms dates back to 1297 with the lamb, known then from 1304 as a symbol of the lamb. On 13 November 1928, a shield with the city walls and a gate on the lawn in the upper half and the lamb in the lower was adopted. The emblem is a turned argent lamb with an or halo on a gules background; the right foreleg supports a flag with a gules cross. The emblem was granted in 1966.

== Main sights ==
- The Cathedral (10th century), dedicated to the Assumption of Mary, was rebuilt in the 13th century and again in 1745–54 along Baroque lines. The ceiling of the nave has a large fresco by Paul Troger portraying the Adoration of the Lamb.
- The Hofburg, a Renaissance Bishop's Palace (started in the 13th century), one of the main noble residences in South Tyrol. The Diocesan Museum has several artworks, including a presepe with 5,000 figures created for Bishop Karl Franz Lodron.
- The round parish church of Saint Michael (11th century). The Gothic choir and the bell tower are from the 15th century while the nave is from the 16th. The main artwork is a wooden Cireneus from the 15th century.
- The Pharmacy Museum (Pharmaziemuseum Brixen), located in a nearly 500-year-old townhouse, shows the development and changes of the local pharmacy. The Peer family (now the 7th generation) has run this pharmacy since 1787, always in the same location. The museum's carefully restored rooms illustrate the development of the pharmaceutical profession over the centuries and the changes in remedies used, from the testicles of a beaver and pieces of an ancient Egyptian mummy to modern plasters and lyophilisates. All the objects and medicines on display were in use over the centuries. The museum also has a library for historical research and the archive of the Peer family. In a separate room there is a multimedia display of the history of the family.
- The White Tower (also known as "Weißer Turm") was completed in 1591, but subsequently modified. The 72-meter-tall tower, which is located next to the parish church of Saint Michael, is inside the city walls in the historic center of Brixen. It contains a complex carillon mechanism of 43 bells, which ring every day at 11:00 a.m. and can play more than a hundred different tunes. On the top floor there is a large roof where it is possible to observe the surroundings. The Tower also has a lunar clock. The tower's Gothic Architecture is one of the few remaining in South Tyrol. It is the cultural heritage monument with the number 14186 in South Tyrol. The White Tower is in use as a museum since 2007.

Outside the city is Rodeneck Castle, one of the most powerful of its time. It has precious frescoes from the early 13th century. Also important are Reifenstein Castle and Trostburg Castle in Waidbruck. In the latter lived the adventurer and minstrel Oswald von Wolkenstein.

=== Gallery ===
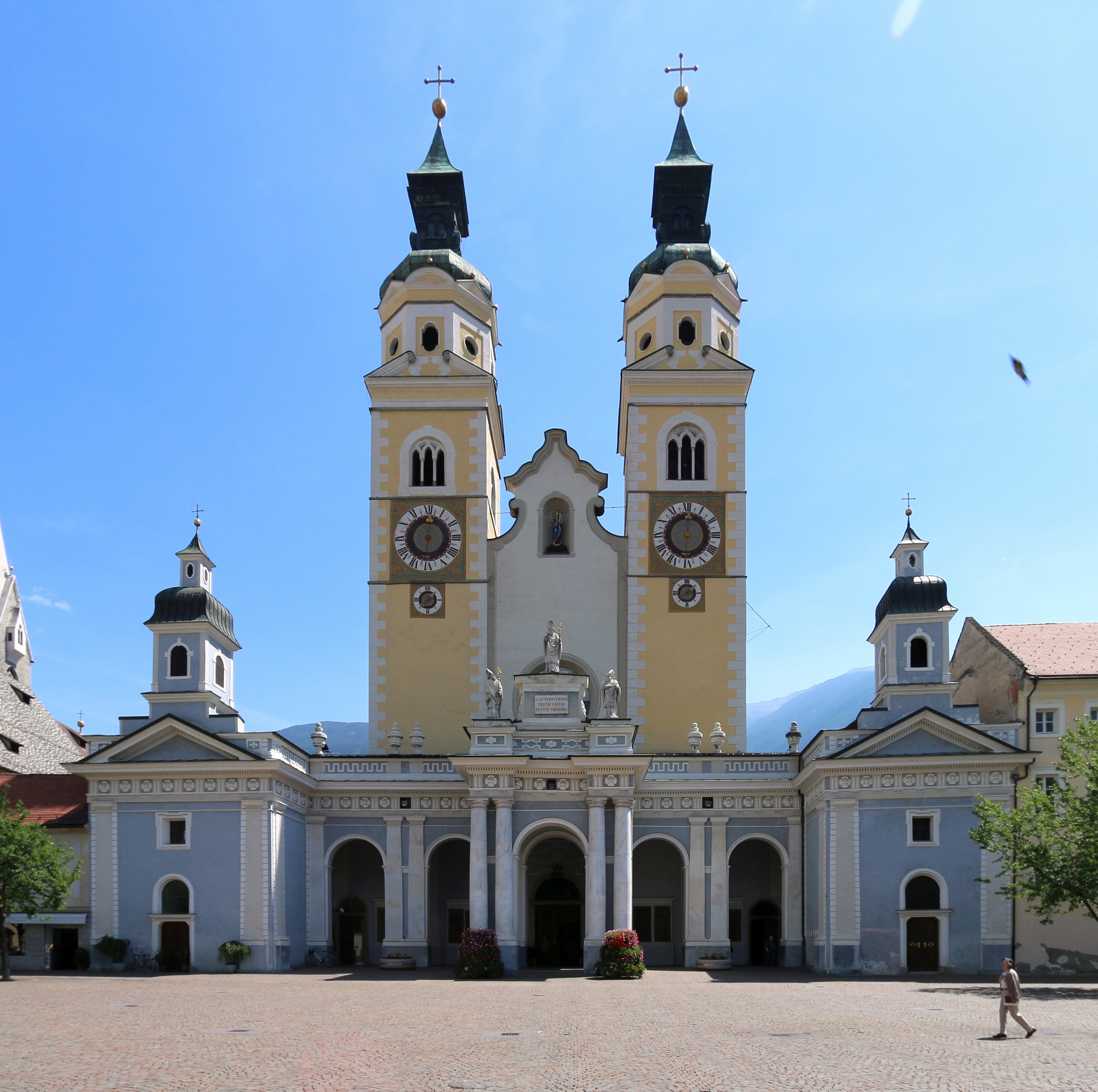
Cathedral of Brixen (outside)

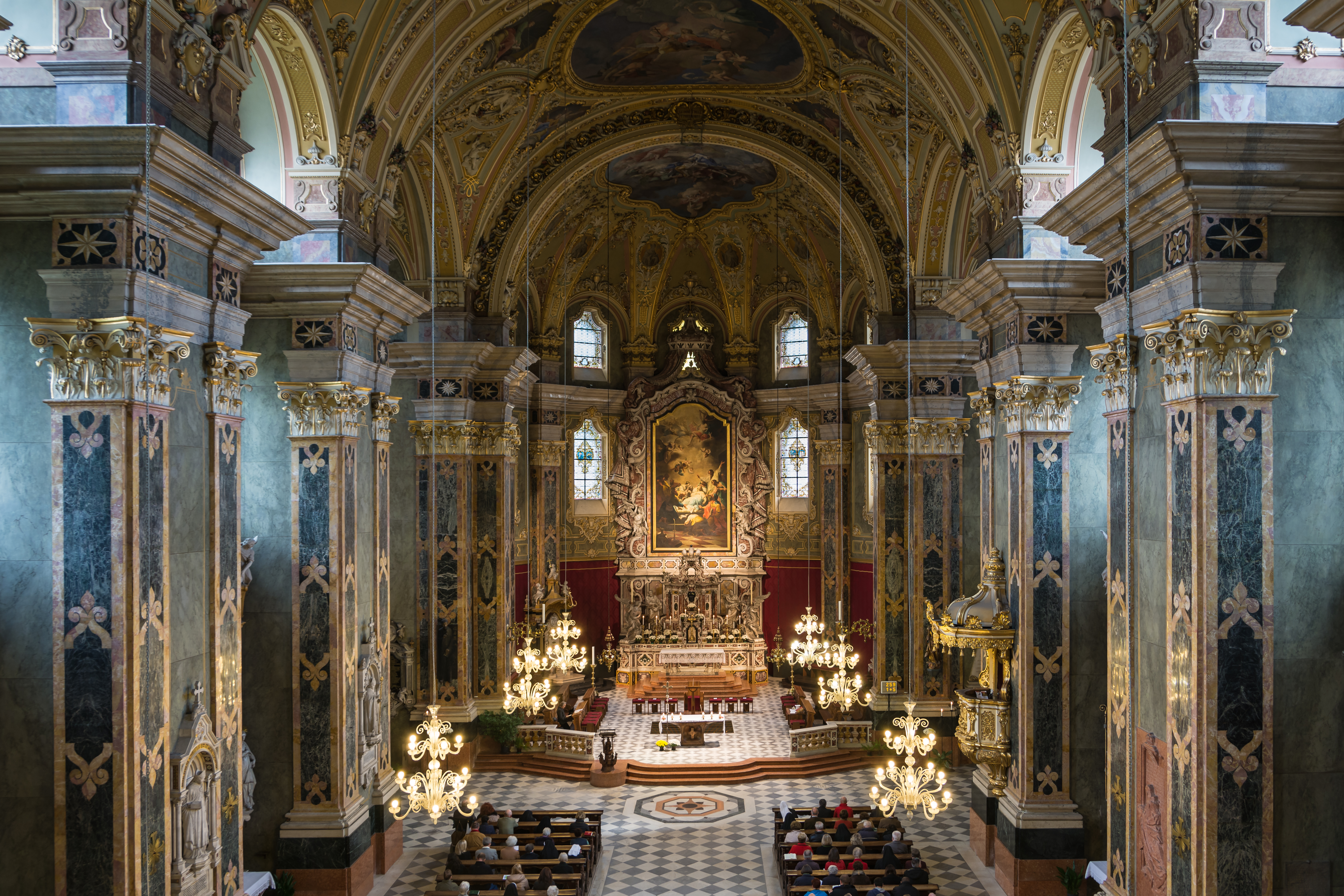
Cathedral of Brixen (inside)

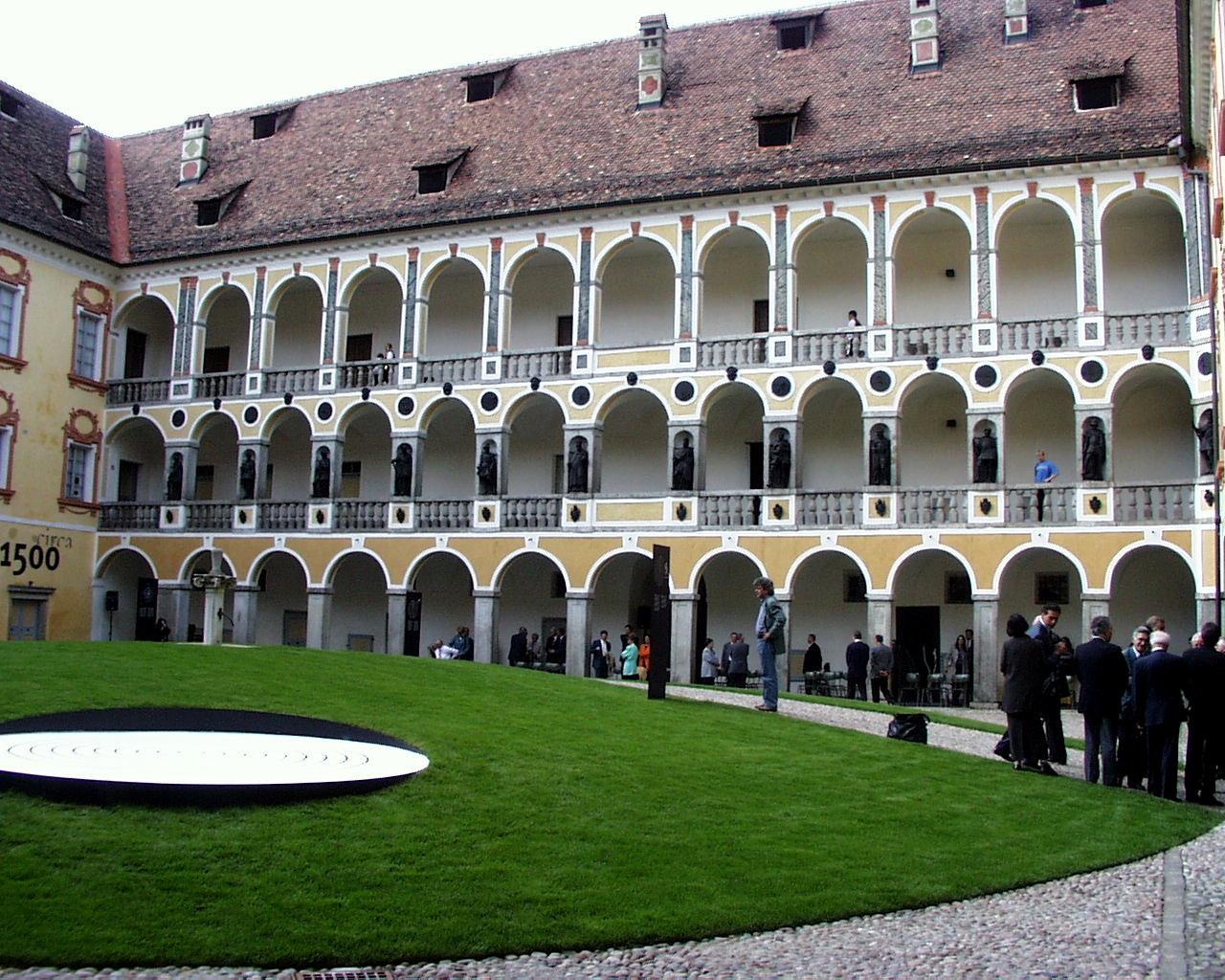
Hofburg Brixen

== Society ==
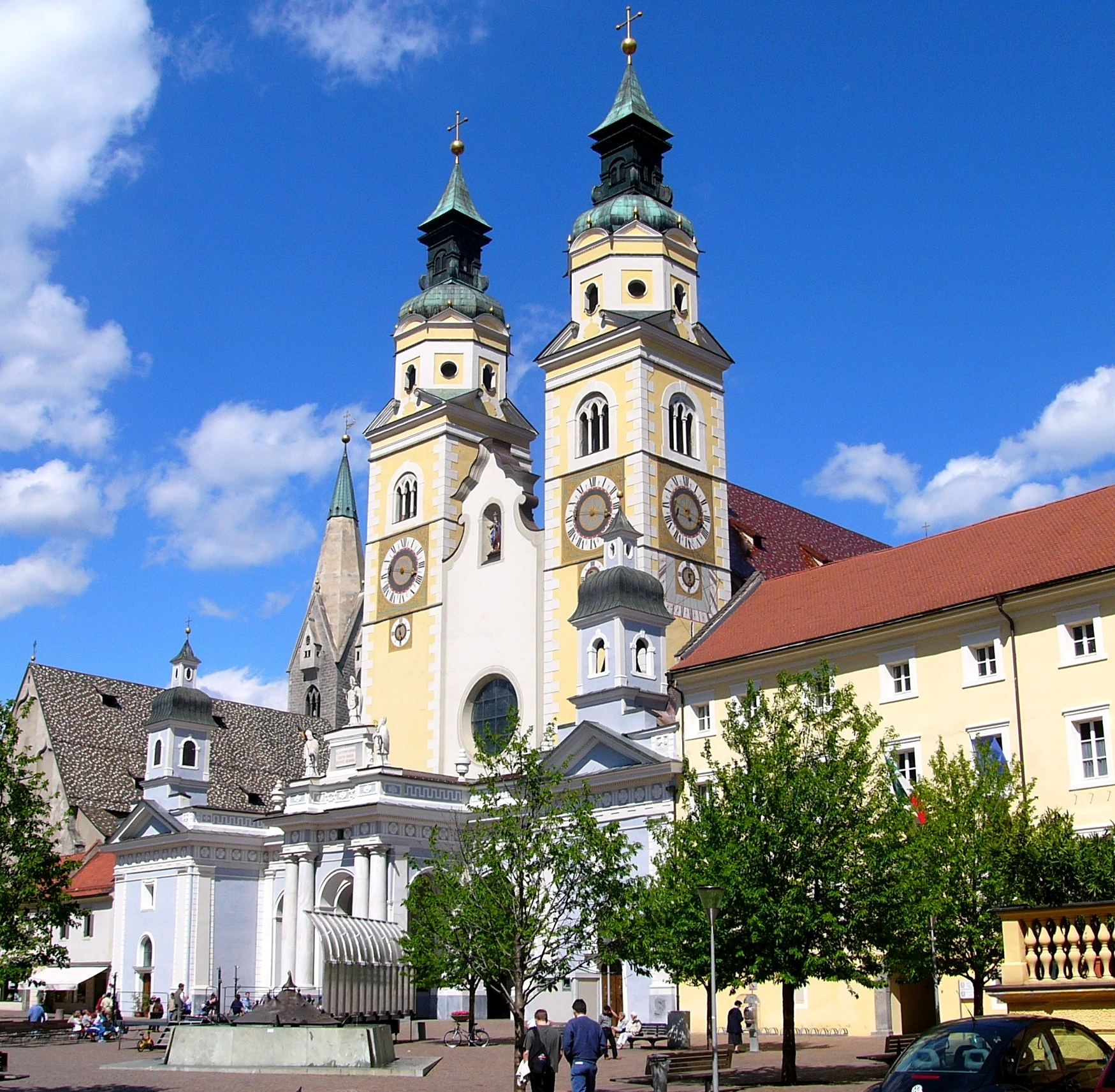
Cathedral of Brixen

=== Linguistic distribution ===
According to the 2024 census, the majority of the population speaks German as first language (72.61%). The remainder of the inhabitants speak Italian and Ladin as first languages, with percentages of 26.03% and 1.36%, respectively.

Year	German	Italian	Ladin
1971	64.86%	34.32%	0.82%
1981	70.32%	28.40%	1.29%
1991	71.68%	27.03%	1.29%
2001	73.13%	25.65%	1.23%
2011	72.82%	25.84%	1.34%
2024	72.61%	26.03%	1.36%

== Culture ==
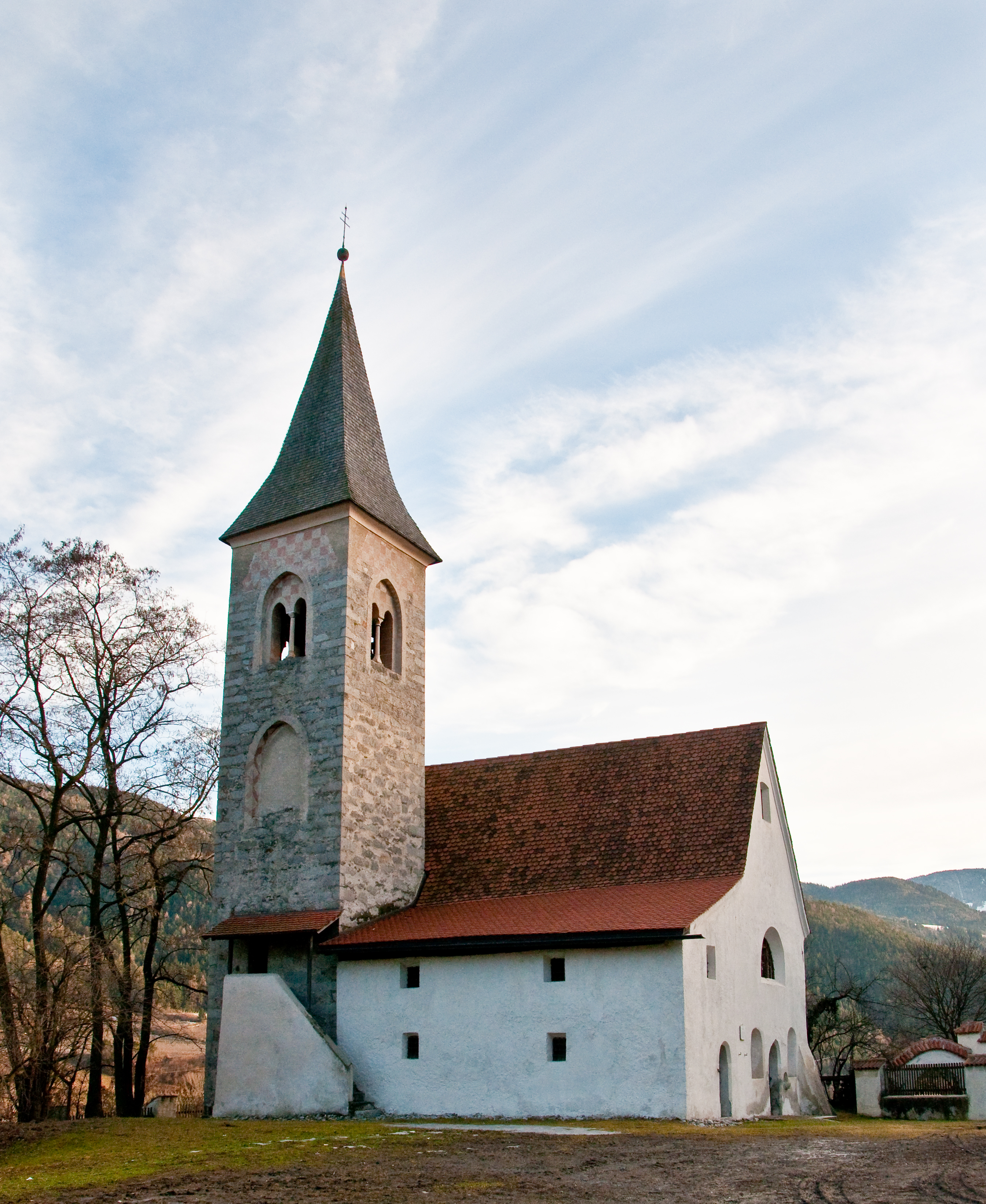
St Jacob Church

The rock band, Frei.Wild, has its origin in Brixen.

== Notable people ==
- Maria Hueber (1653–1705) – religious sister, pioneer in educating girls in Tyrol
- Matteo Goffriller (1659–1742) – Venetian luthier, particularly noted for the quality of his cellos
- Anton Pichler (1697–1779) – Tyrolean goldsmith and artist of engraved gems
- Joseph Ambrose Stapf (1785–1844) – professor of moral theology and pedagogy at Brixen seminary
- Jakob Philipp Fallmerayer (1790–1861) – traveller, journalist, politician and historian
- Johanna von Isser Großrubatscher (1802–1880) – graphic artist and writer
- Josef Murr (1864–1932) – classical philologist and botanist
- Eduard Thöny (1866–1950) – caricaturist and illustrator
- Fritz Tarbuk von Sensenhorst (1896–1976) – lieutenant in the Austro-Hungarian Navy, captain in the army and an entrepreneur
- Mary de Rachewiltz (1925–2026) – poet and translator
- Reinhold Messner (born 1944) – mountaineer, adventurer, explorer, author and politician
- Heinz Winkler (1949–2022) – three-Michelin star chef
- Herbert Dorfmann (born 1969) – agronomist and Member of the European Parliament

=== Sport ===
- Denise Karbon (born 1980) – World Cup alpine ski racer
- Roland Fischnaller (born 1980) – snowboarder at the 2002, 2006, 2010, 2014, 2018 and 2022 Winter Olympics
- Karin Oberhofer (born 1985) – biathlete, bronze medallist in the Mixed relay at the 2014 Winter Olympics
- Ludwig Rieder (born 1991) – luger, competitor at the 2014 Winter Olympics
- Dominik Fischnaller (born 1993) – luger, bronze medallist at the 2022 Winter Olympics
- Kevin Fischnaller (born 1993) – luger, competitor at the 2018 Winter Olympics
- Andrea Isufaj (born 1999) – footballer
- Eva Schatzer (born 2005) - footballer

== Transport ==
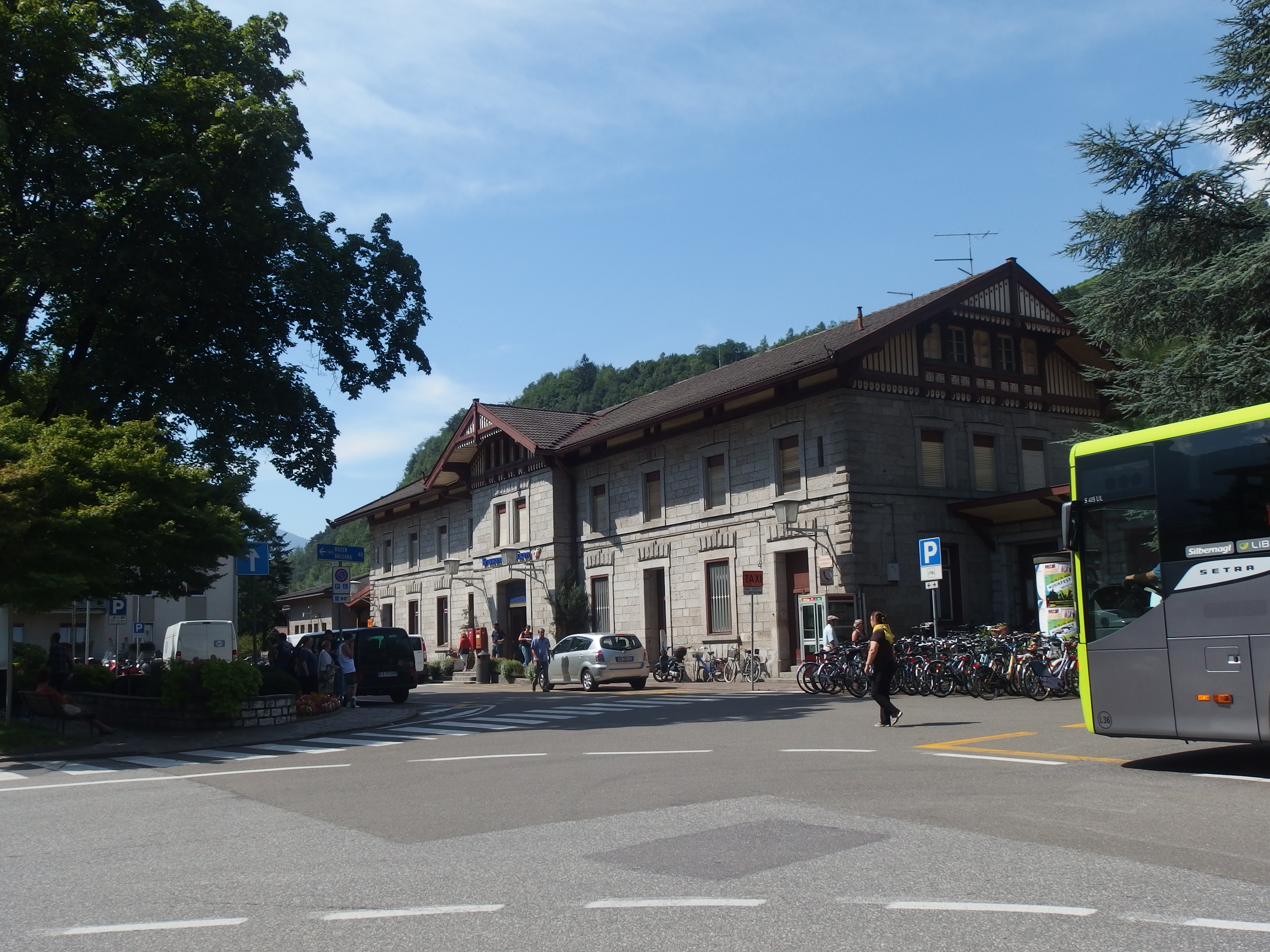
Brixen railway station

Brixen has a railway station on the Brenner Railway, which connects the town to Verona and Innsbruck. It has an individual fare structure for public transport within the Tirol-Südtirol zone.

Italy

- Regional Train (Trenitalia Regional): Brennero/Brenner – Fortezza/Franzensfeste – Bressanone/Brixen – Chiusa/Klausen – Bolzano/Bozen – Trento – Rovereto – Verona – Isola della Scala – Nogara – Bologna

Germany/Austria/South Tyrol

(D for Germany, A for Austria)

On 11 December 2016, ÖBB took over Deutsche Bahn's night trains. The Munich-Milan service was withdrawn.

- Night Train (DB CityNightLine) Munich-Milan/Rome: Munich (D) – Kufstein (A) – Jenbach (A) – Innsbruck (A) – Brixen/Bressanone – Bolzano/Bozen – Trento/Trient – Verona – Peschiera del Garda – Brescia – Milan
- Intercity Train (ÖBB Eurocity) Munich-Verona/Venice: Munich (D) – Kufstein (A) – Jenbach (A) – Innsbruck (A) – Brenner/Brennero – Franzensfeste/Fortezza – Brixen/Bressanone – Bolzano/Bozen – Trento – Rovereto – Verona – Padua – Venice
- Intercity Train (ÖBB Eurocity) Munich-Verona/Bologna: Munich (D) – Kufstein (A) – Jenbach (A) – Innsbruck (A) – Brenner/Brennero – Franzensfeste/Fortezza – Brixen/Bressanone – Bolzano/Bozen – Trento – Rovereto – Verona – Bologna
- Regional Train (Südtirol Bahn Regio-Express) Bolzano/Bozen-Innsbruck: Bolzano/Bozen – Brixen/Bressanone – Franzensfeste/Fortezza – Sterzing/Vipiteno – Brenner/Brennero – Innsbruck
- Regional Train (Südtirol Bahn Regio) Brixen/Bressanone-Lienz: Brixen/Bressanone – Franzensfeste/Fortezza – Mühlbach/Rio di Pusteria – Vintl/Vandoies – Ehrenburg/Casteldarne – St. Lorenzen/San Lorenzo di Sebato – Bruneck/Brunico – Olang/Valdaora – Welsberg/Monguelfo – Niederdorf/Villabassa – Toblach/Dobbiaco – Innichen/San Candido – Lienz (A)
- Train connects at Verona with ÖBB EuroNight Rome-Vienna: DB CityNightLine splits into two trains (first half couples with ÖBB Rome-Vienna and leaves for Vienna or Rome; second half continues to Munich or Milan). Vienna-Rome splits into two trains (first half continues to Rome or Vienna; second half couples with DB CityNightLine for Milan or Munich).

By road, the town has two exits on the Brenner Autobahn that connects Brixen to the Brenner Pass.

== Twin towns – sister cities ==
Brixen is twinned with:

- Bled, Slovenia, since 2004
- Havlíčkův Brod, Czech Republic, since 1992
- Regensburg, Germany, since 1969

== Sports ==
- Brixen hosted the 2009 World Youth Championships in Athletics.
- Brixen hosted the 16th Unicycle World Convention and Championships (UNICON) in July 2012.
