= Penser Weißhorn =

Mountain in Italy

- Corno Bianco
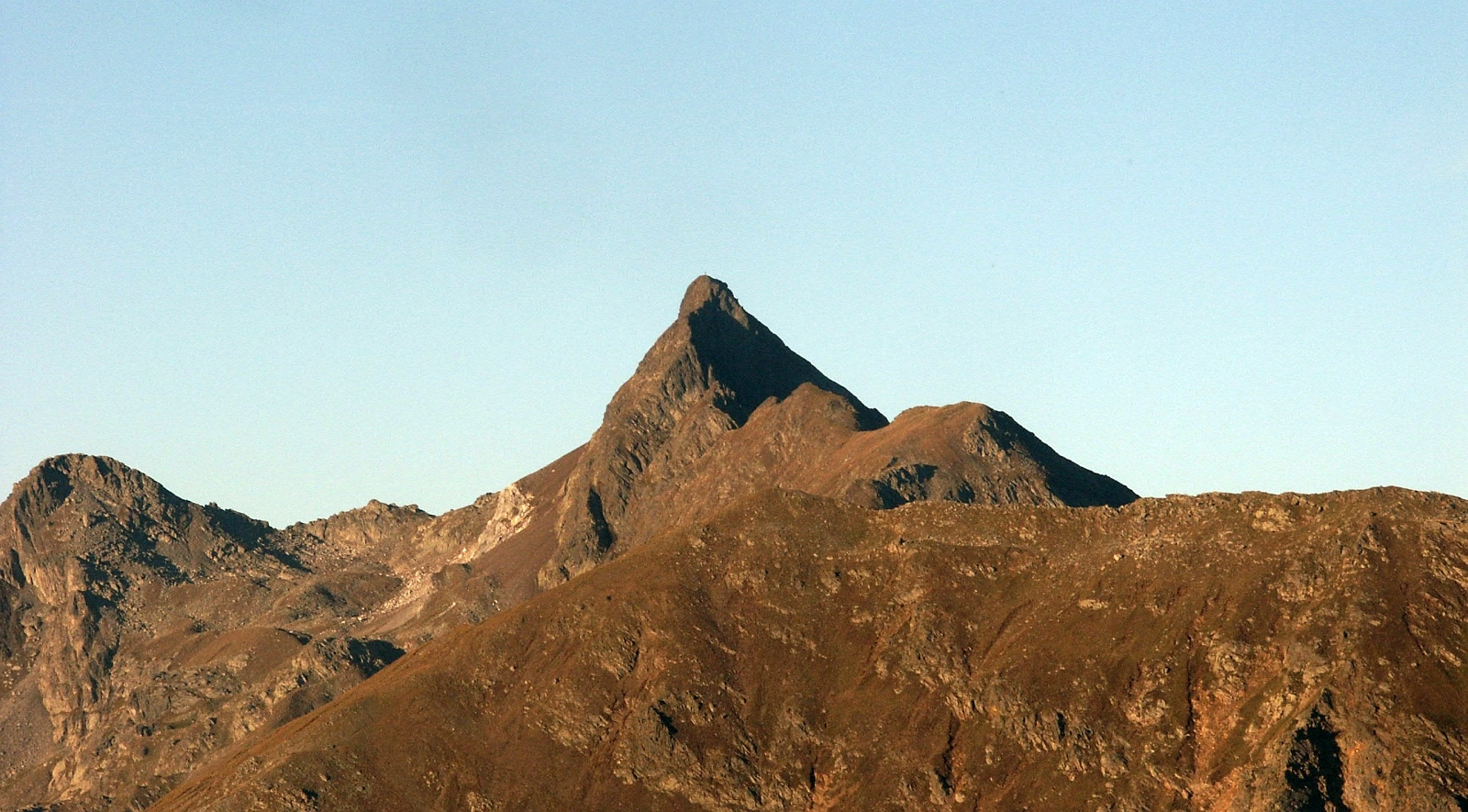
- The Penser Weißhorn

Highest point
- Elevation: 2,705 m (8,875 ft)
- Listing: Alpine mountains 2500-2999 m
- Coordinates: 46°48′10″N 11°23′50″E

Geography
- Location within Alps
- Location: South Tyrol, Italy
- Parent range: Sarntal Alps

The Penser Weißhorn (Italian: Corno Bianco; (also known as the Sarner Weißhorn)) is a mountain of the Sarntal Alps in South Tyrol, Italy. Located near the Penser Joch, its summit appears almost inaccessible due to its seemingly vertical pyramidal shape, although it is a popular location for hikers, and can be climbed by the sure footed in around two hours as a mini via ferrata has been established on its south face. The view from the summit takes in the whole of the Sarntal Alps.
