= Kassian =

Kassian is a given name and surname, a variant of Cassian. Notable people with the name include:

- Kassian Cephas, first indigenous photographer from Indonesia
- Kassian Bogatyrets (1868–1960), Eastern Orthodox priest, church historian, and Rusyn community leader in Bukovina
- Kassian Lauterer, Austrian Roman Catholic priest

- Dennis Kassian, Canadian ice hockey player
- Ed Kassian, Canadian ice hockey player
- Matt Kassian, Canadian ice hockey player
- Zack Kassian, Canadian ice hockey player

== See also ==
- Kassianspitze, part of the Sarntal Alps mountain range in Italy
