= Rittner =

Rittner is a surname. Notable people with the surname include:

- Barbara Rittner (born 1973), German tennis player
- Don Rittner, American historian, archeologist, environmental activist, educator and author
- Günter Rittner (1927–2020), German painter and illustrator
- Horst Rittner (1930–2021), German correspondence chess grandmaster
- Rudolf Rittner (1869–1943), German actor
- Tadeusz Rittner (1873–1921), Polish dramatist, prose writer and literary critic
- British Army Major T. H. Rittner, who was in charge of the German nuclear scientists interned at Farm Hall.

See also

- Rittner Horn, Mountain in South Tyrol, Italy
