= Villanderer Berg =

Mountain in Italy

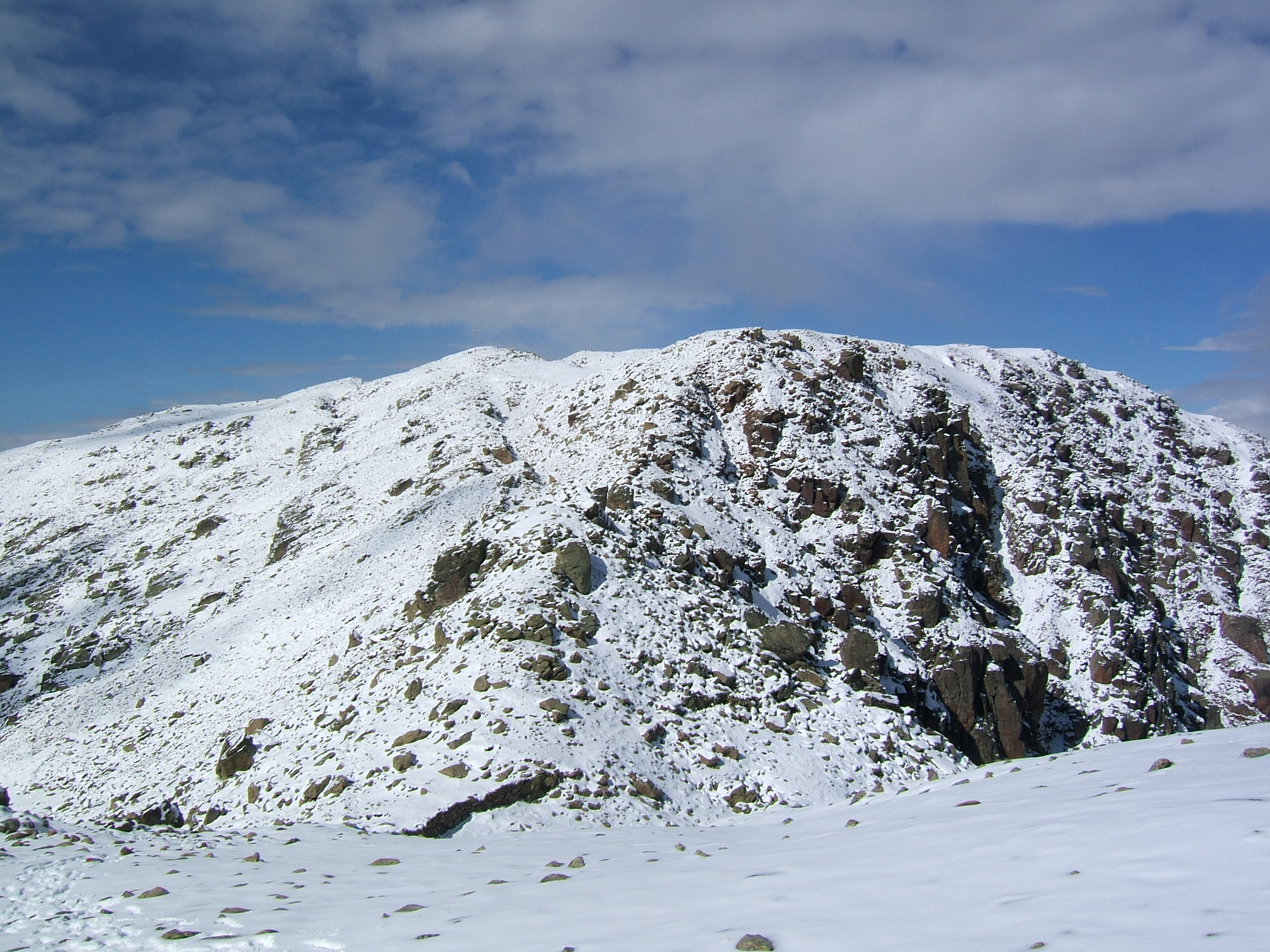

Highest point
- Elevation: 2,509 m (8,232 ft)
- Listing: Alpine mountains 2500-2999 m
- Coordinates: 46°39′31″N 11°25′20″E

Geography
- Location: South Tyrol, Italy
- Parent range: Sarntal Alps

The Villanderer Berg (Italian: Monte Villandro) is a mountain in the Sarntal Alps in South Tyrol, Italy. It has an elevation of 2,509 meters (8,232 feet) above sea level. The mountain is situated between the municipalities of Sarentino and Villandro in the Province of Bolzano.
