= Cassian =

Cassian may refer to:

== People ==
=== Historical ===
- St. Cassian of Imola (4th-century–363), Christian martyr
- St. Cassian of Autun (died 350), Christian bishop of Autun
- St. John Cassian the ascetic (360–435), French Christian saint and author
- St. Marcellus the Centurion, martyr of Tingis, sometimes called "Cassian"
- Cassian Sakowicz (1578–1647), Orthodox activist and, later, a Catholic theologian, writer, and polemicist
- Cassian of Tangier (3rd-century–298), Christian saint

=== Modern ===
- Cassian Elwes (born 1959), British film producer
- Cassian (Yaroslavsky) (1899–1990), Russian Orthodox bishop

=== Surname ===
- Ed Cassian (1867–1918), former Major League Baseball player
- George Cassian, (1932-1979) Canadian yacht designer
- Nina Cassian (1924–2014), Romanian writer
- Brigant Cassian (1889–1957), priest and education worker in Hong Kong

=== Fictional characters ===
- Cassian Andor, a character in the Star Wars franchise
- Cassian, a character in Sarah J. Maas's book series A Court of Thorns and Roses

== Places ==
- Cassian, Wisconsin, U.S.
- Cassian River, Quebec, Canada

== Other uses ==
- Cassian (stage), a geochronologic name in Italian stratigraphy
- Sabinian school, known as the Cassians

== See also ==
- Kassian
