= Tagewaldhorn =

Mountain in Italy

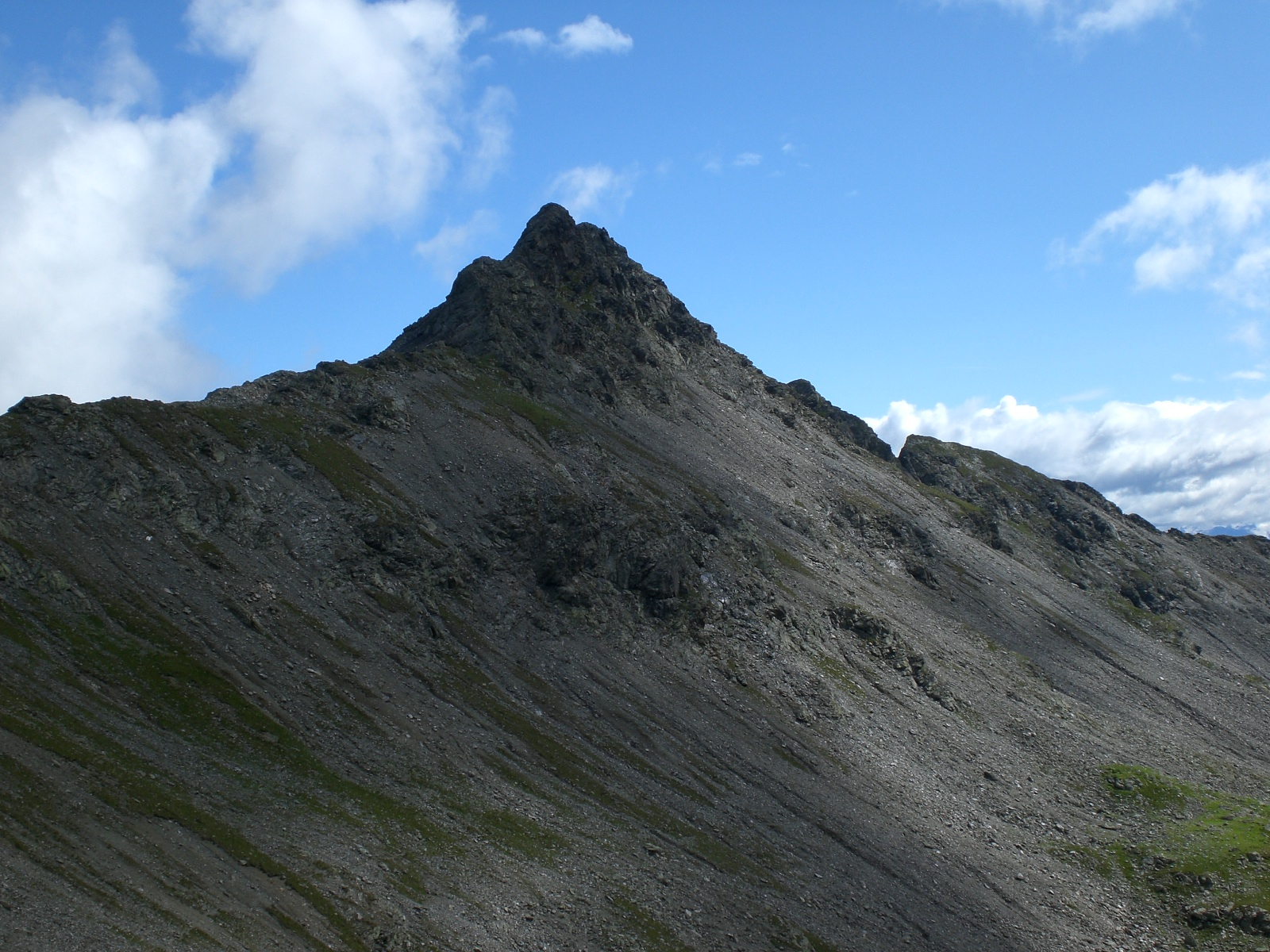
- The Tagewaldhorn (2.708 m) from SE above the innermost Flagger valley, Sarntal Alps, South Tyrol.

Highest point
- Elevation: 2,708 m (8,885 ft)
- Coordinates: 46°46′50″N 11°29′49″E

Geography
- Location: South Tyrol, Italy
- Parent range: Sarntal Alps

Climbing
- First ascent: 12 July 1885 by Julius Pock

The Tagewaldhorn (Italian: Corno di Tramin; German: Tagewaldhorn) is a mountain in the Sarntal Alps in South Tyrol, Italy.
