= Hirzer (Sarntal Alps) =

Mountain in Italy

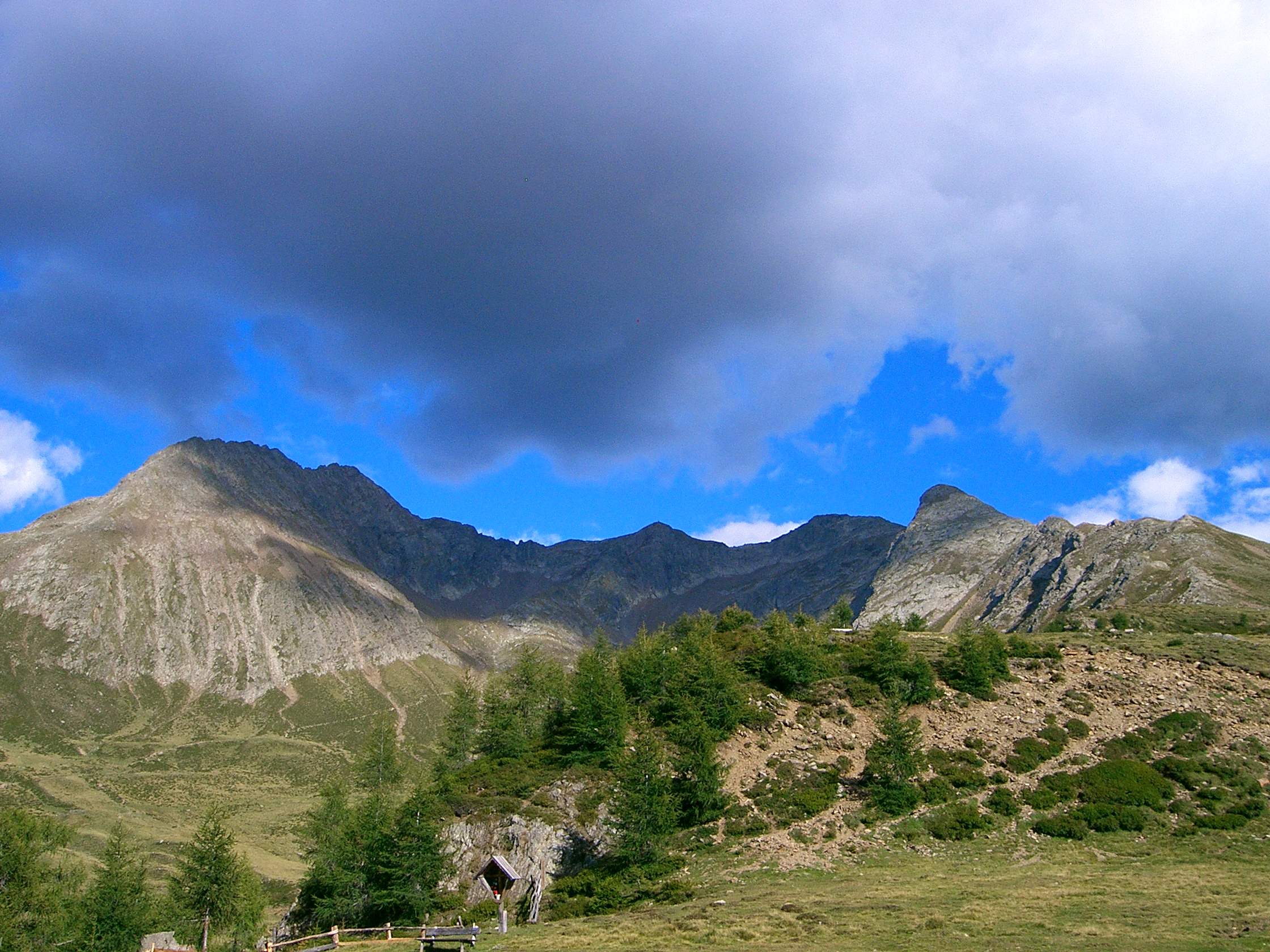
- The Hirzer massif

Highest point
- Elevation: 2,781 m (9,124 ft)
- Coordinates: 46°44′13″N 11°16′35″E

Geography
- Location within Alps
- Location: South Tyrol, Italy
- Parent range: Sarntal Alps

The Hirzer is a mountain in the Sarntal Alps in South Tyrol, Italy.
