= Zinseler =

Mountain in Italy

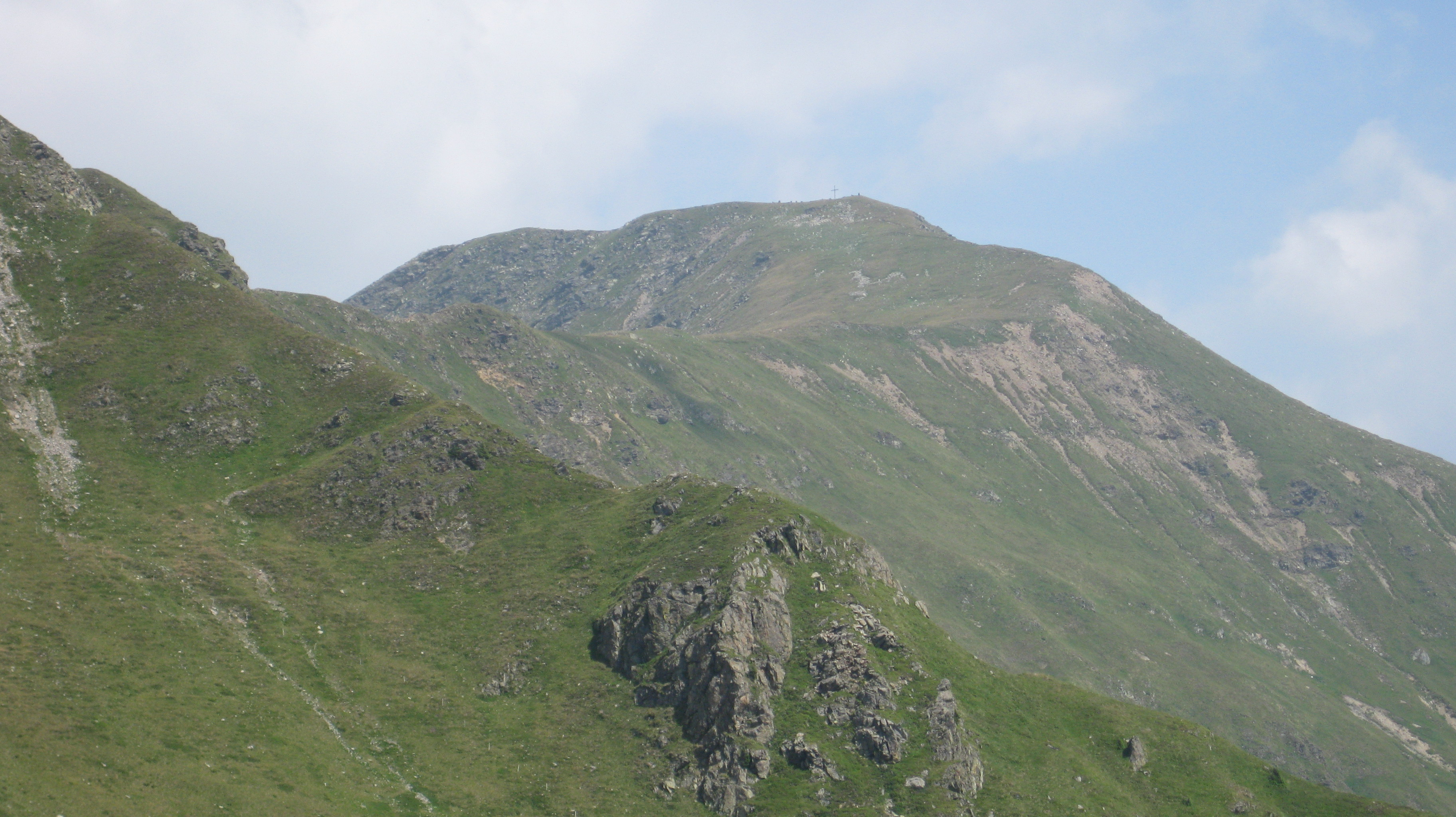
- Zinseler, view from the path between Huehnerspiel and the peak.

Highest point
- Elevation: 2,422 m (7,946 ft)
- Coordinates: 46°50′28″N 11°26′34″E

Geography
- Location within Italy
- Location: Sarntal Alps, close to the city of Sterzing, Italy

Zinseler (Italian: Cima di Stilves) is a mountain in the Sarntal Alps in South Tyrol in Italy. It has an elevation of 2,422 m and is located near Penser Joch saddle (Passo di Pennes) close to the city of Sterzing.
