= Joseph Ambrose Stapf =

Joseph Ambrose Stapf (1785, in Fließ – 1844, in Brixen) was an Austrian Catholic theologian.

He studied theology at Innsbruck, and in 1823 was named professor of moral theology and pedagogy at the seminary in Brixen.

== Works ==
- Theologia moralis in compendium redacta (1827–30)
- Epitome theologiæ moralis publicis prælectionibus accommodata (1832)
- Erziehungslehre im Geiste der katholischen Kirche (1832)
- Expositio casuum reservatorum in diocesi Brixinensi (1836)
- Der hl. Vincentius von Paul, dargestellt in seinem Leben und Wirken (1837)
- Die christliche Sittenlehre (1848–49)
