= Jakobsspitze =

Mountain in Italy

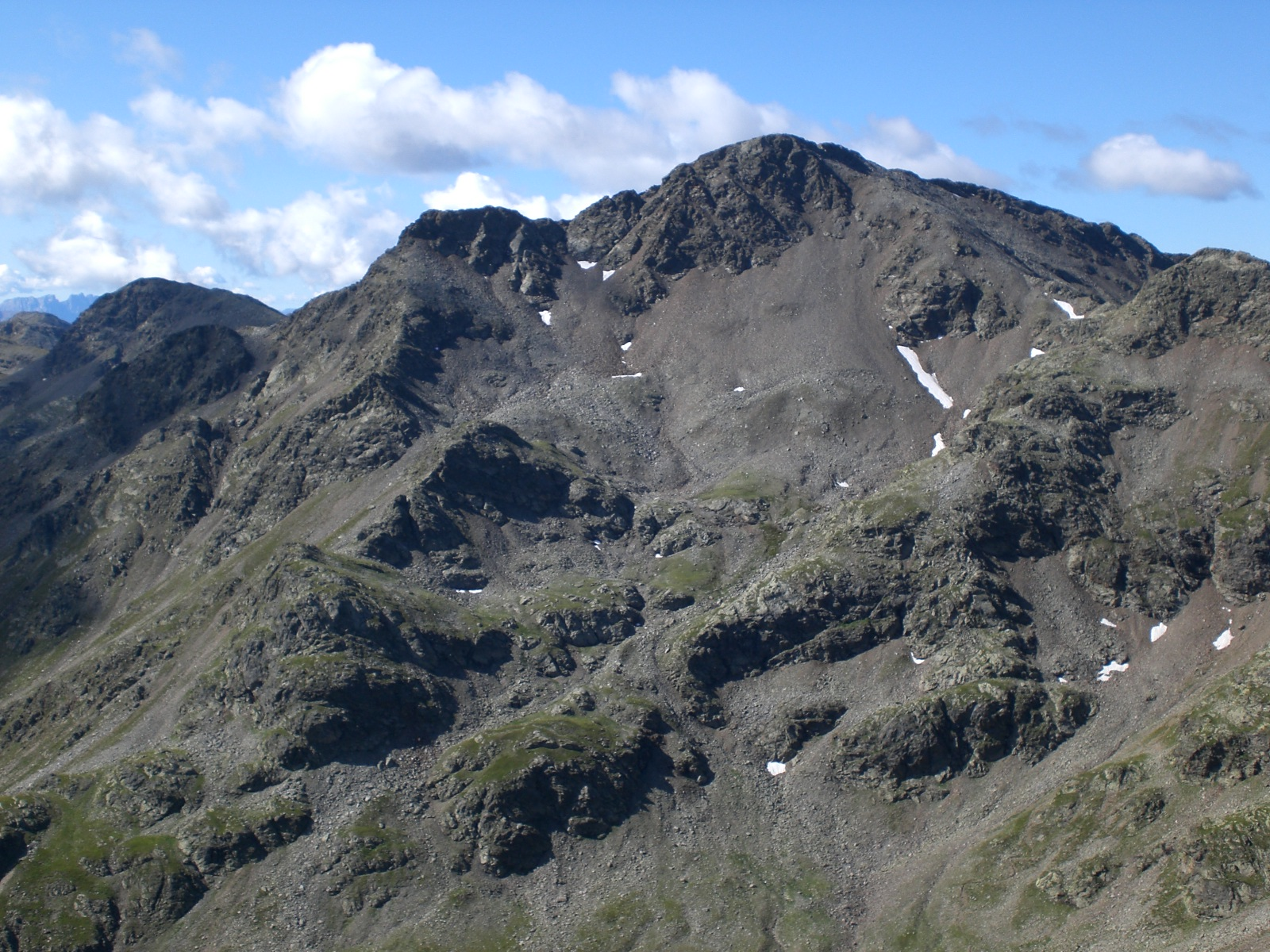

Highest point
- Elevation: 2,741 m (8,993 ft)
- Coordinates: 46°45′47″N 11°29′28″E

Geography
- Location: South Tyrol, Italy
- Parent range: Sarntal Alps

Climbing
- First ascent: 1880 by Julius Pock with Ludwig Purtscheller

The Jakobsspitze (Italian: Cima di San Giacomo; German: Jakobsspitze) is a mountain in the Sarntal Alps in South Tyrol, Italy.
