= Josef Murr =

Philologist and botanist

Josef Murr (6 June 1864, Brixen – 4 January 1932, Innsbruck) was an Austrian classical philologist and botanist.

In 1887 he received his PhD from the University of Innsbruck, afterwards working as a high school instructor in several communities, that included Trient (1896–1906) and Feldkirch (1906–1919). As a botanist, he was a taxonomic authority of numerous plants within the genera Chenopodium and Hieracium.

== Selected works ==
- Die Pflanzenwelt in der griechischen Mythologie. 1890 – The plant world in Greek mythology.
- Altgriechische Weisheit : Blumenlese von Sinnsprüchen aus griechischen Dichtern, 1891 – Ancient Greek wisdom : anthology of aphorisms from Greek poets.
- Vokalismus und Gefühlsstimmung, in ihrem Zusammenhang an Homer und Vergil erläutert, 1908 – Vocalisms and emotions: being explained in the context of Homer and Virgil.
- Neue Übersicht über die Farn- und Blütenpflanzen von Vorarlberg und Liechtenstein, 1923 – New survey of ferns and flowering plants of Vorarlberg and Liechtenstein.
