= Königsangerspitze =

Mountain in Italy

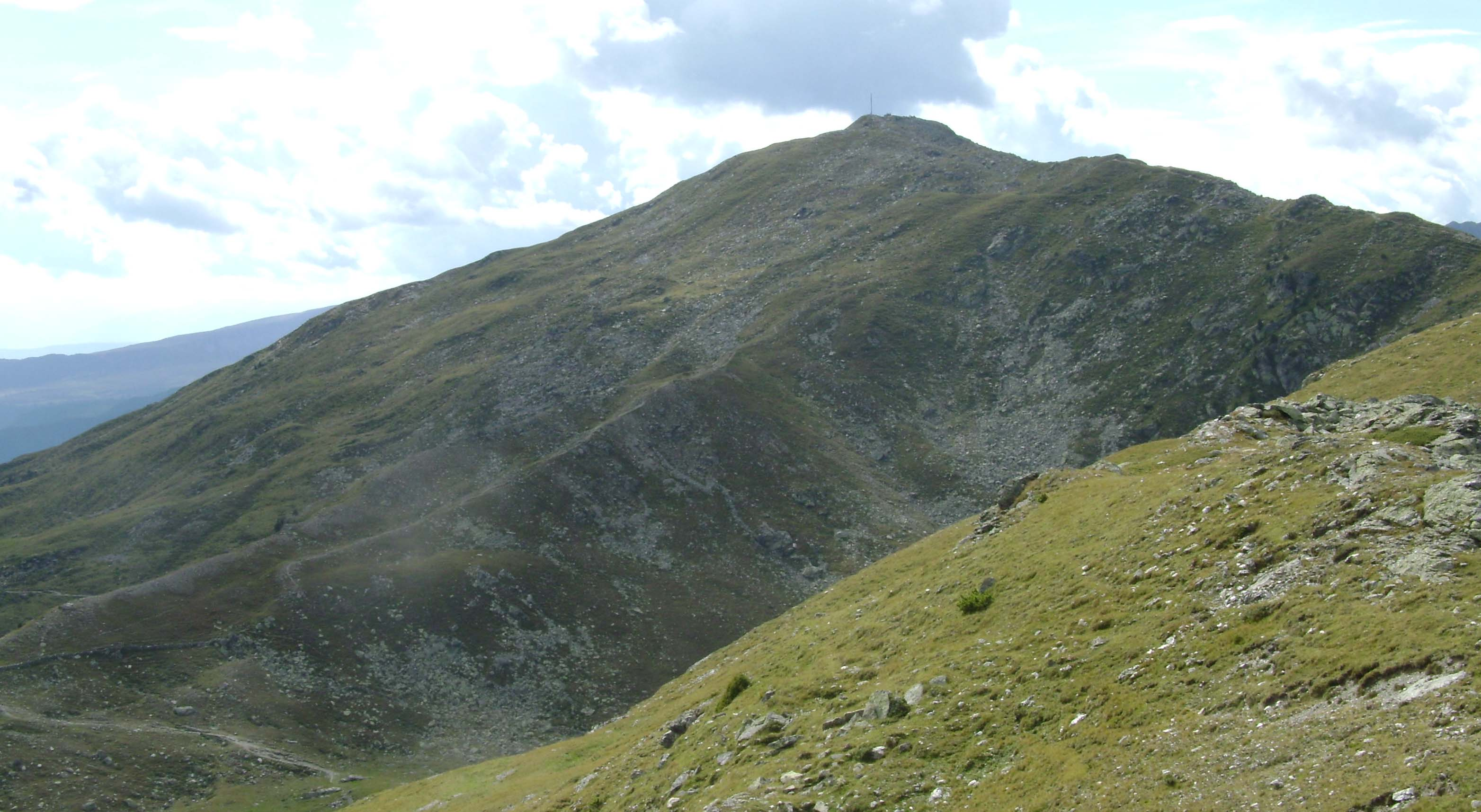

Highest point
- Elevation: 2,439 m (8,002 ft)
- Coordinates: 46°42′24″N 11°34′17″E

Geography
- Location within Italy
- Location: South Tyrol, Italy
- Parent range: Sarntal Alps

The Königsangerspitze (Italian: Monte Pascolo; German: Königsangerspitze) is a mountain in the Sarntal Alps in South Tyrol, Italy. Until the 19th century it was also known as Mount Rodella.
