= Kassianspitze =

Mountain in Italy

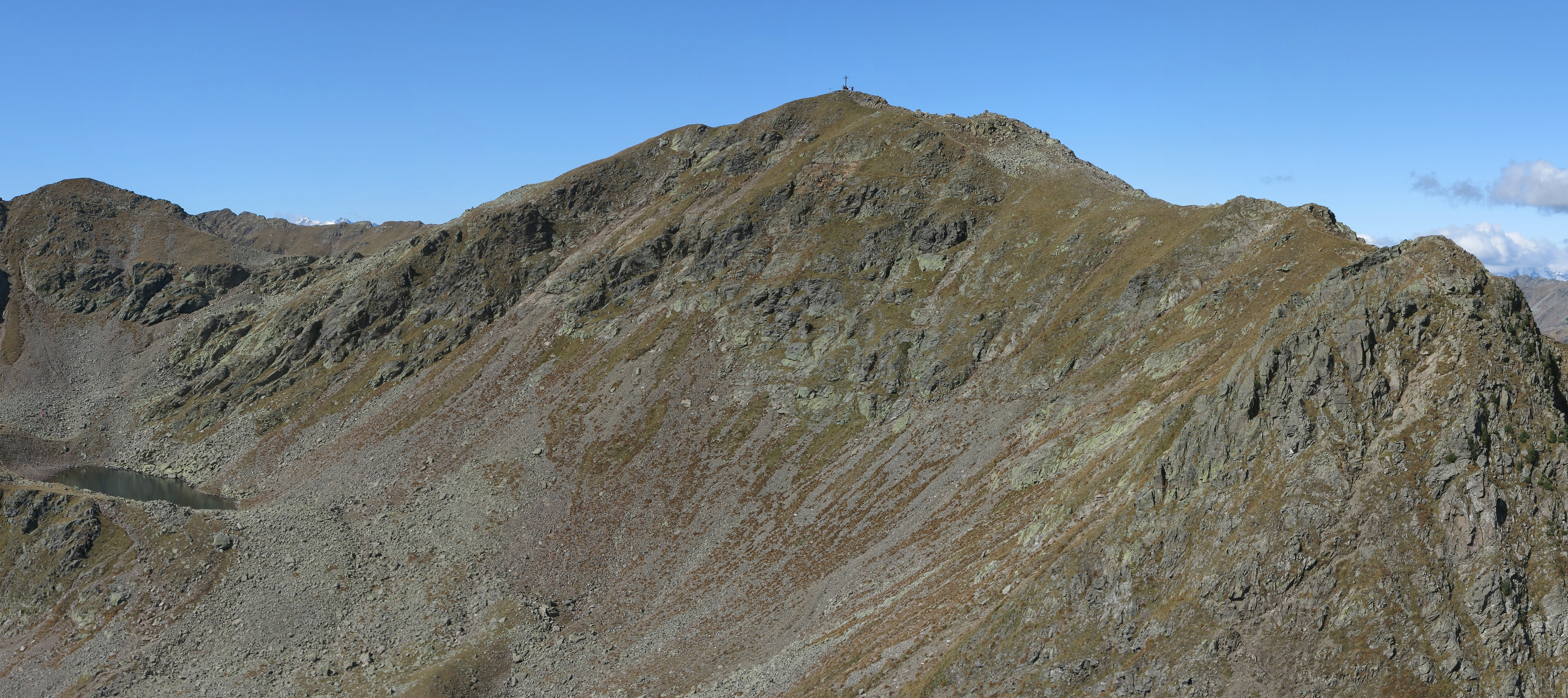

Highest point
- Elevation: 2,581 m (8,468 ft)
- Coordinates: 46°42′32″N 11°29′48″E

Geography
- Location: South Tyrol, Italy
- Parent range: Sarntal Alps

The Kassianspitze (Italian: Cima di San Cassiano; German: Kassianspitze) is a mountain in the Sarntal Alps in South Tyrol, Italy.
