= Sarntal Alps =

Mountain range in Italy

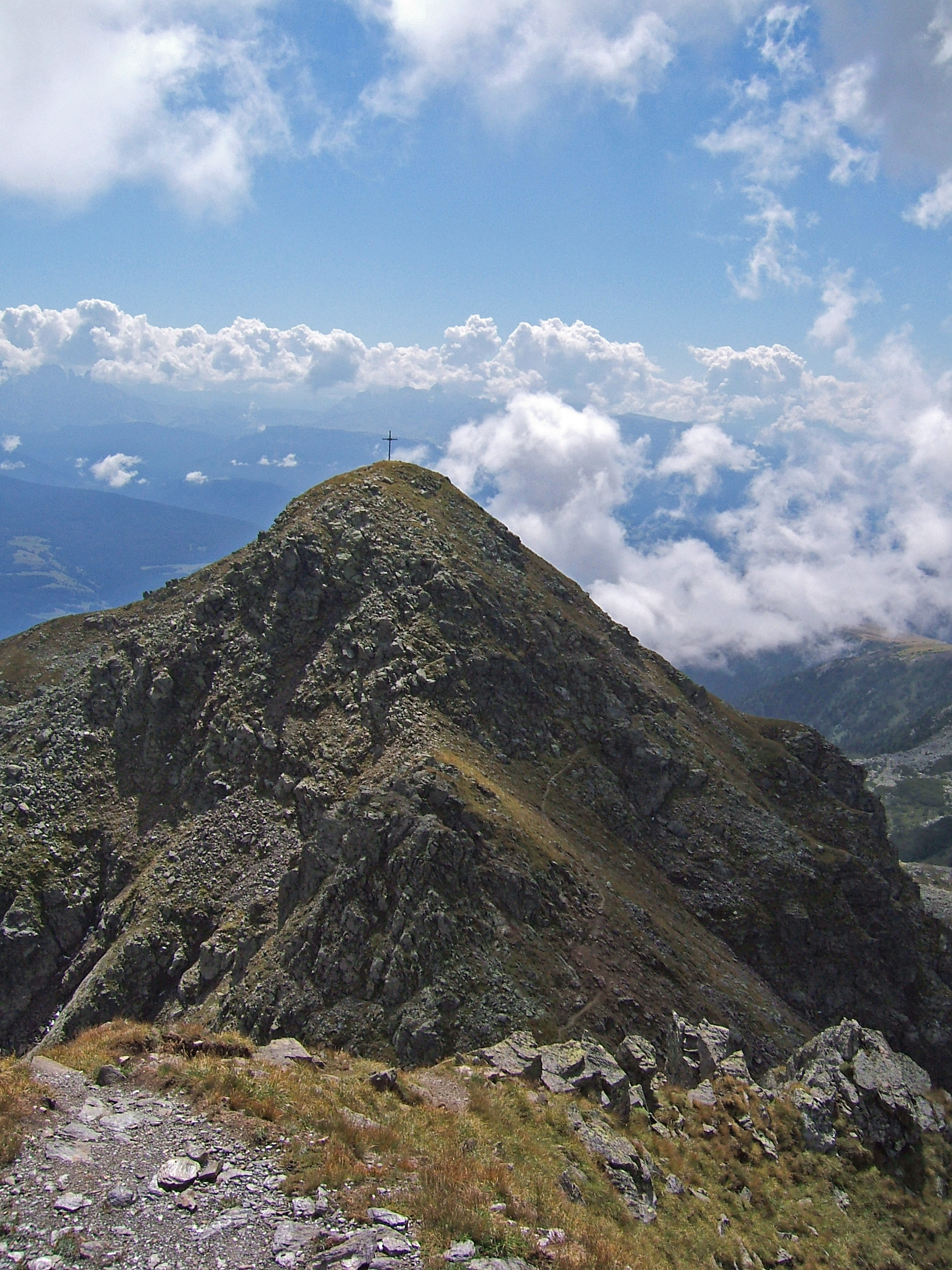
- The Sarntal east ridge rarely forms rugged peaks, in the picture: Ritzlar, 2528 m.

Highest point
- Peak: Hirzer (Sarntal Alps)
- Elevation: 2,781 m (9,124 ft)
- Coordinates: 46°44′13″N 11°16′35″E

Geography
- Country: Italy
- State: South Tyrol
- Parent range: Eastern Rhaetian Alps, Central Eastern Alps

The Sarntal Alps (German: Sarntaler Alpen, Italian: Alpi Sarentine) are a mountain range of the Eastern Rhaetian Alps, in South Tyrol (Italy), which surrounds the Sarntal (valley). It is limited by the Etschtal, Eisacktal, Passeiertal and the Jaufen Pass.

== Topography ==
The Sarntal Alps are divided into an Eastern and a Western Part, which meet at the Penser Joch. The Eastern Part has got various minor ridges.

=== Eastern Part ===
The Southern half (south to Kassianspitze) is compared to the surrounding ranges not that elevated, its highest peaks are Villanderer Berg (2509m) and Rittner Horn (2260m), further south it becomes the Ritten.

The northern has got the Tatschspitze (2528m), Tagewaldhorn (2708m), Jakobsspitze (2742m), Schrotthorn (2590m), Plankenhorn (2543m) Kassianspitze (2581m).

The biggest minor ridge of the Sarntal Alps is the Middle Ridge, beginning at the Hörtlanerspitze (2660m), it limites the Durnholztal. Its most known peaks are Gentersbergspitze (2411m), Hoferspitze (2438m) and Leiterspitze (2375m), which is its last peak. The other minor ridge to the west is the Getrumkamm, with its peaks Plankenhorn (2589 m) and Getrumspitze.

The minor ridges on the Eisack side are due to Flaggertal and Schalderer Tal. Limited to the north by Flaggertal and to the south by Schalderer Tal exists a ridge with Karspitze (2517m) as its highest peak and limited to the north by Schalderer Tal exists a ridge with Lorenzispitze (2483m) and Königsangerspitze (2439m).

=== Western Part ===
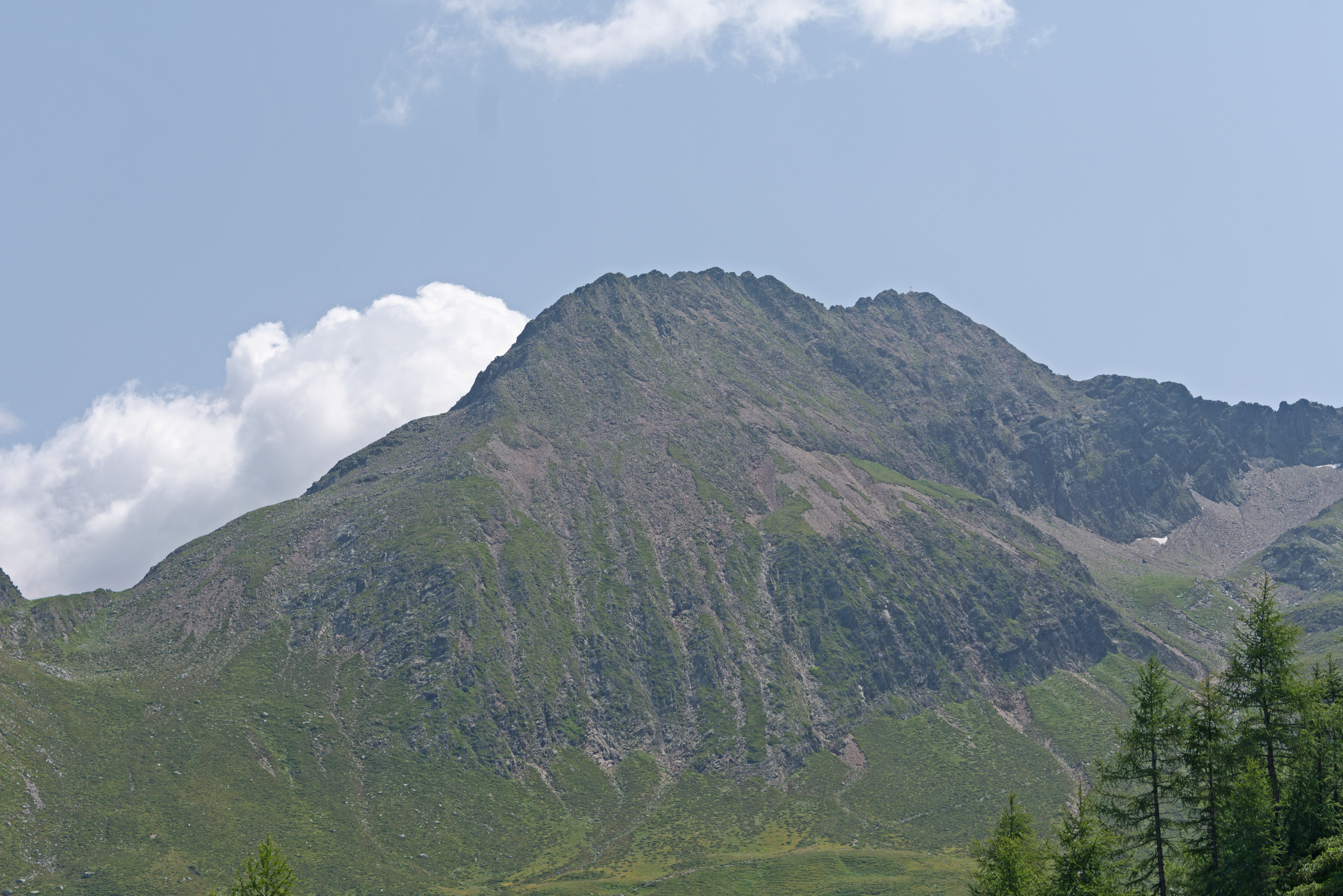
The Hirzer from the southwest

The southern half is not that elevated, it is called Tschöggelberg.

Its middle part consists of the highest mountains, that among the Hirzer (2781m), Alplerspitze (2750m), Hönigsspitze (2698m) and Plattinger Spitze (2670m). More to the west, there is the Ifinger.

The most notable mountains of the northern part are the Penser Weißhorn (2705 m), Zinseler (2422m), Jaufenspitze (2481m), Hochwart (2748m) and Ötsch (2592m).

== Sights ==
The churchhouse Latzfonser Kreuz is one of the highest located (2,311m) places of pilgrimage in South Tyrol.

At the southern side of the Ritten, the natural phenomenum of hoodoo can be seen.
