= Rivelaunbach =

Coordinates: 46.4944°N 11.3794°E

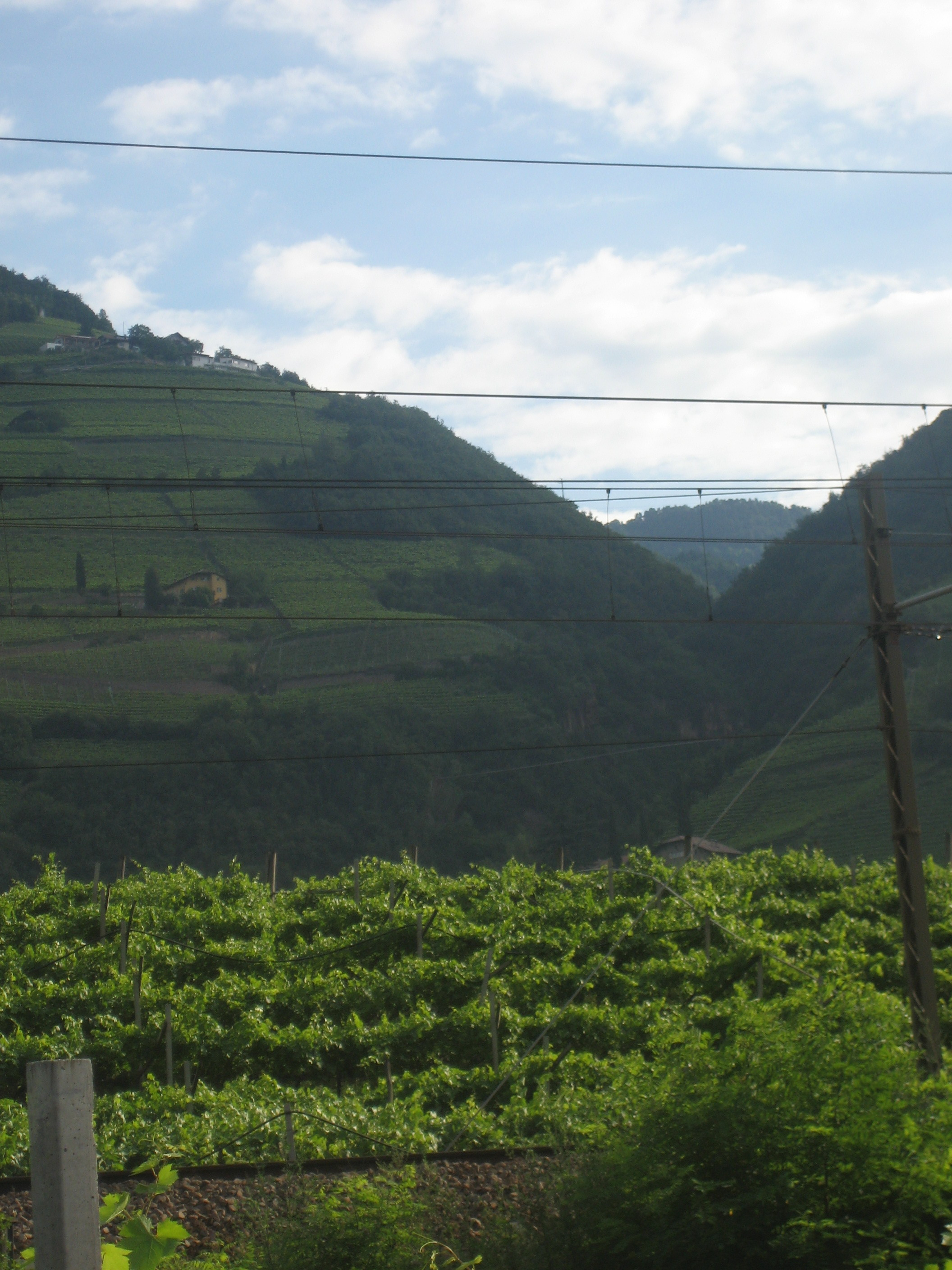

Location
- Country: Italy

Physical characteristics
- Source
  - location: West of the Wolfsgrubener See (South Tyrol)
- Mouth
  - location: Eisack at Bolzano
- Length: 5 km (3.1 mi)

The Rivelaunbach (Italian: Rio Rivellone; German: Rivelaunbach) is a stream in South Tyrol, Italy.
