= Penser Joch =

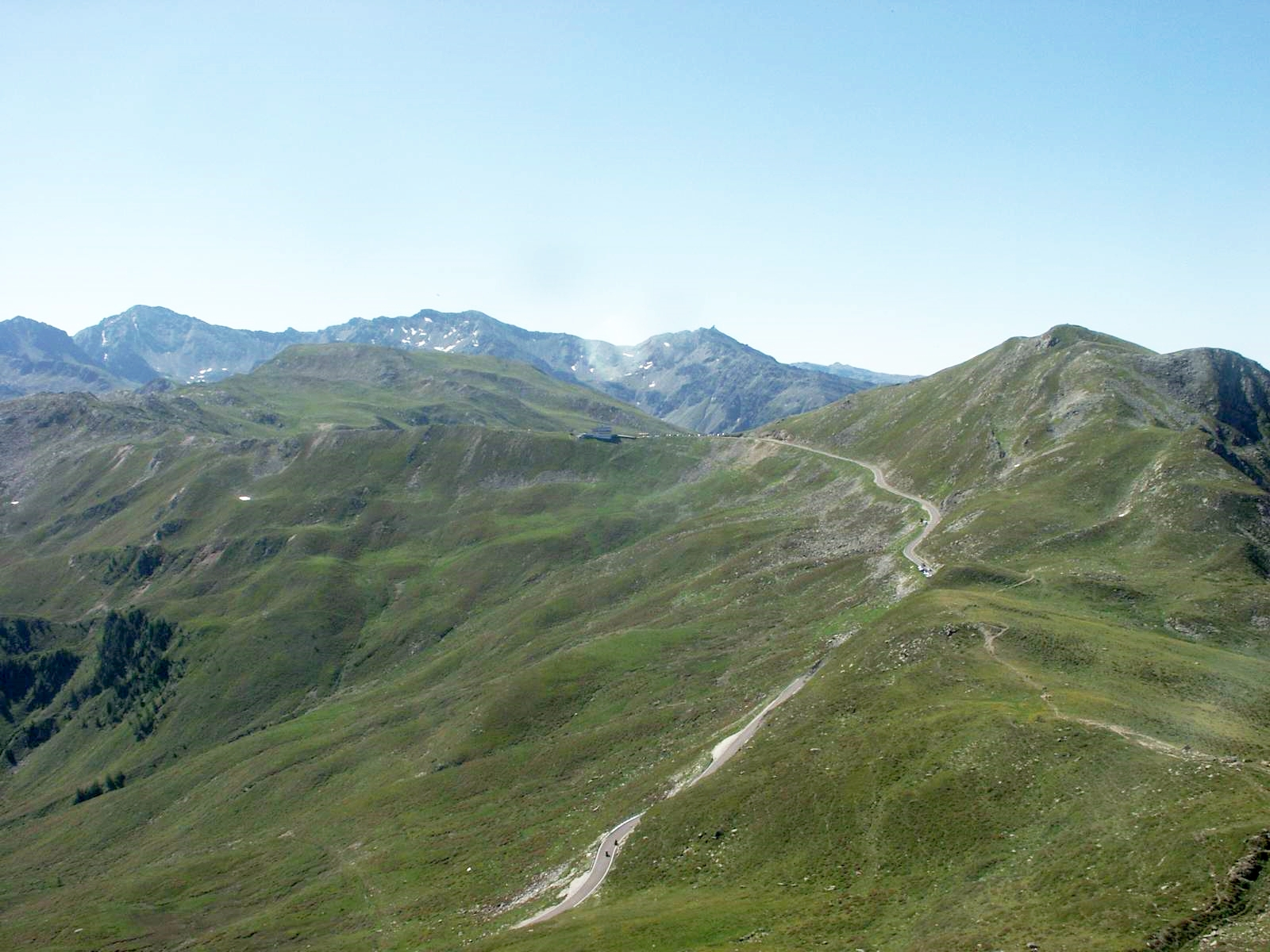
- The Penser Joch, view from the path to Zinseler.

- Location within Alps
- Elevation: 2,211 metres (7,254 ft)

Third Approach
- Location: South Tyrol, Italy
- Range: Alps
- Coordinates: 46°49′8″N 11°26′32″E

The Penser Joch (Italian: Passo di Pènnes; German: Penser Joch) (2211 m) is a high mountain pass in South Tyrol, northern Italy, near the Jaufenpass. It connects Bolzano via the Sarntal and with Sterzing in the Wipptal. It is the most direct road between Innsbruck and Bolzano. It is traversed by the SS 508 highway, which has a maximum grade of 13 percent. There is a restaurant at the summit. Although, it has been widened repeatedly in recent years, the road is still rather narrow.

== See also ==
- List of highest paved roads in Europe
- List of mountain passes
