= Rittner Horn =

Mountain in Italy

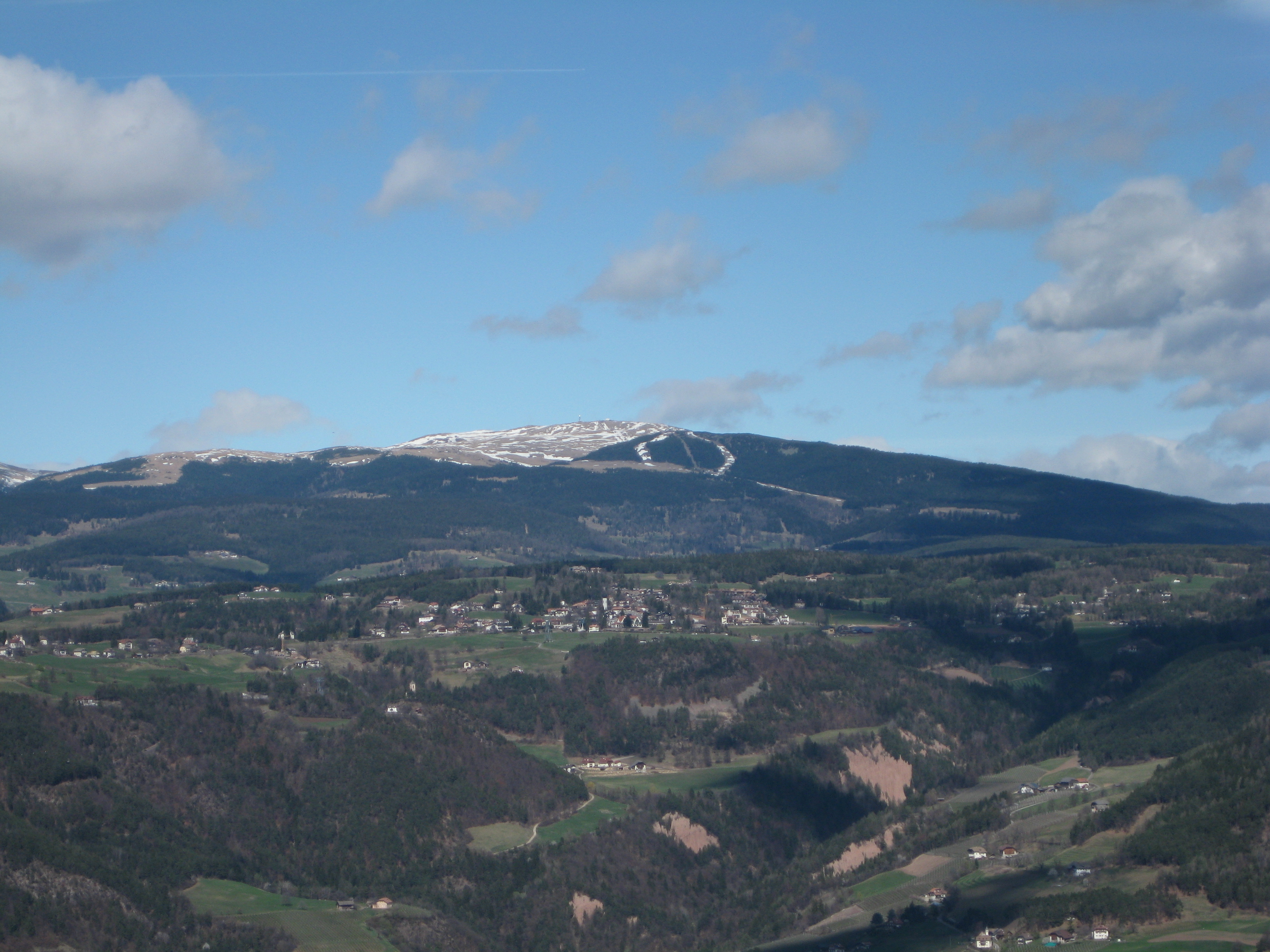

Highest point
- Elevation: 2,260 m (7,410 ft)
- Coordinates: 46°36′54″N 11°27′39″E

Geography
- Location within Alps
- Location: South Tyrol, Italy
- Parent range: Sarntal Alps

The Rittner Horn (Italian: Corno del Renon; German: Rittner Horn) is a mountain in South Tyrol, Italy.
