= Durnholzer Tal =

Coordinates: 46°44′20″N 11°26′20″E

The Durnholzer Tal (Italian: Valdurna; German: Durnholzer Tal) is a tributary valley of the Sarntal in South Tyrol, Italy. The villages in the valley are Durnholz and Reinswald, which are frazioni of the municipality of Sarntal.
