= Johann Nepomuk von Tschiderer zu Gleifheim =

Austrian-Italian Roman Catholic prelate

Blessed Johann Nepomuk von Tschiderer zu Gleifheim
- Bishop of Trent
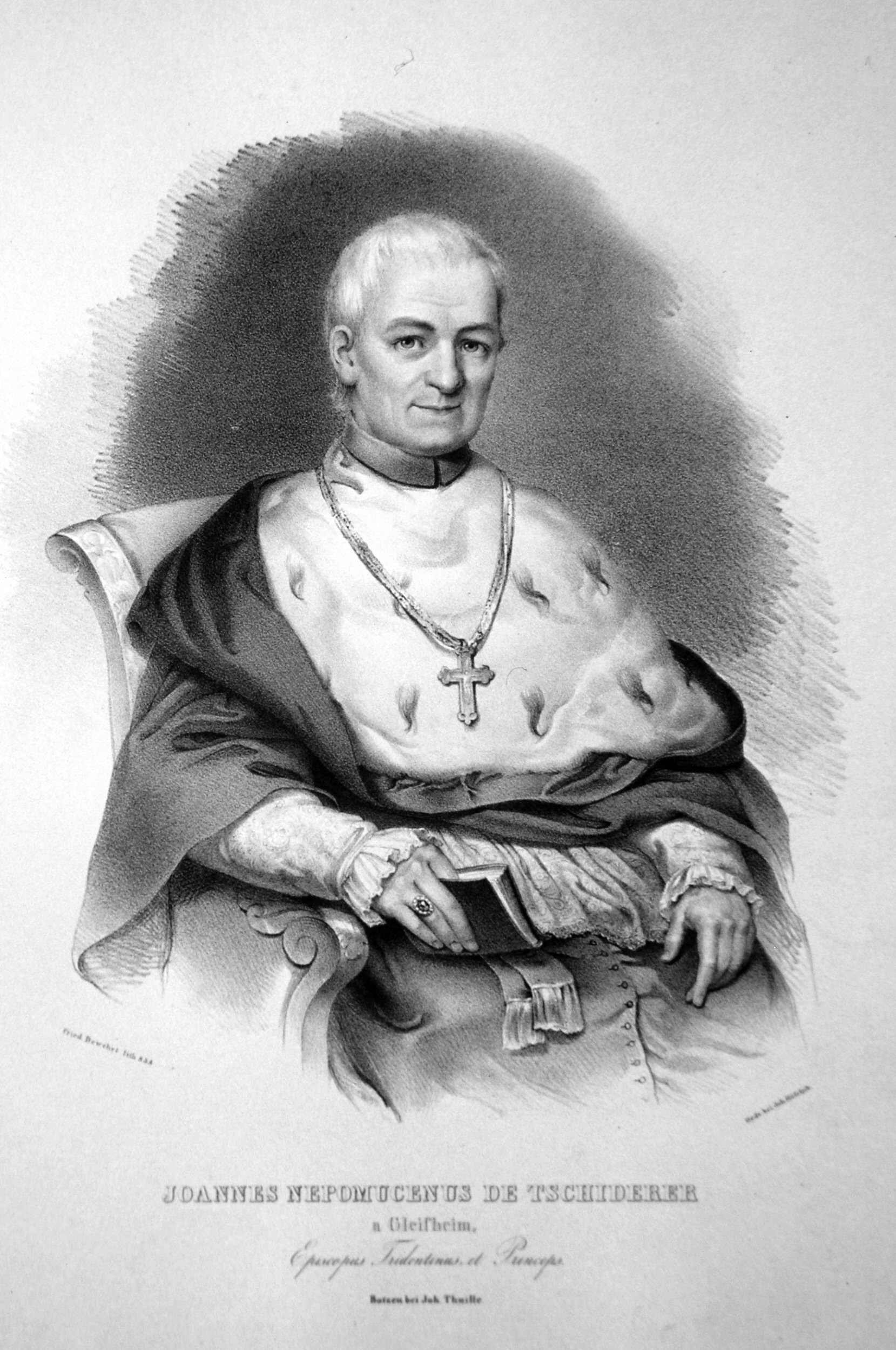
- c. 1858.
- Church: Roman Catholic Church
- Diocese: Trent
- See: Trent
- Appointed: 19 December 1834
- Installed: 3 May 1835
- Term ended: 3 December 1860
- Predecessor: Franz Xavier Luschin
- Successor: Benedetto Riccabona de Reinchenfels
- Previous posts: Auxiliary Bishop of Brixen (1832-1834); Titular Bishop of Helenopolis in Bithynia (1832-1834)

Orders
- Ordination: 27 July 1800 by Emmanuele Maria Thun
- Consecration: 20 May 1832 by Bernhard Galura
- Rank: Bishop

Personal details
- Born: Johann Nepomuk von Tschiderer zu Gleifheim; 15 April 1777 Bolzano, Holy Roman Empire
- Died: 3 December 1860 (aged 83) Trento, Austrian Empire

Sainthood
- Feast day: 3 December
- Venerated in: Roman Catholic Church
- Beatified: 30 April 1995; Trento, Italy by Pope John Paul II
- Attributes: Episcopal attire

Johann Nepomuk von Tschiderer zu Gleifheim (15 April 1777 - 3 December 1860) was an Austrian-Italian Roman Catholic prelate and the Bishop of Trent from 1834 until his death. He was born to Austrians but was considered to be an Austro-Italian due to having been born in the Italian town of Bolzano.

Pope John Paul II beatified him in Trento on 30 April 1995 before 100,000 people. The cause started in 1886 under Pope Leo XIII and Pope Paul VI titled him as Venerable in 1968.

== Life ==
Johann Nepomuk von Tschiderer zu Gleifheim was born on 15 April 1777 in Bolzano as the fifth of seven sons of Joseph Joachim von Tschiderer zu Gleifheim and Caterina de Giovanelli. His ancestors emigrated from the Grisons close to the Italian border in 1529; the Emperor Ferdinand III had given the Tschiderer house a patent making them nobles in 1620. On his maternal side he was related to Joseph von Giovanelli zu Gerstburg und Hörtenberg (12 September 1784 - 14 September 1845) and to Ignaz von Giovanelli zu Gerstburg und Hörtenberg (5 April 1815 - 16 August 1889).

Johann was baptized moments after his birth at the Assumption church. He received his education from the Order of Friars Minor in 1786 after completing his initial education and resided with his maternal grandfather. He suffered from slight stuttering problems during his life. He relocated to Innsbruck with his parents in Austria in 1792 and underwent theological and philosophical studies at the college there. He was elevated to the diaconate on 24 June 1800 and later received his ordination to the priesthood on 27 July 1800 both from Emmanuel Count von Thun, Bishop of Trent. Tschiderer celebrated his first Mass at San Antonio di Padua church at Collalbo.

From 1800 to 1802 he spent time as an assistant priest and then travelled to Rome for further studies and a pilgrimage where he was named as an apostolic notarius; he met the new Pope Pius VII several times during the course of 1802. He later returned and assumed pastoral work once more in the German part of Trento and was later made a professor of moral and pastoral theological studies at the episcopal seminary. In 1810 he became the parish priest at Sarentino - where he opened a small school - and then sent on 13 September 1819 as the new parish priest at Merano.

On 26 October 1826 the Prince-Bishop Luschin appointed him as the cathedral canon and then on 26 December 1827 pro-vicar at Trento; on 24 February 1832 the Prince-Bishop Galura from Brixen selected him as Titular Bishop of Heliopolis - which received papal confirmation - and then as the vicar-general for Vorarlberg while also being named as an Auxiliary Bishop of Brixen at the same time. He received his episcopal consecration on 20 May 1832 in a Servite church. In 1834 the Emperor Francis I nominated him as the new Bishop of Trent - or prince-bishop. On 5 May 1835 he entered upon his office.

== Bishop ==
Tschiderer spent his episcopate writing and preaching as well as teaching catechism. He devoted a considerable part of his revenues to the building and restoration of over 60 churches and to the purchase of books for the parsonages and chaplains' houses. He used the third centennial of the opening of the Council of Trent to promote religious revival through popular pastoral initiatives. His charitable outreach to the poor and the sick was carried so far that he was often left without much himself. He left his residence to the institution for the deaf and dumb at Trento and to the educational institute for seminarians that he had founded and was later named after him as the "Joanneum". Tschiderer tended to the victims of cholera epidemics in 1836 and in 1855 as well as to those affected in a war in 1859; he intervened to prevent the 20 March 1848 uprising becoming a bloodbath and was hailed as a hero. He tried to appeal to the Austrian forces to spare the lives of 21 members of the Franco-Italian forces who were captured but was denied so provided religious assistance and a solemn burial for them after their executions. Tschiderer ordained as a priest Daniele Comboni in 1854. He promoted the Redemptorists and Jesuits in the region.

Tschiderer planned a pilgrimage to Rome in 1854 to commemorate the dogma of the Immaculate Conception but his ill health prevented him from doing so. He died during the evening of 3 December 1860 after suffering high fevers and being bedridden while also suffering from a heart ailment since 1859. He received the Anointing of the Sick prior to his death and a papal blessing from Pope Pius IX.

== Beatification ==
The beatification cause opened in an informative process in Trento from 1873 until 1877. His writings received theological approval on 16 April 1885; an apostolic process was held in Trento as well from 1890 until 1896. The formal introduction to the cause came under Pope Leo XIII on 27 May 1886 in which he was titled as a Servant of God. The Congregation for Rites validated the two previous processes on 3 July 1898. An antepreparatory committee met and approved the cause on 21 February 1905 as did a preparatory one on 5 January 1937 and then a general one on 18 June 1943. Pope Paul VI confirmed that Tschiderer led a model Christian life of heroic virtue and named him as Venerable on 14 July 1968.

The miracle for beatification was investigated in 1908 and received C.O.R. validation on 27 September 1908. The medical board met and approved it decades later on 1 April 1992 as did theologians on 19 June 1992 and the Congregation for the Causes of Saints on 3 December 1992. Pope John Paul II approved this on 21 December 1992 and beatified Tschiderer in Trento before a crowd of 100 000 people.

== Books ==
- Mayr, Johann (1998). Bischof Johann Nepomuk von Tschiderer, 1777-1860: ein Zeit- und Lebensbild (in German). Bozen: Verlagsanstalt Athesia. ISBN 978-88-7014-974-6.
- Tait, Leben des ehrwürdigen Dieners Gottes Johann Nepomuk von Tschiderer. Nach den Prozessakten und beglaubigten Urkunden (2 vols., Venice, 1904), Ger. tr. Schlegel (Trent, 1908)
