= Ingenuinus =

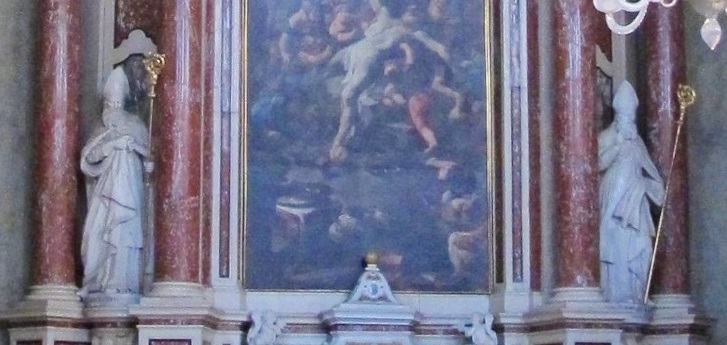
Statues of the bishops Saint Ingenuinus and Albuinus on the Cassian Altar in Brixen Cathedral, where their relics are venerated

Ingenuinus or Ingenuin, also Jenewein (d. c. 605), was the second historically confirmed bishop of Sabiona or Säben. He is venerated as a saint.

== Life ==
Little is known of his life. He was probably bishop of Sabiona from 577 to his death in about 605 and of Roman descent. His bishopric, which covered much of the former province of Raetia Secunda, was fought over during that period by the Lombards and the Franks.

The name Ingenuinus probably means "little kneeling one". In the Middle Ages this was Germanised to Jenewein.

From 588 to 590 he took part in the Synod of Marano at Aquileia. In 590 the Franks invaded the valley of the Adige over the Reschen Pass, destroying several Lombard-Roman strongholds. During the siege of the fortress of Verucca near Trento, Ingenuinus communicated with Bishop Agnellus of Trento. In 591, with other bishops, he signed a document to the emperor Maurikios, in which he opposed Pope Gregory the Great in the context of the Three-Chapter Controversy.

Because he suffered from the attacks of the Arian Lombards, the pagan Baiuvarii and the Slavs, he was venerated as a martyr between the mid-10th century and the beginning of the 12th century; in modern times he is venerated as a confessor.

Ingenuinus died in Säben and was probably first buried there. Later, in about 990, his relics were translated to Brixen Cathedral. In Säben in 1982 a bishop's grave was discovered that is contemporary with Ingenuinus.

== Veneration ==
His feast day is 5 February. He is called the patron saint of the people of the mountain and, along with Saints Cassian and Albuin, is venerated as the third patron saint of the Diocese of Bozen-Brixen.

== Literature ==
- Josef Gelmi: Bischof Ingenuin von Säben, Brixen (Weger) 2005; ISBN 8888910239
- Josef Riedmann: Ingenuin von Säben. In: Lexikon der Heiligen und der Heiligenverehrung. 2. Band. Herder, Freiburg i. B. 2003, ISBN 3-451-28192-9
- Anselm Sparber: Ingenuin. In: Lexikon für Theologie und Kirche. 1. Auflage, 5. Band. Herder, Freiburg i. B. 1933
- Ekkart Sauser (1999). "INGENUIN". In Bautz, Traugott (ed.). Biographisch-Bibliographisches Kirchenlexikon (BBKL) (in German). Vol. 16. Herzberg: Bautz. cols. 774–776. ISBN 3-88309-079-4.
