= Peter Anich =

Austrian cartographer and inventor

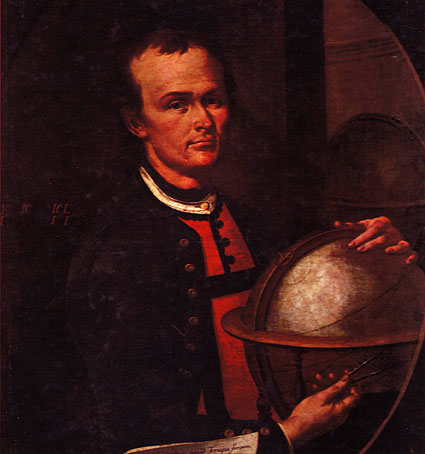
Peter Anich by Philipp Haller, 1759.

Atlas Tyrolensis

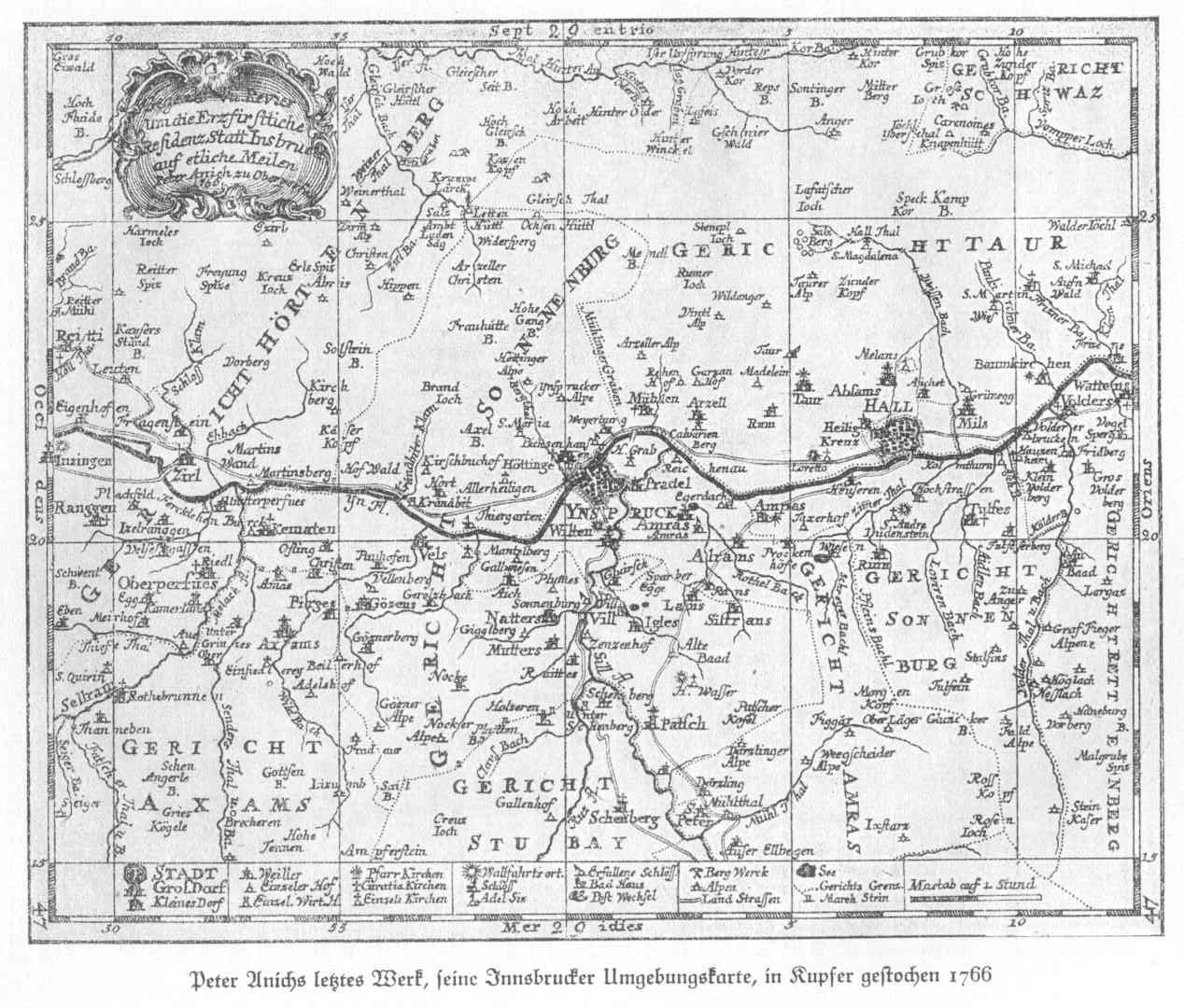
Anich's last work, Innsbruck, 1766.

In addition to the Atlas Tyrolensis Peter Anich created numerous globes and self-made measuring instruments.

Peter Anich (February 7, 1723 – September 1, 1766) was an Austrian cartographer and maker of mathematical instruments.

His works, especially the Atlas Tyrolensis published in 1774, are among the most accurate maps of their time. Anich, who is often referred to as a “farmer's cartographer” (Bauernkartograph) due to his rural origins, was also known as an astronomer and designer of sundials and globes.

== Life ==
Peter Anich was born in Oberperfuss, County of Tyrol, as the only son among four children of the farming couple Ingenuin and Gertrud Anich. Anich had to work on his parents' farm and probably did not receive a regular school education, but only learned some basic reading, writing and arithmetic from the local priest. In addition, his father taught him woodturning and encouraged his manual and construction skills, for example in the construction of simple measuring instruments. However, his father forbade some attempts to learn more about surveying and astronomy from the Jesuits in the nearby city Innsbruck. When he died in 1742, the 20-year-old Peter Anich took over the farm and the turner's workshop.

Anich began observing the sky and taking an interest in astronomy while he was still working as a shepherd. He set up an observation point on a nearby pear tree and found the celestial pole without any help by repeatedly aiming at many stars until he reached the (almost stationary) Pole Star. He constructed his first vertical sundial on a house wall in Oberperfuss as early as 1745. This was already a complicated construction, the calculation of which required trigonometric knowledge. It is not known how Anich acquired these skills. 1751, Anich went to Innsbruck and approached the Jesuit and mathematics professor Ignaz Weinhart, whom he asked to teach him astronomy and mathematics. After a brief examination, Weinhart was convinced of Anich's talent, offered him private lessons and became Anich's most important patron until the end of his life. In the following years, Anich traveled to Innsbruck on Sundays and public holidays to take lessons from Weinhart and make globes and scientific instruments for him.

From around 1756, Anich also began to work on cartography. In 1759 Weinhart suggested that Anich be commissioned to produce a new map of Tyrol, which later became known as the Atlas Tyrolensis. From 1760, Anich was given the task of completing Joseph Freiherr von Spergs' map of Tyrol, which he was unable to continue working on due to his dismissal to Vienna. After surveying and mapping the “northern Tyrol” (Tyrol with the exception of Welschtirol, which had already been mapped by Spergs) in the following years, he was also entrusted with mapping the southern part from 1764. From 1765 he was assisted by Blasius Hueber, who later completed the Atlas Tyrolensis. While working in the marshes of the Adige river, Anich, who had a rather weak constitution throughout his life and had been almost deaf for several years, fell ill with “gaol fever”, from which he never recovered. In the last months of his life, already impoverished due to his inability to work, he was awarded a gold medal of honor by Empress Maria Theresa. He was also portrayed for the university collection and was awarded a pension of 200 guilders a year. However, he was no longer able to claim this; after his death on September 1, 1766, it was paid to his sister Lucia.

== Work ==
Peter Anich's main work, the Atlas Tyrolensis, is one of the most internationally significant cartographic achievements of the 18th century due to its scale, precision and the size of the area depicted. Peter Anich used further developments of the plane table method for his surveys, which enabled particularly accurate triangulation. He worked in part with measuring instruments he had constructed himself. In addition, the depiction of the high mountain regions and in particular the glaciers in the Atlas Tyrolensis is considered to be particularly accurate for the time. Anich's rural background and manners enabled him to have good contact with the simple rural population and thus helped the Atlas Tyrolensis to acquire its rich treasure trove of geographical names, which had not been recorded until then.

At least ten large sundials in the Innsbruck area were made by Peter Anich. Some of them are complicated constructions which, in addition to the time, also show the month or the sign of the zodiac. Anich also became famous for his large celestial globe with a diameter of around one meter, which he constructed in 1756 under the guidance of Weinhart. However, little is known today about Anich's astronomical measurements and research that preceded this work. An earth globe of the same size followed in 1759; both works can be found today in the Landesmuseum (Tyrolean State Museum). He also constructed several smaller terrestrial and celestial globes, for which he also executed the map image himself as a copper engraving.

== Memories ==
The Anichstraße in Innsbruck, the Anichgasse in Graz, the Anichweg in Vienna-Floridsdorf, the Peter-Anich-Siedlung in Bruneck and the Geometeroberschule in Bolzano as well as the Peter-Anich-Hütte above Rietz are named after Peter Anich. The northern Ramolkogel in the Ötztal Alps also bears his name, Anichspitze. In addition, the only solar observatory in South Tyrol (Sonnenobservatorium Peter Anich) is named after him.

Oberperfuss pays tribute to its most illustrious citizen with a globe depicted in its municipal coat of arms. The local Anich-Hueber Museum displays documents, maps, surveying equipment and several terrestrial and celestial globes made by Anich.

His portrait head, carved in marble by Antonio Spagnoli, can be found on the façade of the Tyrolean State Museum Ferdinandeum together with those of other poets and scientists. A memorial plaque with Anich's portrait, created by Emmerich Kerle was placed in the Anichstraße in Innsruck around 1950.

== Literature ==
- Jürgen Helfricht: Das Universalgenie aus den Alpen. In: Hexenmeister und Bauernastronomen in Sachsen, Tauchaer publishing, Taucha 1999, ISBN 3-910074-97-9, p. 42–49.
- Otto Stolz (1953). "Anich, Peter". Neue Deutsche Biographie (in German). Vol. 1. Berlin: Duncker & Humblot. pp. 297–298. (full text online).
- Constantin von Wurzbach: "Anich, Peter." In: Biographisches Lexikon des Kaiserthums Oesterreich (Biographical Lexicon of the Empire of Austria). Part 1 Universitäts-Buchdruckerei L. C. Zamarski (formerly J. P. Sollinger), Vienna 1856, p. 41 f. (digitalised).
- Julius Löwenberg: Anich, Peter. In: Allgemeine Deutsche Biographie (ADB). Volume 1, Duncker & Humblot, Leipzig 1875, p. 465."
- Arthur Dürst: Peter Anich. Tiroler Landesmuseum Ferdinandeum, Innsbruck 1966.
- Ein Tyroler Bäuerlein. In: Die Gartenlaube. Volium 44, 1862, p. 693–694 (text at Wikisource).
- Hans Kinzl (Ed.): Peter Anich 1723–1766: der erste „Bauernkartograph“ von Tirol: Beiträge zur Kenntnis seines Lebenswerkes. Wagner, Innsbruck 1976 (= Tiroler Wirtschaftsstudien, 32) LCCN 77-476137 OCLC 3312076
- Hanspeter Fischer: Vermessungen und Kartierungen in Tirol und in Vorderösterreich, 1760 bis 1793. In: Cartographica Helvetica, Issue 19 (1999) S. 37–45. doi:10.5169/seals-10771.
- Rudolf Henz: Peter Anich, der Sternsucher. Amandus-Verlag, Viena 1946.
- Karl Paulin: Peter Anichs Schicksalsstunden: Bilder aus dem Leben des grossen Bauernkartographen.
- Die Tirol-Karte oder der Atlas Tyrolensis des Peter Anich und des Blasius Hueber aus dem Jahre 1774. (PDF; 541 kB). Tiroler Landesarchiv, 2006.
- Hans Kinzl: Die kleinen Globen des Tiroler „Bauernkartographen“ Peter Anich. Innsbruck 1976.
- Hans Kinzl: Die Darstellung der Gletscher im Atlas Tyrolensis von Peter Anich und Blasius Hueher. Klebelsberg Commemorative Volume of the Geological Society, Volume 48, Vienna 1956.
- Sybille Moser-Ernst and Ursula Marinelli: Das Bild des Peter Anich. Der Porträtmaler Philipp Haller in einer Studie zu Kunst und Wissenschaft im 18. Jahrhundert. innsbruck university press, Innsbruck 2025.
