= Säben Abbey =

Abbey in Klausen, Italy

Coordinates: 46°38′47″N 11°34′06″E

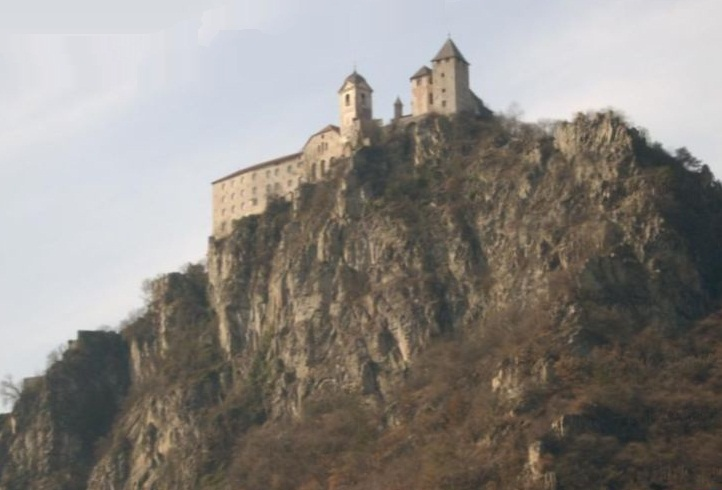
Säben Abbey

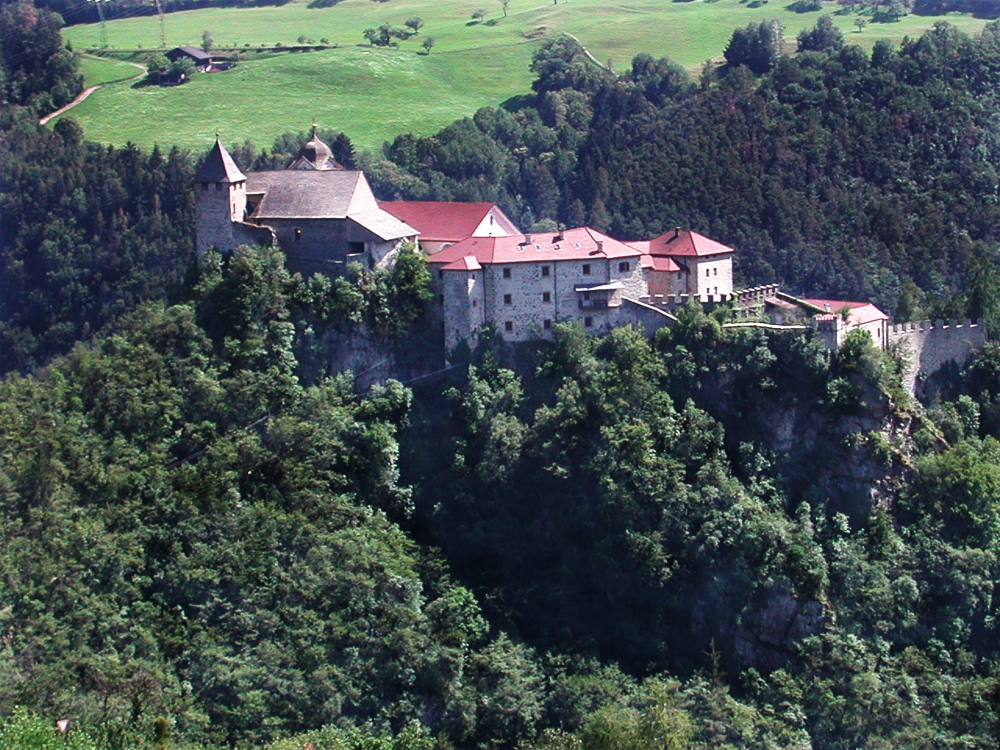
Aerial view of Säben Abbey

Säben Abbey (German: Kloster Säben; Ladin: Cunvënt de Jevun; Italian: Monastero di Sabiona) was a Benedictine nunnery located near Klausen in South Tyrol, northern Italy. It was established in 1687, when it was first settled by the nuns of Nonnberg Abbey in Salzburg. The last nuns left the abbey in 2021.

== History ==
Säben (from Latin: Sabiona), situated on the "holy mountain", was for centuries a centre of pilgrimage and controlled an extensive religious precinct. Situated above the town of Klausen, the hill it is built on was already settled during the New Stone Age. On the site of the present nunnery there was an earlier Roman settlement.

Between the 6th century and about 960 there was a bishopric (episcopatus Sabiona) seated here. The church "im Weinberg" dates from that time and its remains have been excavated along with a large burial ground in recent times. Bishop Ingenuin is documented as a participant in the Synod of Grado in 579.

On 13 September 901 King Louis the Child granted Bishop Zacharias the farm of Prichsna, later to become Brixen, to which the bishops had moved under Bishop Richbert (around 960).

Säben later became a fortress of the bishops. In the 14th and 15th centuries Säben Castle (Burg Säben) was the seat of the judges of Klausen and the centre of administration of the southern territories of the Diocese of Brixen.

A community of Benedictine nuns was established here in 1686 by the local priest, in premises at the foot of the mountain. The abbey church was dedicated by Johann Franz, Count Khuen von Belasi, then Bishop of Brixen.

Although the nunnery was repeatedly looted during the Napoleonic Wars and stripped of its assets during the secularization in 1803, the community survived although in an impoverished state through the 19th century until it gradually revived from about 1880, when, during the period of the Kulturkampf in Germany (1871–1878), the monks of Beuron Abbey were in exile in the county of Tyrol and were in contact with the nuns at Säben. At this time new premises were built in the ruins of the castle on the mountain. The nuns of Säben adopted the Beuronese mode of life, although the abbey was formally accepted into the Beuronese Congregation of the Benedictine Confederation only in 1974.

In 2021, the last three nuns left the abbey.
