= Karl Golser =

- Bishop of Bolzano-Brixen
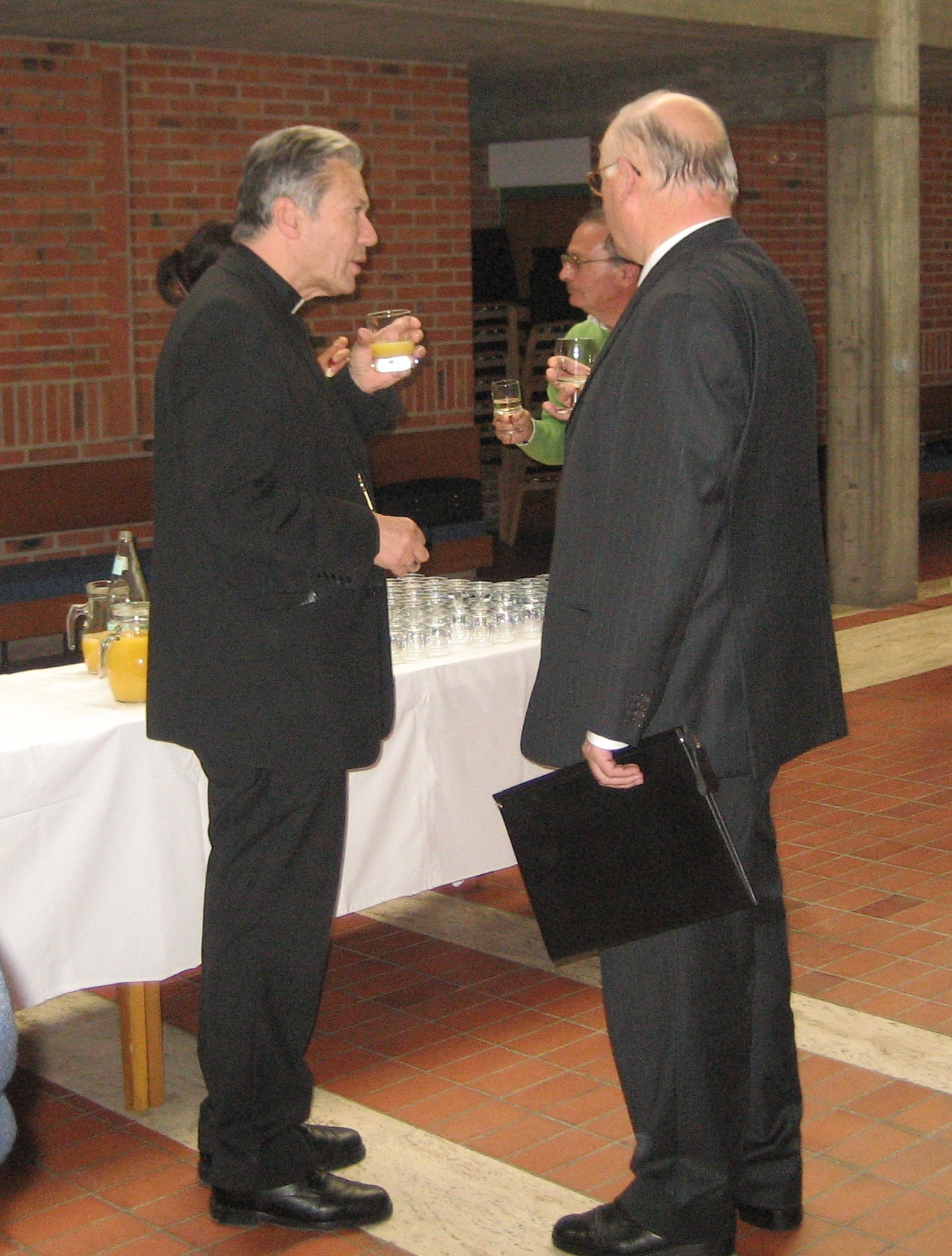
- Bishop Karl Golser (left) with Vicar General Josef Matzneller, November 2009
- Church: Catholic Church
- Diocese: Diocese of Bolzano-Brixen
- In office: 5 December 2008 – 27 July 2011
- Predecessor: Wilhelm Egger
- Successor: Ivo Muser

Orders
- Ordination: 10 October 1968 by Franjo Šeper
- Consecration: 8 March 2009 by Angelo Scola

Personal details
- Born: 16 May 1943 Tscherms, South Tyrol, Kingdom of Italy
- Died: 25 December 2016 (aged 73) Brixen, Trentino-Alto Adige/Südtirol, Italy

Karl Golser (16 May 1943, Tscherms – 25 December 2016, Brixen) was the Roman Catholic bishop of the Roman Catholic Diocese of Bolzano-Brixen, Italy. Ordained to the priesthood in 1968, Golser was named bishop in 2008 and retired in 2011 for health reasons. He died in 2016, aged 73.
