= Diocese of Bolzano-Brixen =

Roman Catholic diocese in Italy

Coordinates: 46.7158°N 11.6575°E

Diocese of Bolzano-Brixen Dioecesis Bauzanensis-Brixinensis Diözese Bozen-Brixen Diocesi di Bolzano-Bressanone

Catholic
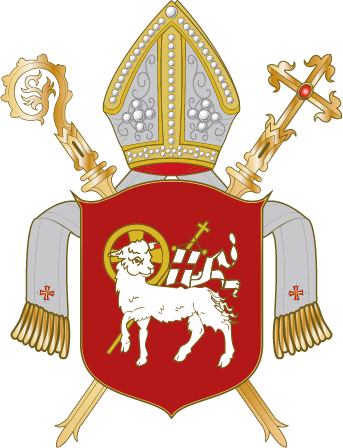

Location
- Country: Italy
- Metropolitan: Trento

Statistics
- Area: 7,400 km^{2} (2,900 sq mi)
- Population: Total; Catholics: (as of 2023); 535,774 ▲; 512,017 ▲ (95.6 ▲%)
- Parishes: 281

Information
- Rite: Roman Rite
- Established: 6th Century
- Cathedral: Cattedrale di Santa Maria Assunta e San Cassiano (Brixen)
- Co-cathedral: Duomo di Santa Maria Assunta (Bolzano)
- Secular priests: 194 (diocesan) ▼157 (Religious Orders) ▼30 Permanent Deacons ▲

Current leadership
- Pope: Leo XIV
- Bishop: Ivo Muser

Map

Website
- www.bz-bx.net

The Diocese of Bolzano-Brixen (German: Diözese Bozen-Brixen, Italian: Diocesi di Bolzano-Bressanone, Latin: Dioecesis Bauzanensis-Brixinensis) is a Latin diocese of the Catholic Church in northern Italy, with its seat in the city of Bolzano. Its territory corresponds with that of the province of South Tyrol with its predominantly German-speaking population. It is a suffragan of the Archdiocese of Trento.

The current configuration of the diocese was created by Pope Paul VI, in a papal bull of 6 August 1964, when the South Tyrolean parts of the archdiocese of Trento around Bolzano and Merano were merged into the Diocese of Brixen. In turn, the Austrian parts of the Brixen diocese around Feldkirch, Vorarlberg were at first allocated to the Apostolic Administration of Innsbruck-Felkirch, that only in 1964 was promoted as a Diocese and separated in two in 1968. The Ladin districts of Fodom (Livinallongo del Col di Lana and Colle Santa Lucia) and Anpez (Cortina d’Ampezzo) passed from Brixen to the Diocese of Belluno. At the same time the episcopal see was moved from Brixen to Bolzano, where the Assumption of Mary parish church was elevated to a co-cathedral, while the chapter remained in Brixen.

The diocesan ordinary (bishop) is Ivo Muser, appointed on 27 July 2011 by Pope Benedict XVI.

== History ==
The history of the diocese begins when the diocese was established in Säben (Sabiona) in the 6th century, and it was subject to the patriarchate of Aquileia.

On 20 April 798, on orders of Charlemagne, Pope Leo III established the new archdiocese of Salzburg, and assigned it as suffragans the dioceses of Passau, Ratisbon, Freising, Säben, and Neuburg.

It was under Bishop Albuinus (c. 974–1006), probably in 993, that the residence of the bishop and his episcopal seat were transferred from Säben to Brixen, some twelve miles to the northeast, in the same valley. The episcopal treasury, however, remained in Säben, and the church of the Holy Cross at the monastery of Säben continued to function as a cathedral of the diocese. A new cathedral was established in the church of Ss. Cassius and Ingenuinus in the monastery of the same title in Brixen. Albuin's predecessor, Richbert(us), had also lived at Brixen from time to time, but when he died he was buried with his predecessors in the cathedral of the Holy Cross in Säben.

== Synods ==
The Emperor Henry IV held a synod at Brixen, on 25 June 1080, attended by thirty bishops, including Bishop Altwin of Brixen. The synod accused Pope Gregory VII of sacrilege, perjury, homicide, and other crimes, and deposed him from his papal office. Pope Gregory replied by excommunicating the emperor and all of his supporters, including presumably Bishop Altwin of Brixen, at a synod held in Rome in February 1081.

A diocesan synod was an irregularly held, but important, meeting of the bishop of a diocese and his clergy. Its purpose was (1) to proclaim generally the various decrees already issued by the bishop; (2) to discuss and ratify measures on which the bishop chose to consult with his clergy; (3) to publish statutes and decrees of the diocesan synod, of the provincial synod, and of the Holy See.

Bishop Bruno von Bullenstetten und Kirchberg (1250–1288) presided over a diocesan synod in Brixen in 1287 or 1288. Bishop Landulfus held a diocesan synod c. 1296. Bishop Johannes Wulfing von Güttingen (1306–1322) held a synod in 1318.

A diocesan synod was held in Brixen by Bishop Christoph von Schrofenstein (1509–1521) in 1511. Bishop Christoph Andreas von Spaur (1601–1613) presided over a diocesan synod in Brixen on 23–26 September 1603.

Bishop Kaspar Ignaz von Künigl zu Ehrenburg (1703–1747) held a diocesan synod in 1710.

Bishop Simon Aichner (1884–1904) held a diocesan synod on 27–31 August 1900.

== Seminary ==
The Council of Trent, in its 23rd session in 1562, decreed that each diocese, to the extent that it was feasible, should have a diocesan seminary for the training of priests. As early as 1567, Archduke Ferdinand II and Cardinal Madruzzo began to draw up plans, but financial difficulties as well as problems with a site for the institution impeded progress. The Salzburg provincial synod of 1569 was encouraging, and again in 1576, but not with financial aid. Madruzzo's coadjutor and successor, Prince-Bishop Johann Thomas von Spaur (1578–1591), kept the plan alive, with the support of the Jesuit Peter Canisius, but still the problem was financial, even with a proposed tax on the Canons. The diocesan seminary of Brixen was finally founded by Bishop Johann Thomas Spaur in 1607, in the Kirchmayr house in the Runggad. It was not until 1764–1767 that the seminary acquired its own building.

In 1779, the cathedral church, dedicated to the taking up (Assumption) of the body of the Virgin Mary into heaven, and to Ss. Cassianus, Ingenuinus, and Albuinus, had a Chapter composed of two dignities and nineteen Canons.

On 29 September 1822, in the bull "Quae Nos Gravissimi", on a petition presented by Count Antal Apponyi, ambassador of the Emperor Francis I to the Holy See, Pope Pius VII granted the emperor the privilege of nominating the bishops of Trent and Brixen. The bull states that this was done with the consent of the Chapters of the two cathedrals (who thereby lost their right to free election of their bishop), as well as of the bishop of Brixen.

On 7 March 1825, Pope Leo XII issued the bull "Ubi Primum", in which he named Salzburg as the metropolitan of the ecclesiastical province, and assigned as suffragans the dioceses of Trent, Brixen, Gurk, Seckau, and Lavant.

== Bishops ==
=== Bishops of Säben ===
...

- Ingenuinus (attested c. 590)
- Mastalo (attested 599)

...

- Alim (attested 749–800)
- Heinrich (attested 805–828)
- Aribo (Arnbo, Arbeo)
- Wilfund
- Lantfried (c. 842 – c. 875)
- Zerito (c. 875–885)
- Zacharias (c. 890–907)
- Maginbert (907–c.925)
- Nithard (attested 925–935)

Wisant (c. 938–956??)

- Hugo (attested 952)
- Richbert (c. 960–977?)

=== Bishops of Brixen ===
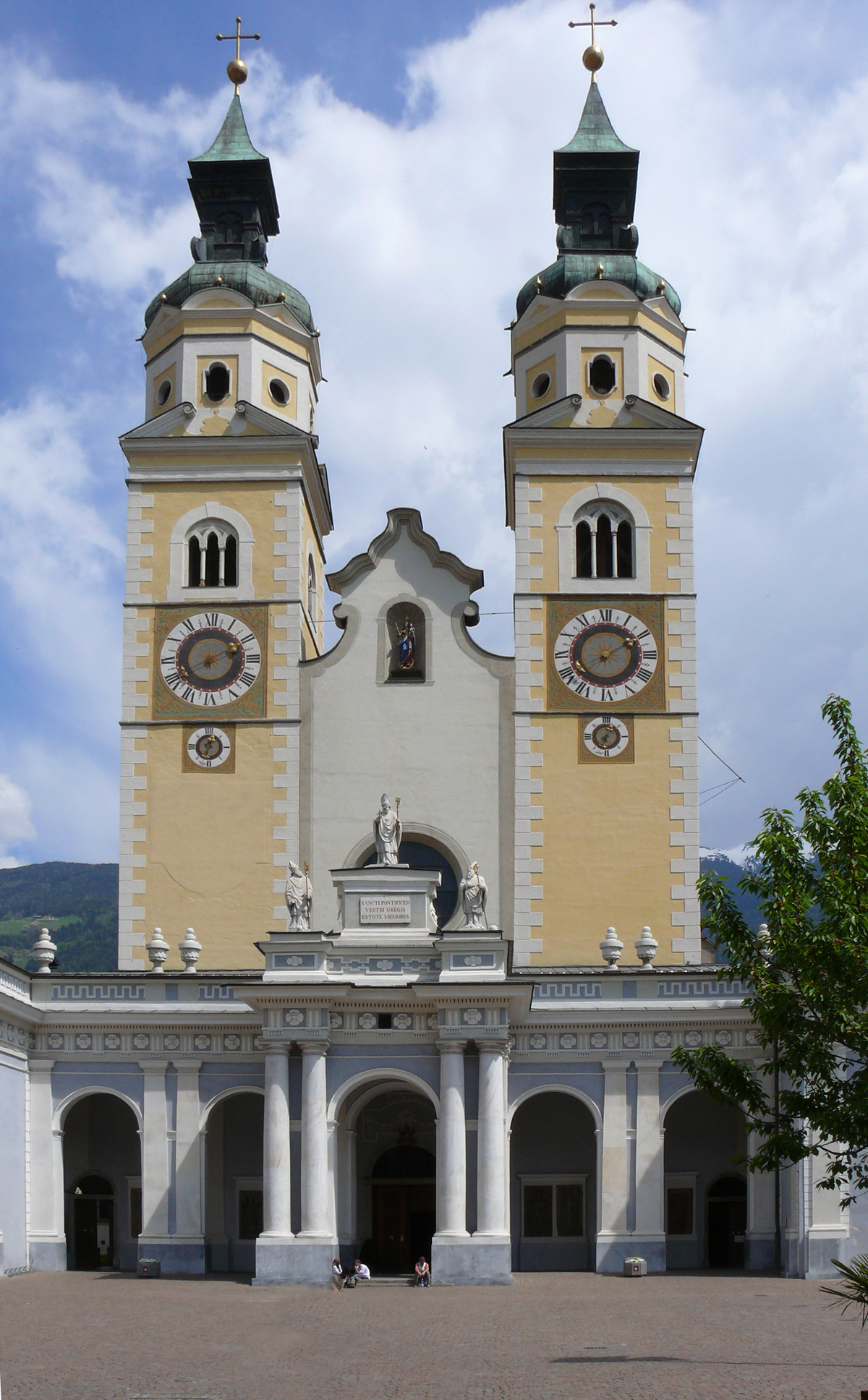
Brixen Cathedral

==== to 1200 ====
- Albuinus (c. 974–1006)
- Adalbert (attested 1011)
- Heriward
- Hartwig (attested 1027–1038)
- Poppo (1040–1048)
- Altwin (1049–1091 Resigned)
- Anto (attested 1097–1100)
- Hugo (c. 1100?–1125)
- Reginbert, O.S.B. (1125–1140)
- Hartmann von Brixen (1140–1164)
- Otto von Andechs (1165–1170 Resigned)
- Heinrich von Fügen (1170–1174)
- Richer von Hohenburg (1174–1178)
- Heinrich von Berchtesgaden (1178–1196)
- Eberhard de Truxen von Regensberg (1196–1200)

==== 1200 to 1500 ====
- Konrad von Rodeneck (1200–1217)
- Berthold von Neifen (1217–1224)
- Heinrich von Taufers (1224?–1239)
- Egno von Eppan (1240–1250)
- Bruno von Bullenstetten und Kirchberg (1250–1288)
- Heinrich von Trevejach (1290–1295)
- Landulfus (1295–1301)
- Arnoldus (attested 1302)
- Johannes Sax (attested 1303–1306)
- Johannes Wulfing von Güttingen (1306–1322)
- Konrad von Klingenberg (1322–1324) Bishop-elect
- Albert von Enn (1324–1336)
- Matthaeus (1336–1363)
- Lampertus von Brunn (1364) Bishop-elect
- Johann von Lenzburg (1364–1374)
- Friedrich von Erdlingen (1376–1396)
- Ulrich of Vienna (1396–1417)
- Sebastian Stämpfl (1417–1418)
- Berthold von Bükelsberg (1418–1427)
- Ulrich Putsch (1428–1437)
- Georg von Stubai (1437–1443)
- Johann Rottel (1444–1450)
- Nicholas of Cusa (1450–1464)
- Cardinal Francesco Gonzaga (1464–1466) Administrator
- Leo von Spaur (1469–1471)
- Georg Golser (1471–1488 Resigned)
- Melchior von Meckau (1489–1509)

==== 1500 to 1800 ====
- Christoph von Schrofenstein (1509–1521)
- Sebastian Sperantius (Sprenger) (1521–1525)
- George of Austria (1526–1538)
- Cardinal Bernhard von Cles (Clesio) (1539)
- Christoph Fuchs von Fuchsberg (1539–1542)
- Cardinal Cristoforo Madruzzo (1542–1578)
- Johann Thomas von Spaur (1578–1591)
- Andreas von Austria (1591–1600)
- Christoph Andreas von Spaur (1601–1613)
- Karl von Habsburg (1613–1624)
- Hieronymus Otto Agricola (1625–1627)
- Daniel Zeno (1627–1628)
- Wilhelm von Welsberg (1629–1641)
- Johann Platzgummer (1641–1647)
- Anton Crosini von Bonporto (1648–1663)
- Sigmund Alphons von Thun (1663–1677)
- Paulinus Mayr (1678–1685)
- Johann Franz von Khuen zu Liechtenberg (1687–1702)
- Kaspar Ignaz von Künigl zu Ehrenburg (1703–1747)
- Leopold Maria von Spaur (1748–1778)
- Ignaz Franz von Spaur (1778–1779)
- Joseph Philipp von Spaur (1780–1791)

==== since 1800 ====
- Karl Franz von Lodron (1792–1828)
- Bernhard Galura (1829–1856)
- Vinzenz Gasser (1856–1879)
- Johannes von Leiß (Leiss) (1880–1884)
- Simon Aichner (1884–1904 Resigned)
- Josef Altenweisel (1904–1912)
- Franz Egger (1912–1918)
- Johann Raffl (1921–1927)
- Josef Mutschlechner (1928–1930 Resigned)
- Johann Baptist Geisler (1930–1952 Resigned)
- Joseph Gargitter (1952–1986 Resigned)
- Wilhelm Emil Egger, O.F.M. Cap. (1986–2008)
- Karl Golser (2008–2011 Resigned)
- Ivo Muser (2011– )
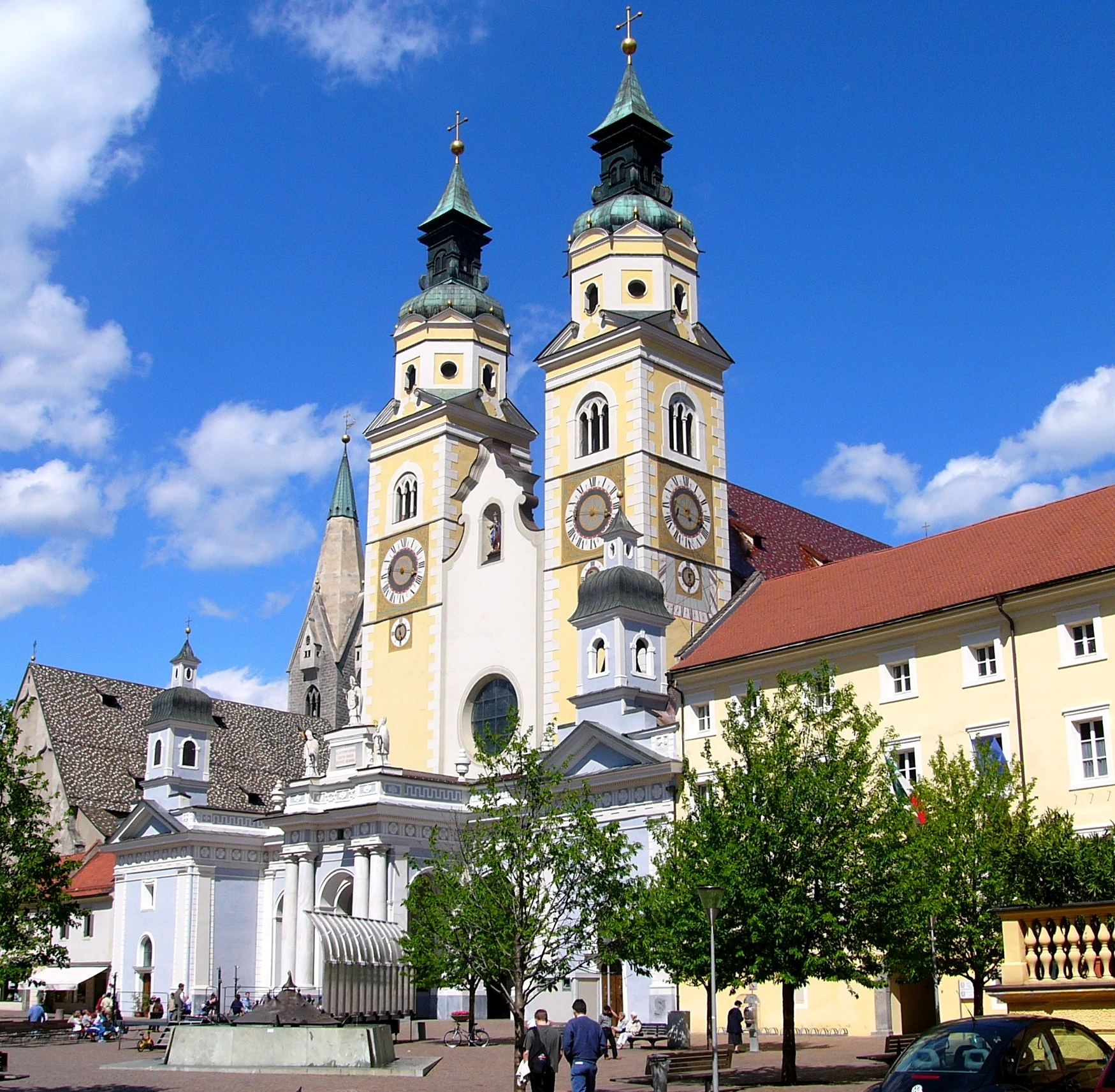
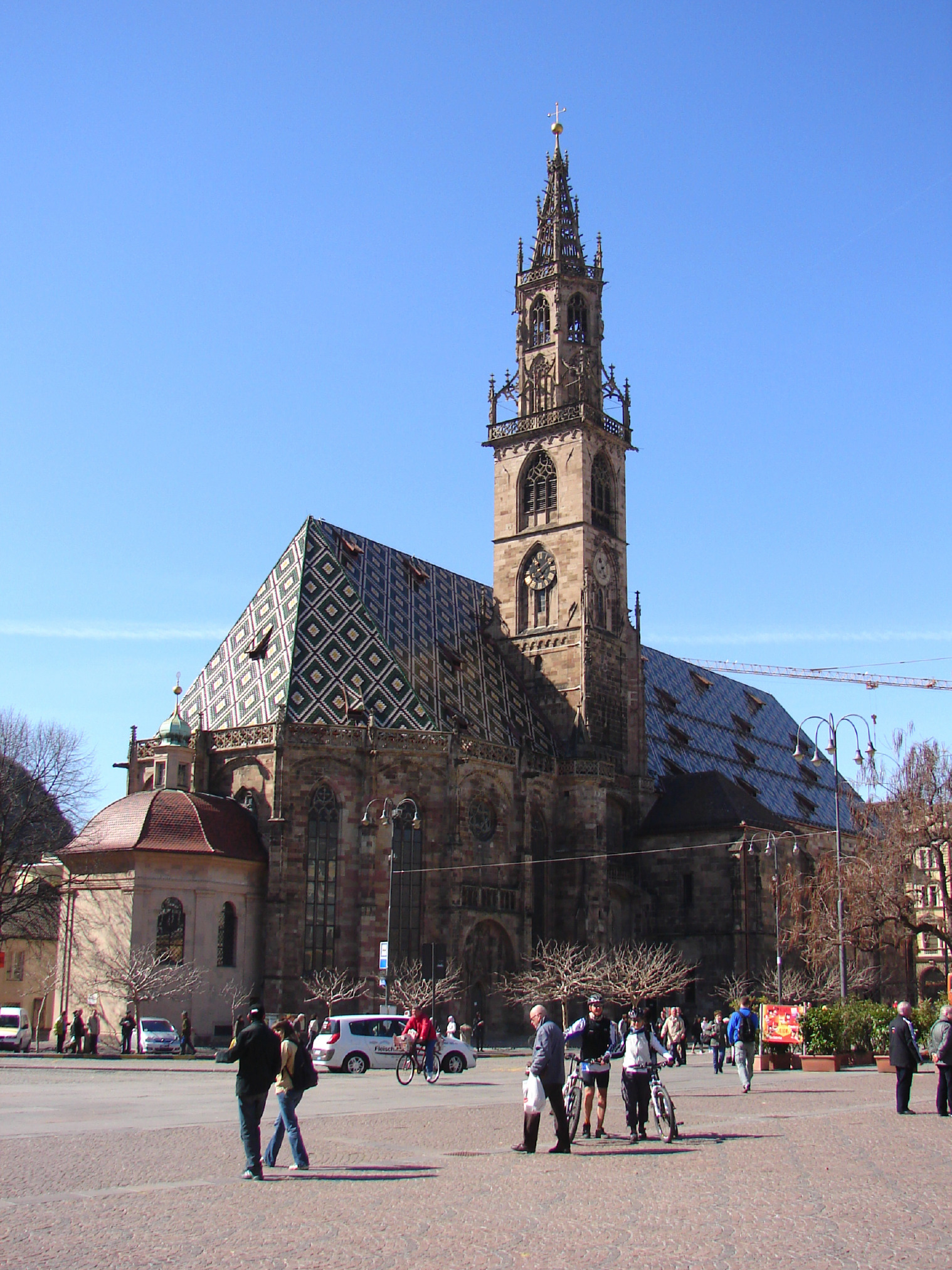
Cathedral in Brixen (left) Co-cathedral in Bolzano (right)

== Books ==
=== Episcopal lists ===
- Eubel, Conradus, ed. (1913). Hierarchia catholica (in Latin). Vol. Tomus 1 (second ed.). Münster: Libreria Regensbergiana.
- Eubel, Conradus, ed. (1914). Hierarchia catholica (in Latin). Vol. Tomus 2 (second ed.). Münster: Libreria Regensbergiana.
- Gulik, Guilelmus (1923). Eubel, Conradus (ed.). Hierarchia catholica (in Latin). Vol. Tomus 3 (second ed.). Münster: Libreria Regensbergiana.
- Gams, Pius Bonifatius (1873). Series episcoporum Ecclesiae catholicae: quotquot innotuerunt a beato Petro apostolo (in Latin). Ratisbon: Typis et Sumptibus Georgii Josephi Manz. pp. 265–266.
- Gauchat, Patritius (Patrice) (1935). Hierarchia catholica (in Latin). Vol. Tomus IV (1592-1667). Münster: Libraria Regensbergiana.
- Ritzler, Remigius; Sefrin, Pirminus (1952). Hierarchia catholica medii et recentis aevi (in Latin). Vol. Tomus V (1667-1730). Patavii: Messagero di S. Antonio.
- Ritzler, Remigius; Sefrin, Pirminus (1958). Hierarchia catholica medii et recentis aevi (in Latin). Vol. Tomus VI (1730-1799). Patavii: Messagero di S. Antonio.
- Ritzler, Remigius; Sefrin, Pirminus (1968). Hierarchia Catholica medii et recentioris aevi (in Latin). Vol. VII (1800–1846). Monasterii: Libreria Regensburgiana.
- Ritzler, Remigius; Sefrin, Pirminus (1978). Hierarchia catholica Medii et recentioris aevi (in Latin). Vol. VIII (1846–1903). Il Messaggero di S. Antonio.
- Pięta, Zenon (2002). Hierarchia catholica medii et recentioris aevi (in Latin). Vol. IX (1903–1922). Padua: Messagero di San Antonio. ISBN 978-88-250-1000-8.

=== Studies ===
- Brackmann, Albert (1911). Germania pontificia Vol. I: Provincia Salisburgensis et Episcopatus Tridentinus. Berlin: Weidmann. (in Latin) pp. 140–153.
- Gelmi, Josef (1984). Die Brixner Bischöfe in der Geschichte Tirols (in German). Bozen: Athesia. ISBN 978-88-7014-362-1.
- Hauck, Albert (1896). Kirchengeschichte Deutschlands (in German). Vol. Dritter Teil. Leipzig: J.C. Hinrichs'sche Buchhandlung. pp. 994–995.
- Mooyer, Ernst Friedrich (1854). Oncmasticon chronographikon Hierarchiæ Germanicæ. Verzeichniss der deutschen Bischöfe seit dem Jahre 800 (in Latin). Minden. pp. 19–20.
- Redlich, Oswald (1884). "Zur Geschichte der Bischöfe von Brixen vom 10. bis in das 12. Jahrhundert (907–1125)." in: Zeitschrift des Ferdinandeums fur Tirol und Vorarlberg (in German). Vol. 28. Innsbruck: Wagner. 1884. pp. 1–52.
- Resch(ius), Joseph (1765). Monumenta veteris Ecclesiae Brixinensis quae sub clementissimis auspiciis: eminentissimi, & celsissimi principis Christophori Bartholomaei e comitibus migazziis &c. &c (in Latin). Brixen: J. Krapf.
- Resch(ius), Josephus (1767). Annales ecclesiae Sabionensis nunc Brixinensis atque conterminarum (in Latin). Vol. Tomus II. Vienna: Mauracher.
- Schaller, H. (1898). Genealogie de la Maison des Comtes Spaur de Flavon & Valör au Tyrol Meridional. Fribourg 1898. (in German)
- Sinnacher, Franz Anton. Beyträge zur Geschichte der bischöflichen Kirche Säben und Brixen in Tyrol. 9 vols. Brixen: Joseph Weger 1821–1835. (in German) [Fraktur]

- Sinnacher, Franz Anton (1822). Beyträge zur Geschichte der bischöflichen Kirche Säben und Brixen in Tyrol. (10th-11th cent.) (in German). Vol. II. Band, ii. Heft. Brixen: Weger.
- Sinnacher, Franz Anton (1822). Beyträge zur Geschichte der bischöflichen Kirche Säben und Brixen in Tyrol. (1000-1100) (in German). Vol. II. Band, iii Heft. Brixen: Weger.
- Sinnacher, Franz Anton (1823). Beyträge zur Geschichte der bischöflichen Kirche Säben und Brixen in Tyrol. (1100-1200) (in German). Vol. III. Band, i Heft. Brixen: Weger.
- Sinnacher, Franz Anton (1823). Beyträge zur Geschichte der bischöflichen Kirche Säben und Brixen in Tyrol. (1100-1200) (in German). Vol. III. Band, ii Heft. Brixen: Weger.
- Sinnacher, Franz Anton (1824). Beyträge zur Geschichte der bischöflichen Kirche Säben und Brixen in Tyrol. (1100–1200) (in German). Vol. III. Band, iii Heft. Brixen: Weger.
- Sinnacher, Franz Anton (1824). Beyträge zur Geschichte der bischöflichen Kirche Säben und Brixen in Tyrol. (1200-1300) (in German). Vol. IV. Band, i Heft. Brixen: Weger.
- Sinnacher, Franz Anton (1825). Beyträge zur Geschichte der bischöflichen Kirche Säben und Brixen in Tyrol: ¬Die Kirche Brixen im 1200 - 1300 Jahrhunderte. (1200-1300) (in German). Vol. IV. Band, ii. Heft. Brixen: Weger.
- Sinnacher, Franz Anton (1826). Beyträge zur Geschichte der bischöflichen Kirche Säben und Brixen in Tyrol. (1200-1300) (in German). Vol. IV. Band, iii Heft. Brixen: Weger.
- Sinnacher, Franz Anton (1827). Beyträge zur Geschichte der bischöflichen Kirche Säben und Brixen in Tyrol. (13th-14th cent.) (in German). Vol. V. Band, i. Heft. Brixen: Weger.
- Sinnacher, Franz Anton (1828). Beyträge zur Geschichte der bischöflichen Kirche Säben und Brixen in Tyrol. (15th cent.) (in German). Vol. VI. Band, i. Heft. Brixen: Weger.
- Sinnacher, Franz Anton (1833). Beyträge zur Geschichte der bischöflichen Kirche Säben und Brixen in Tyrol. (1600-1700) (in German). Vol. VIII. Band, iii Heft. Brixen: Weger.

== See also ==
- Prince-Bishopric of Brixen
