= Karl Franz von Lodron =

Prince-Bishop of Brixen

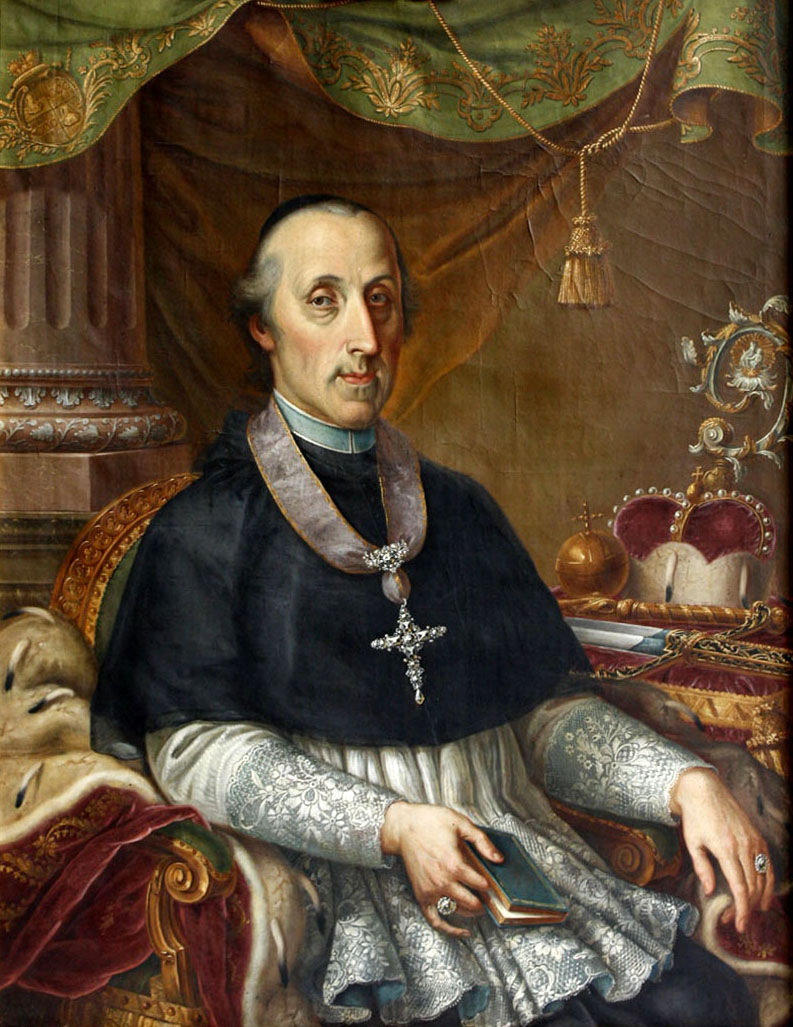

Count Karl Franz von Lodron (18 November 1748–10 August 1828) was the last prince-bishop of Brixen. He was ordained as a priest in 1771 and as bishop in 1792, retaining the position until his death.
