= Bernhard Galura =

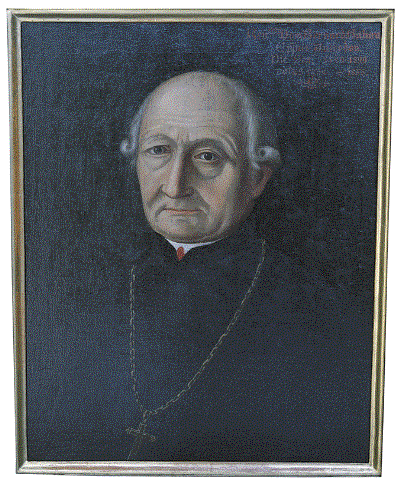
Portrait of Bernard Galura (1840)

Bernhard Galura (21 August 1764, at Herbolzheim, Breisgau – 17 May 1856 at Brixen) was a Prince-Bishop of Brixen.

== Life ==
After he had completed his classical studies in his native town he entered the convent of the Friars Minor at Altbreisach, but because of its suppression by Holy Roman Emperor Joseph II, his stay here was of short duration. In 1783 he entered the seminary of Freiburg where, after a brilliant course in the ecclesiastical sciences, he was honoured with the doctorate of Theology. He was ordained priest in 1788 in the seminary of Vienna whither he had gone to follow a course of practical theology. In the same year he returned to the seminary of Freiburg, and after acting as prefect of studies for two years he took up parochial work, first at Altoberndorf and later in the cathedral of Freiburg. Recognizing in him a man of learning and sound judgment, Emperor Francis appointed him in 1805 spiritual referee at Günzburg, but owing to political changes he lost his position here, and ten years later was assigned to the same duty at Innsbruck. In 1819 he became Vicar-General of Vorarlberg. On 30 January 1820, he was consecrated auxiliary bishop of Brixen, and nine years later took formal possession of the chair of St. Cassian as Bishop of Brixen.

Like his predecessors, Galura directed all his efforts towards safeguarding the unity of the Catholic faith in his diocese. By the establishment of missions and educational institutions and by the introduction of religious orders, especially the Jesuits (who had been banished from there) and the Sisters of Mercy (in 1838), he succeeded in restoring much of what the secular power had destroyed during the administration of his predecessor. He was highly respected by the civil authorities, and his deeply religious spirit, his charity towards the poor, and his administrative abilities have made him an ornament to his church and country.

== Works ==
Besides numerous ascetical, homiletical, and catechetical works, he wrote also:

- Sokratische Katechisirmethode (1796)
- Christkatholische Religion (5 vols., Augsburg, 1796–1800)
- Lehrbuch der Christlichen Wohlgezogenheit (Augsburg, 1841)
