= Anselm Sparber =

The Reverend Anselm Sparber
- Church: Catholic Church (Italy)
- Province: Trento
- Diocese: Bolzano-Brixen

Personal details
- Born: 13 May 1883 Stilfes, County of Tyrol, Austria-Hungary (now Freienfeld, Italy)
- Died: 26 November 1969 (aged 86) Mals, South Tyrol, Italy

Anselm Sparber (May 13, 1883 – November 26, 1969) was a South Tyrolean Catholic priest, theologian, and religious author.

== Early life ==
Anselm Sparber, from the hamlet Egg, was ordained a priest in 1909. He was assigned to a parish in Fiè am Schlern and Natz, later becoming a vicar in Falzes. He worked as a teacher at Vinzentinum, and from 1933 he was a Professor of ecclesiastical and diocesan history at the Philosophical-theological College Brixen,. In 1939, he was appointed director of the diocesan archives of Brixen and consistorial councilor.

Anselm Sparber wrote numerous works on the church and local history of South Tyrol.

== Works ==
- Abriss der Geschichte des Chorherrensiftes Neustift bei Brixen (1920),
- Die Marienwallfahrt Trens (1928).

== Awards ==
- Badge of honor of South Tyrol
- Award of Walther-von-der-Vogelweide
- honorary member of University of Innsbruck
- a street was named after him in the center of Pfalzen
