= Passive rewilding =

Previously inhabited areas reclaimed by vegetation and wildlife

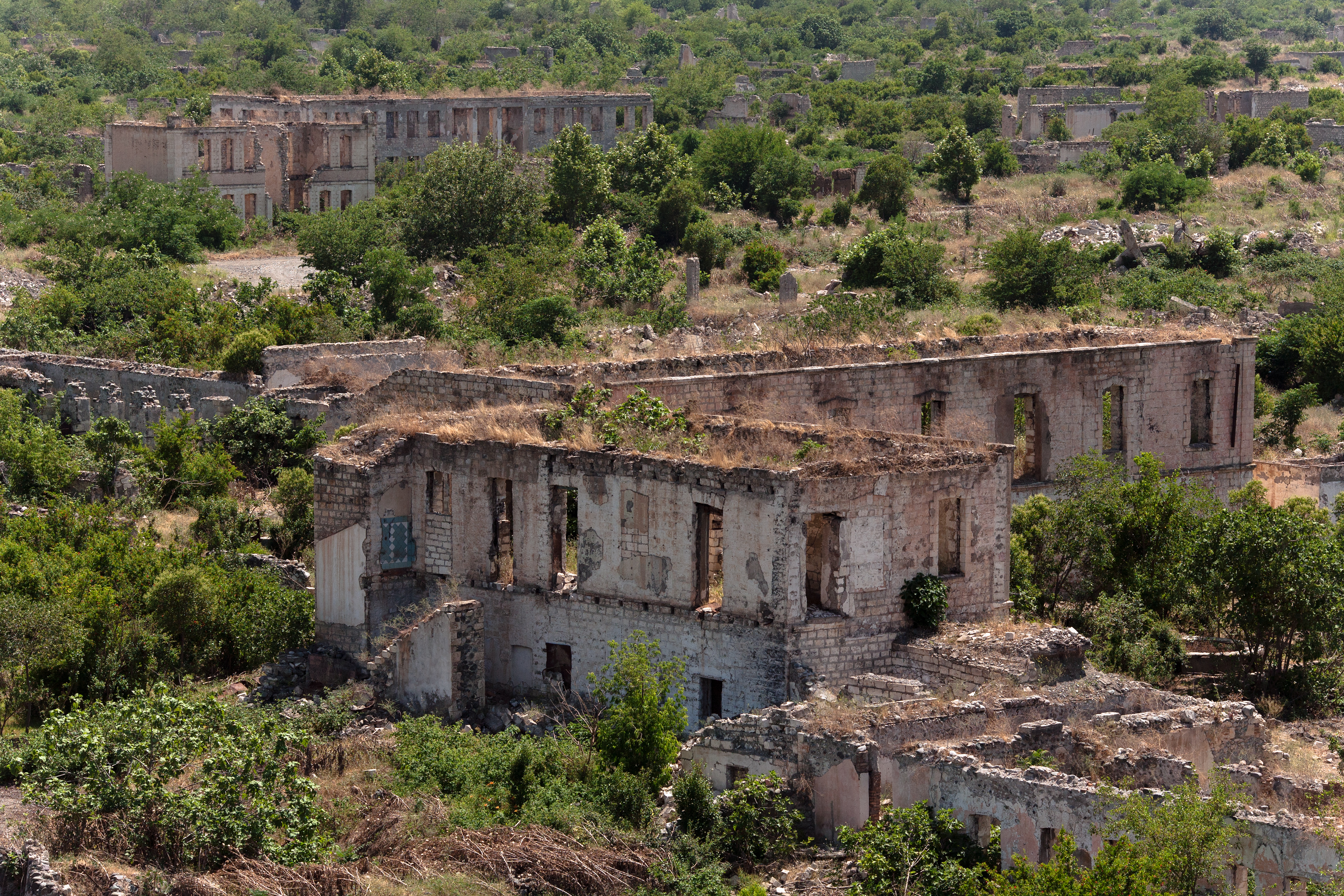
Passive rewilding can occur in an urban environment that is left to ruin.

Passive rewilding refers to actively unmanaged environments that are allowed to regain natural dominance, typically after their abandonment. A type of rewilding, passive rewilding aims to restore natural ecosystem processes via minimal or the total withdrawal of direct human management of the landscape. Passive rewilding allows natural processes to restore themselves, and enables a particular level of chaos as woodlands reclaim land, species return and ecological disturbances like wildfires, pests, and floods contribute to the area.

Sometimes referred to as natural regeneration, spontaneous regeneration, and, informally, as nature's reclamation, it differs from other forms of rewilding in that direct human management or intervention is absent, whereby the environment is subsequently overgrown and occupied by natural elements on its own. In 1998, science fiction author Bruce Sterling coined the term involuntary park to describe previously inhabited areas that for environmental, economic, or political reasons have lost their value for technological functionalism and been allowed to return to an overgrown, feral state.

Passive rewilding includes abandoned human settlements and developments, such as post-agricultural lands for instance, that are intentionally left undisturbed and later become spontaneously overtaken by foliage and wild animals. Such occurrences are known to exist in numerous locations around the world. Degraded or abandoned land is actually the forefront of a global reforestation.

== Ecological processes ==
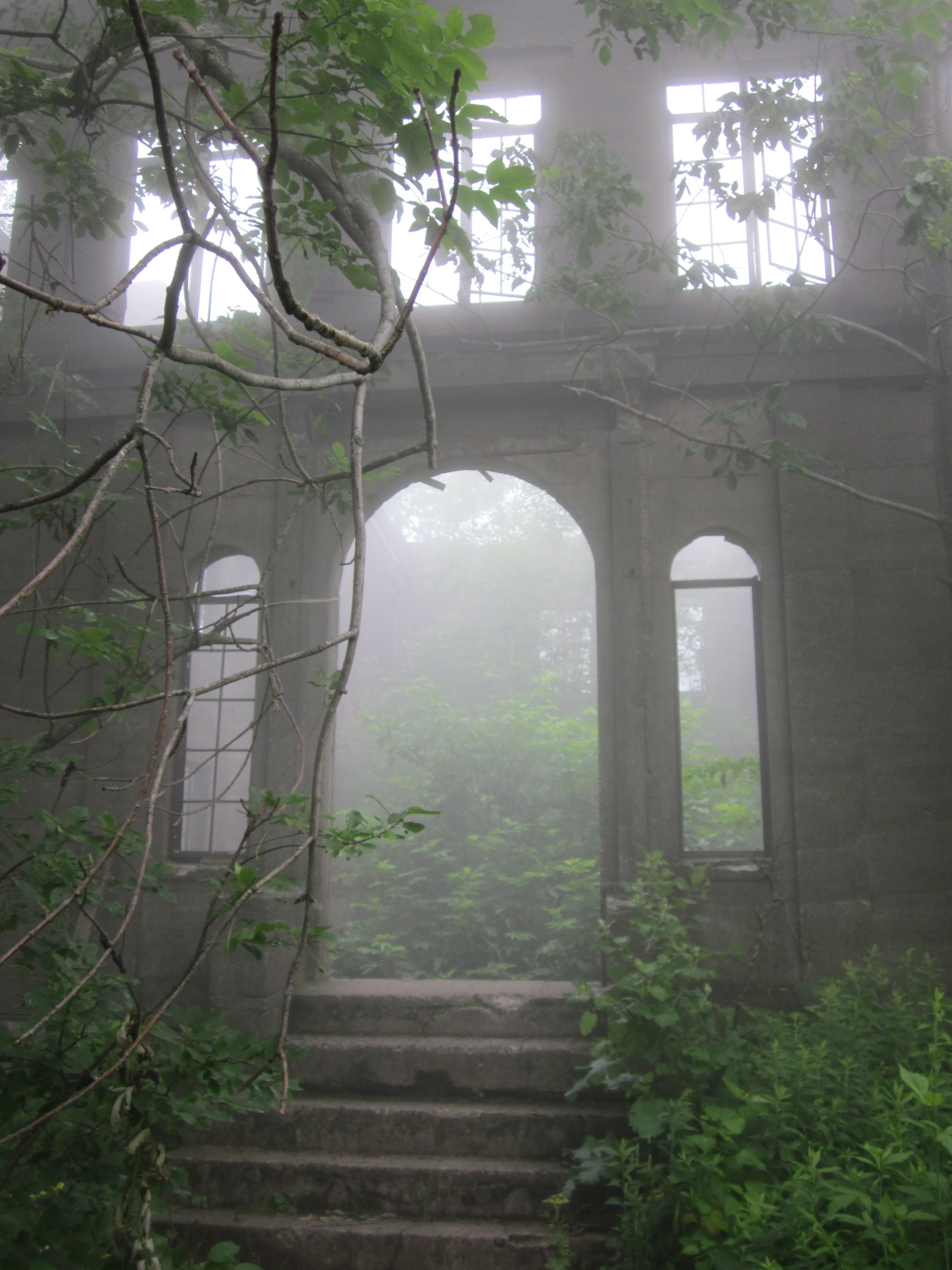
Overlook Mountain at Woodstock, New York, left to be recolonized by nature

There are three important factors to passive rewilding; Reviving trophic complexity, or biodiversity, by allowing wildlife to return (such as by limiting hunting), though in other cases it may involve resettlement. The second factor is allowing landscapes to rejoin, so in a way that plants and animals can travel around. The third component is permitting erratic disturbances such as fires, pests and floods. However, allowing nature run haphazardly and being left to chance is unacceptable to the traditional methods of ecological restoration and can be a complicated matter to accept for westerners. Passive rewilding may also expand to any area of formerly actively managed land (either rural or urban) that is currently experiencing extremely limited active management or none at all. Structures occupying urban areas that have been demolished, leaving patchy areas of green space that are usually untended and unmanaged, form an involuntary park.

Passive rewilding is a capable method for expanding tree cover and restoring biodiversity through the means of abandoning land management and permitting natural vegetation succession to occur for the restoration of natural habitats and biodiversity, expand native forest, and to increase ecosystem services and strength, and as well as for scientific research. Land is abandoned to passive rewilding either purposely, or due to socio-economic change. A strong argument in favor of passive rewilding is the minimal cost approaches to restoration, particularly on a large scale. Although widespread forest growth can transform into a homogenous landscape, biodiversity generally declines as homogeneity increases. Garden plants that escape gardens and rewild the surrounding areas are called escaped plants. These may have detrimental effects on native species and communities, in addition to being weedy and invasive.

=== Natural forest regeneration ===
Forest recovery has been occurring in abandoned pastures, scrubby bush and forest margins throughout Europe and North America, since nature abhors an ecological vacuum and therefore hastily fills it. Passive rewilding as de-management may benefit ecosystems in the United Kingdom as it liberates resources and leads to ecological consequences which benefit both wild nature and society. Evidence allows for short-medium term prognoses in passive rewilding sites in Western Europe. The abandonment of agricultural land use practices drives the natural establishment of forests through ecological succession in Spain. This spontaneous forest establishment has several consequences for society and nature, such as increase of fire risk and frequency and biodiversity loss. Regarding biodiversity loss, research findings from the Mediterranean basin showed that this is very site-dependent. More recently, the abandonment of land is also discussed by some as an opportunity for rewilding in rural areas in Spain.

Removing sheep is one of the first steps in passive rewilding in Britain, as they can eradicate wildflowers and other essential species. Though old pig breeds can remain as a substitute for wild boars. If there is a scarcity of plants, these species are replanted to promote their spread. Fences are also removed and wetlands are created, in addition to removing non-native species. In Portugal, grazing animals such as the bison can clear land and establish open areas where biodiversity can thrive, whereas wild boars may disturb the soil as they search for food. In Britain, farmland bird species decreased as passive rewilding progressed, although woodland birds increased. In the process of passive rewilding, thorny shrub bushes covered 53% of the site in Britain, and former hedges became degraded. Passive rewilding may also occur in an urban prairie, which is a vacant urban land that has been restored to green space, although rewilding here is not always passive as many urban prairies tend to be managed.

== Rewilding abandoned sites ==
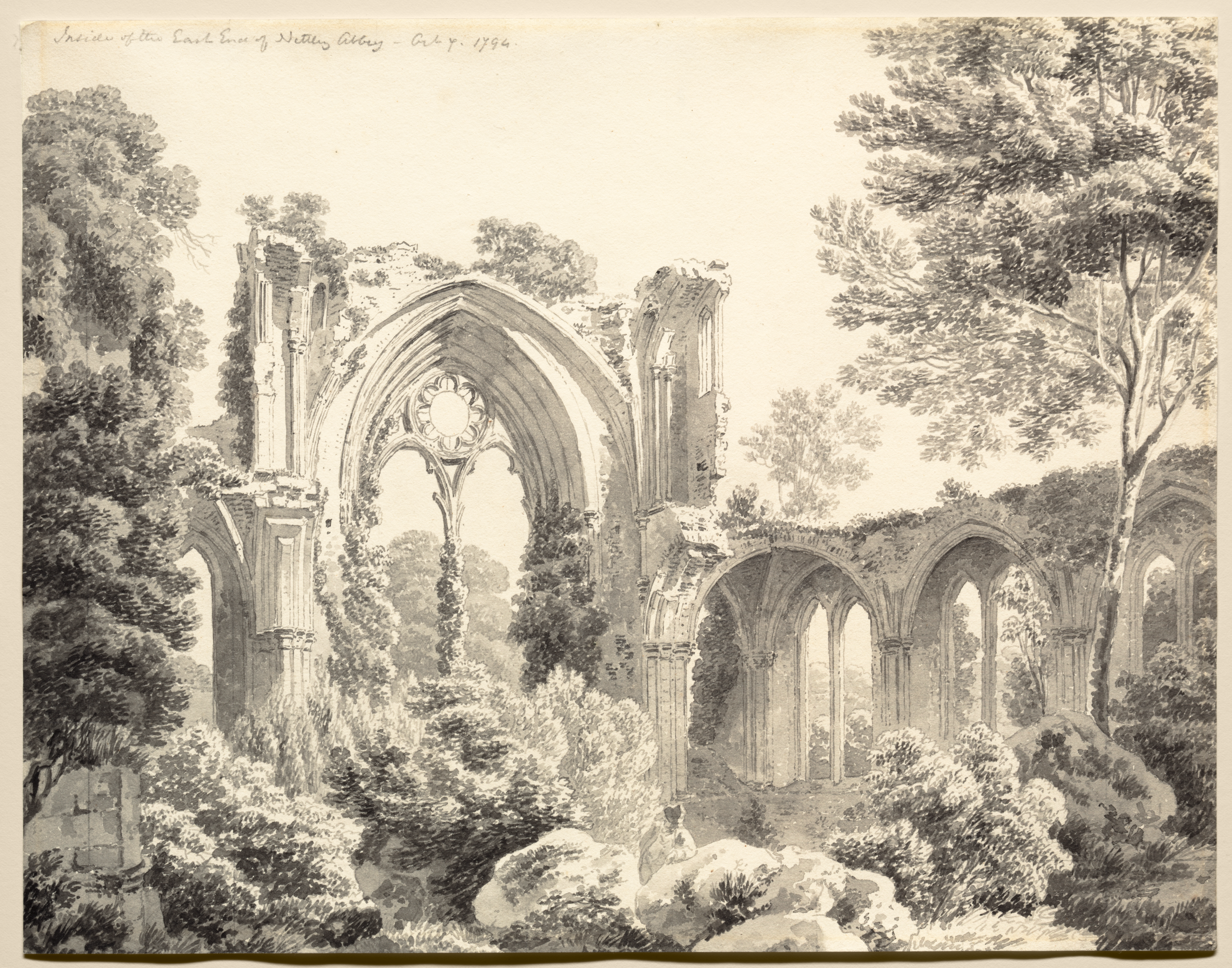
Interior view of Netley Abbey, by Michael Angelo Rooker (late 18th century), capturing the Romantic fascination with ivy-clad medieval ruins.

Involuntary parks where human presence is severely limited can host animal species that are otherwise extremely threatened in their range. When such parks develop in an urban or formerly urban location, it may become the target of urban exploration for hobbyists. The aesthetics of nature's reclamation of urban buildings has acquired the attention of artists, photographers and architects alike. Observers are attracted to seeing nature rewilding decaying structures such as broken windows, cracks on the walls, and other spaces built by man. Enthusiasts view such natural reclamation of neglected areas as inspirational and poetic, as it serves as a reminder of impermanence and how beauty exists even in decay. Regarding involuntary parks, Sterling states:

The continent's imperiled rims has become a new kind of landscape — the involuntary park. They are not representations of untouched nature, but of vengeful nature... Abandoned areas of the planet can no longer "revert to Nature" as they once supposedly did. Instead, they must revert to Next Nature, becoming weird "involuntary parks" such as the Cypriot Green Line, a long, human-free strip of flammable weeds and weed-trees, junkyards and landmines.

Abandoned towns, villages, farmlands, disused railways, mines, quarries and airfields, or areas experiencing urban decay and deindustrialization, may be subject to a resurgence in ecological proliferation and rewilding as human presence is reduced. Wildlife will rebound and reclaim abandoned human structures in such zones, when given the chance. This opportunity is as basic as humans leaving a place to be regenerated by nature. While Bruce Sterling's original vision of an involuntary park was of places abandoned due to collapse of economy or rising sea level, the term has come to be used on any land where human inhabitation or use for one reason or another has been stopped.

Other man-made environments that can be swarming with new ecosystems include temple ruins, areas considered dangerous due to pollution, abandoned theme parks, shipwrecks, military exclusion zones/exclusion zones and abandoned vehicles. In urban areas, moss covers disintegrating buildings, sand dunes or vegetation engulf entire houses, and trees and animals scramble over former walkways. After a lack of maintenance in buildings, the elements freely impact the structures, therefore roofs degenerate and permit rain to seep in, and walls fracture, allowing roots to permeate, and spaces open up to create fortuities for seeds to root. The walls and floors ultimately become habitats for wildlife, while windows and roofs turn into sanctuaries.

== Regional examples ==
=== Africa ===
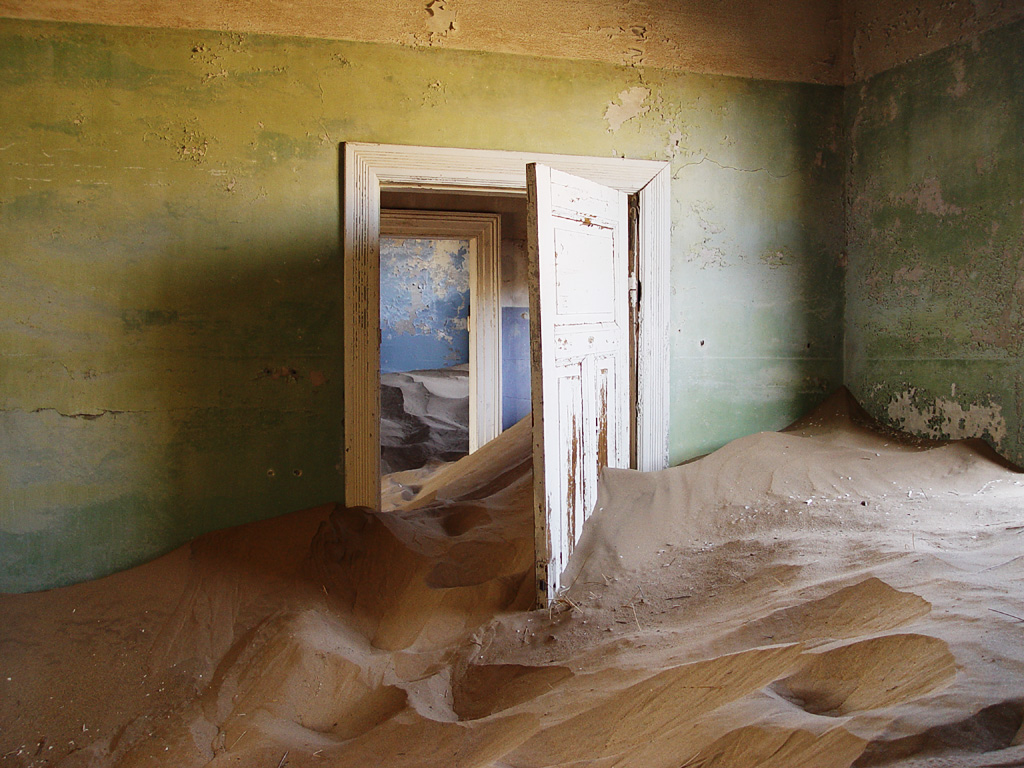
Sand reclaiming a house in Elizabeth Bay, Namibia

The ruins of Sabratha in Libya are undergoing severe coastal erosion, with the public baths, the olive-press building, and the 'harbor' showing the most damage as their structures have crumbled due to storms and unsettled seas, while rising sea levels further compromise the integrity of the site. Wildflowers have overgrown the Timgad ruins in Algeria. Olive trees and wildflowers have reclaimed the Roman ruins of Dougga in Tunisia.

After Kolmanskop and Elizabeth Bay in Namibia were abandoned by 1956, the homes in the villages became filled and eventually submerged in sand. The wreck of the Eduard Bohlen in Namibia has been largely engulfed by sand. Plaatjieskraal in South Africa, once farmland, has since been overtaken by sand dunes, with renosterveld flora now dominating the area.

=== Oceania ===
Gladesville Mental Hospital (formerly the Tarban Creek Lunatic Asylum) on the Lower North Shore features vegetation that cloaks its decaying walls. The marooned wreck of SS Ayrfield in Parramatta River in Homebush has become a mangrove forest, and is therefore a protected marine vegetation critical for fish habitat. Paronella Park in Queensland is an involuntary park featuring a concrete castle now overrun by trees and weeds. The remains of SS Yongala off the coast of Queensland is now home to hundreds of various species, that include loggerhead turtles, marbled electric rays, bull sharks and moray eels. The Montebello Islands, the site of three British atmospheric nuclear weapons tests in 1952 and 1956, are now involuntary parks that underwent passive rewilding.

In a village at Mangapurua Valley, New Zealand, historical farming and gardening efforts by soldiers and families indicates that most of the homes, culverts and farms in the Valley are now overrun with grass and marshes, with some fruit and rose trees surviving, indicating historical human presence. Land Information New Zealand (LINZ) permits the vacant residential red zone—now functioning as an involuntary park—in Christchurch, which suffered severe damage in the 2010 and 2011 Christchurch earthquakes, to be used temporarily (for up to five years) for activities such as community gardening, mountain biking, and beekeeping.

=== Asia ===
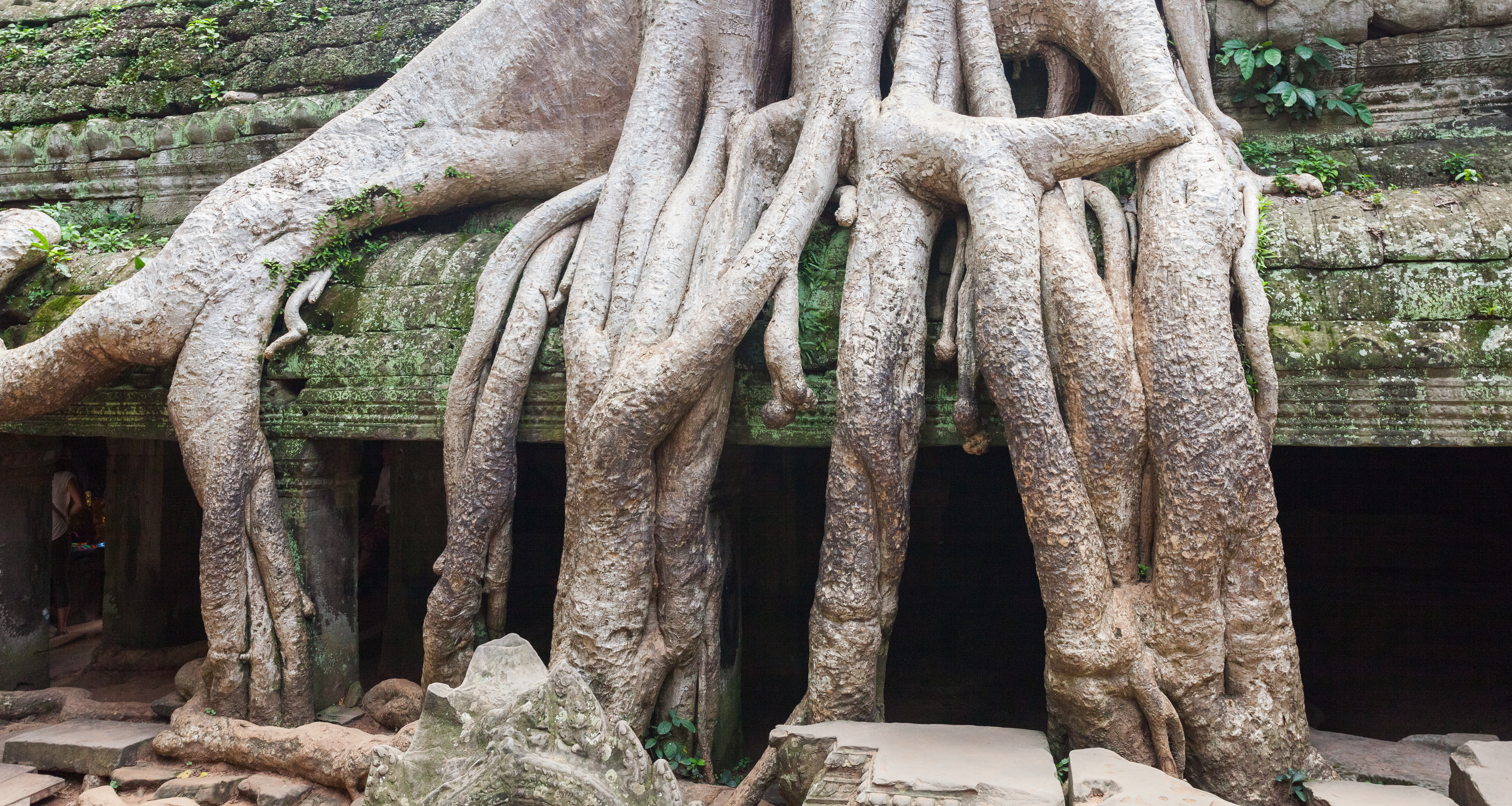
Roots of a Tetrameles tree reclaiming parts of Ta Prohm

Abandoned homes in the Fukushima Exclusion Zone are reclaimed by plant life, and the fauna there include Japanese macaques, common raccoon dogs, Japanese serow and red foxes. Apartment blocks in Hashima Island, Japan are now overwhelmed with weeds, and dense vegetation hang off their dilapidated balconies. Hachijo Royal Resort on Hachijō-jima is an abandoned luxury hotel built in the 1960s that is now overgrown and severely dilapidated. The Korean Demilitarized Zone is hypothesized to house not only Korean tigers, but also the critically endangered Amur leopard, although neither have been photographed there since the late 20th century. The once-bustling village of Houtouwan in China has been entirely reclaimed by foliage plants after residents began to leave it in the 1990s. The village is also a tourist site now, where visitors can tour the abandoned, museum-like buildings.

Ta Prohm, a 12th century temple in Cambodia, has been reclaimed by large fig, banyan and kapok trees whose roots wrap the temple walls. In Hong Kong, aerial roots of over 1,100 banyan trees attach to walls and protrude through pavements and stone walls. Once called the 'Poison Gas Island', the island of Ōkunoshima houses a thousand rabbits. Ross Island, South Andaman district, India, is largely abandoned and rewilding has occurred in the area, with forests retaking the island. The New World Department Store in Bangkok was colonized by fish such as koi, carp, and catfish that flourished from the rainwater that filled the building, before the water was drained in 2015. Ujung Kulon National Park in Java formed itself on farmland devastated and depopulated by the 1883 eruption of Krakatoa; it is now a maintained national park.

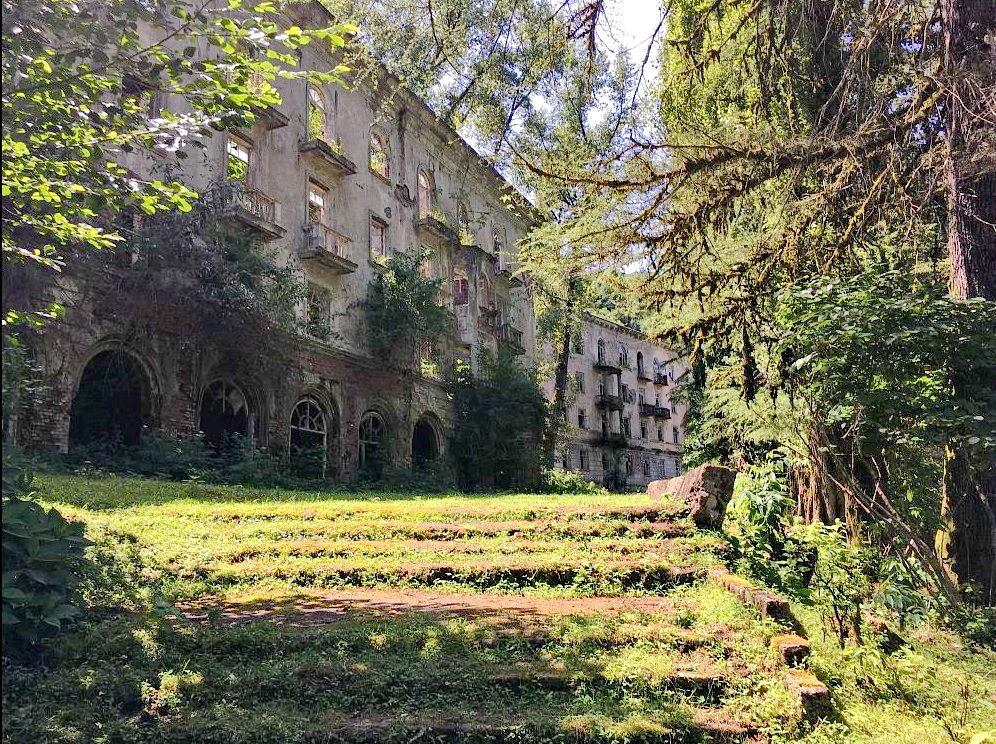
Apartments in Abkhazia becoming green walls as they are reclaimed by vegetation

Areas of the Golan Heights between Israel, Syria, Lebanon, and Jordan have become a haven for Indian wolves, mountain gazelles, wild boars, vultures, and other species due to minefields that prevent human access. The Al Madam village in the United Arab Emirates is a ghost town that is being reclaimed by the desert. The abandoned town of Akarmara, in Abkhazia, is gradually being absorbed by the natural world, where forests are reclaiming the remaining apartments, and animals such as cows and pigs are found roaming the area. The town of Agdam, Azerbaijan that was abandoned after the First Nagorno-Karabakh War has been overgrown with grasses and weeds. The closed off United Nations Buffer Zone in Cyprus has become a haven for wildlife.

=== Northern Europe ===
Inchkeith in Scotland was a military defense for over 500 years and now it is home to seal pups, eider duck and European cave spiders. The island of Swona still has cattle roaming after the inhabitants left the area in the early 1980s. Canvey Wick in Essex now features 300 species of moths and insects due to passive rewilding. A former slate quarry in Wales was one of the largest producers of slate in the world before shutting down in 1969, and nature has consequentially been reclaiming the land.

Chatterley Whitfield, which was a bustling coal mine in Staffordshire, England, is now reclaimed by buddleia, sunflowers, in addition to rabbits, foxes and badgers. Stack Rock Fort, Wales, is abandoned and reclaimed by plant life and sea birds. Nunhead Cemetery, established in the Victorian era, is now occupied by green ring-necked parakeets, a fungus called dead man's fingers, and blackberry bushes growing on the graves. The once-comprehensively farmed Knepp Castle Estate in West Sussex is now a habitat to numerous rare species. Closed in 1999, Plaza cinema in Wales has been reclaimed by trees. On Channelsea Island, a series of derelict buildings have been reclaimed by nature. After its abandonment, Netley Abbey near Southampton, England, fell into neglect and became overgrown with trees and ivy. By the late 18th century, the ruins were largely roofless and covered in vegetation, contributing to their reputation as a picturesque romantic ruin.

=== Southern Europe ===
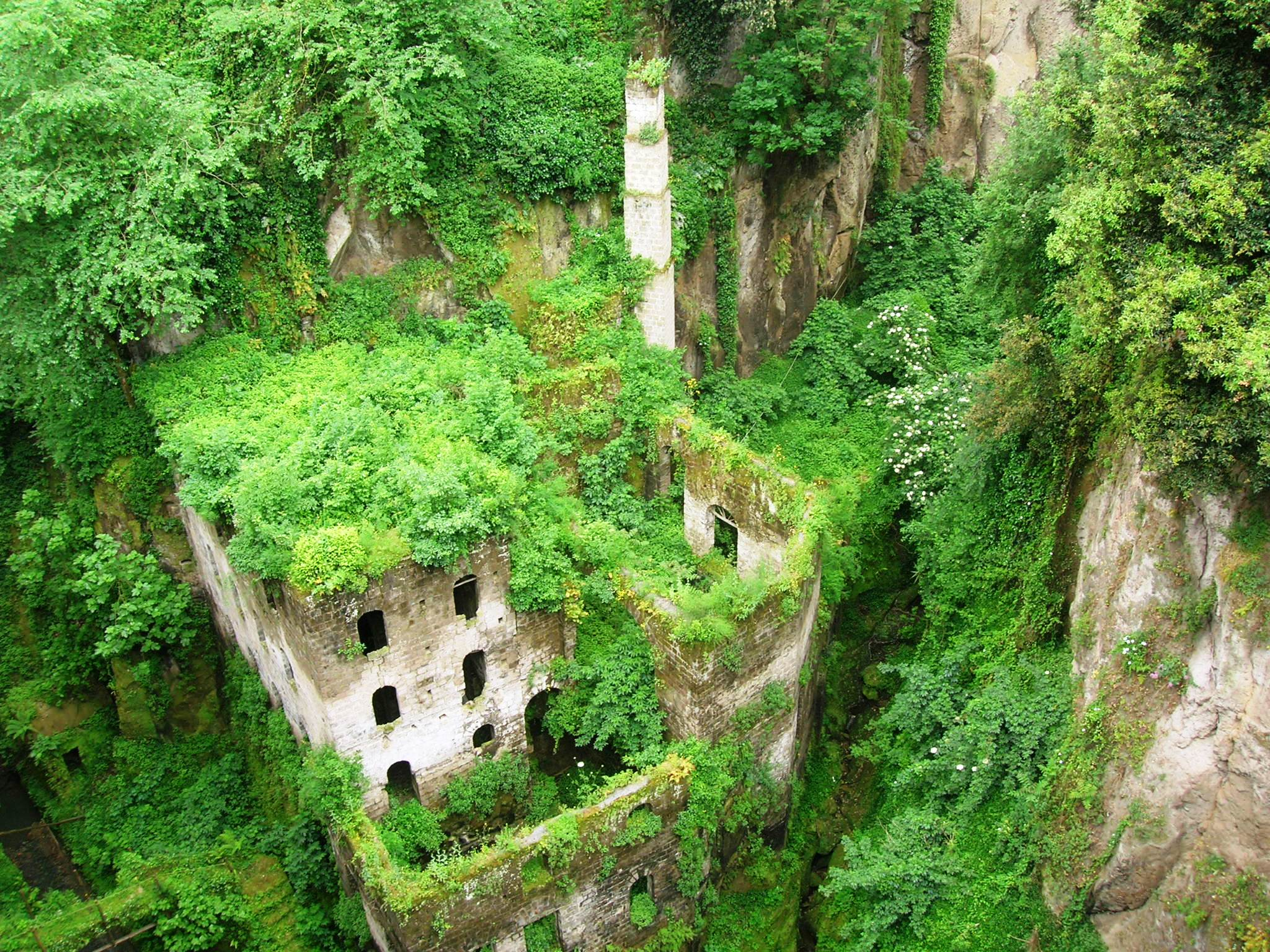
Rewilding in Vallone dei Mulini, Italy

The stone buildings of Vallone dei Mulini in Sorrento, Italy, is thoroughly reclaimed by thick and dense vegetation. The abandoned areas of Bussana Vecchia, Pentedattilo and Civita di Bagnoregio contain structures that are overgrown with grass and weeds. Alianello, which is an abandoned hamlet just south of Aliano, features trees that have grown up in the middle of kitchens. In the abandoned town of Craco, greenery sprouts from decaying bricks of its structures. Aldea da Barca, in Ourense, Spain, which was abandoned in the 1980s, is now overgrown, with vegetation covering much of the roads and building façades. The abandoned village of Turruncún in La Rioja has slowly been reclaimed by nature. The abandoned old town of Belchite in Spain features weeds growing through the cracks and crevices of its structures.

Peneda Geres National Park in Portugal, which was a leading boar territory, before centuries of farming and human influence that made them disappear from the area. In the 20th century, wild boars and even the ibexes, which have been regionally extinct, have made a comeback to the park. The winter villages in the region around Castro Laboreiro in Portugal have mostly been abandoned and forests have reclaimed them. Vilarinho da Furna in Portugal is a village submerged by a dam that only reappears during droughts. The village of Vatheia, Greece, is largely abandoned, with weeds growing inside some of the towers and even within the church.

=== Central and Eastern Europe ===
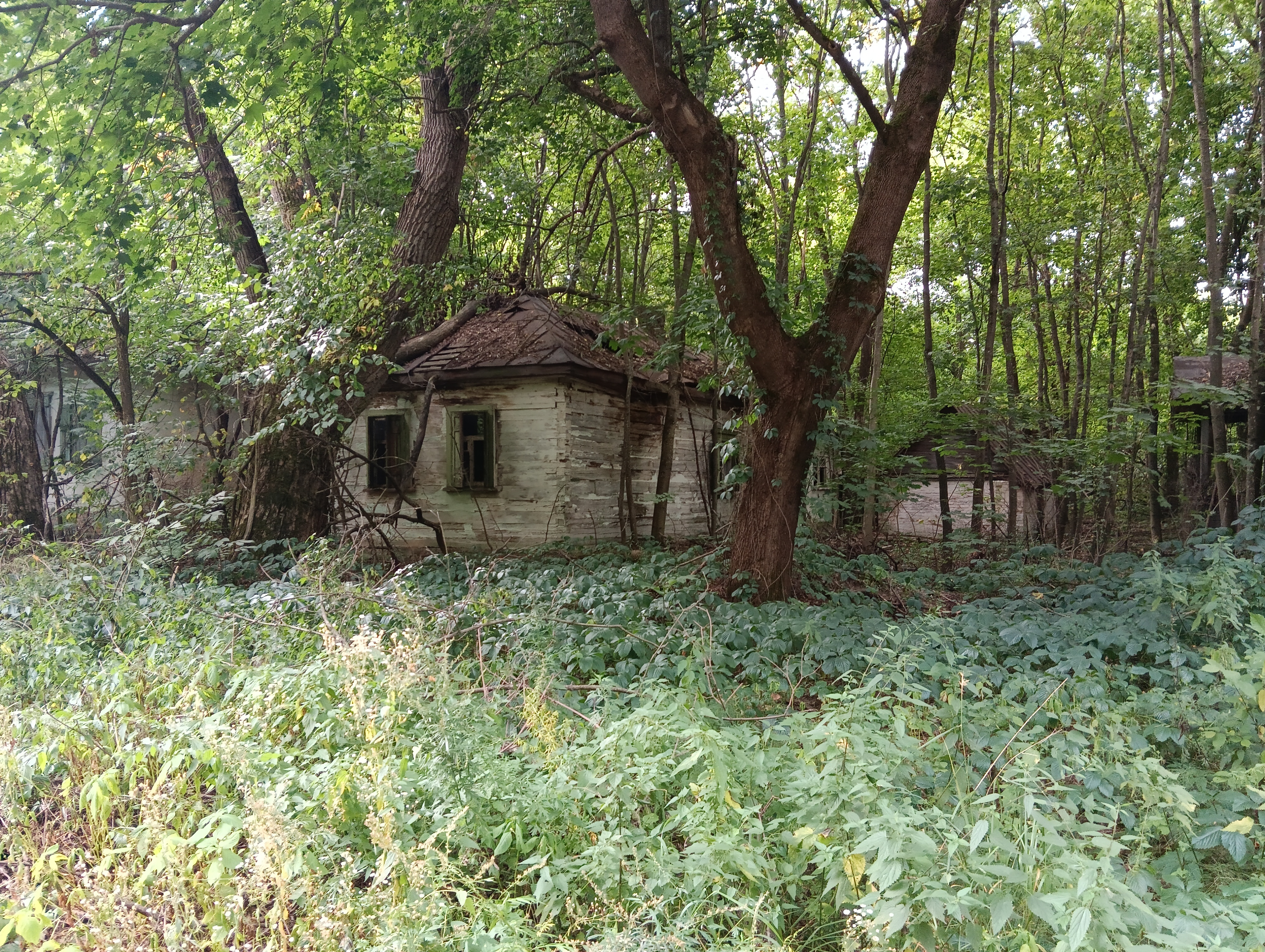
House overgrown by trees in Chernobyl, Ukraine

The Chernobyl Exclusion Zone has seen the return of previously extirpated indigenous species such as boars, lynxes, wolves, brown bears, and 200+ species of bird, in addition to a thriving herd of re-introduced Przewalski's horses, with streets and buildings being surrounded by overgrowth of vegetation. While wildlife flourishes in the least affected areas, tumors, infertility, and lower brain weight are reported in many small animals (including mice and birds) living in areas subject to severe contamination. The Red Forest in Polesia is now home to a wide variety of wildlife, which have thrived in the area due to the lack of human activity. Passive rewilding has occurred in the areas of Bosnia-Herzegovina affected by land mines, minefields in Croatia, and minefields in Kosovo, due to unexploded ordnance.

The stringent military control of the Iron Curtain left a large corridor across Europe. Parts have never been cleared of landmines, resulting in said areas being closed off to the public, allowing passive rewilding to materialize and natural biotopes to form, such as in places like the German Green Belt, or the Green Ribbon, which extends from the Baltic Sea to the Franconian Forest, spanning roughly 1,400 kilometers (though it is only 20–100 meters wide in most places). Covering just under 200 square kilometers, about half of the wildlife and plant species within the Belt are classified as threatened or endangered. Some parts of the so-called "Green Ribbon" allowed wolves, bears, lynx, eagles and other wildlife to re-establish themselves. An initiative is underway to protect this wilderness as a European Green Belt. The Zone Rouge, former First World War battlefield located at northeastern France, has created unique habitats for wildlife. Nature and vegetation have gradually taken over Villers Abbey in Belgium. Spreepark in Berlin, Germany, is cloaked with lush greenery, with moss covering some of the remaining rides.

=== Americas ===
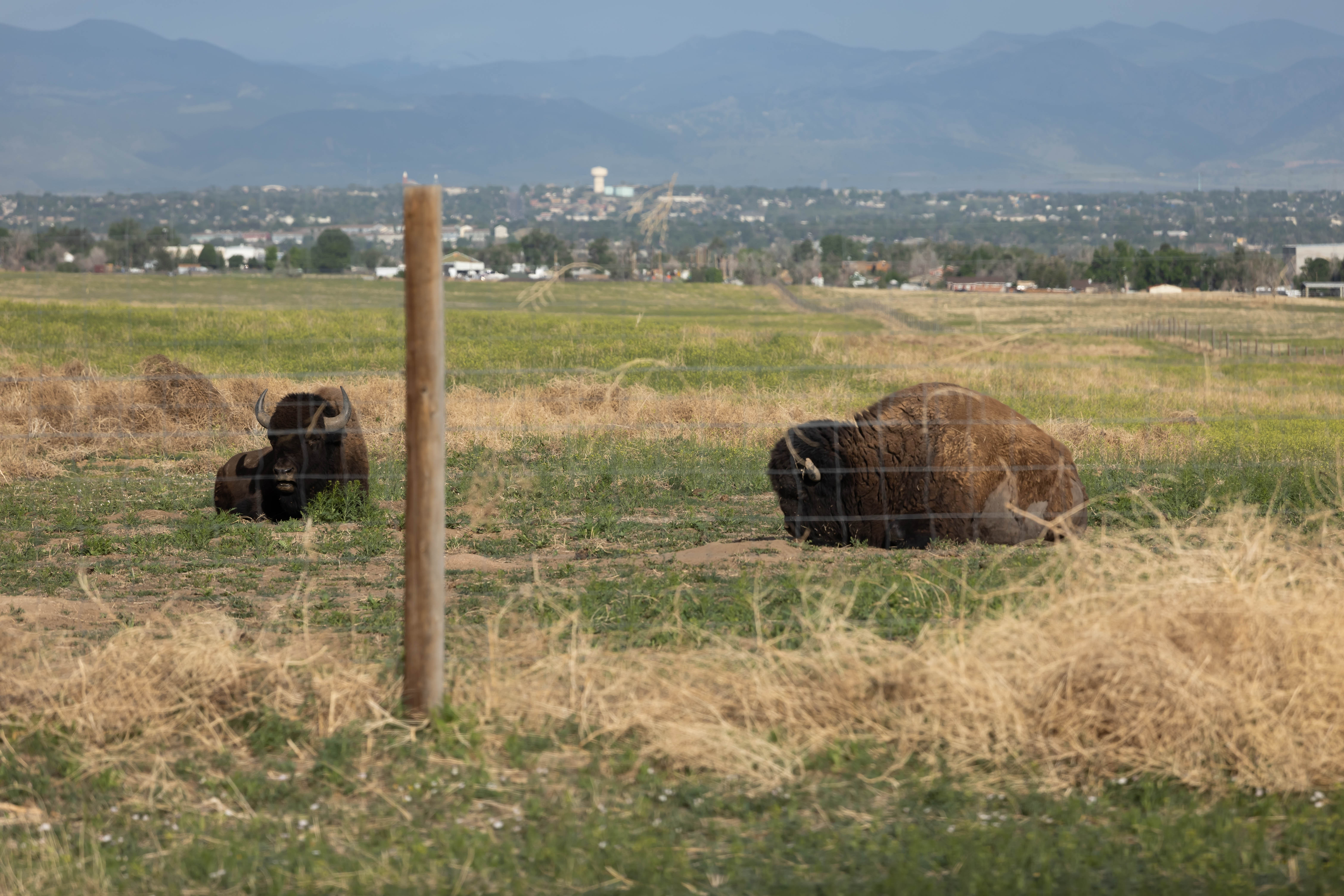
American bison at the Rocky Mountain Arsenal National Wildlife Refuge, the former site of the Rocky Mountain Arsenal abandoned due to chemical weapons contamination.

The abandoned buildings in Año Nuevo Island in Northern California are the breeding grounds for northern elephant seal, the endangered Steller's sea lion and thousands of seabirds. The Catskill Mountain House in Overlook Mountain, New York, is a modern ruin that has been reclaimed by nature. Times Beach, Missouri, a town evacuated and dismantled due to dioxin contamination, is now the site of Route 66 State Park. Ha Ha Tonka State Park in Missouri and Chippewa Lake Park in Ohio are involuntary parks featuring, respectively, an incomplete castle and a Ferris wheel that have been overtaken by greenery. Areas of the Allegany Indian Reservation (particularly portions of former New York State Route 17) have been closed off and left to nature. The former Rocky Mountain Arsenal in Denver was abandoned for years due to contamination from production of chemical weapons, yet the wildlife returned and the site was eventually turned into a wildlife refuge. Similarly, the Rocky Flats Plant manufacturing nuclear weapons near Denver was also converted to a wildlife refuge following a Superfund cleanup of nuclear waste.

In Puerto Rico, American colonists, smallholder farmers and herders abandoned the sugar and coffee plantations in the region, and subsequently the trees reclaimed the fields and pastures, with forest cover returning to half (when it was just 9% after plantation). Plymouth, Montserrat in the Lesser Antilles is a ghost town that features shrubs, ferns and other form of vegetation creeping over buildings destroyed by a volcanic eruption. Passive rewilding has occurred at a church ruin in Nuevo San Juan Parangaricutiro, Mexico, with solidified lava encircling it. Calakmul, in the Mexican state of Campeche, is former Mayan city that is now invaded by the surrounding rainforest, and the causeways that cross the swampy land tend to support denser vegetation than the surrounding forest.

Ilha da Queimada Grande in Brazil was inhabited by several lighthouse watchmen, who abandoned it since the 1920s, and is now home to the highly venomous golden lancehead, bats, lizards, the southern house wren and bananaquit. The Buenos Aires Ecological Reserve in the city of Buenos Aires, Argentina, which was formed by a landfill of waste material, now has sand and sediment built up and it is developed into a biodiversity sample of the native Llanura Pampeana ecosystem.

== Gallery ==
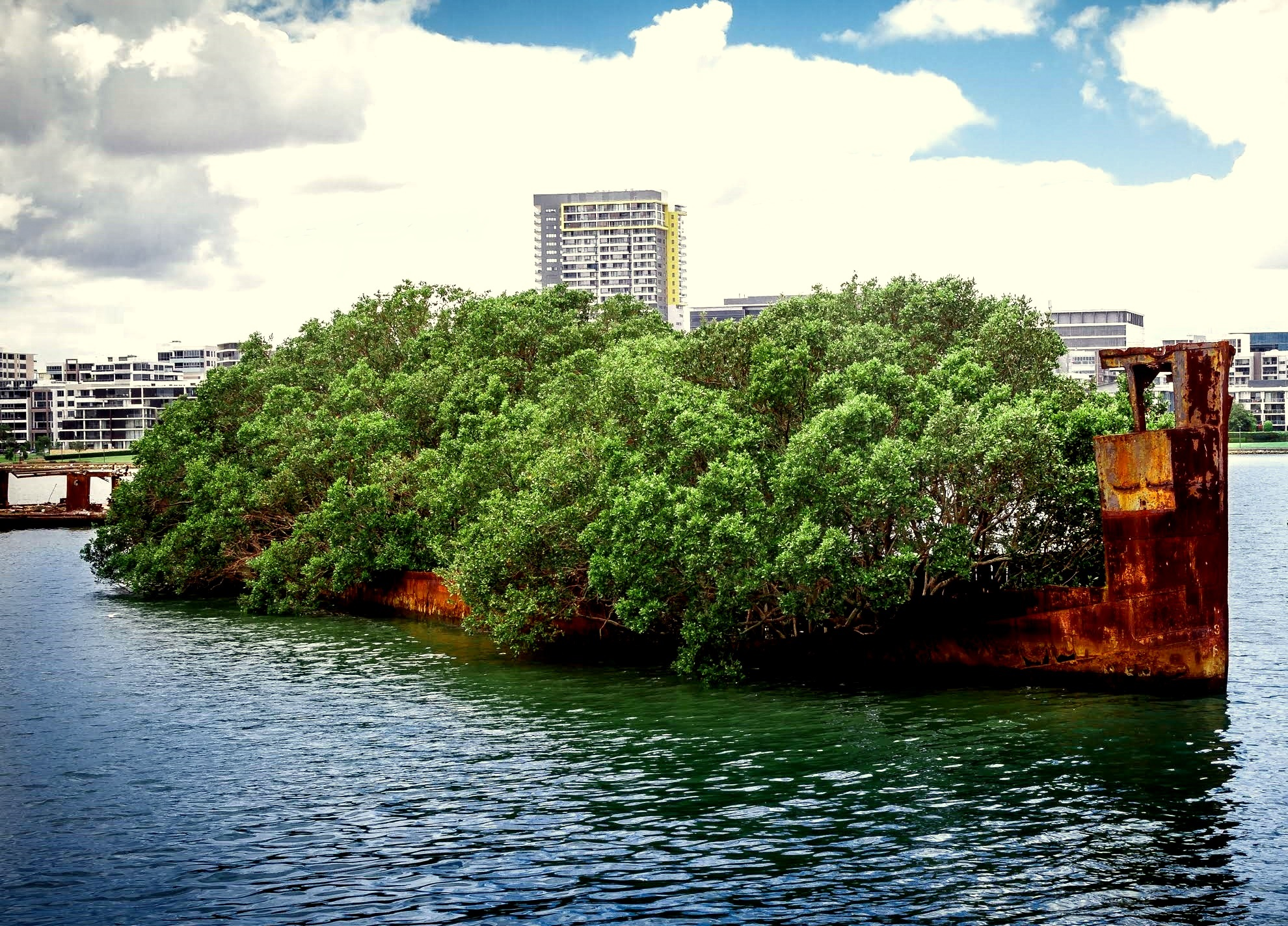
Dense mangroves engulfing the wreck of SS Ayrfield in Sydney, Australia

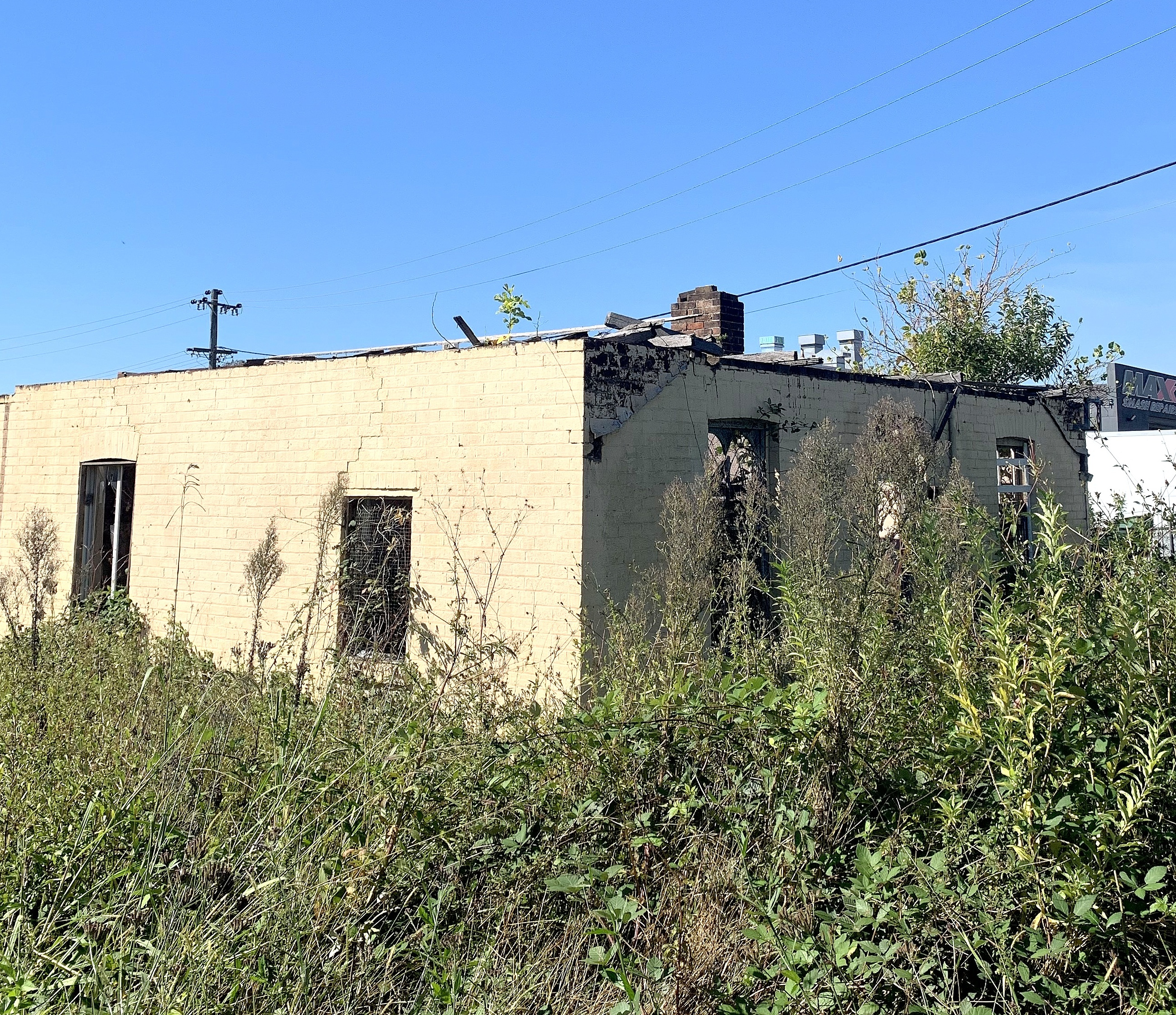
A dilapidated home overgrown by vegetation in Western Sydney, Australia

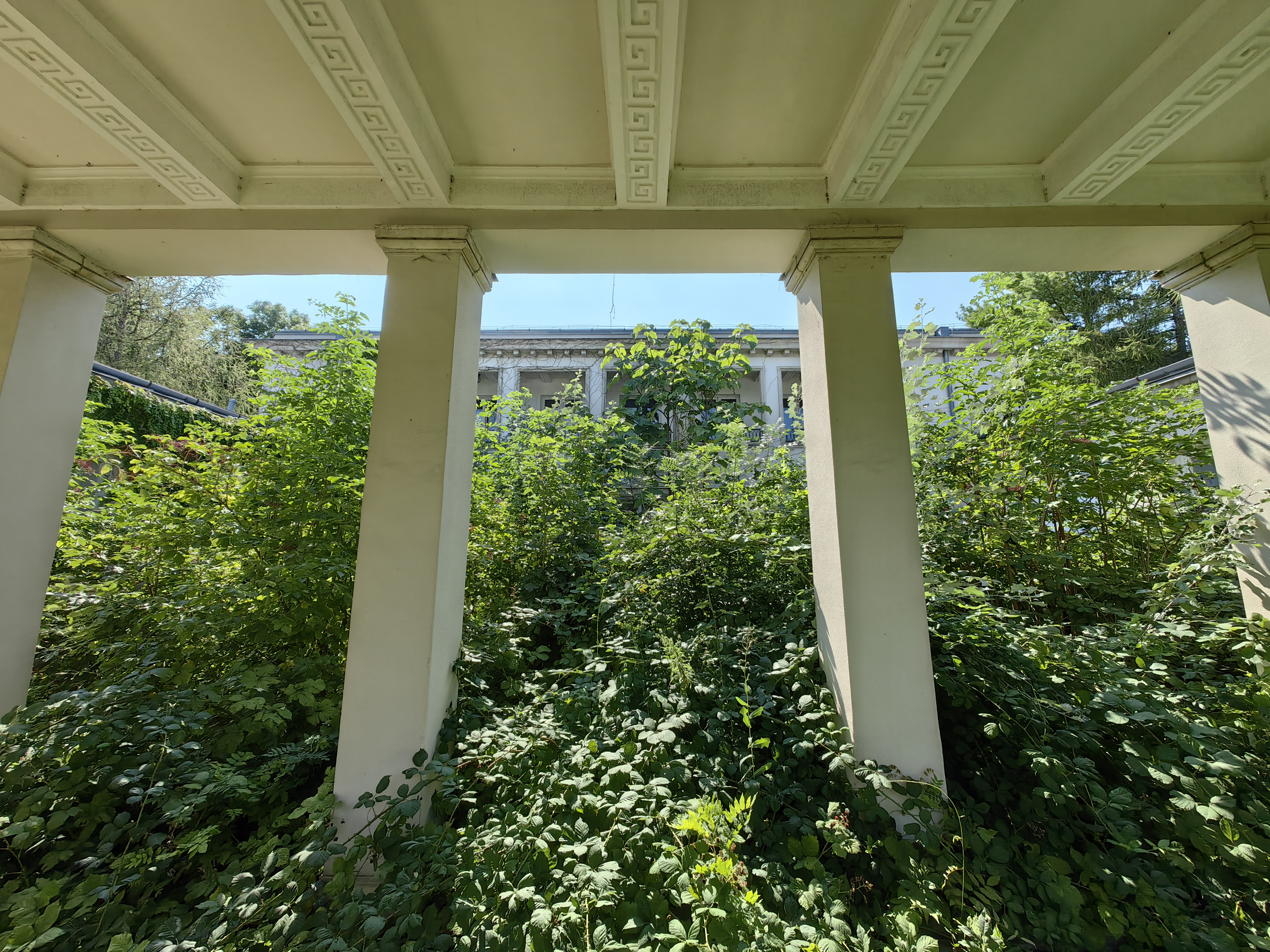
Abandoned building in Budapest, Hungary

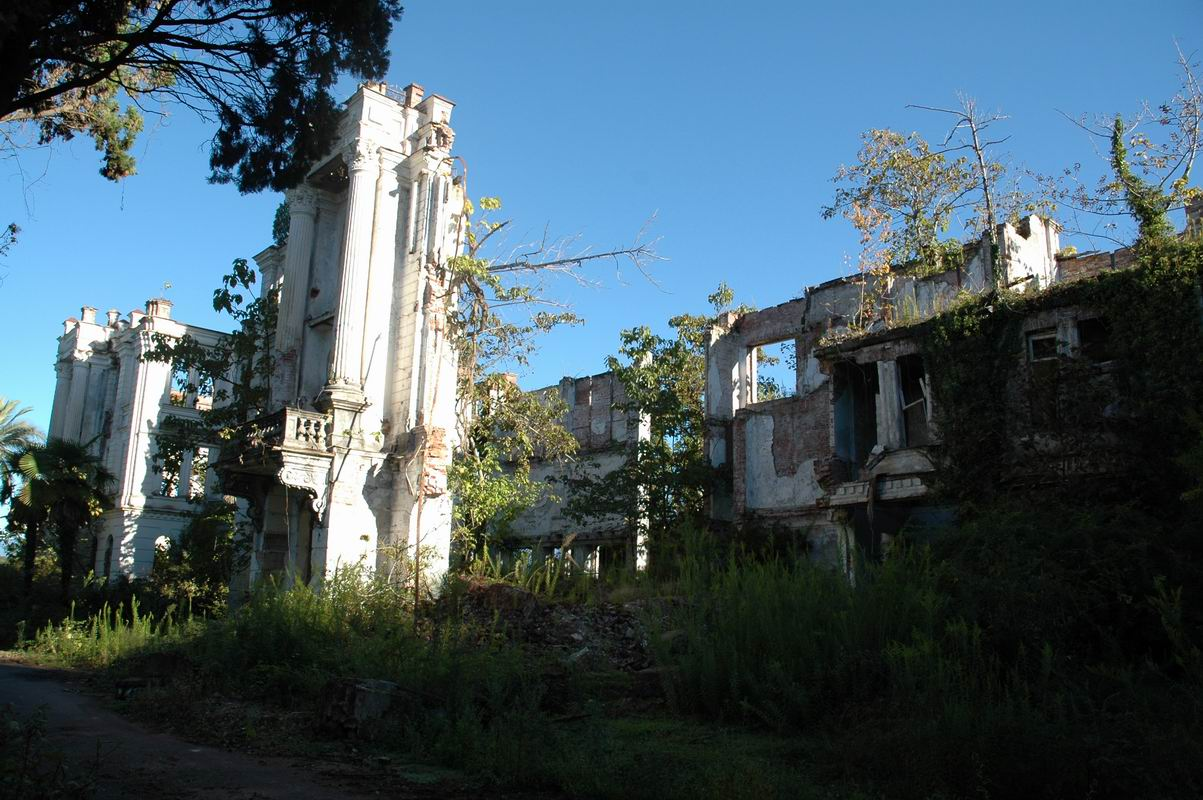
Classical-style building in Abkhasia with vegetation overgrowing the crumbling walls and broken columns

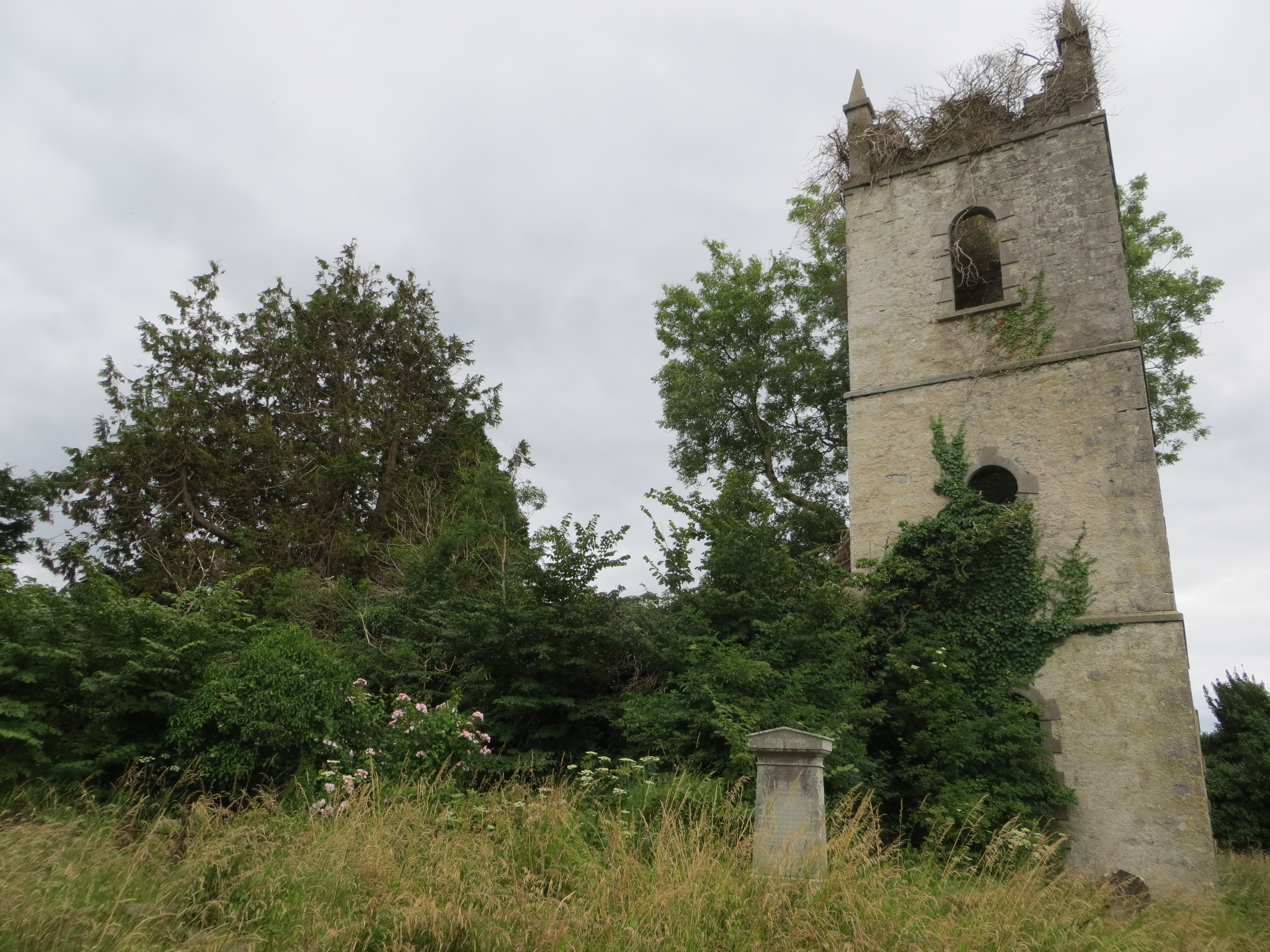
6th Century church founded by Saint Colmcille in Ballymote, Ireland

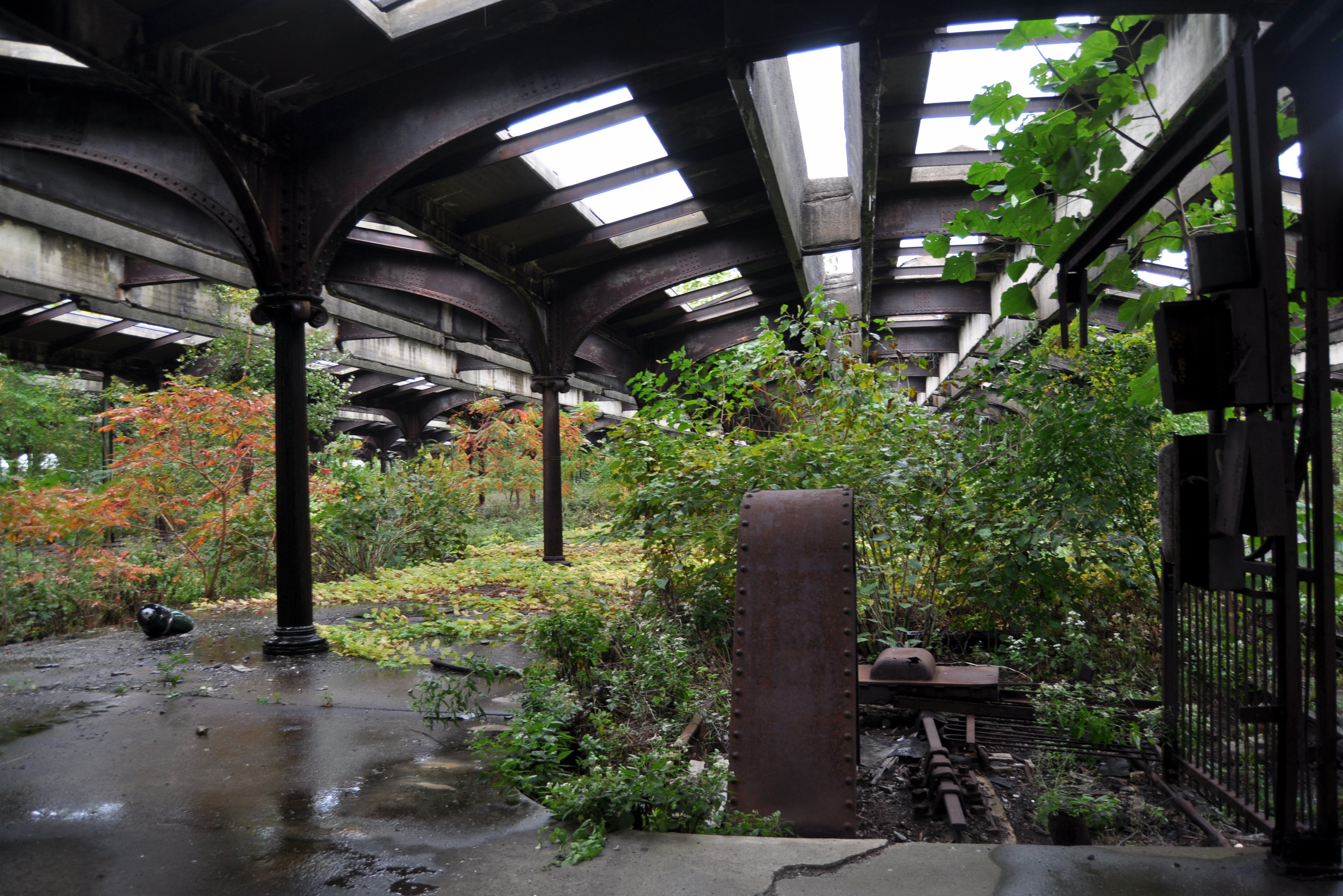
Abandoned railroad platforms of the Central Railroad of New Jersey Terminal, United States

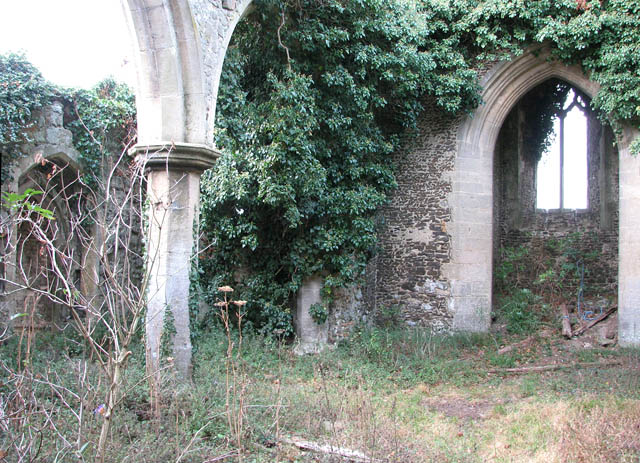
The ruined church of Saint Felix, clad in vines of ivy, Babingley, United Kingdom

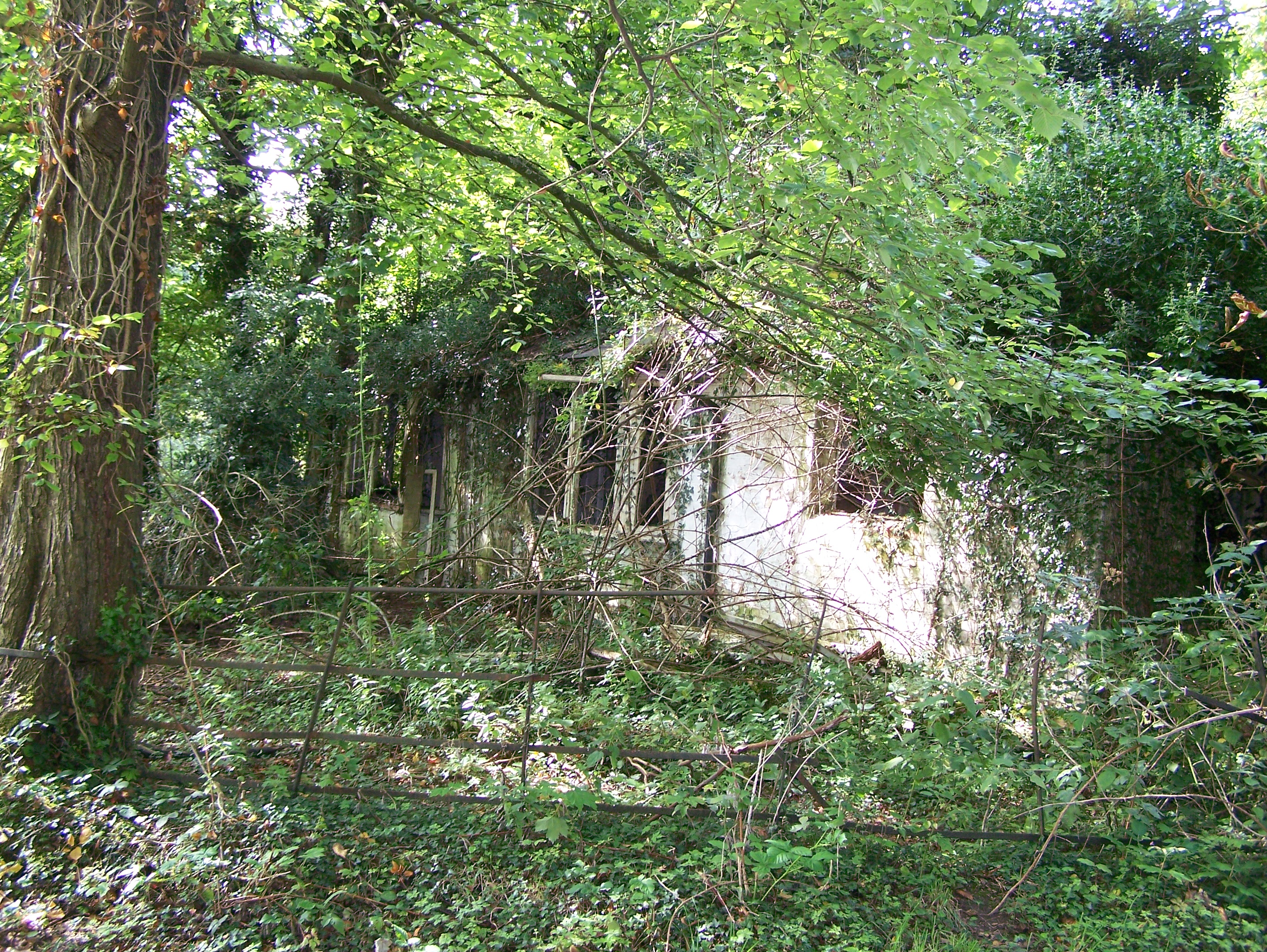
Abandoned bungalow overgrown, Iver, England

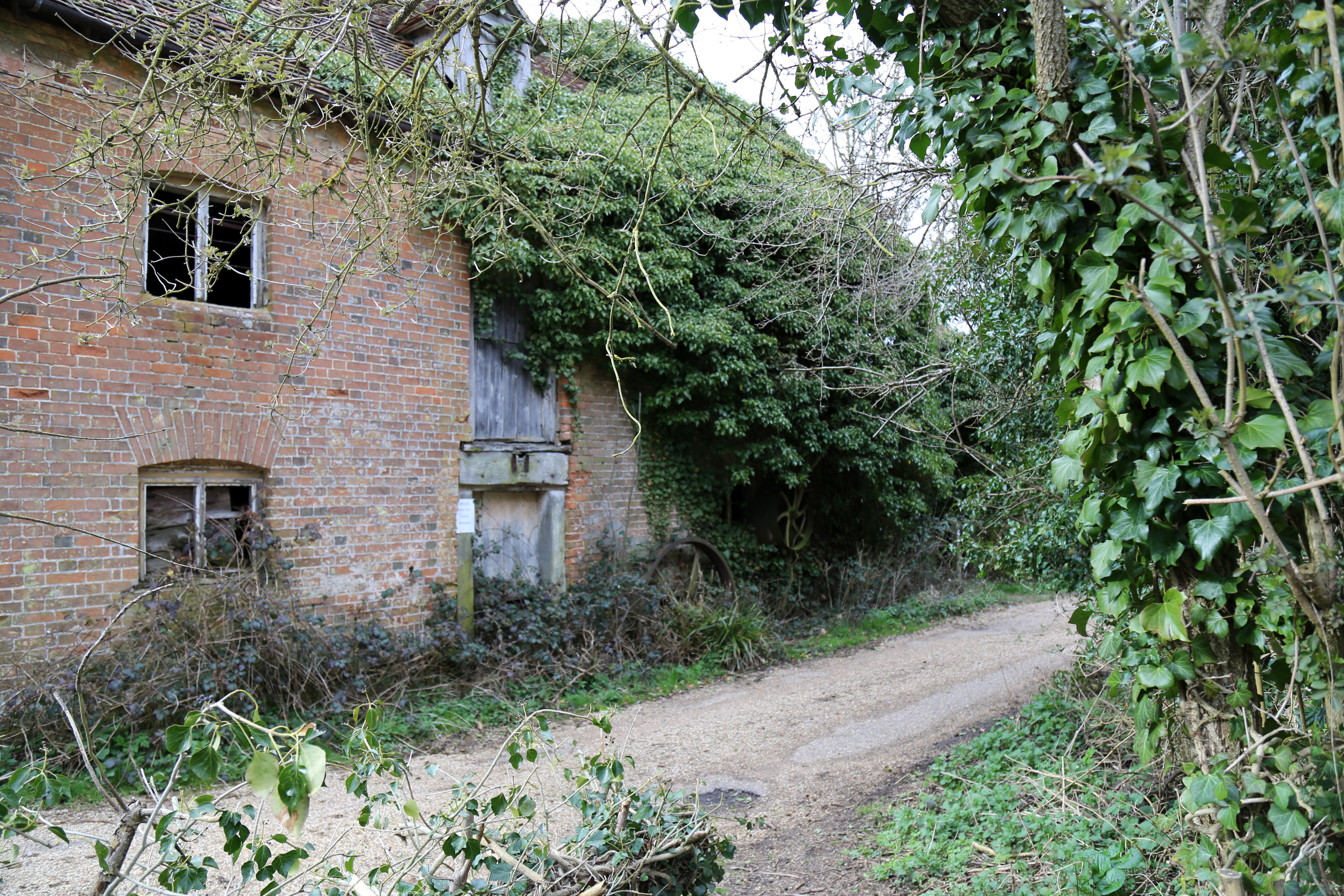
Abandoned mill overgrown with vegetation at Tilty, Essex, England

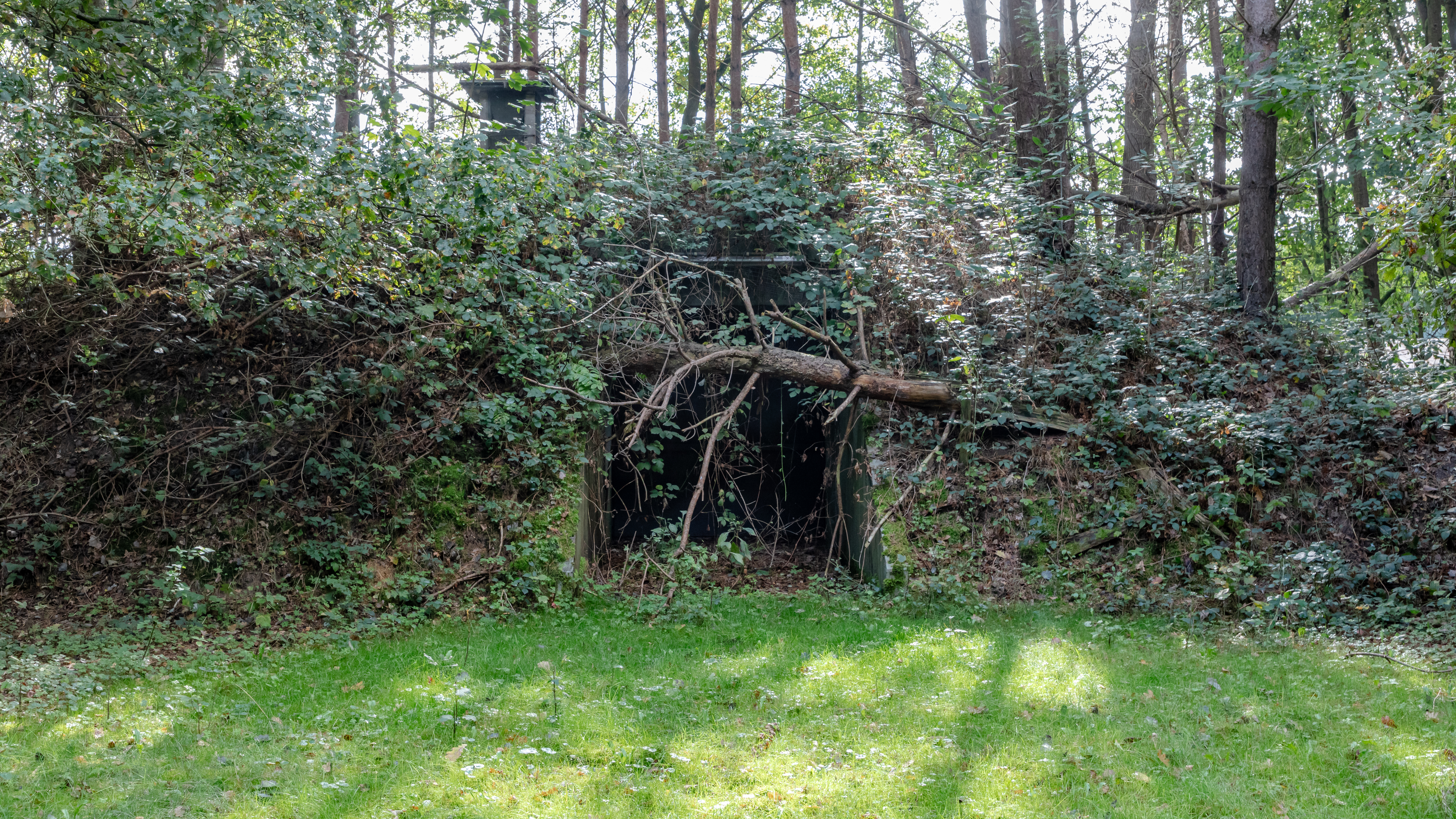
Ammunition depot overgrown with weeds, Dülmen, North Rhine-Westphalia, Germany

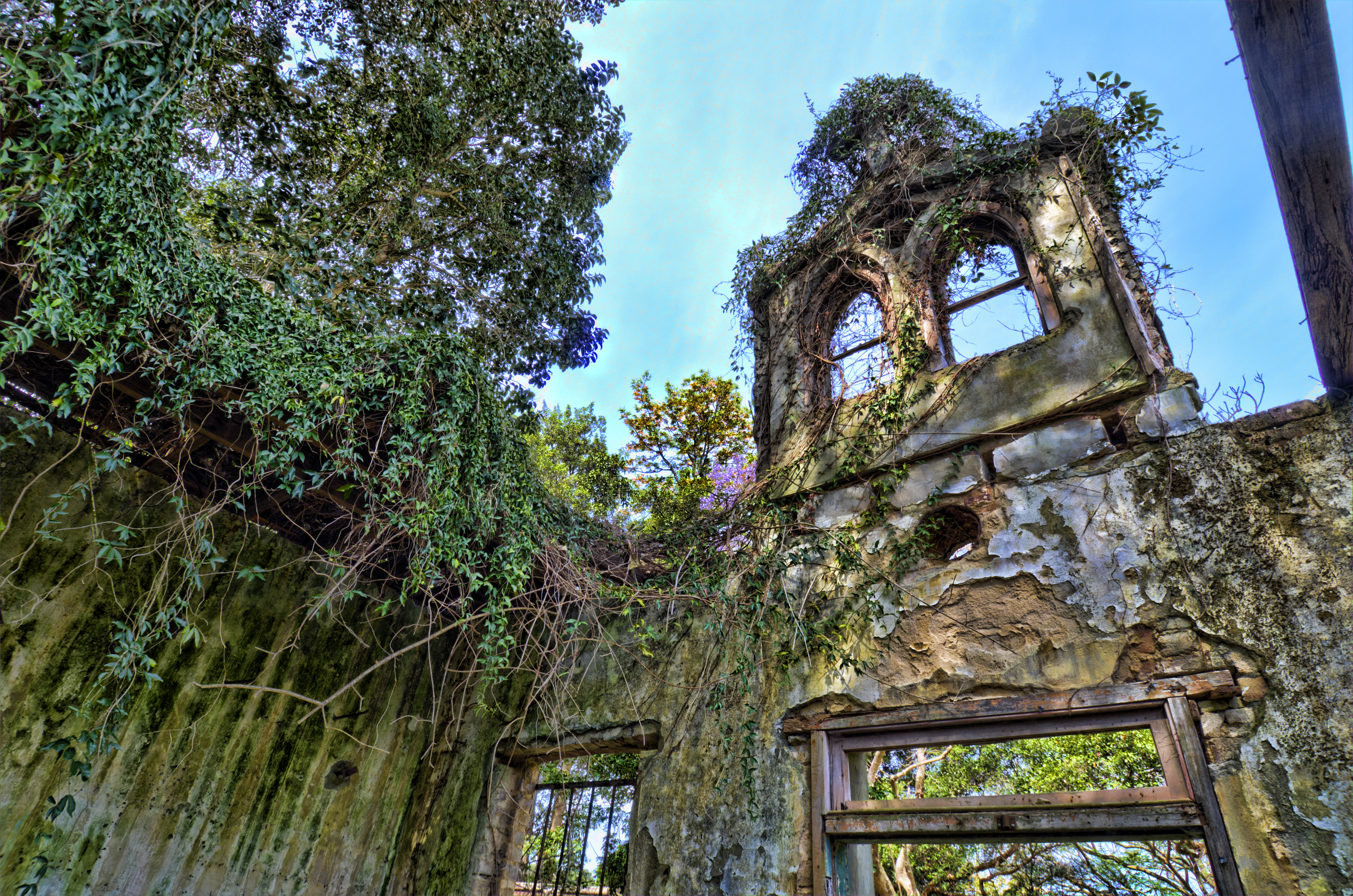
A garden folly at Gladesville Mental Hospital, Sydney, reclaimed by nature

== See also ==
- Urban decay – Sociological process affecting cities
- Ruins photography – Sub-genre of photography
- Rewilding – Restoring of wilderness environments
- Ecological succession – Change of species in a region over time
- Urban prairie – Vacant urban land reverted to green space
- Urban reforestation – Planting of trees in urban environments
- Land restoration – Process of restoring land to a different state
