= Urban prairie =

Vacant urban land reverted to green space

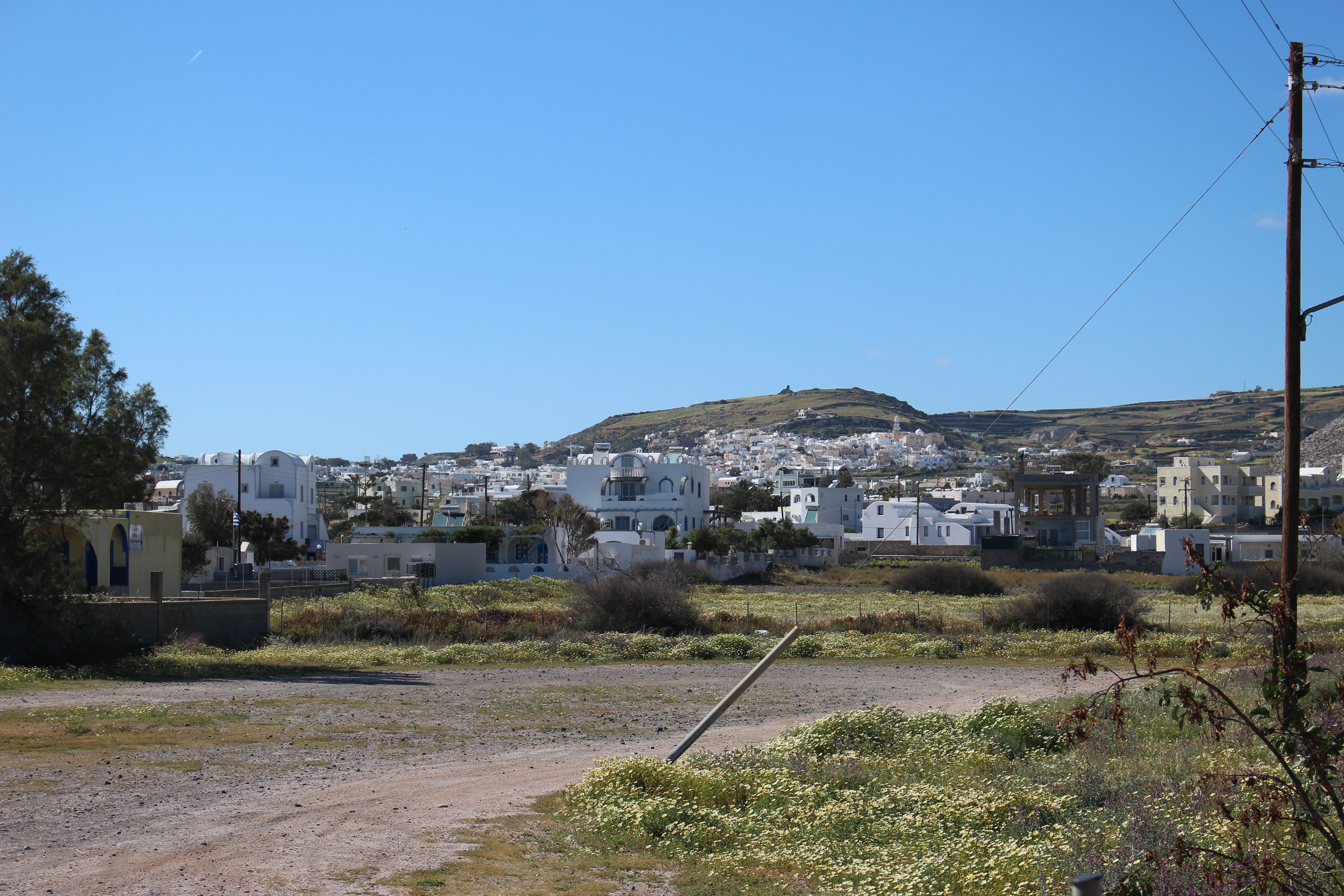
An urban prairie outside of Santorini, Greece.

Urban prairie (or urban grassland) is vacant urban land that has reverted to green space. The definition can vary across countries and disciplines, but at its broadest encompasses meadows, lawns, and gardens, as well as public and private parks, vacant land, remnants of rural landscapes, and areas along transportation corridors. If previously developed, structures occupying the urban lots have been demolished, leaving patchy areas of green space that are usually untended and unmanaged, forming an involuntary park. Spaces can also be intentionally created to facilitate amenities, such as green belts, community gardens and wildlife reserve habitats.

Urban brownfields are contaminated grasslands that also fall under the urban grassland umbrella. Urban greenspaces are a larger category that include urban grasslands in addition to other spaces.

== Causes ==
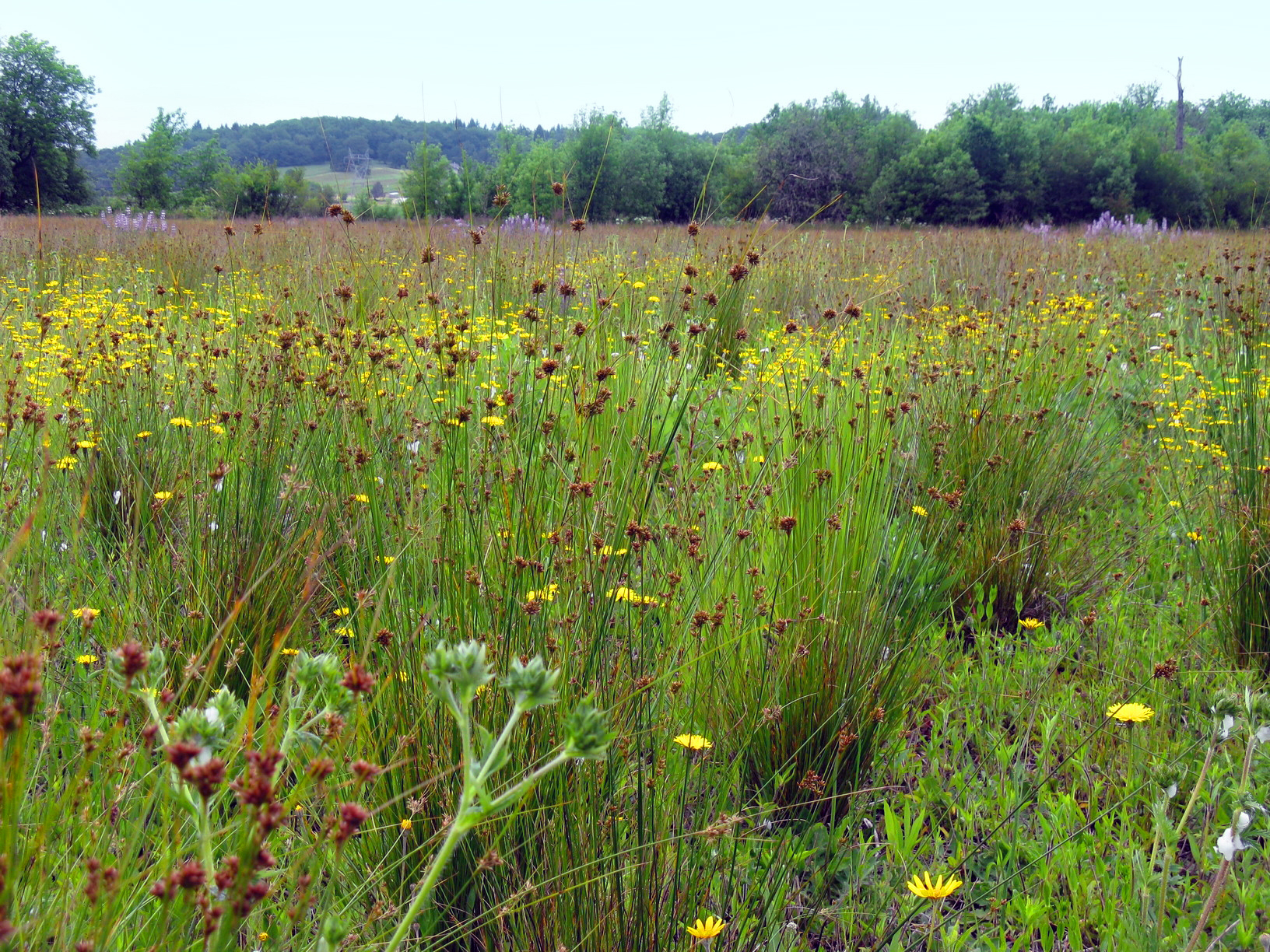
A restored prairie near Eugene, Oregon.

Urban prairies can result from several factors. They can either be land that was previously developed and has since been cleared, or remnants of the natural landscape. In the first case, the value of aging buildings may fall too low to provide financial incentives for their owners to maintain them or seizure by local government as a response to unpaid property taxes. In many cases, cities demolish vacant structures because they pose health and safety threats (such as fire hazards), or may be used as a location for criminal activity.

Areas may be cleared of buildings as part of a revitalization plan with the intention of redeveloping the land. In flood-prone areas, government agencies may purchase developed lots and then demolish the structures to improve drainage during floods. Neighborhoods near major industrial or environmental clean-up sites can be acquired and leveled to create a buffer zone and minimize the risks associated with pollution or industrial accidents. Additionally, residents of the city may fill up the unplanned empty space with urban parks or community gardens. Governments and non-profit groups can also create community gardens and conservation, to restore or reintroduce wildlife habitat, help the environment, and educate people about the prairie. Detroit, Michigan, is one particular city which has many urban prairies.

== Benefits ==
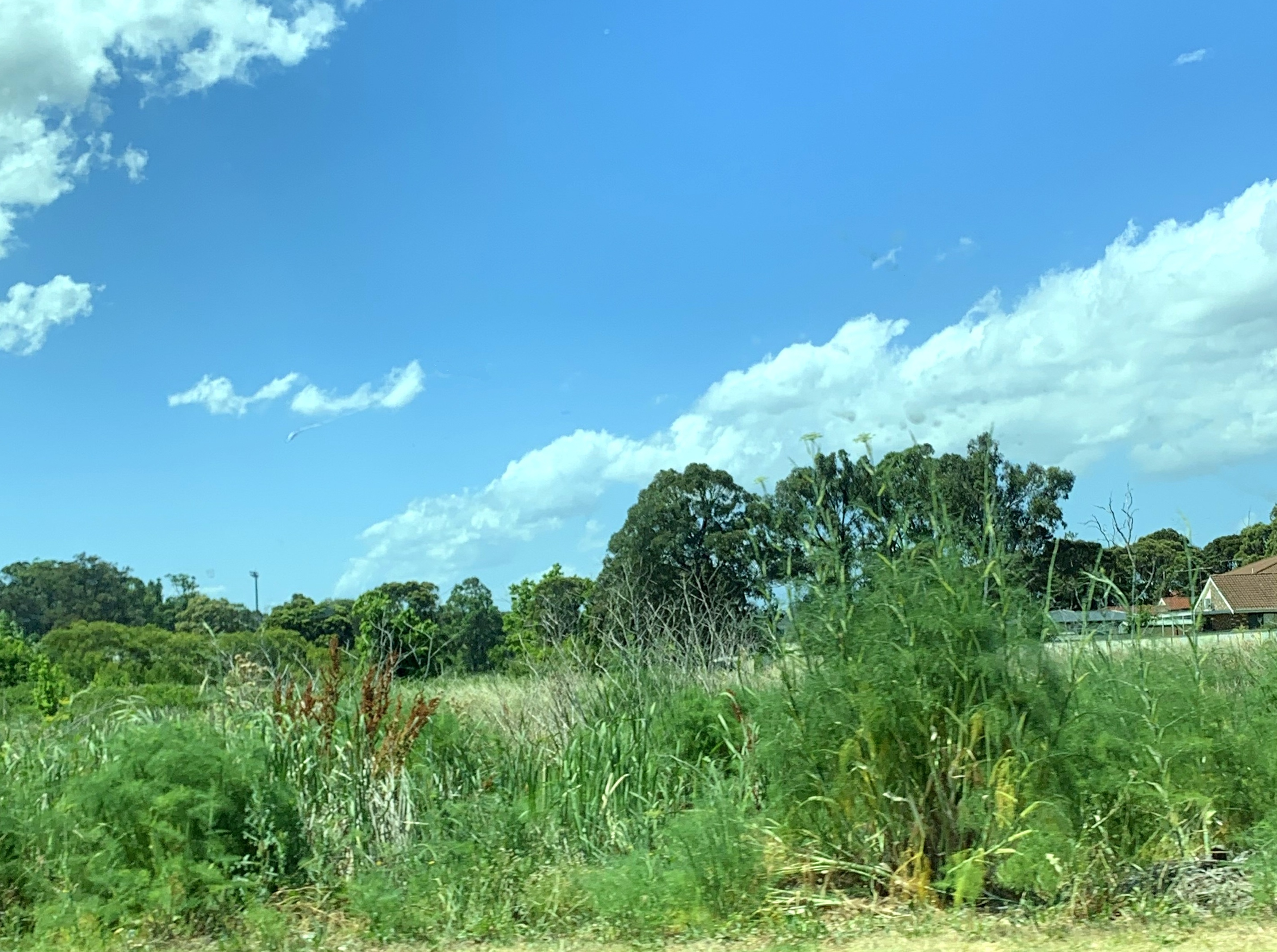
An urban prairie in Western Sydney, Australia

Many studies show urbanization has been linked to a loss of biodiversity. Additionally, remaining urban landscapes are typically unable to support the complex food webs they previously hosted and become novel habitats home to highly adapted alien species, such as rats, cockroaches, and pigeons. As natural landscapes are replaced with urban ones, the ecosystem services of the area can be diminished. Due to this, in urban areas green spaces and grasslands are even more vital. These areas not only better human life through providing space for leisure activities, and social interaction, but also direct health benefits such as reducing air pollution.

They also provide homes for important pollinators such as wild bees. Despite the issues surrounding their cleanup and maintenance, even small urban grasslands can have a big effect ecologically. In Melbourne, Australia at the Tunnerminnerwait and Maulboyheenner memorial site just three years after being replanted with a variety of native species and receiving upkeep, the green space had increased the number and diversity of insects in the vicinity.

== See also ==
- Urban decay
- Passive rewilding
