= Modern ruins =

Ruins of architecture constructed in the recent past

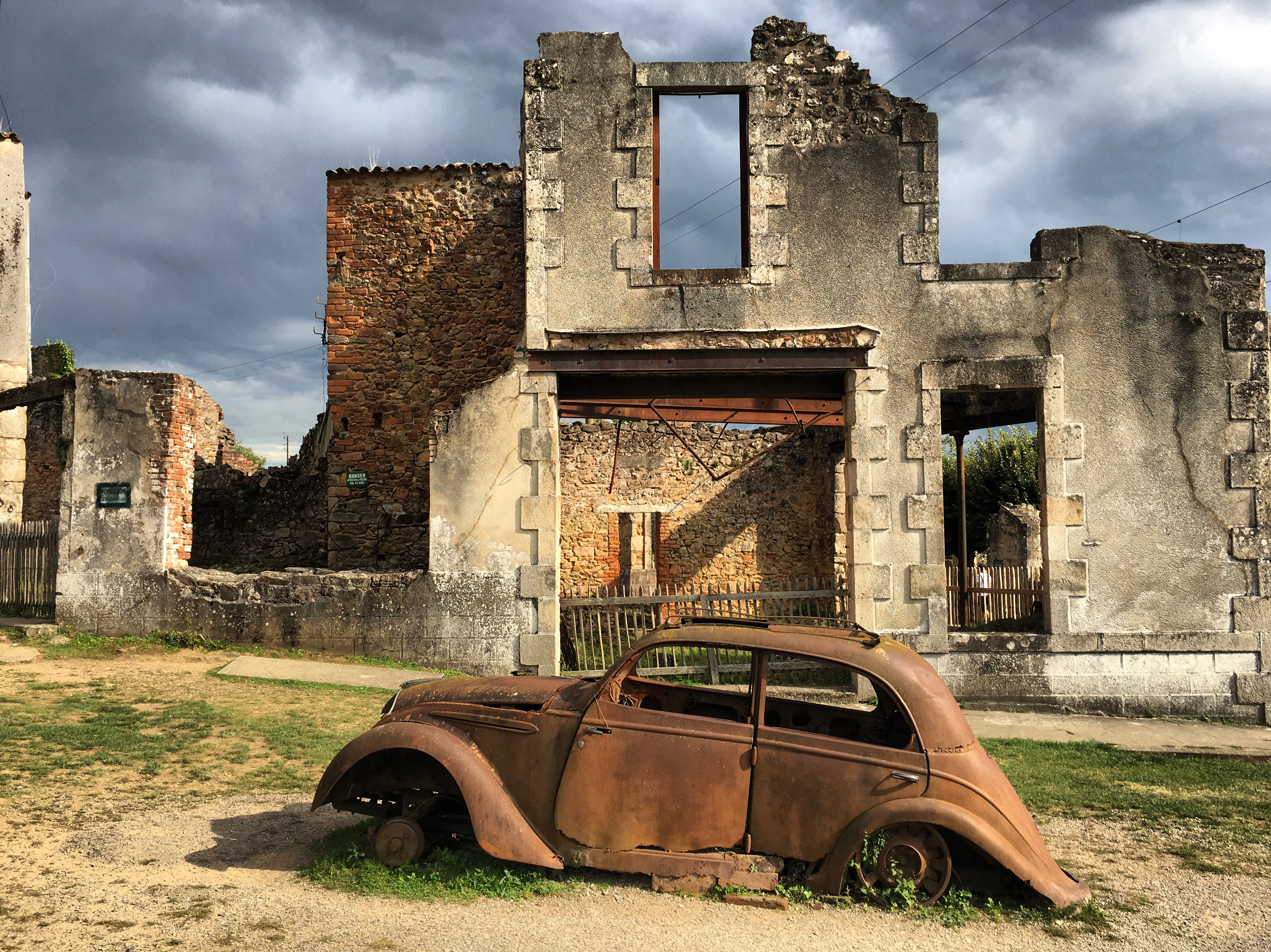
Oradour-sur-Glane in France, which was destroyed by the military forces of Nazi Germany in the 1940s

Modern ruins are the remains of architecture constructed in the recent past, generally in the most recent century, or since the 19th century. The term is most frequently used by people performing urban exploration of man-made architecture that is abandoned or no longer accessible to the general public, such as structures abandoned through the process of urban decay. Enough documentation on these sites may have been lost over time that this unscientific exploration resembles archaeology of ancient ruins in the methods used to collect information.

High-profile modern ruins include amusement parks, grain elevators, factories, power plants, missile silos, fallout shelters, hospitals, asylums, prisons, schools, poor houses, malls and sanatoriums.

== Popularity ==
Many sightseers find decay of uninhabited space to be profoundly beautiful, and some are also skilled freelance photographers who document what they see, as is the case with those who document some of the infrastructure of the former USSR. Ventures into abandoned structures are perhaps the most common example of urban exploration. At times, sites are entered first by locals and may suffer from large amounts of graffiti and other acts of vandalism, while other locations may be better preserved.

In Japan, abandoned infrastructure is known as haikyo (廃墟) (literally "ruins"), but the term is synonymous with the practice of urban exploration. Haikyo are particularly common in Japan because of its rapid industrialization (e.g., Hashima Island), damage during World War II, the 1980s real estate bubble, and the 2011 Tōhoku earthquake and tsunami.

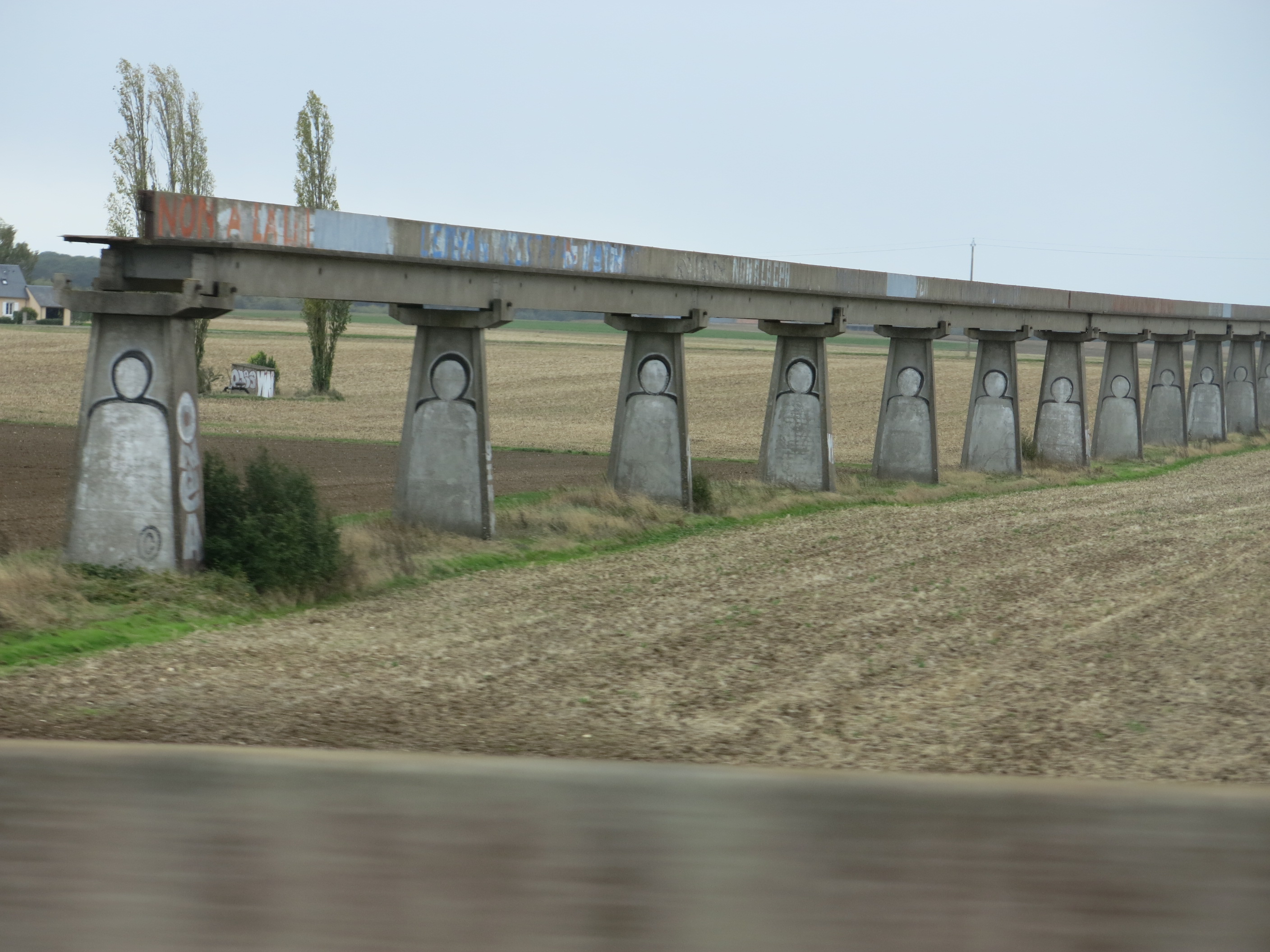
Abandoned test track for Aérotrain

Some modern ruins are the remains of sites which were important for history of engineering. Some examples are:

- Peenemünde (development of large rockets propelled with liquid fuel)
- Aérotrain test tracks in France (development of a hovertrain system)
- RCN Konstantynow (site of tallest man-made structure from 1974 to 1991)

== Archaeology ==
The archaeological study of modern ruins is most commonly associated with contemporary, urban, and industrial archaeology. The processes and goals involved in the archaeological study of modern ruins are very similar to those of other branches of archaeology that primarily focus on studying sites of earlier time periods. Particular field methods used include meticulous surveying, excavation, and record keeping, all of which are generally similar to archaeology concerning older, buried sites. However, it has been argued that the archaeological approach to modern ruins should be more embodied and visually well rounded, rather than simply communicating information by conventional site descriptions and reports. Photography, for example, is often used as a medium to communicate discoveries made in modern ruins as well as in contemporary archaeological sites in general since most of the artifacts are found above ground level.

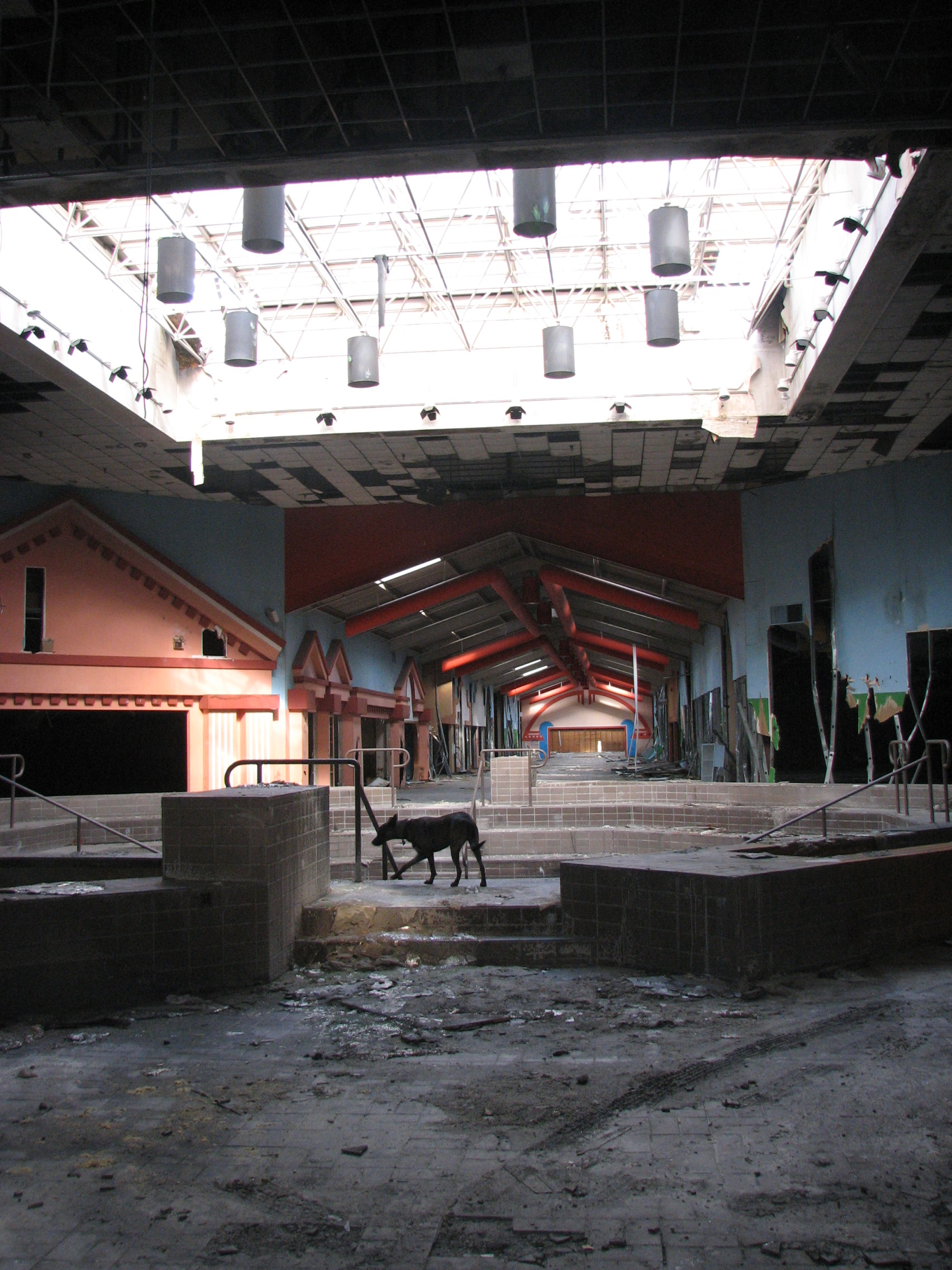
The Belz Enterprises Belz Factory Outlet Mall, an abandoned shopping mall in Allen, Texas

Modern ruins are often considered to be representative of an accelerated rate of change, not only of their material and structural makeup or past purpose but also in many cases of society as a whole. For example, Pyramiden, a former Soviet mining town located in the High Arctic, has frequently been a subject of archaeological study. Having over 1,000 inhabitants during its peak, Pyramiden was abandoned in 1998. Today, devoid of all humans, Pyramiden exists as a Soviet-era ghost town with the buildings and their contents remaining largely as they did when the town was inhabited. Elin Andreassen, Hein B. Bjerck, and Bjørnar Olsen, archaeologists who have studied Pyramiden, have written, "as a site of remembrance-or rather unforgetting-the memories it holds become inseparable from its materiality and from things' unique ability to bring forth these memories."

Understanding why a particular structure was abandoned or has become no longer accessible to the general public is key to interpreting the archaeological material that is exhibited in modern ruins. Archaeologists who study modern ruins focus on understanding several key questions. For example, archaeologists try to answer how materials found at the site got where they were ultimately discovered. Additionally, archaeologists might ask if the material that was found was originally part of the same assemblage and context, or if later occupants added to what was found.

== See also ==
- Ghost town
- Industrial archaeology
- Passive rewilding
- Ruins photography
- Unfinished building
- Urban decay
- Urban exploration
