= Depleted community =

A depleted community is a place that lacks economic growth mechanisms, but to which people maintain social valuations and place attachment. These are typically areas where the strength of capitalistic relationships has diminished within a developed economy. These locations are products of uneven development, which some consider an inherent feature of capitalism. While some areas experience economic growth, depleted communities experience economic stagnation or decline and a host of associated social problems. According to experts in the field of community economic development, depleted communities can be seen as areas that have lost much of their economic rationale as space, while retaining high attachments and social relations of place.

== See also ==
- Capacity building
- Industrialization
- Overproduction
- Urban decay
- Development economics
- Poverty
- Uneven and combined development
