= Urban decay =

Sociological process affecting cities

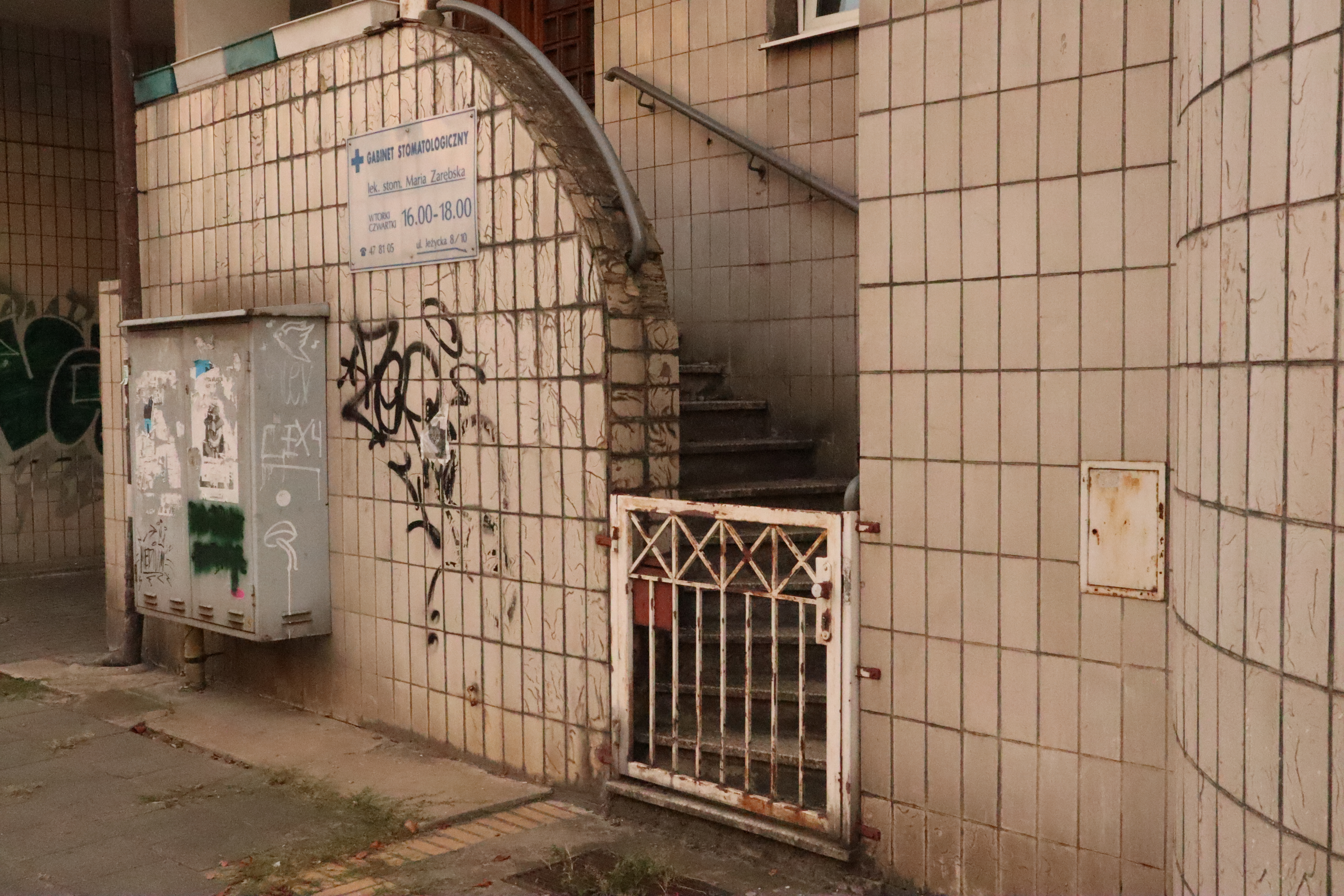
Urban decay in Poznań, Poland. The tiles are cracked and covered in graffiti.

Urban decay (also known as urban rot, urban death or urban blight) is the sociological process by which a previously functioning city, or part of a city, falls into disrepair and decrepitude. There is no single process that leads to urban decay.

== Aspects and causes ==
Urban decay comprises various phenomena, which can include:

- Industrialization
- Deindustrialization
- Population decline (underutilization of services) or overpopulation (placing excessive strain on services and infrastructure)
- Counterurbanization
- Private divestment
- Economic restructuring
- Declining property values
- Abandoned buildings or infrastructure
- High local unemployment
- Increased poverty
- Loss of social cohesion
- Family fragmentation
- Brain drain
- Loss of social capital
- Low overall living standards or quality of life
- Political disenfranchisement
- Crime (e.g., gang activity, corruption, and drug-related crime)
- Large and/or less regulated populations of urban wildlife (e.g., abandoned pets, vermin, pests, feral animals, and semi-feral animals)
- Elevated levels of pollution (e.g., air pollution, noise pollution, water pollution, and light pollution)
- Desolate cityscape known as greyfield land or urban prairie

Since the 1970s and 1980s, urban decay has been a phenomenon associated with some Western cities, metropolitan areas, and megalopolis's, especially in North America and parts of Europe. Cities have experienced population flights to the suburbs, exurbs, commuter towns, villages, hamlets, rural areas and outposts; often in the form of white flight. Another characteristic of urban decay is blight – the visual, psychological, and physical effects of living among empty lots, buildings, and condemned houses.

Urban decay is often the result of interrelated socioeconomic issues, including urban planning decisions, economic deprivation of the local populace, the construction of freeways and railroad lines that bypass or run through the area, depopulation by suburbanization of peripheral lands, real estate neighborhood redlining, and immigration restrictions.

== History ==
During the Industrial Revolution, many people moved from rural areas to cities for employment in the manufacturing industry, thus causing urban populations to boom. Subsequent economic change left many cities economically vulnerable. Studies such as the Urban Task Force (DETR 1999), the Urban White Paper (DETR 2000), and a study of Scottish cities (2003) hypothesize areas suffering from industrial decline, high unemployment, poverty, and a decaying physical environment (sometimes including contaminated land and obsolete infrastructure) – prove "highly resistant to improvement".

Changes in transportation from public to private (specifically, to the private motor car) eliminated some of the public transport service advantages associated with cities, e.g., fixed-route buses and trains. In particular, at the end of World War II, many political decisions favored suburban development and encouraged suburbanization through financial incentives like government-supported FHA loans and VA mortgage aid. This allowed many veterans of World War II and their families to afford comfortable single-family housing in suburbs.

The manufacturing industry has historically been a base for the prosperity of major cities. When these industries relocate to larger, less urban environments, some cities have experienced population loss with associated urban decay, and even riots. Cutbacks on police and fire services may result, while lobbying for government-funded housing may increase. Increased city taxes encourage residents to move out. Libertarian economists argue that rent control contributes to urban blight by reducing new construction and investment in housing and discouraging maintenance.

== Countries ==
=== France ===
Large French cities are often surrounded by areas of urban decay. While city centers tend to be occupied mainly by upper-class residents, cities are often surrounded by public housing developments, with many tenants being of North African origin (from Morocco, Algeria and Tunisia), and recent immigrants.

From the 1950s to the 1970s, publicly funded housing projects resulted in large areas of mid- to high-rise buildings. These modern "grands ensembles" were welcomed at the time, as they replaced shanty towns and raised living standards, but these areas were heavily affected by economic depression in the 1980s.

The banlieues of large cities like Lyon, especially the northern Parisian banlieues, are criticized by the country's territorial spatial planning administration. They have been ostracized since the Paris Commune government of 1871, considered as "lawless" or "outside the law", even "outside the Republic", as opposed to "deep France" or "authentic France", which is associated with the countryside.

In November 2005, the French suburbs were the scene of riots sparked by the accidental electrocution of two teenagers in the northern suburbs of Paris, and fueled in part by the substandard living conditions in these areas. Many deprived suburbs of French cities were the scenes of clashes between youth and the police, with violence and numerous car burnings resulting in media coverage.

Today, the situation remains generally unchanged; however, there is a level of disparity. Some areas are experiencing increased drug trafficking, while some northern suburbs of Paris and areas like Vaulx-en-Velin are undergoing refurbishment and redevelopment.

Some previously mono-industrial towns in France are experiencing increasing crime, decay, and decreasing population. The issue remains a divisive issue in French public politics.

=== Germany ===
Many east German towns such as Hoyerswerda face or are facing population loss and urban shrinkage since the reunification of Germany in 1990. Hoyerswerda's population has dropped about 40% since its peak and there is a significant lack of teenagers and twenty- to forty-some-year-olds due to the declining birthrates during the uncertainty of reunification. Part of the blight in east Germany is due to the construction and preservation practices of the socialist government under the German Democratic Republic (GDR). To fill the housing needs, the GDR quickly built many prefabricated apartment buildings. In addition, historic preservation of pre-war buildings varied; in some cases, the rubble of buildings destroyed by the war were simply left there while in other cases the debris was removed, and an empty lot remained. Other standing historical structures were left to decay in the early GDR as they did not represent the socialist ideals of the country.

=== Italy ===
In Italy, a well-known case of urban decay is represented by the Vele di Scampia, a large public housing estate built between 1962 and 1975 in the Scampia neighborhood of Naples. The idea behind the project was to provide an urban housing project, where hundreds of families could socialize and create a community. The design included a public transportation rail station, and a park area between the two buildings. The planners wanted to create a small city model with parks, playing fields, and other facilities.

However, various events, starting with the 1980 earthquake in Irpinia, led to urban decay inside this project and in the surrounding areas. Many families left homeless by the earthquake squatted inside the Vele. The lack of police presence led to a rise in Camorra drug trade, as well as other gang and illicit activity.

=== South Africa ===
In South Africa, the most prominent urban decay case is Hillbrow, an inner-city neighborhood of Johannesburg which was formerly affluent. At the end of apartheid in 1994, many middle-class white residents moved out and were replaced by mainly low-income workers and unemployed people, including many refugees and undocumented immigrants from neighboring countries. Many businesses that operated in the area followed their customers to the suburbs, and some apartment buildings were "hijacked" by gangs who collected rentals from residents but failed to pay the utility bills, leading to termination of municipal services and a refusal by the legal owners to invest in maintenance or cleaning. Occupied today by low-income residents and immigrants and being overcrowded, the proliferation of crime, drugs, illegal businesses, and decay of properties have become prevalent.

=== United Kingdom ===
Like many industrial nations before the Second World War, the United Kingdom carried out extensive slum clearances. These efforts continued after the war; however, in many of these slums, depopulation became common, producing compounding decay. The UK is unlike much of Europe in having high overall population density but low urban population density outside of London. In London, many former slum neighbourhoods like in Islington became "highly prized"; however, this was the exception to the rule, and much of the north of England remains deprived.

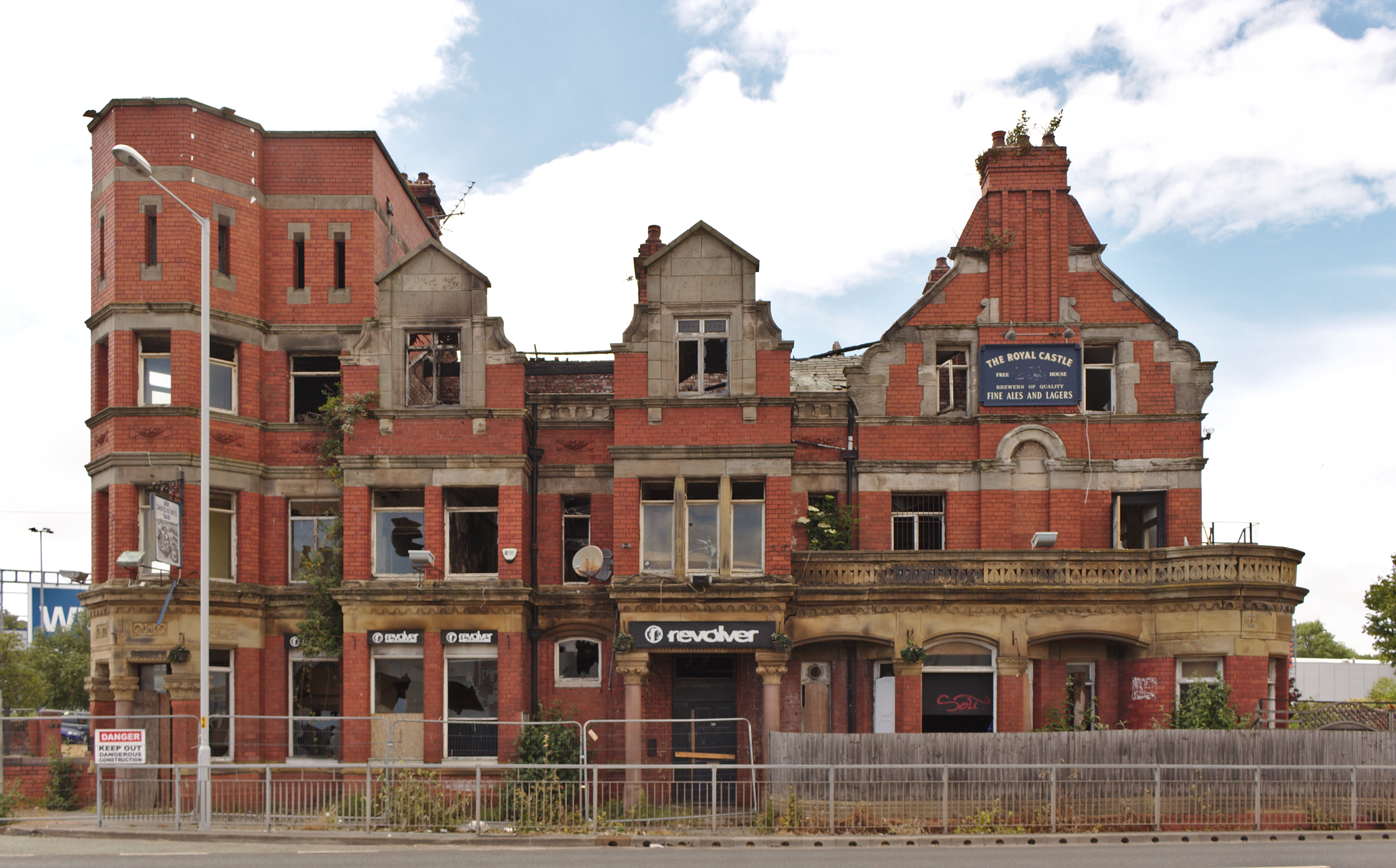
Many areas that suffered population decline from the 1970s still have signs of urban decay, such as this derelict building in Birkenhead, Merseyside.

The Joseph Rowntree Foundation in the 1980s and 1990s undertook extensive studies culminating with a 1991 report, which analyzed the 20 most difficult council estates. Many of the most unpopular estates were in East London, Newcastle upon Tyne, Greater Manchester, Glasgow, the South Wales valleys, and Liverpool, their unpopularity driven by a variety of causes from the loss of key industries, population decline, and counterurbanization.

Population decline in particular was noted to be faster in inner-city areas than in outer ones; however, a decline was noted throughout the 1970s, through the 1990s in both inner- and outer-city areas. Jobs declined between 1984 and 1991 (a decline observed particularly among men), while outer areas saw job growth (particularly among women). The UK also saw urban areas become more ethnically diverse; however, urban decline was not limited to areas which saw population changes. Manchester in 1991 had a non-white population 7.5% higher than the national average, but Newcastle had a 1% smaller non-white population.

Features of British urban decay analyzed by the Foundation included empty houses, widespread demolitions, declining property values, and low demand for all property types, neighborhoods, and tenures.

Urban decay has been found by the Foundation to be "more extreme and therefore more visible" in the north of the United Kingdom. This trend of northern decline has been observed not just in the United Kingdom but also in much of Europe. Some seaside resort towns have also experienced urban decay towards the end of the 20th century. The UK's period of urban decay was exemplified by popular songs, such as The Specials' 1981 single "Ghost Town" and The Jam's 1978 single "Down in the Tube Station at Midnight".

=== United States ===
Historically in the United States, the white middle class gradually left the cities for suburban areas due to African-American migration north toward cities after World War I.

Some historians differentiate between the first Great Migration (1910–1930), numbering about 1.6 million African-American migrants who left mostly Southern rural areas to migrate to northern and Midwestern industrial cities, and, after a lull during the Great Depression, a Second Great Migration (1940–1970), in which 5 million or more African-Americans moved, including many to California and various western cities.

Between 1910 and 1970, African-Americans moved from Southern states, especially Alabama, Louisiana, Mississippi, and Texas, to other regions of the United States, many of them townspeople with urban skills. By the end of the Second Great Migration, African-Americans had become an urbanized population, with more than 80% of Black Americans living in cities. A majority of 53 percent remained in the South, while 40 percent lived in the Northeast and Midwest and 7 percent in the West.

From the 1930s until 1977, African-Americans seeking borrowed capital for housing and businesses were discriminated against via the federal government–legislated discriminatory lending practices for the Federal Housing Administration (FHA) via redlining. In 1977, the U.S. Congress passed the Community Reinvestment Act, designed to encourage commercial banks and savings associations to help meet the needs of borrowers in all segments of their communities, including low- and moderate-income neighborhoods.

Later urban centers were drained further through the advent of mass car ownership, the marketing of suburbia as a location to move to, and the building of the Interstate Highway System. In North America, this shift manifested itself in strip malls, suburban retail and employment centers, and low-density housing estates. Large areas of many northern cities in the United States experienced population decreases and a degradation of urban areas.

Inner-city property values declined, and economically disadvantaged populations moved in. In the U.S., the new inner-city poor were often African-Americans that migrated from the South in the 1920s and 1930s. As they moved into traditionally white neighborhoods, ethnic frictions served to accelerate flight to the suburbs.

== Policy responses ==
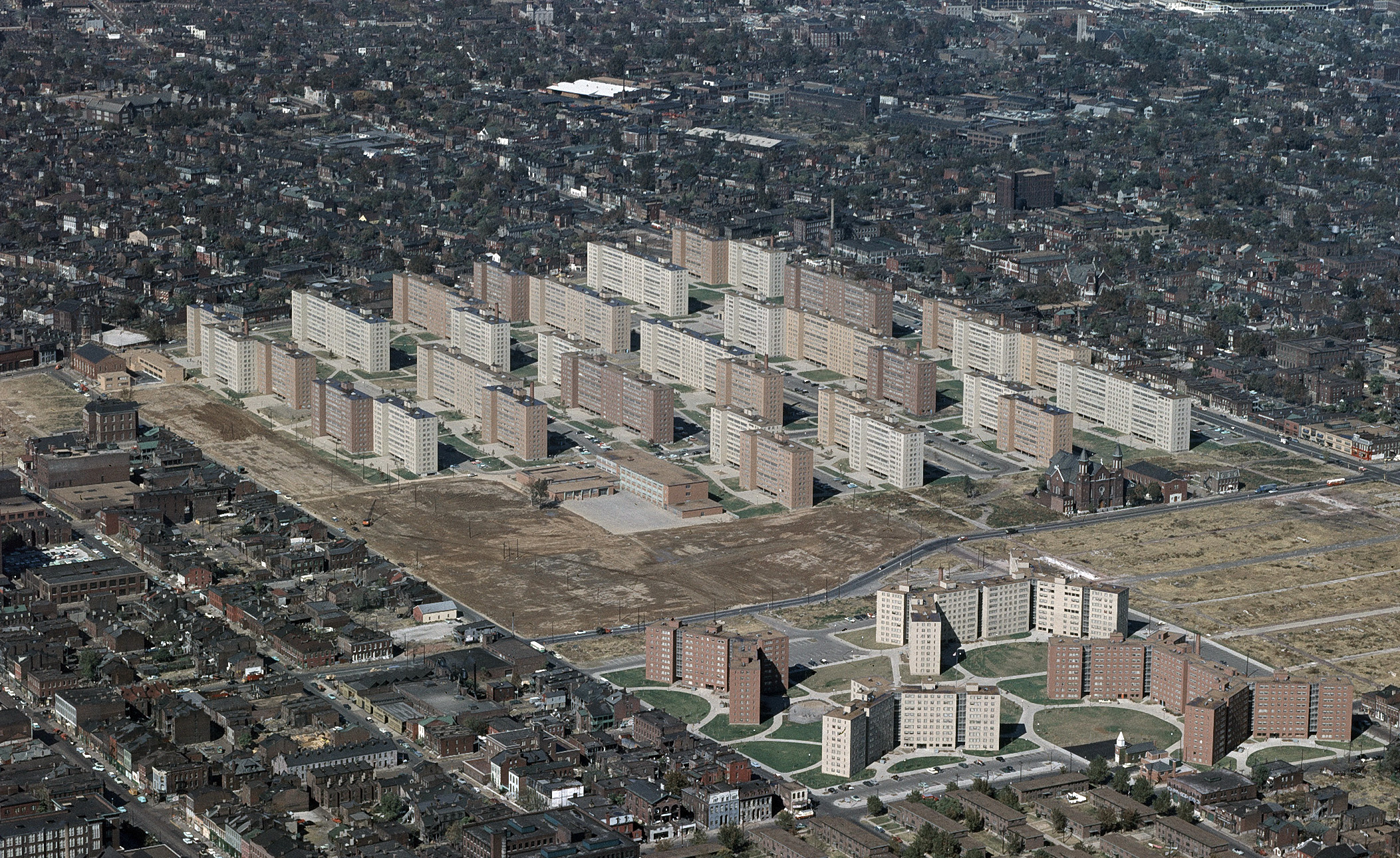
Pruitt–Igoe public housing, St. Louis, Missouri. This urban renewal project was built in the 1950s; it failed and was razed in the 1970s.

The main responses to urban decay have been through positive public intervention and policy, through a plethora of initiatives, funding streams, and agencies, using the principles of New Urbanism (or through Urban Renaissance, its UK/European equivalent). Gentrification has also had a significant effect, and remains the primary means of a natural remedy.

=== Europe ===
In Western Europe, where undeveloped land is scarce and urban areas are generally recognized as the drivers of the new information and service economies, urban renewal has become an industry in itself, with hundreds of agencies and charities set up to tackle the issue. European cities have the benefit of historical organic development patterns already concurrent to the New Urbanist model, and although derelict, most cities have attractive historical quarters and buildings ripe for redevelopment.

In the inner-city estates and suburban cities, the solution is often more drastic, with 1960s and 1970s state housing projects being demolished and rebuilt in a more traditional European urban style, with a mix of housing types, sizes, prices, and tenures, as well as a mix of other uses such as retail or commercial. One of the best examples of this is in Hulme, Manchester, which was cleared of 19th-century housing in the 1950s to make way for a large estate of high-rise flats. During the 1990s, it was cleared again to make way for new development built along new urbanist lines.

=== United States ===
In the United States, early government policies included "urban renewal" and building of large-scale housing projects for the poor. Urban renewal demolished entire neighborhoods in many inner cities and it was as much a cause of urban decay as a remedy. These government efforts are now thought by many to have been misguided.

For multiple reasons including increased demand for urban amenities, some cities have rebounded from these policy mistakes. Meanwhile, some of the inner suburbs built in the 1950s and 1960s are beginning the process of decay, as those who are living in the inner city are pushed out due to gentrification.

== See also ==
General

- Benign neglect
- Black flight
- Brownfield
- Crime prevention through environmental design
- Dead mall
- Deindustrialization
- Depleted community
- Deurbanization
- Fenceline community
- Food desert
- Gentrification, the reverse process
- Ghetto tax
- Ghost town
- Greyfield
- Land recycling
- Modern ruins
- Municipal disinvestment
- NIMBY
- Passive rewilding
- Population decline
- Redlining
- Rural flight, the country counterpart
- Shrinking cities
- Slum clearance
- Spatial mismatch, mismatch between job location and residence
- Survivalism
- Retail apocalypse
- Rural ghetto
- Rural poverty
- Ruin porn
- Urban exploration
- Urban prairie
- Urbicide
- White flight

Specific

- Urban economics
- Urban planning
- Urban theory
