= Plaatjieskraal =

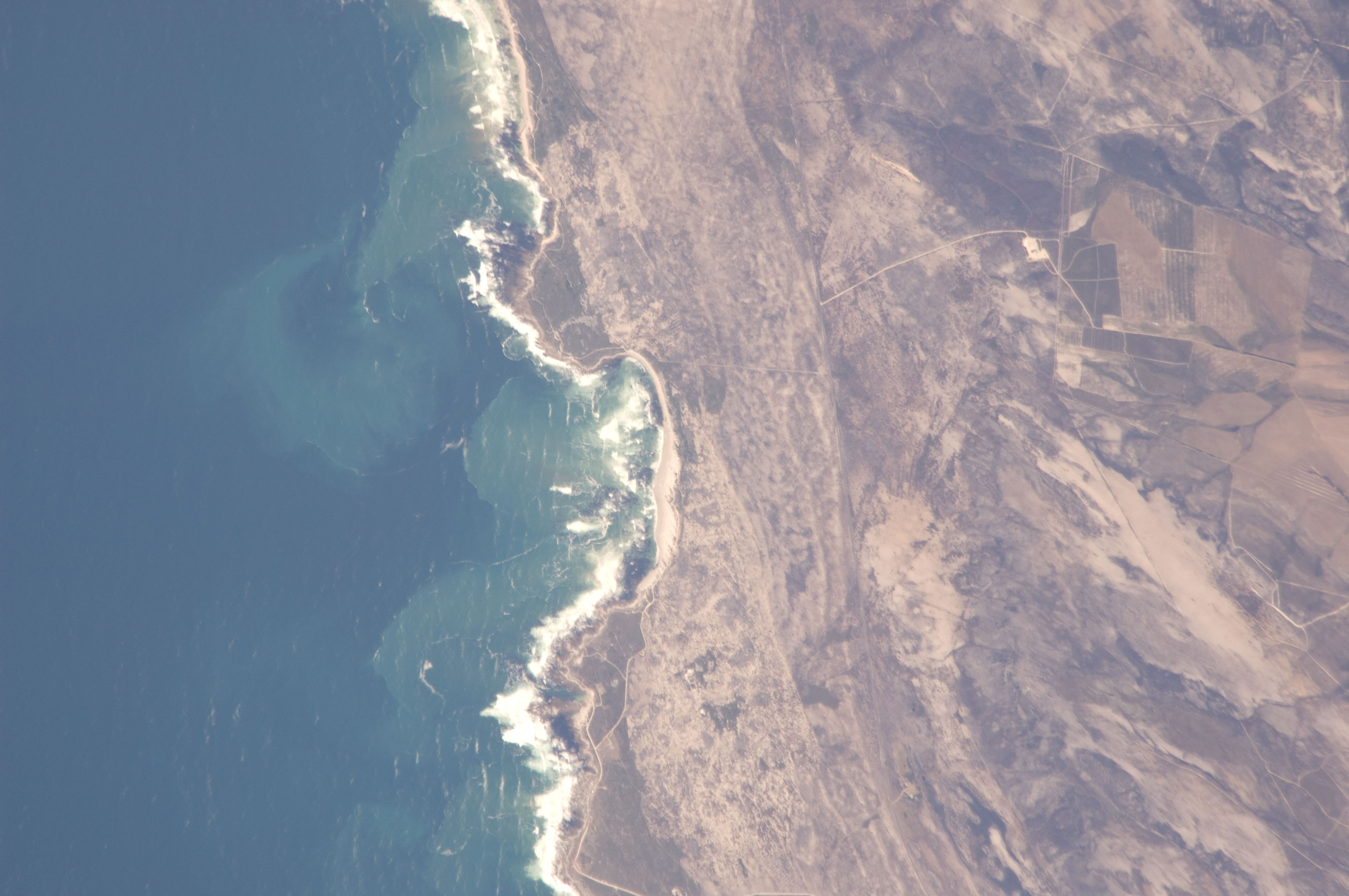
- View of Plaatjieskraal from space.

- Location within Western Cape Location within South Africa
- Coordinates: 34°43′46″S 19°35′50″E
- Country: South Africa
- Province: Western Cape
- District: Overberg
- Municipality: Overstrand
- Established: 1980s
- Abandoned: 2010
- Website: https://www.facebook.com/plaatjieskraalspookdorp

Plaatjieskraal is a ghost town in the Western Cape province of South Africa located about 10 km southeast of Pearly Beach and 10 km southwest of Wolvengat.

== History ==
The town was established in the 1980s, but was abandoned around 2010 and has since been taken over by sand dunes.

The town was built by the district municipality for people living in Elim and Bredasdorp. The town consists of 23 houses.
