= List of valleys of Italy =

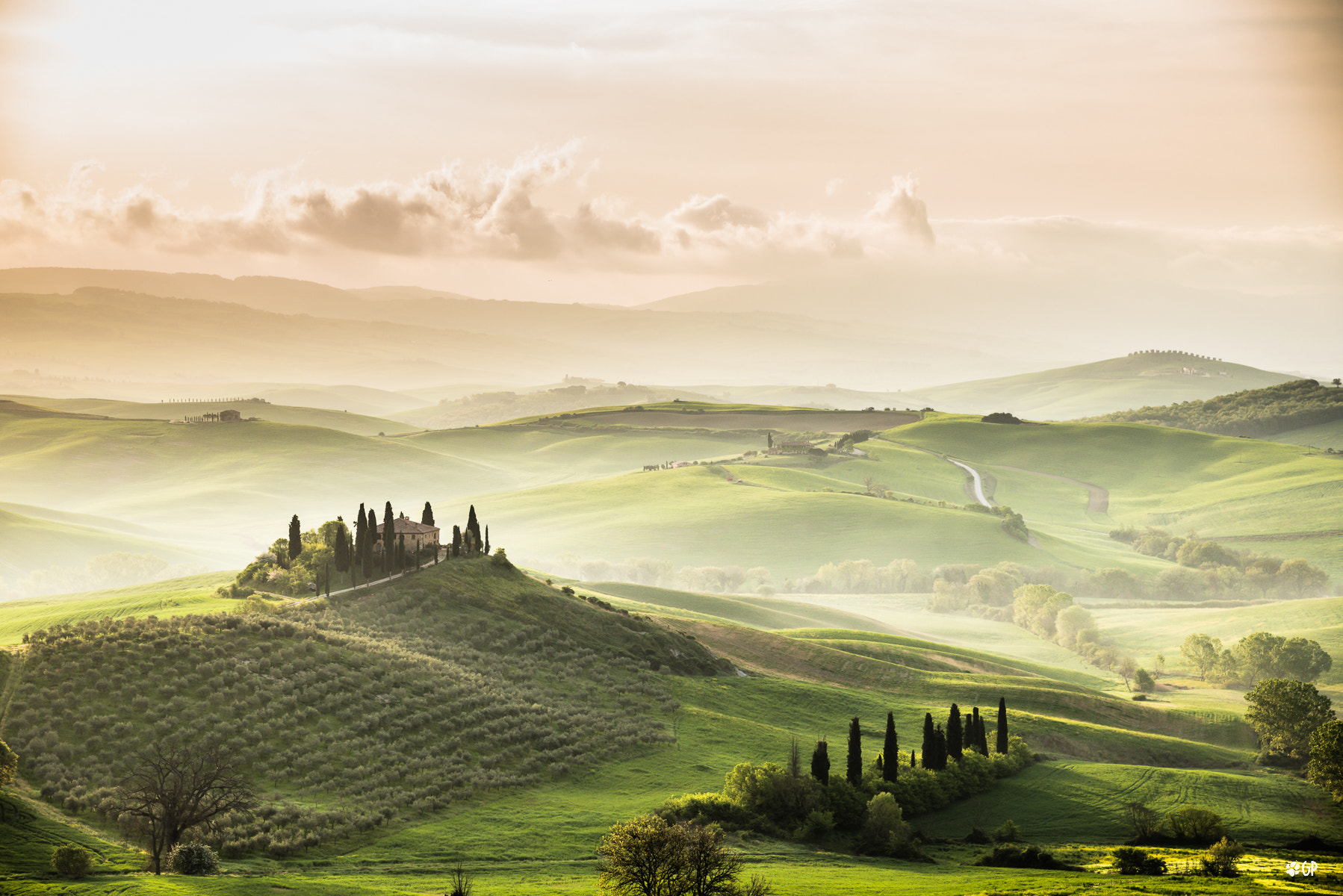
Val d'Orcia was added to the UNESCO list of World Heritage Sites in 2004.

This is a list of valleys in Italy.

== Valleys of Italy ==
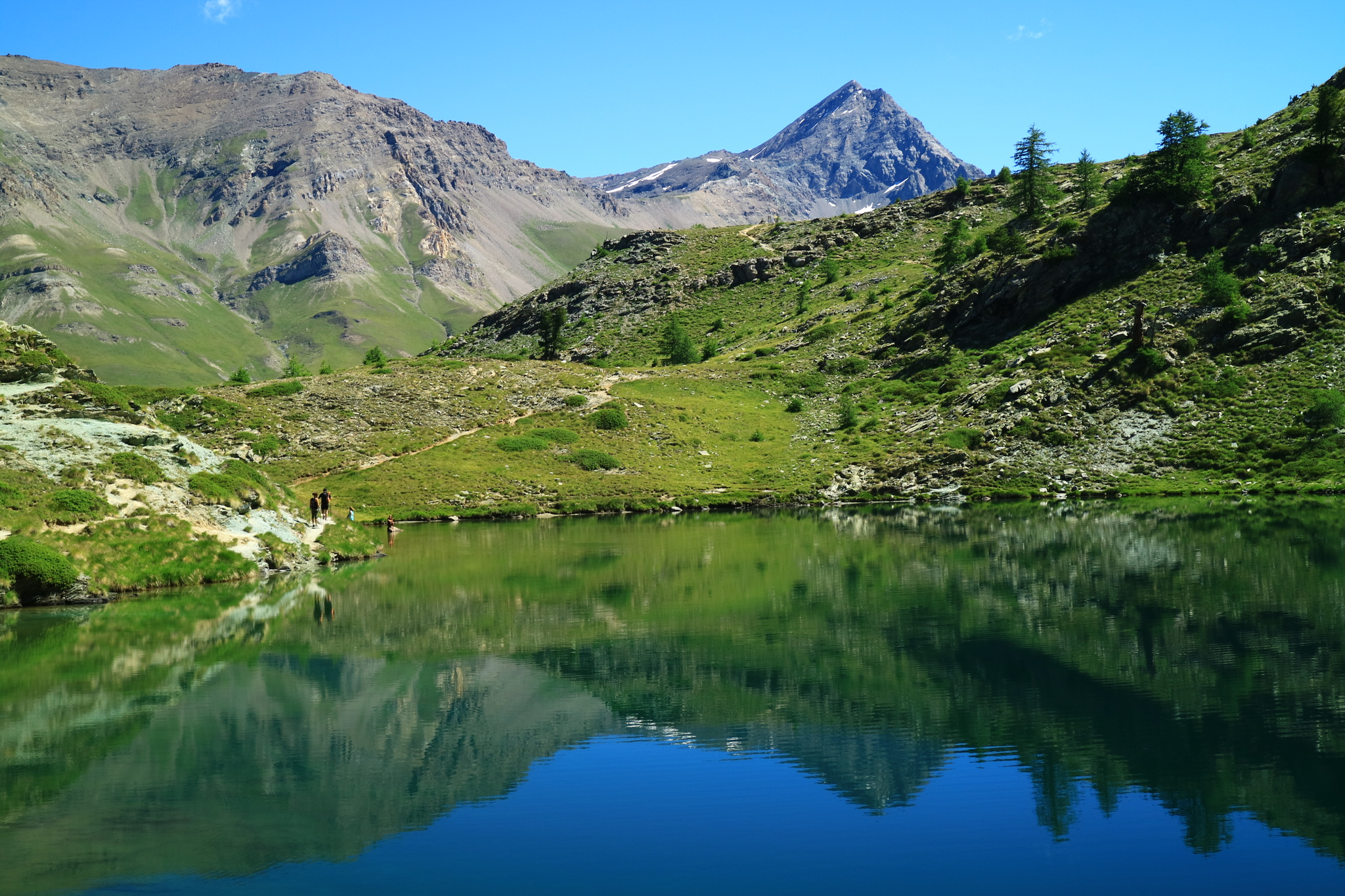
Cogne Valley

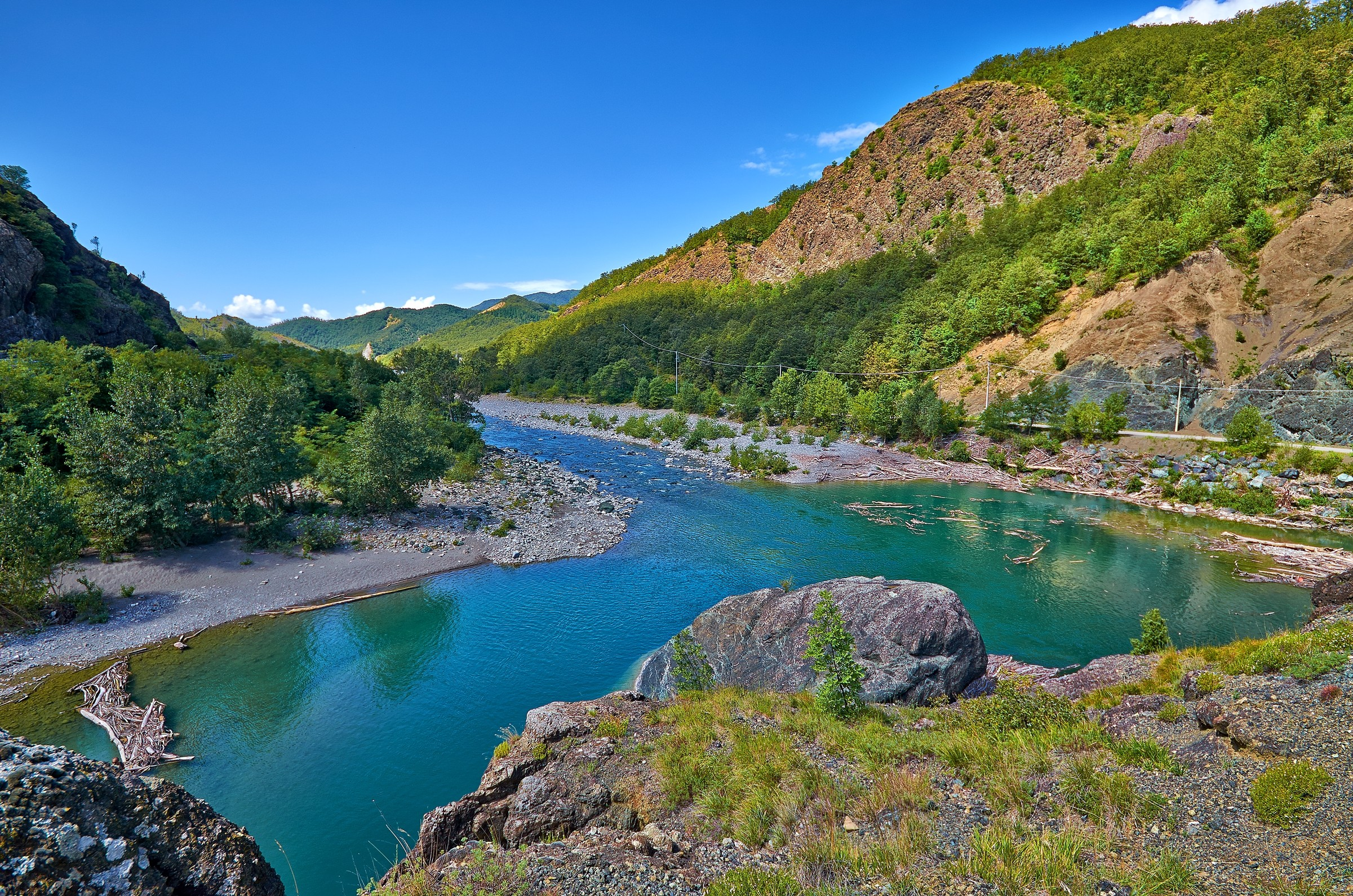
Val di Taro

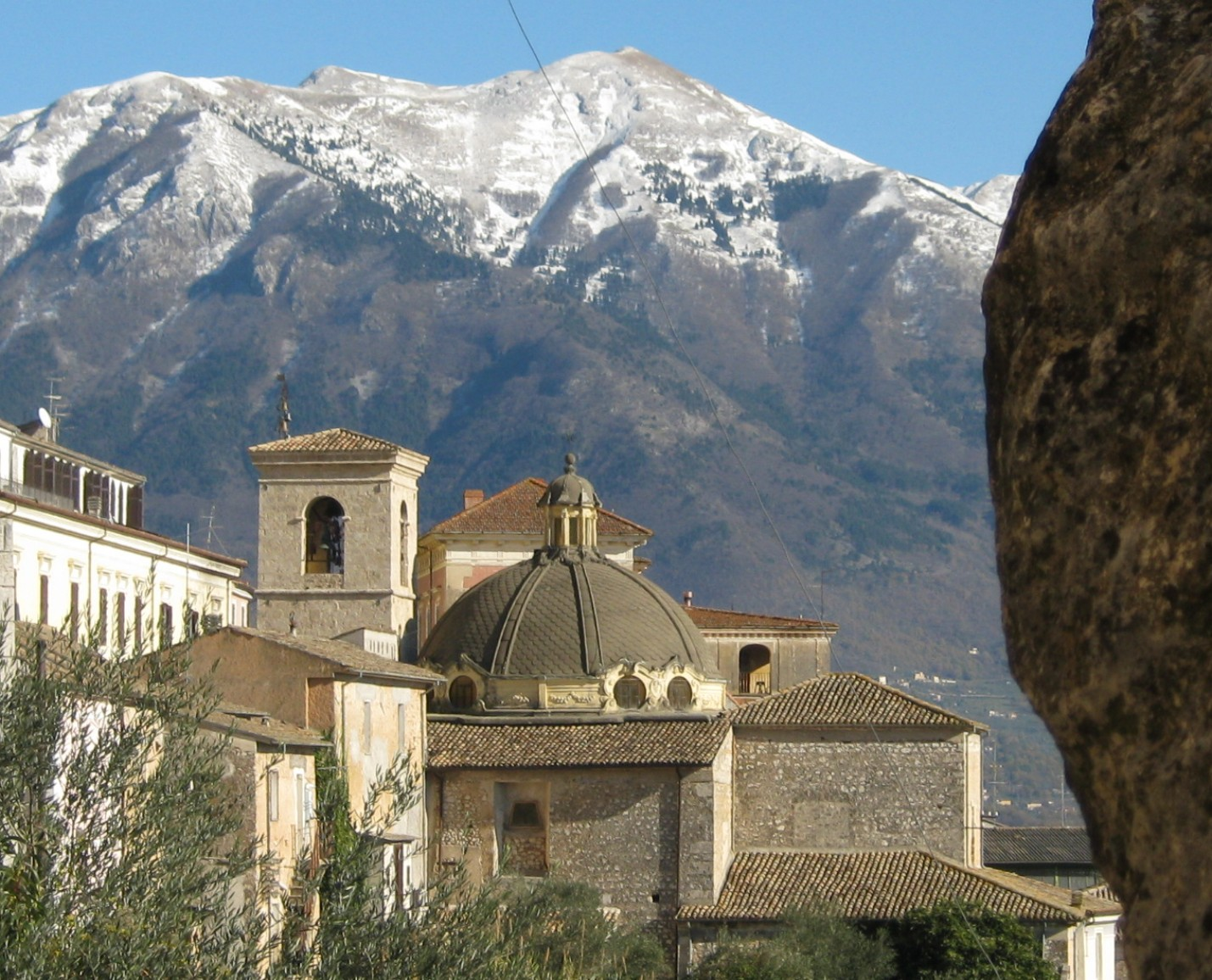
Valle di Comino

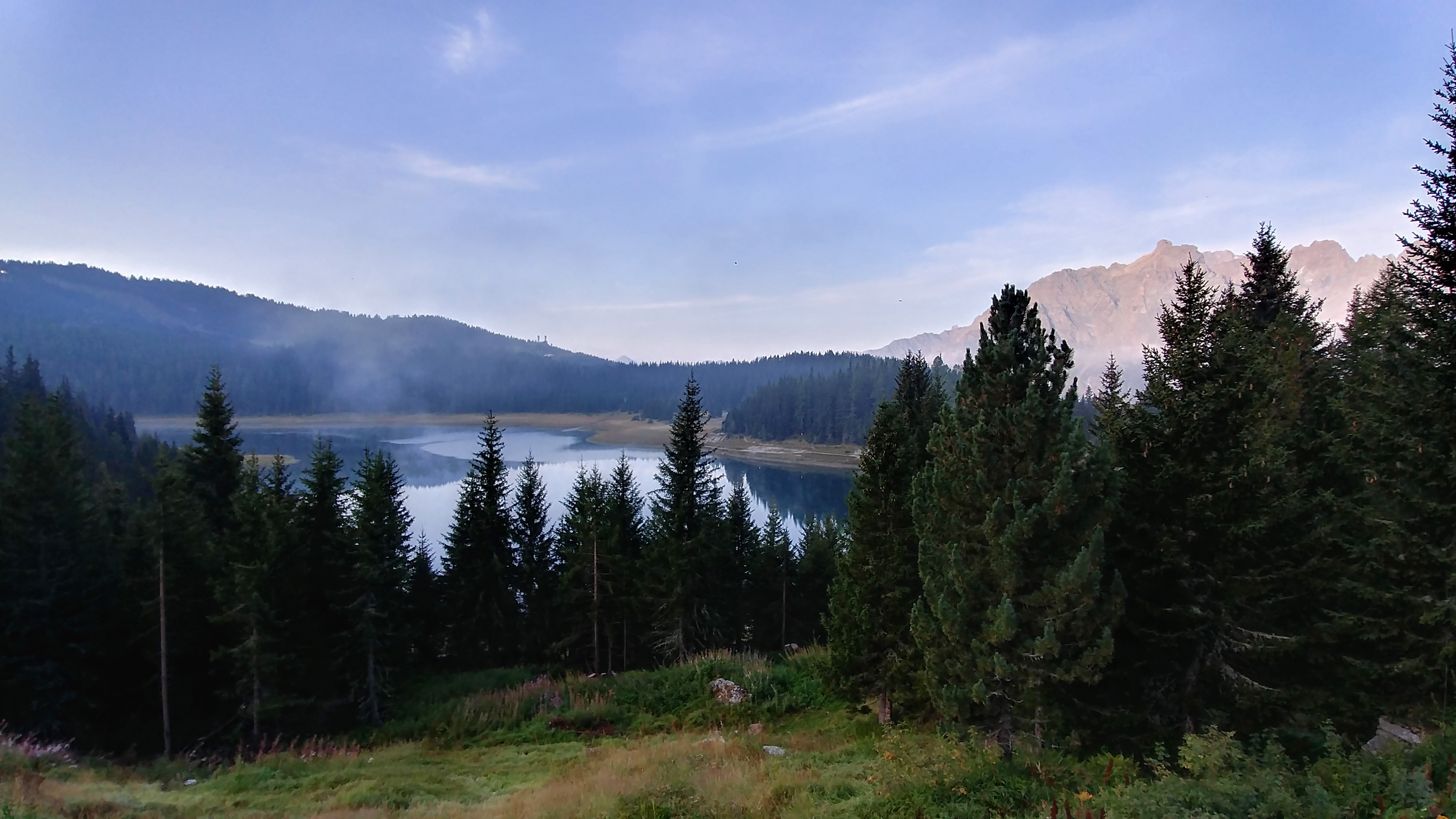
Valtellina

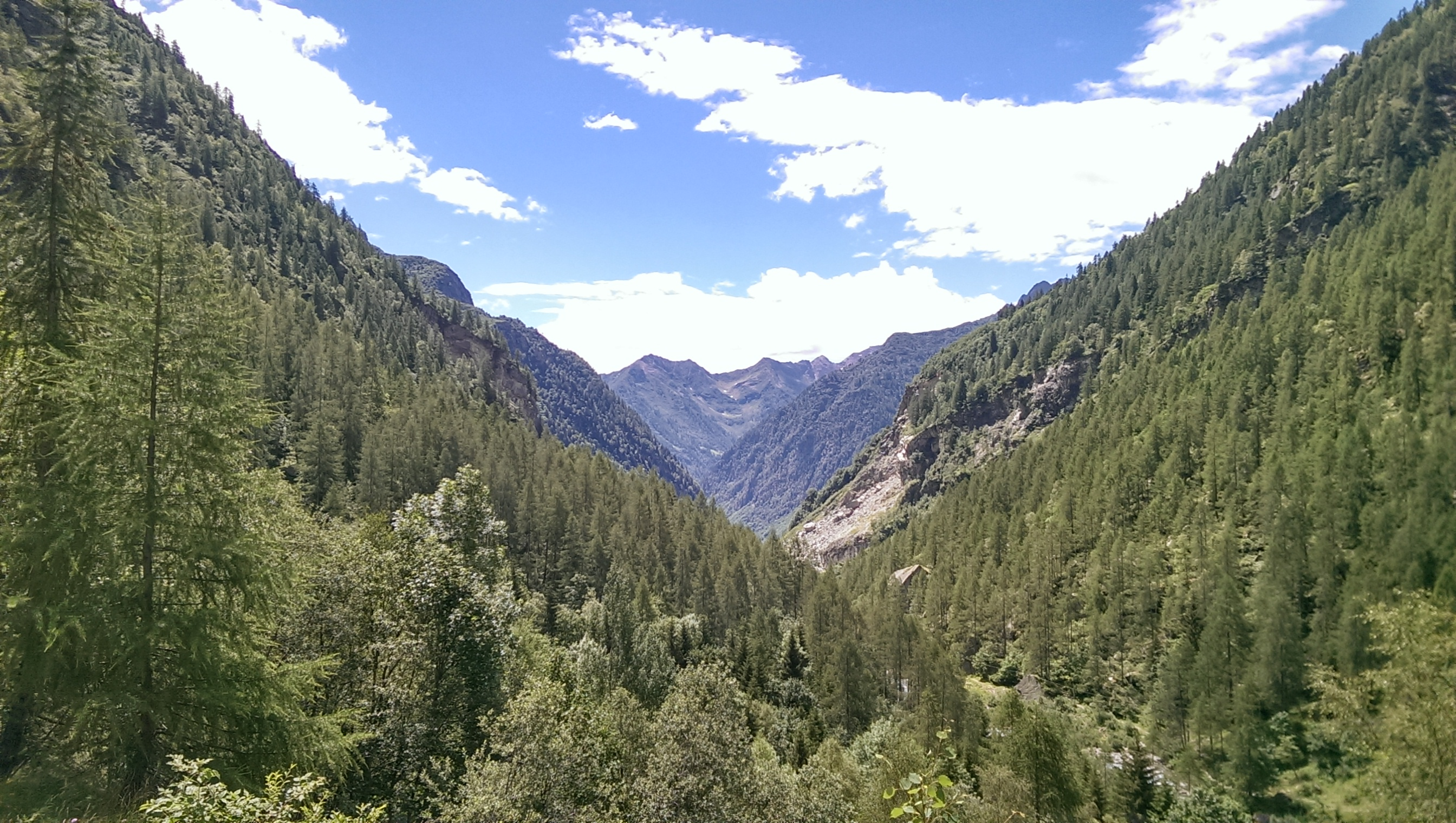
Valsesia

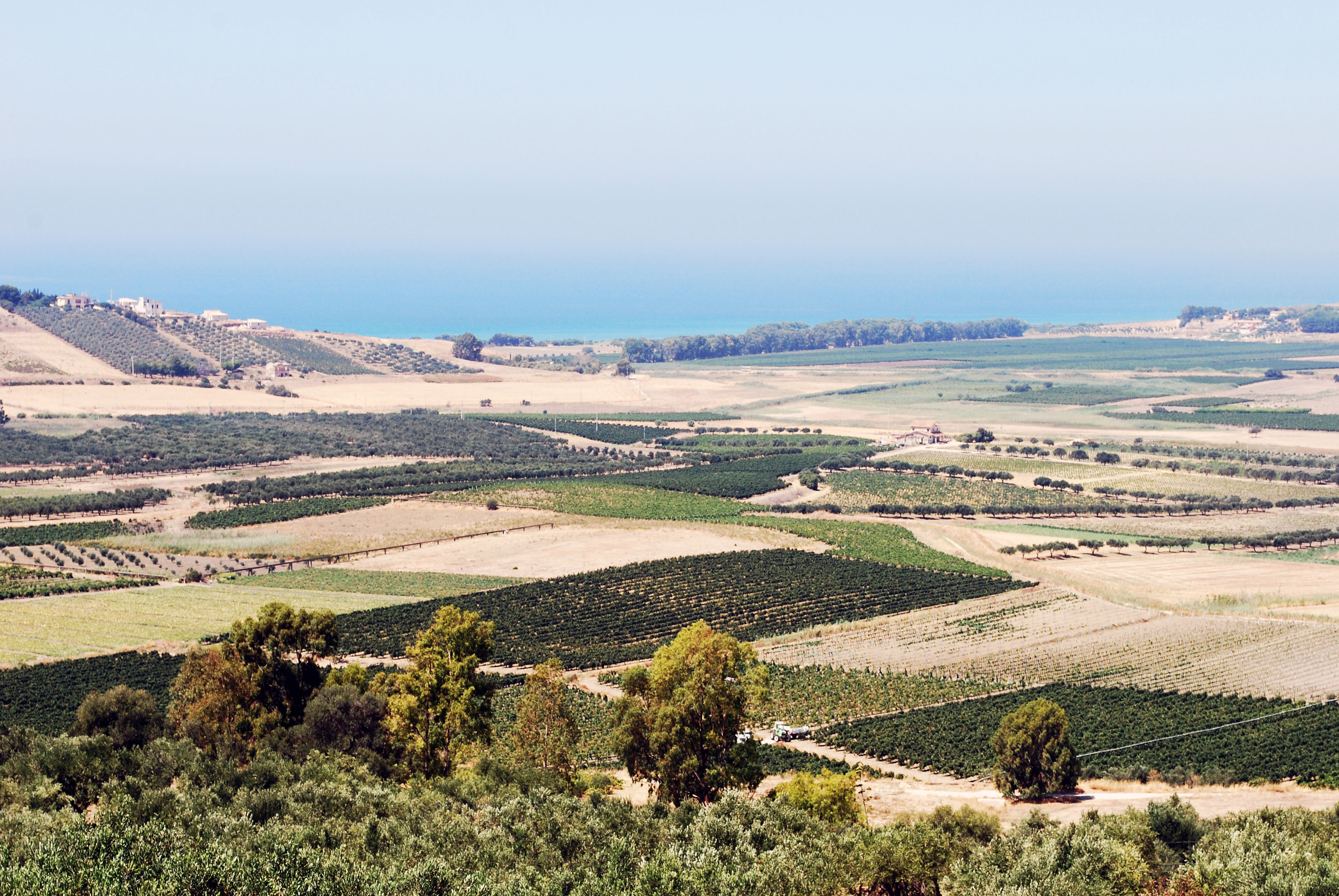
Valle del Belice

=== Abruzzo ===
- Valle Peligna

=== Aosta Valley ===
- Cogne Valley
- Val Ferret
- Valdigne
- Valnontey
- Valpelline
- Val Veny

=== Apulia ===
- Itria Valley

=== Calabria ===
- Vallata dello Stilaro

=== Campania ===
- Vallo di Diano
- Vallone dei Mulini

=== Emilia-Romagna ===
- Val d'Aveto
- Val di Taro
- Val Nure

=== Friuli-Venezia Giulia ===
- Rosandra Valley

=== Lazio ===
- Valle di Comino
- Valle Latina
- Vallelunga
- Rieti Valley

=== Liguria ===
- Val d'Aveto
- Val Polcevera

=== Lombardy ===
- Astino Valley
- Val Bregaglia
- Val Brembana
- Val Camonica
- Valchiavenna
- Valganna
- Valle Sabbia
- Valsassina
- Val Taleggio
- Val Trompia
- Valassina
- Valle Spluga
- Valtellina
- Valtorta

=== Piedmont ===
- Valle Antigorio
- Val Borbera
- Cervo Valley
- Val Chisone
- Chiusella Valley
- Valle Germanasca
- Valle Gesso
- Valle Grana
- Lanzo Valleys
- Maira Valley
- Occitan Valleys
- Orco Valley
- Ossola
- Val Pellice
- Valle Po
- Valsesia
- Sessera Valley
- Simplon Valley
- Strona di Mosso Valley
- Valle Stura di Demonte
- Susa Valley
- Valle Vigezzo
- Val Vogna
- Varaita Valley

=== Sardinia ===
- Piscinamanna

=== Sicily ===
- Valle del Belice

=== South Tyrol ===
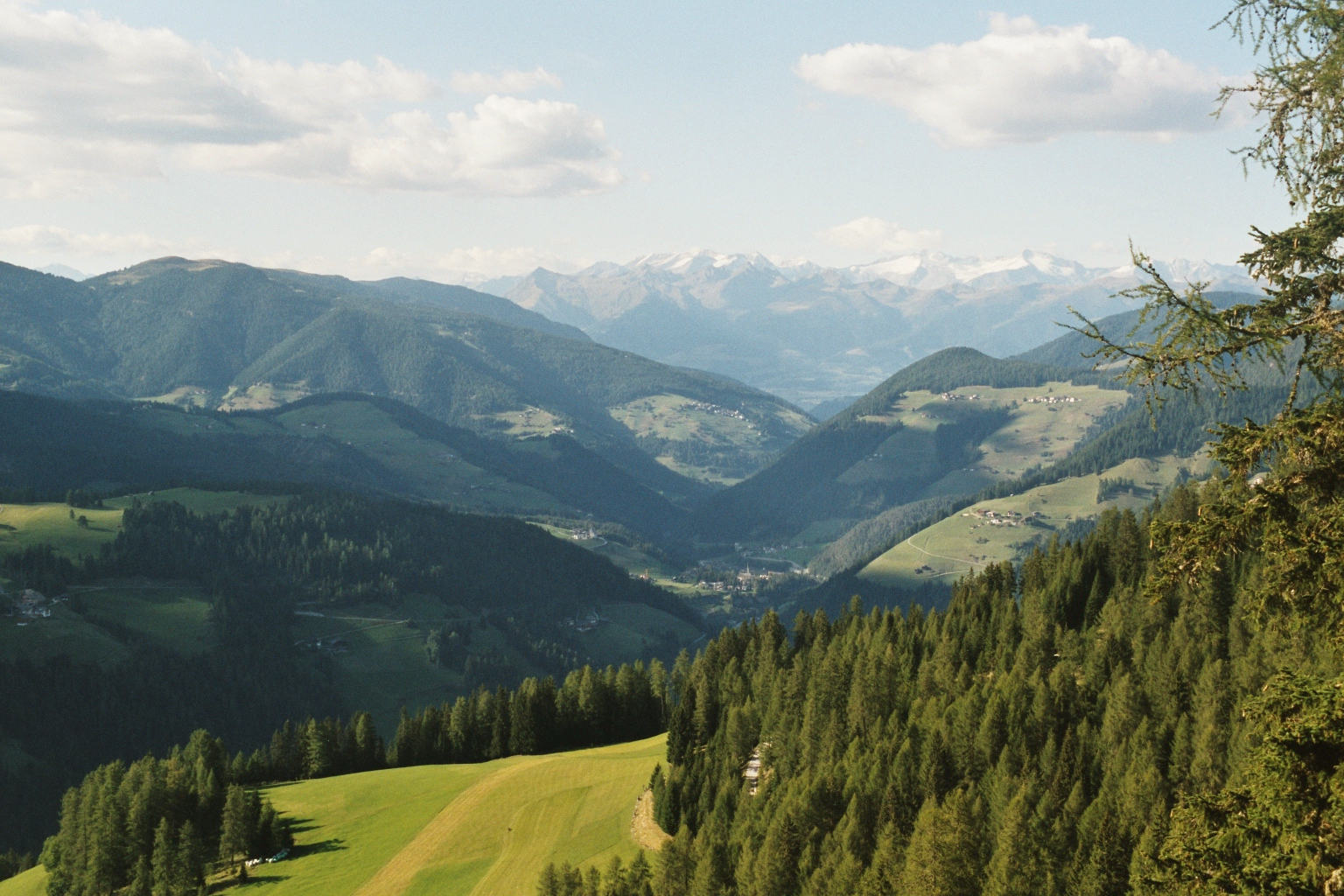
Val Badia

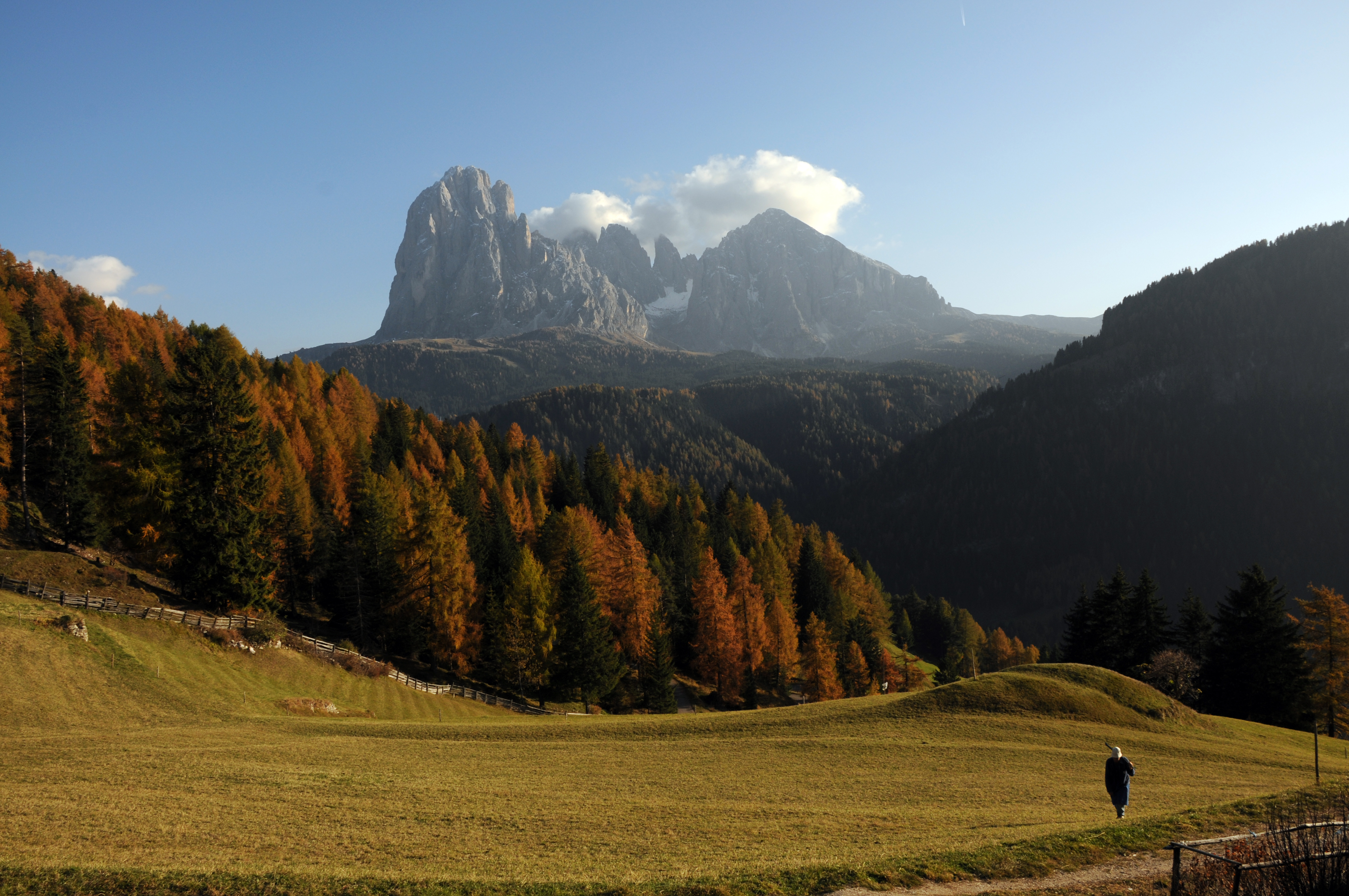
Val Gardena

- Brantental
- Durnholzer Tal
- Eggental
- Etschtal
- Hochpustertal
- Höhlensteintal
- Matscher Tal
- Mittagstal
- Passeier Valley
- Pfelderer Tal
- Pfitschtal
- Puster Valley
- Ridnauntal
- Sarntal
- Schnalstal
- Sextental
- Suldental
- Tauferer Ahrntal
- Tierser Tal
- Ulten Valley
- Val Badia
- Val Gardena
- Vallelunga
- Valler Tal
- Wipptal
- Zerzer Tal

=== Trentino ===
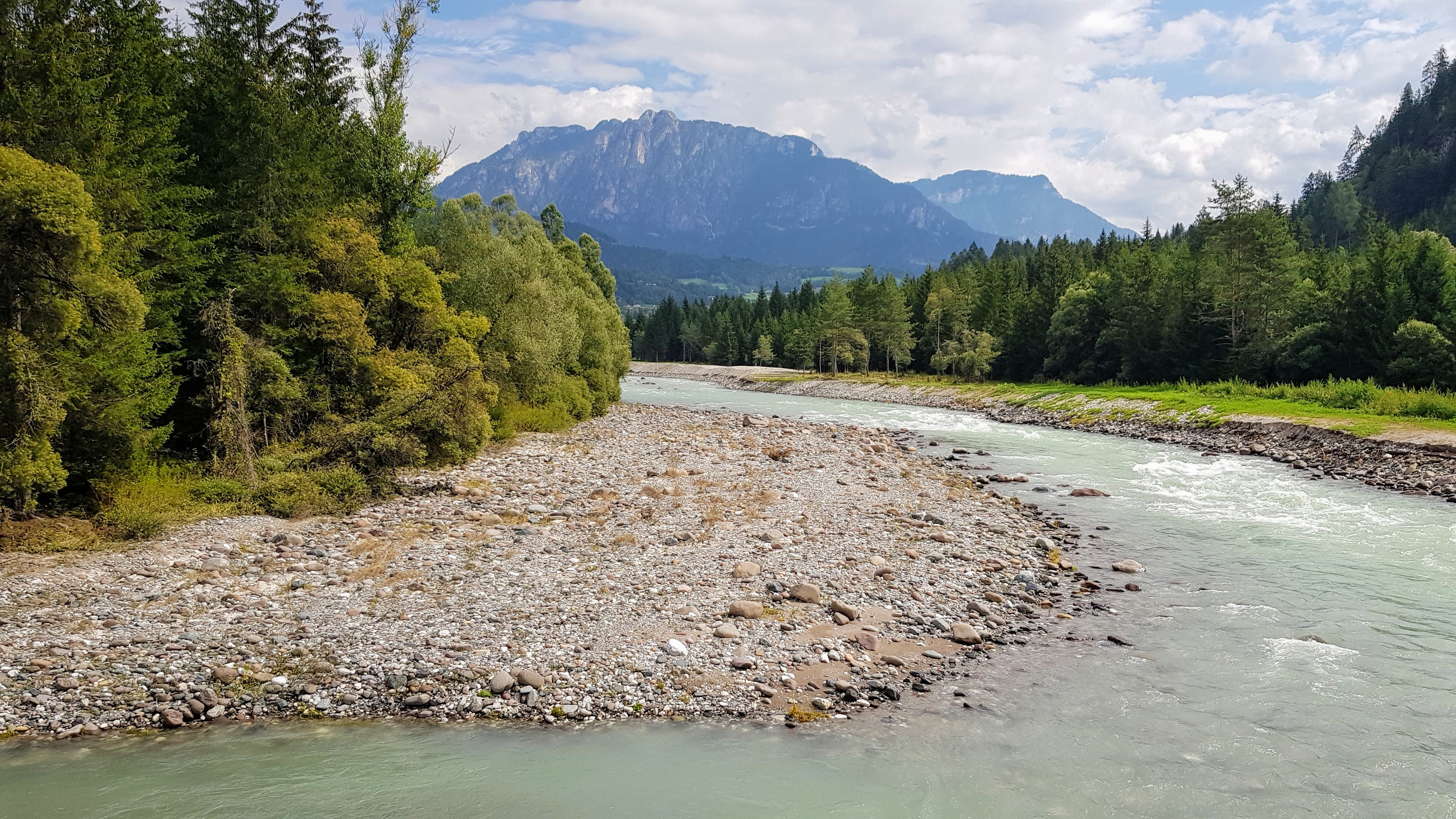
Fiemme Valley

- Brenta Valley
- Bersntol
- Fassa Valley
- Fiemme Valley
- Giudicarie
- Lagarina Valley
- Noana Valley
- Non Valley
- Primiero
- Val di Sole
- Val Rendena
- Valsugana

=== Tuscany ===
- Casentino
- Valdelsa
- Mugello
- Val d'Orcia
- Val di Merse
- Valdarno
- Valdichiana
- Valdinievole
- Valtiberina

=== Umbria ===
- Valdichiana
- Valtiberina
