= Vallelunga (disambiguation) =

Vallelunga or Valle Lunga (Italian: long valley) may refer to:

== Places ==
- Vallelunga (South Tyrol), a valley in Italy
- Vallelunga (Campagnano di Roma), a valley in Italy
  - Vallelunga Circuit, a motor racing circuit in the valley of Vallelunga, Campagnano, Lazio, Italy
- Valle Lunga, a frazione (district) of the San Giovanni Teatinocommune (municipality) of San Giovanni Teatino in Chieti, Abruzzo, Italy

== Other uses ==
- De Tomaso Vallelunga, an Italian sports car
- Marquis of Valle Lunga; see List of marquesses in Italy

== See also ==
- Vallelonga, Vibo Valentia, Calabria, Italy; a commune
- Vallelonga (surname)
- Valle (disambiguation)
- Lunga (disambiguation)
- Longa (disambiguation)
