= Sorrento =

City in Campania, Italy

Sorrento Sorrento (Italian) Surriento (Neapolitan)
- Comune
- Città di Sorrento
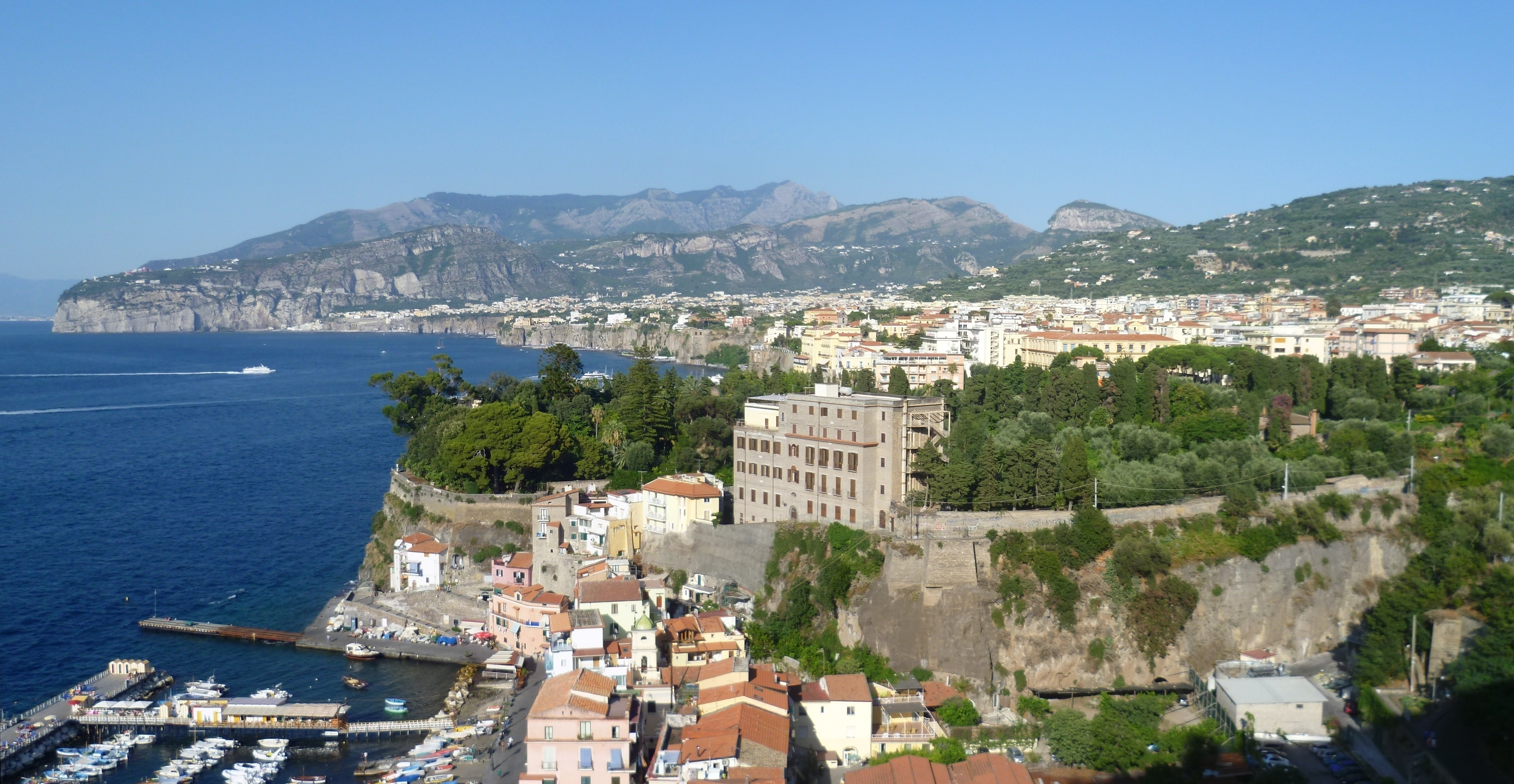
- Sorrento and the Bay of Naples

- Coat of arms

- Location within Italy Location within Campania
- Coordinates: 40°37′34″N 14°22′34″E
- Country: Italy
- Region: Campania
- Metropolitan city: Naples (NA)
- Frazioni: Casarlano, Cesarano, Marano, Priora, Santa Lucia, Sorrento Capo, Sorrento Marina Grande

Government
  - Mayor: Corrado Fattorusso (since 2026)

Area
  - Total: 9 km^{2} (3.5 sq mi)
- Elevation: 50 m (160 ft)

Population (2025)
  - Total: 15,163
  - Density: 1,700/km^{2} (4,400/sq mi)
- Demonym(s): Sorrentino/Sorrentini (masculine), Sorrentina/Sorrentine (feminine)
- Time zone: UTC+1 (CET)
  - Summer (DST): UTC+2 (CEST)
- Postal code: 80060 and 80067
- Dialing code: 081
- Patron saint: St. Antoninus
- Saint day: February 14
- Website: comune.sorrento.na.it

Sorrento (/səˈrɛntoʊ/ sə-REN-toh; Italian: Sorrento [sorˈrɛnto]; Neapolitan: Surriento [surˈrjendə]; Latin: Surrentum), officially Comune di Sorrento (Municipality of Sorrento) is a city and comune overlooking the Bay of Naples in Southern Italy. A popular tourist destination, Sorrento is located on the Sorrentine Peninsula at the southern terminus of a main branch of the Circumvesuviana rail network, within easy access from Naples and Pompei. The city is widely known for its small ceramics, lacework and marquetry (woodwork) shops.

The Sorrentine Peninsula has views of Naples, Vesuvius and the Isle of Capri. The Amalfi Drive, connecting Sorrento and Amalfi, is a narrow road along the high cliffs above the Tyrrhenian Sea.

Ferries and hydrofoils connect the city to Naples, Amalfi, Positano, Capri and Ischia.

Limoncello, a digestif made from lemon rinds, alcohol, water and sugar, is produced in Sorrento along with citrus fruit, wine, nuts and olives.

== History ==
=== Origins ===
The Roman name for Sorrento was Surrentum. From the 8th century BC the area had the presence of a community of indigenous villages, which was a crossing point for Etruscan traffic. Subsequently, the area fell into the hands of the Osci, who exercised an important influence there, in fact the oldest ruins of Surrentum are Oscan, dating from about 600 BC.

Before its control by the Roman Republic, Surrentum was one of the towns subject to Nuceria, and shared its fortunes up to the Social War; it seems to have joined in the revolt of 90 BC like Stabiae; and was reduced to obedience in the following year, when it seems to have received a colony.

Numerous sepulchral inscriptions of imperial slaves and freedmen have been found at Surrentum. An inscription shows that Titus in the year after the earthquake of 79 AD restored the horologium (clock) of the town and its architectural decoration. A similar restoration of an unknown building in Naples in the same year is recorded in an inscription from the last-named town.

The most important temples of Surrentum were those of Athena and of the Sirens (the latter the only one in the Greek world in historic times); the former gave its name to the promontory. In antiquity, Surrentum was famous for its wine (oranges and lemons which are now widely cultivated there were not yet introduced in Italy in antiquity), its fish, and its red Campanian vases; the discovery of coins of Massilia, Gaul, and the Balearic Islands here indicates the extensive trade which it carried on.

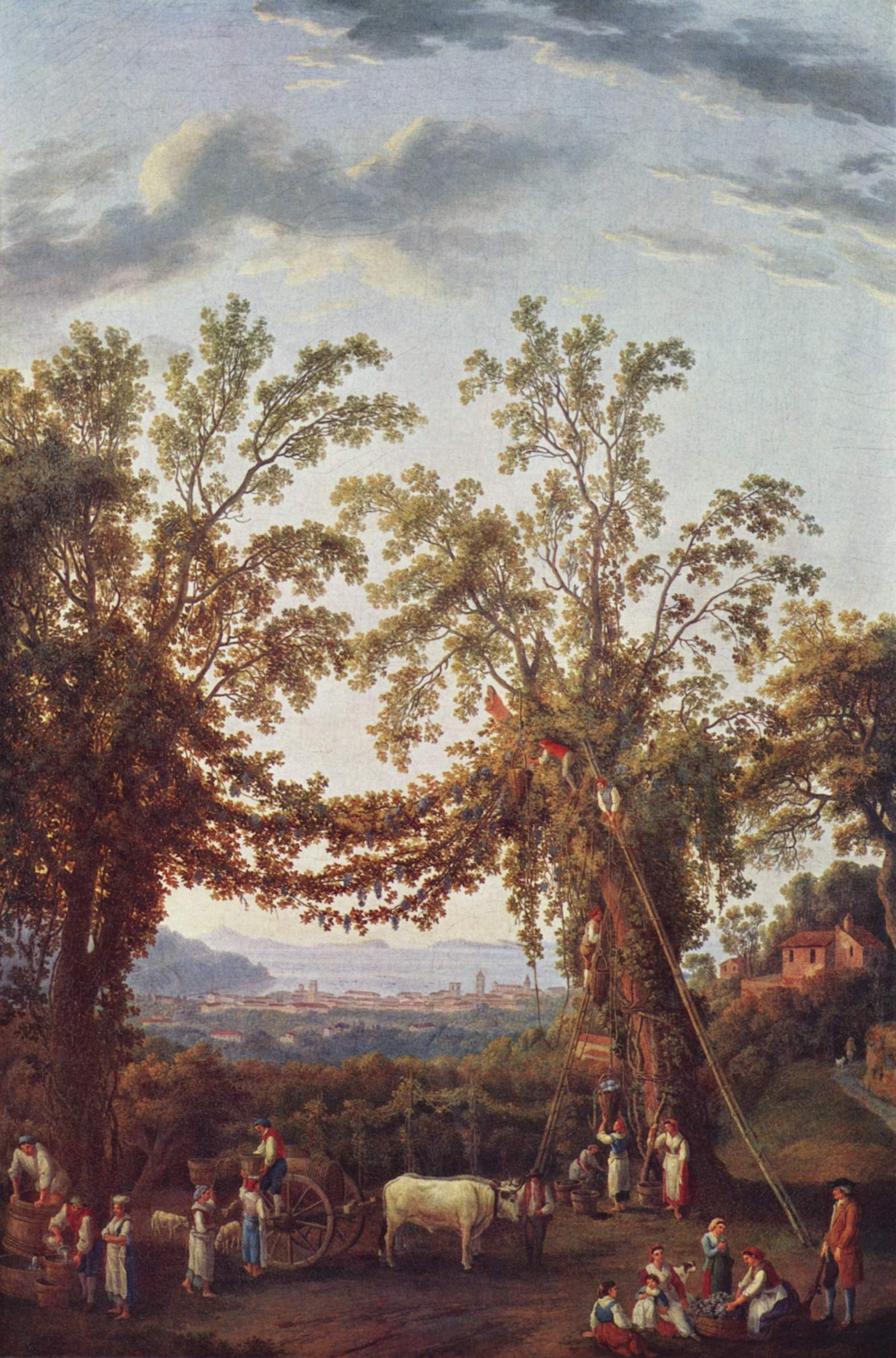
Vintage near Sorrento, Jacob Philipp Hackert, c. 1784.

The position of Surrentum was very secure, protected by deep gorges. The only exception to its natural protection was 300 metres (984 feet) on the south-west where it was defended by walls, the line of which is necessarily followed by those of the modern town. The arrangement of the modern streets preserves that of the ancient town, and the disposition of the walled paths which divide the plain to the east seems to date in like manner from Roman times. No ruins are now preserved in the town itself, but there are many remains in the villa quarter to the east of the town on the road to Stabiae, of which traces still exist, running much higher than the modern road, across the mountain.

The site of one of the largest (possibly belonging to the Imperial house) is now occupied by the Hotel Vittoria, under the terrace of which a small theatre was found in 1855; an ancient rock-cut tunnel descends hence to the shore. Remains of other villas may be seen, but the most important ruin is the reservoir of the (subterranean) aqueducts just outside the town on the east, which had no less than twenty-seven chambers each about 270 by 60 cm (106 by 24 in). Greek and Oscan tombs have also been found.

Another suburb lay below the town and on the promontory on the west of it; under the Hotel Bellevue Syrene are substructions and a rock-hewn tunnel. To the north-west on the Capo di Sorrento is another villa, the so-called Bagni della Regina Giovanna, with baths, and in the bay to the south-west was the villa of Pollius Felix, the friend of Statius, which he describes in Silvae ii. 2, of which remains still exist. Farther west again are villas, as far as the temple of Athena on the promontory named after her at the extremity of the peninsula (now Punta Campanella). Neither of this nor of the famous temple of the Sirens are any traces existing.

In the mythology, according to the Greek historian Diodorus Siculus, Sorrento was founded by Liparus, son of Ausonus, who was king of the Ausoni and the son of Ulysses and Circe. The ancient city was probably connected to the Ausoni tribe, one of the most ancient ethnic groups in the area. In the pre-Roman age, Sorrento was influenced by the Greek civilization: this can be seen in its plant and in the presence of the Athenaion, a great sanctuary, also, according to the legend, founded by Ulysses and originally devoted to the cult of the Sirens, hence Sorrento's name.

=== Middle Ages and modern era ===
Sorrento became an archbishopric around 420 AD. After the fall of the Western Roman Empire, it was ruled by the Ostrogoths and then returned to the Eastern Empire. The Lombards, who conquered much of southern Italy in the second half of the 6th century, besieged it in vain.

In the following centuries the authority of the distant Empire of Byzantium faded; initially part of the substantially independent Duchy of Naples, later Sorrento became in turn an autonomous duchy in the 9th century. It fought against neighbouring/rival Amalfi, the Saracens and the nearby Lombardic duchies, such as that of Duchy of Benevento, whose forces besieged it in 839, although Sorrento was able to resist with Neapolitan help. Sorrentine forces took part in the anti-Saracen leagues at the battles of Licosa (846) and Ostia (849). The duchy was ruled by figures elected by the people, which received honorary titles from the Byzantine Emperor.

In 1035 the city was acquired by Guaimar IV of Salerno, who gave it to his brother Guy. After a brief return under the Duchy of Naples, it returned in Lombard hands with Gisulf II of Salerno; when the latter was defeated by Robert Guiscard, Sorrento entered the Norman sphere of influence: any residual independence was ended in 1137 when it was conquered by Roger II of Sicily, and annexed to the Kingdom of Sicily.

On 13 June 1558 it was sacked by elements of the Ottoman navy under the command of Dragut and his lieutenant Piali, as part of the struggle between the Turks and Spain, which controlled the southern half of Italy at that time. 2,000 captives were reportedly taken away. This struggle was waged throughout the Mediterranean and lasted many decades. The attackers were not "pirates" as often characterised, though some may have been mercenaries from North Africa. The campaigns were conducted on the direct orders of Sultan Suleiman. The attack led to the construction of a new line of walls. The most striking event of the following century was the revolt against Spanish domination of 1648, led by Giovanni Grillo. In 1656 a plague struck the city. However, Sorrento remained one of the most important centres of southern Campania.

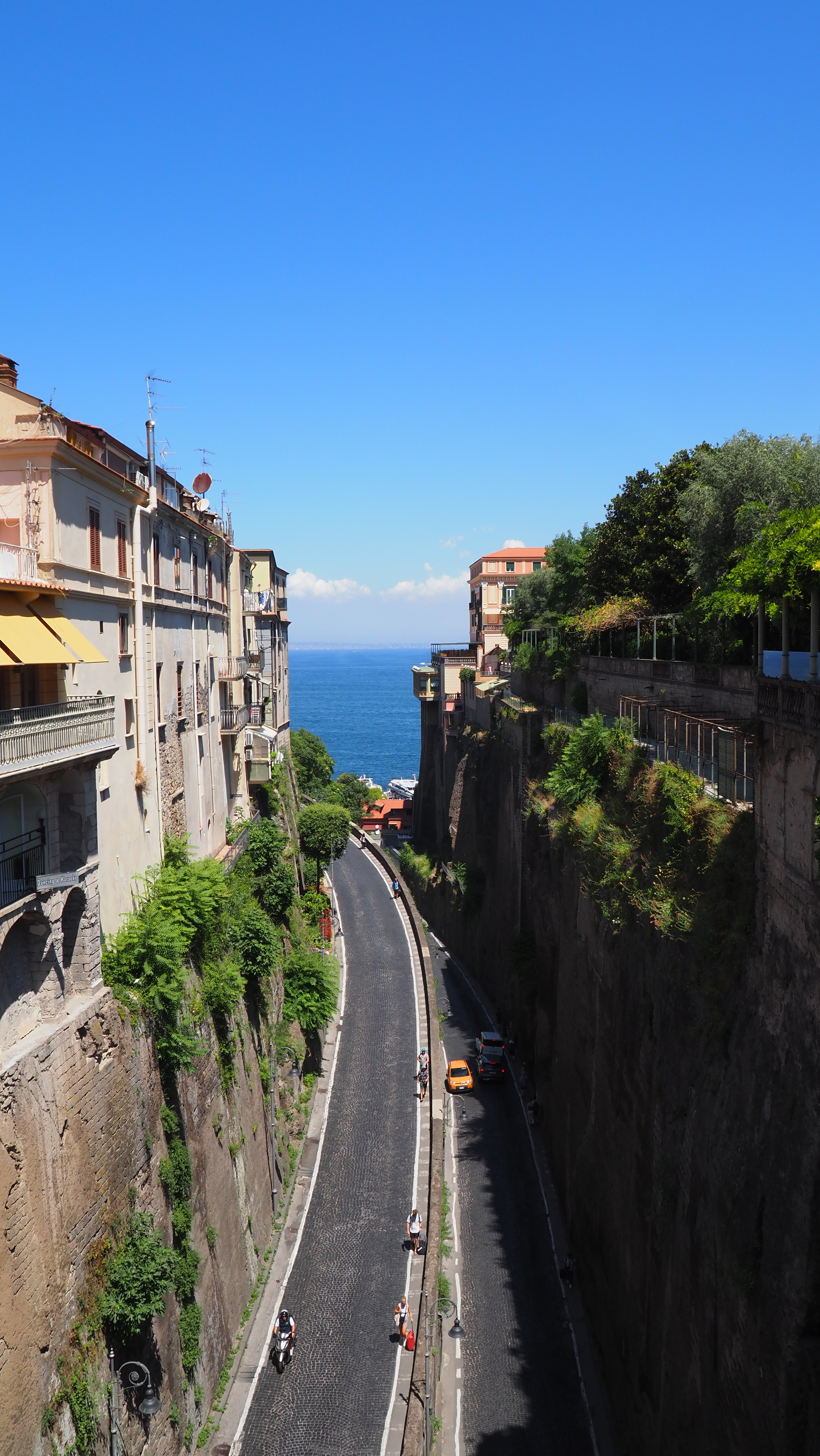
A view from Piazza Tasso.

Sorrento entered into the Neapolitan Republic of 1799, but in vain.

In the 19th century the economy of the city improved markedly, favoured by the development of agriculture, tourism and trade. A route connecting Sorrento to Castellammare di Stabia was opened under the reign of Ferdinand II (1830–1859). In 1861 Sorrento was officially annexed to the new Kingdom of Italy. In the following years it confirmed and increased its status of one of the most renowned tourist destinations of Italy, a trend which continued into the 20th century. Famous people who visited it include Lord Byron, Keats, Goethe, Friedrich Nietzsche, Henrik Ibsen and Walter Scott.

== Fortifications and castles ==
Having been a city victim of numerous attacks by pirates for its riches, Sorrento boasted in the past numerous castles and fortifications, especially on the strip of land that runs along the sea.

== Sorrento, legends and myths ==
The myth of the Sirens has been loosely associated with Sorrento since antiquity. Three mermaids settled at li galli islands near Punta Campanella enchanting the seafarers sailing through those waters.

== The beach of Queen Giovanna ==
A beach near to Sorrento natural swimming pool near the summer residence of the homonymous ruler. It is said that Queen Giovanna d'Angiò spent her summer holidays pleasantly in Sorrento. Having many lovers, she indulged them right on this beach. After taking advantage of them she had them drowned by her soldiers.

== Rites of Holy week ==
The two main processions that take place in Sorrento on Good Friday are the Procession of Our Lady of Sorrows (or the "Visit in the Sepulchres"), organised by the Venerable Arciconfraternita of Saint Monica and the Procession of the Crucified Christ, organised by the Venerable Arciconfraternita of the Death.

== Geography ==
=== Climate ===
Sorrento experiences a Mediterranean climate (Köppen climate classification Csa). with mild, wet winters and warm, dry summers. The mild climate and fertility of the Gulf of Naples made the region famous during Roman times, when emperors such as Claudius and Tiberius holidayed nearby. Temperatures can get as high as 29 °C (84 °F) in April, as happened in 2013.

Climate data for Sorrento
Month	Jan	Feb	Mar	Apr	May	Jun	Jul	Aug	Sep	Oct	Nov	Dec	Year
Mean daily maximum °C (°F)	12.5 (54.5)	13.2 (55.8)	15.2 (59.4)	18.2 (64.8)	22.6 (72.7)	26.2 (79.2)	29.3 (84.7)	29.5 (85.1)	26.3 (79.3)	21.8 (71.2)	17.0 (62.6)	13.6 (56.5)	20.4 (68.8)
Daily mean °C (°F)	8.2 (46.7)	8.8 (47.8)	10.6 (51.0)	13.3 (55.9)	17.4 (63.3)	20.9 (69.7)	23.7 (74.6)	23.7 (74.7)	20.8 (69.4)	16.7 (62.1)	12.4 (54.3)	9.4 (48.9)	15.5 (59.9)
Mean daily minimum °C (°F)	3.8 (38.8)	4.3 (39.7)	5.9 (42.6)	8.3 (46.9)	12.1 (53.8)	15.6 (60.1)	18.0 (64.4)	17.9 (64.2)	15.3 (59.5)	11.6 (52.9)	7.7 (45.9)	5.1 (41.2)	10.4 (50.8)
Average precipitation mm (inches)	100 (4.1)	99 (3.9)	86 (3.4)	76 (3.0)	51 (2.0)	33 (1.3)	25 (1.0)	41 (1.6)	81 (3.2)	130 (5.1)	160 (6.4)	120 (4.8)	1,010 (39.8)

== Demographics ==
Historical population

Year	Pop.	±%
1861	6,720	—
1871	7,318	+8.9%
1881	7,896	+7.9%
1901	8,832	+11.9%
1911	10,070	+14.0%
1921	10,075	+0.0%
1931	9,720	−3.5%
1936	9,898	+1.8%

Year	Pop.	±%
1951	10,822	+9.3%
1961	11,768	+8.7%
1971	15,040	+27.8%
1981	17,318	+15.1%
1991	16,459	−5.0%
2001	16,536	+0.5%
2011	16,563	+0.2%
2021	15,600	−5.8%

Source: ISTAT

== Culture ==
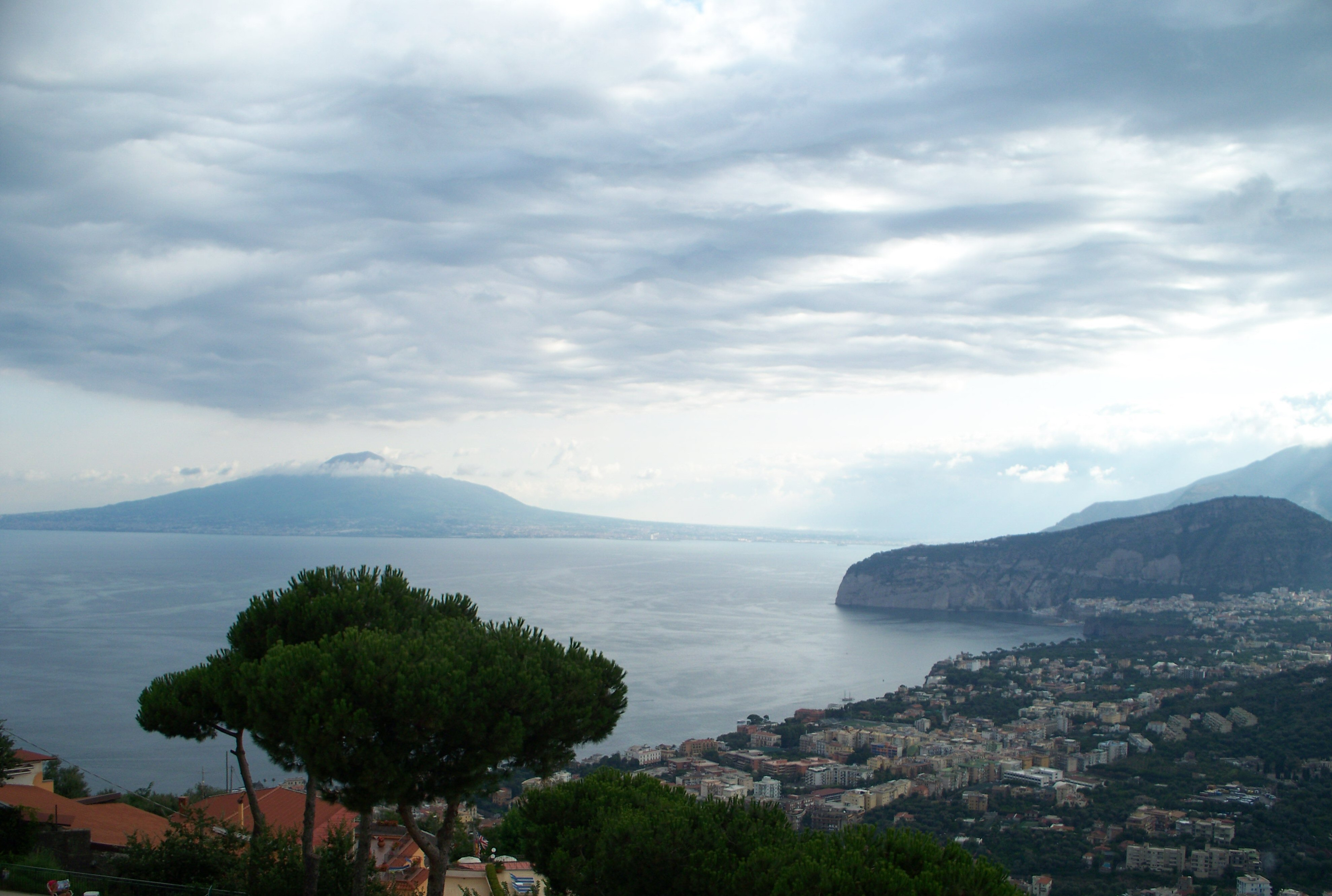
View of Vesuvius from Sorrento

Sorrento has been visited by Lord Byron, John Keats, Johann Wolfgang von Goethe, Charles Dickens, Richard Wagner, Henrik Ibsen, and Friedrich Nietzsche. Sorrento was the birthplace of the poet Torquato Tasso, author of the Gerusalemme Liberata. The town was featured in the early 20th century song "Torna a Surriento" (Come Back to Sorrento) with lyrics by Giambattista De Curtis, brother of the song's composer, Ernesto De Curtis.

In the 1920s, famous Soviet writer Maxim Gorky lived in Sorrento.

Songs that have featured Surrento prominently have included "Torna a Surriento" and "Caruso", a song composed in Sorrento, in the summer of 1985, by the Bolognese singer-songwriter Lucio Dalla, whose fifty-years ties with Sorrento are described in the novel by the Sorrentine writer, Raffaele Lauro, titled "Caruso The Song - Lucio Dalla and Sorrento", which was released in December 2014.

The local football team is Football Club Sorrento that plays at the Stadio Italia, and currently plays in the Eccellenza Campania of the Italian Football League.

== Main sights ==
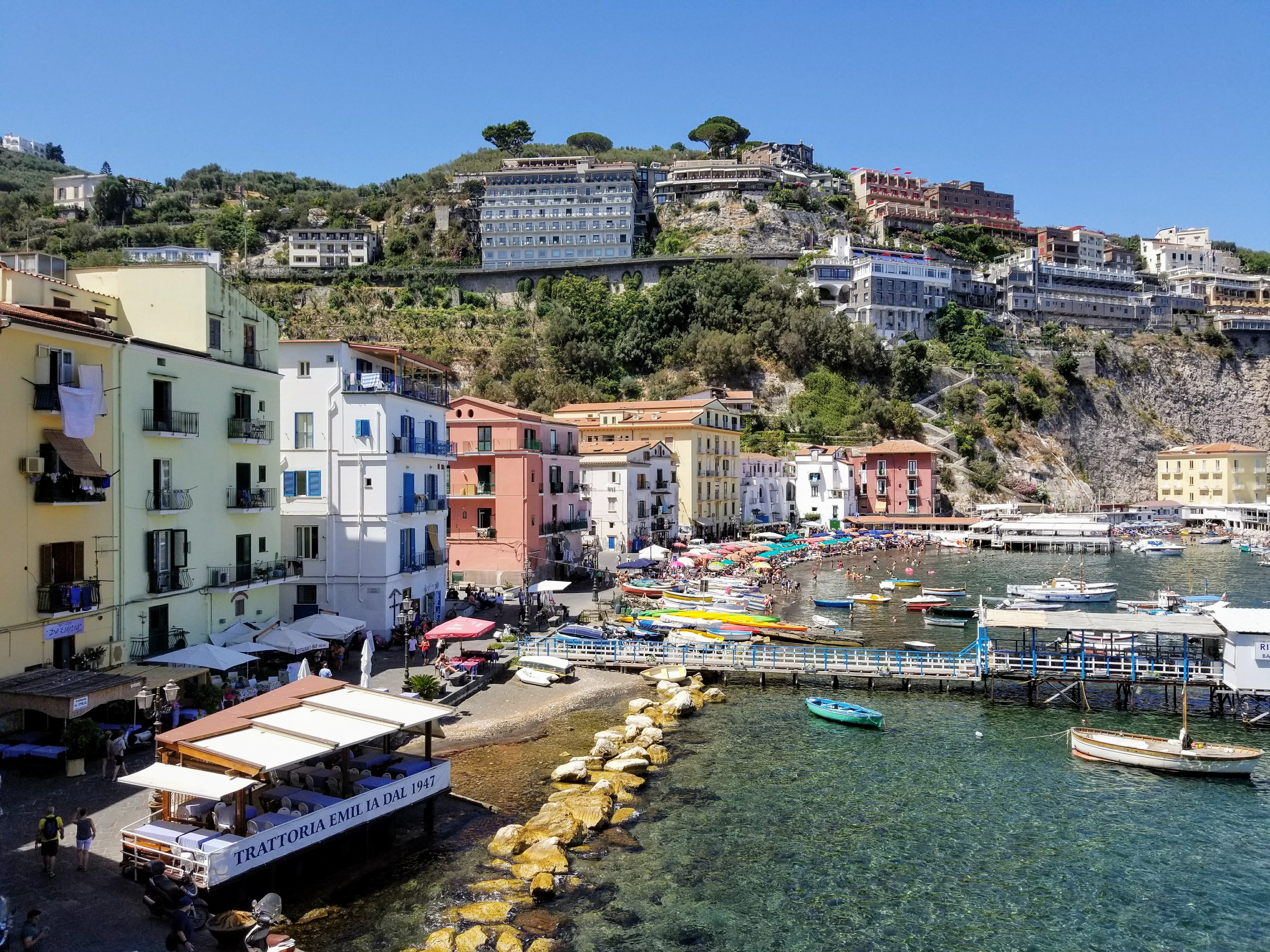
Marina Grande, Sorrento

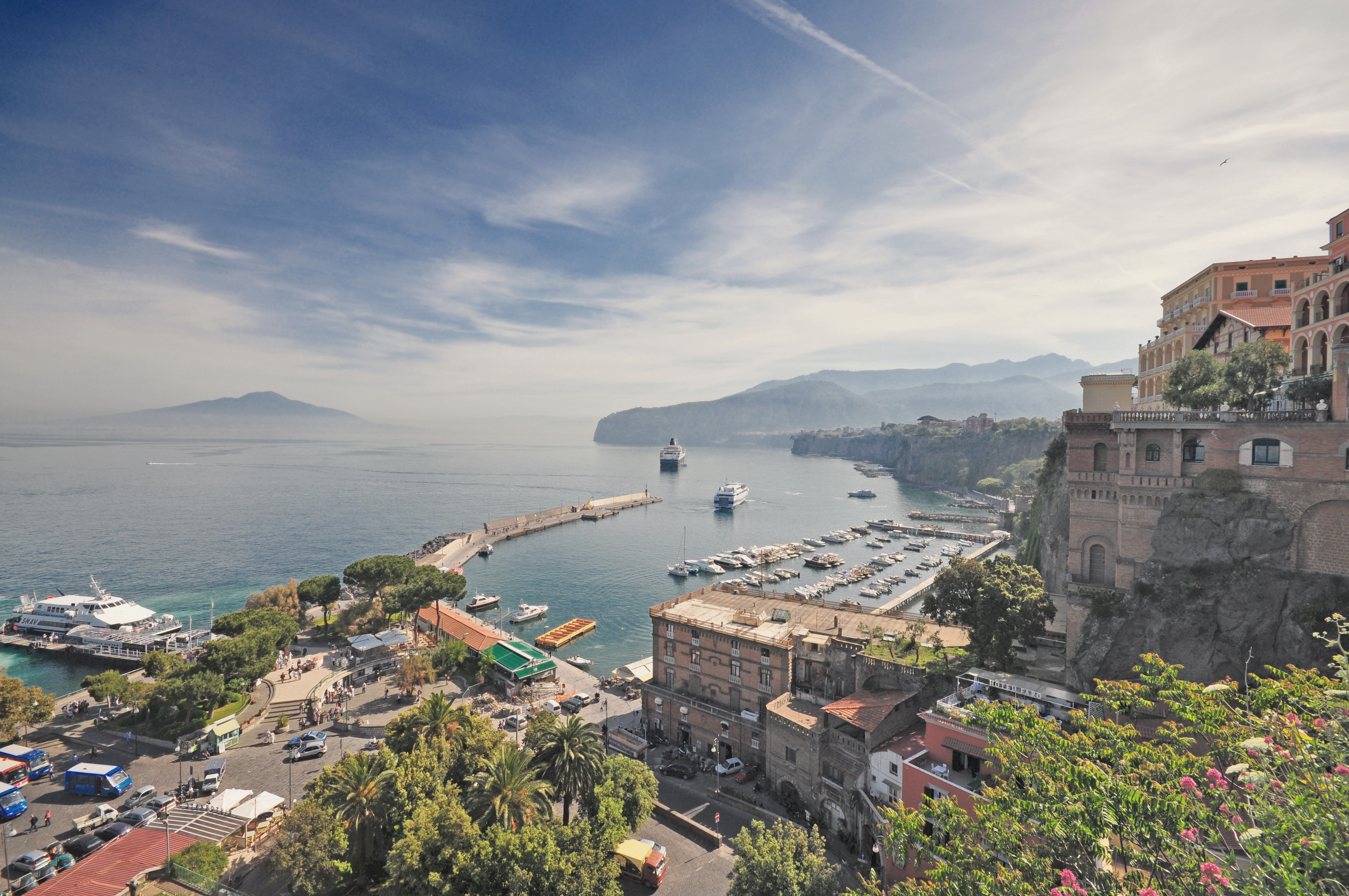
Marina Piccola, Sorrento

- Amalfi Coast
- Marina Grande, port of Sorrento
- Marina Piccola, small port of Sorrento
- Park of Villa communale with a view of the Gulf of Naples with the volcano Vesuvius
- Piazza Tasso, central place in Sorrento
- Sorrento funicular (1883–1886), remnants of the defunct inclined railway descending from Hotel Vittoria
- Museo della tarsia lignea (intarsia)
- Museum Correale (Museo Correale di Terranova), museum with small archeologic department
- Via San Cesareo, Sorrento's main shopping street
- Cathedral of Sorrento (Santi Filippo e Giacomo Cathedral), from the 14th century with façade reconstructed in 1924. It was built over time in different styles, with doors of the 11th century from Constantinople
- Church of Santi Felice e Baccolo
- Monastery of St Francesco, 14th century
- Roman ruins at the Punta del Capo
- Vallone dei Mulini (Valley of the Mills), see Vallone dei Mulini at Wikipedia Italiano

== Transportation ==
Sorrento is served by ferry or hydrofoil from Naples or Capri as well as by boat services from the ports of the Bay of Naples and the Sorrentine Peninsula. Naples is served by two ports, Mergellina and Molo Beverello. Sorrento is connected to Naples by the Circumvesuviana rail line. Friends of Sorrento has details of buses serving Sorrento.

=== Airports ===
The nearest airports are:

- Napoli-Capodichino (NAP) 53 km
- Salerno-Pontecagnano (QSR) 75 km

== Notable people ==
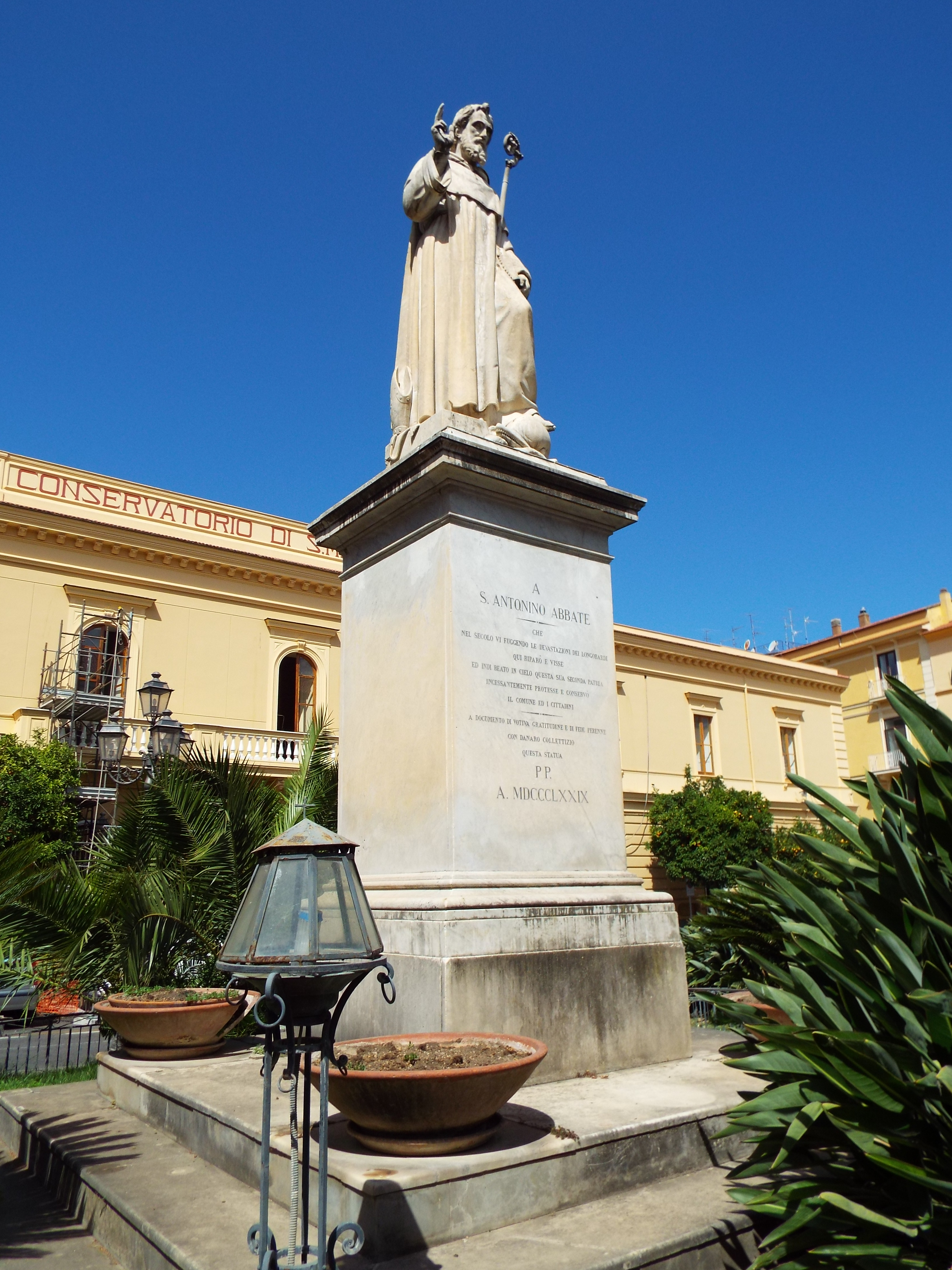
Statue of St Antoninus of Sorrento

- Antoninus of Sorrento (555 or 556 – 625), an Italian abbot, hermit and saint
- Saint Baculus of Sorrento (7th c.), venerated as a Bishop of Sorrento
- Nardo Mormile (died 1493), a Roman Catholic prelate, Archbishop of Sorrento 1480–1493
- Antonius Agellius (1532 in Sorrento – 1608), Bishop of Acerno and a member of the Theatines
- Torquato Tasso (1544–1595), Italian poet of the 16th century
- Giuseppe Agellio (1570 in Sorrento – after 1620), an Italian painter of the Baroque period
- Giacomo di Castro (c. 1597 in Sorrento – 1687), an Italian painter of the Baroque period
- Sylvester Shchedrin (1791 – 1830 in Sorrento), a Russian landscape painter, emigrated to Italy in 1818
- Edoardo De Martino CVO (1838 Meta di Sorrento – 1912), an Italian-British painter, mainly active in London, painted warships and marine battles
- Bonaventura Gargiulo (1843–1904), Italian Capuchin friar, editor and publisher and Bishop of the Roman Catholic Diocese of San Severo
- Friedrich Nietzsche (1844–1900), the German philosopher, was in Sorrento for six months in 1876. He there wrote Human, All Too Human
- Maxim Gorky (1868–1936), a Russian and Soviet writer, a founder of the socialist realism literary method and a political activist, five-time nominee for the Nobel Prize in Literature. Lived in Sorrento during his second exile from 1921 to 1928
- Aniello Califano (1870 in Sorrento – 1919), an Italian poet and writer, author of Neapolitan songs
- Pasquale Troise (1895, in Minori village – 1957), mandolinist and bandleader, active in England from the 1920s.
- Enrico Garff (born 1939), an Italian portrait painter and colourist, he has worked in Positano, Sorrento, Rome, Sicily and in Sweden and Finland
- Raffaele Lauro (born 1944 in Sorrento), politician and writer

== Twin towns – sister cities ==
Sorrento is twinned with:

- Dubrovnik, Croatia
- Kumano, Japan
- Mar del Plata, Argentina
- Nice, France
- San Martino Valle Caudina, Italy
- Santa Fe, United States
- Skien, Norway
- Taurasi, Italy
- Sorrento, Australia

== See also ==
- Amalfi Coast
- Sorrentine Peninsula
- Torna a Surriento

== Other sources ==
- "Sorrento" . Encyclopædia Britannica. Vol. 25 (11th ed.). 1911.
- Sorrento travel guide from Wikivoyage
- Media related to Sorrento at Wikimedia Commons
