= Piazza Tasso, Sorrento =

Square in Sorrento, Campania, Italy

Coordinates: 40°37′34.7″N 14°22′33.6″E

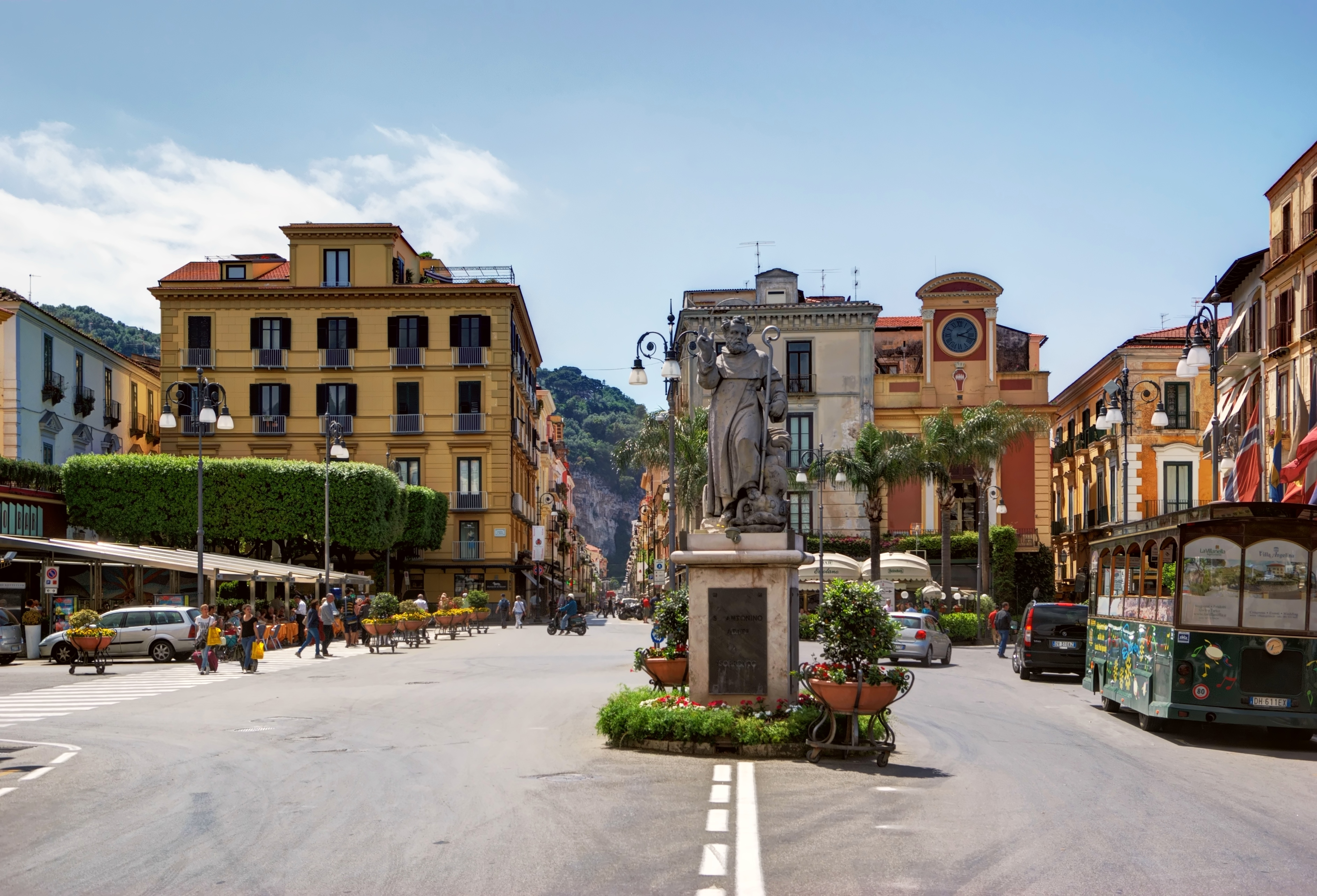
Piazza Tasso

Piazza Tasso is a central place and square in Sorrento in the south of Italy. The square is named after the poet Torquato Tasso (1544–1595).

In the main square, well known as Largo of the Caste, is the yellow-painted Baroque Carmelite Church del Carmine, holding within its interior a painting by Onofrio Avellino of the Virgin Mary with Saint Simon Stock and angels. On the square stands a statue of Saint Antoninus of Sorrento. The shopping street Via San Cesareo leads off the square to the west.

Also near Piazza Tasso is the Palazzo Correale, now also a museum, Museum Correale.
