= Vallone dei Mulini =

Valley in Sorrento, Italy

Coordinates: 40.6251°N 14.3763°E

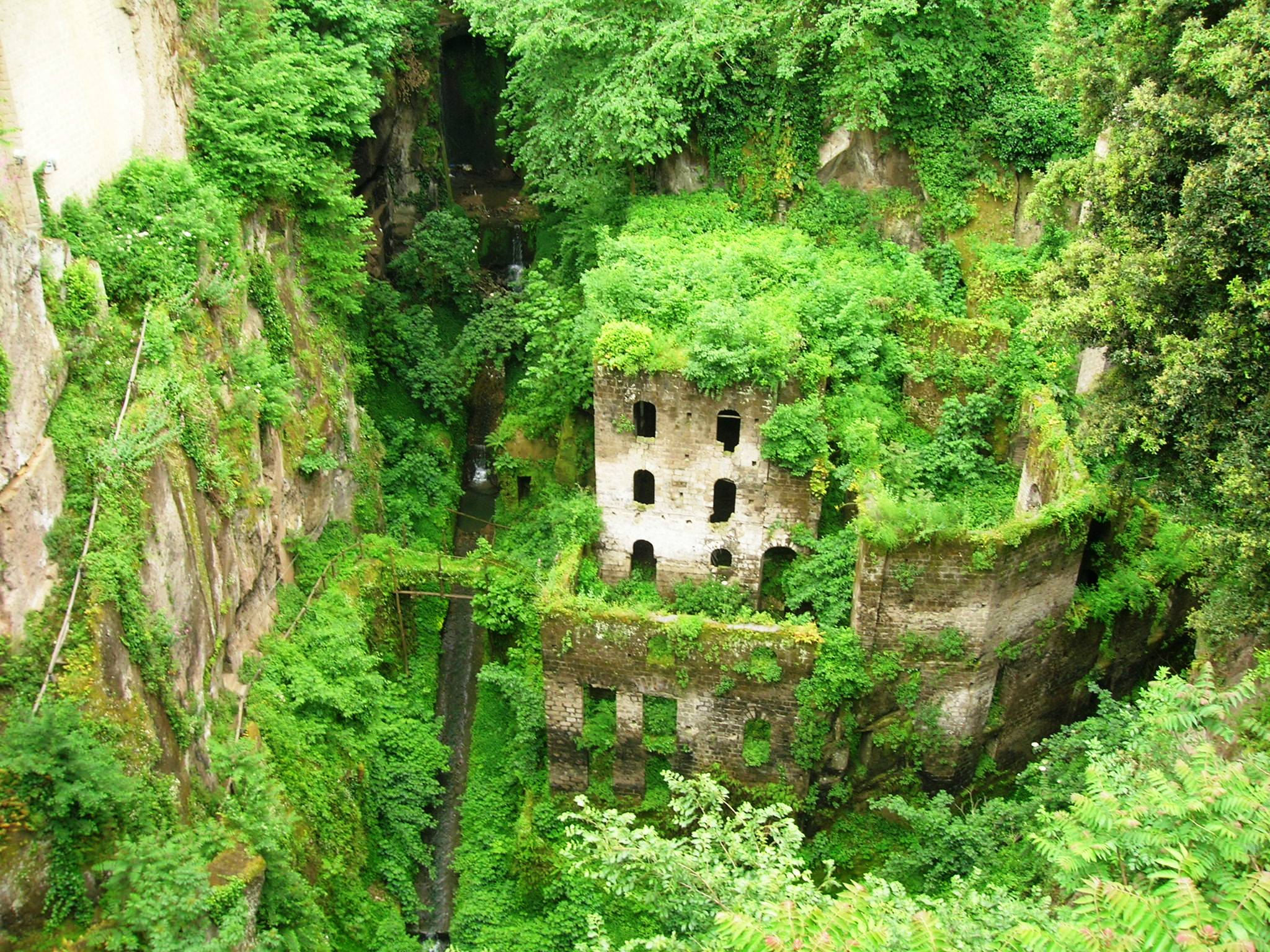

Geology
- Age: About 37,000 years old

Geography
- Location: Sorrento, Italy
- Interactive map of Vallone dei Mulini

Vallone dei Mulini or Valle dei Mulini (known in English as Valley of the Mills) is a historic valley in Sorrento, Italy.

== History ==
The historic flour mills, built from stone as far back as the 13th century. Its name derived from its beginning function: to grind grain. The valley originates from the release of waters into a tufa plain about 37,000 years ago, following the eruption of the Campi Flegrei.

A sawmill was providing sawn wood. It was in operation until the beginning of the tenth century. In 1866, Piazza Tasso was established, and it caused the mill and the surrounding sea to be isolated. The building was closed and abandoned in the 1940s.

== Geography ==
It is located behind Piazza Tasso. The valley is carved by two rivers: Casarlano-Cesarano and S. Antonino. This also means that the humidity is very high.

== Characteristics ==
It is considered one of the most enchanting views of the Sorrento Peninsula. It is known for its variety and unique plants. These plants settle within ferns. Possible reasons for the appearance of these rare plants include moisture in the area, nearly complete lack of ventilation, sun exposure, and the presence of tuff.

== Gallery ==
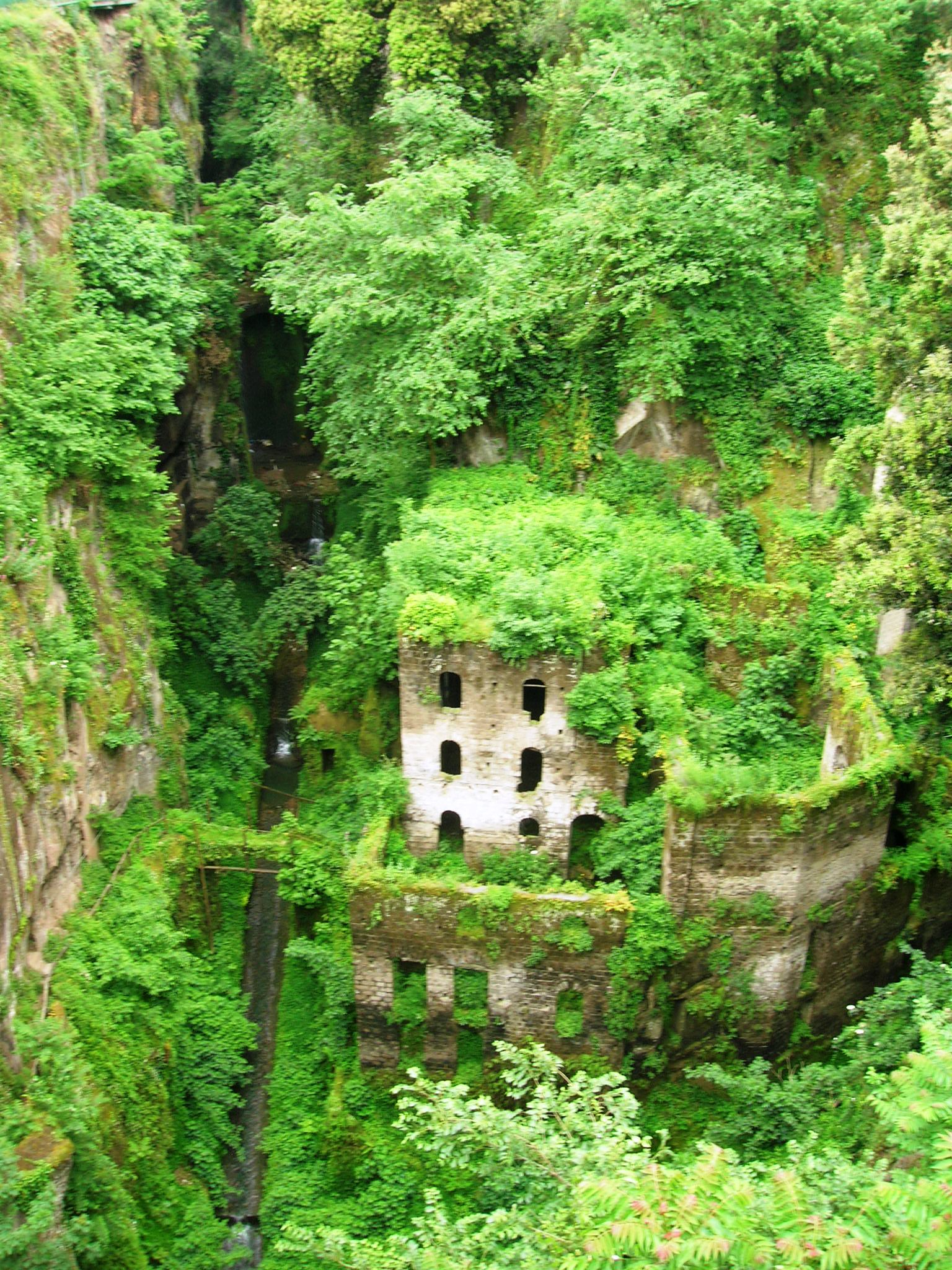

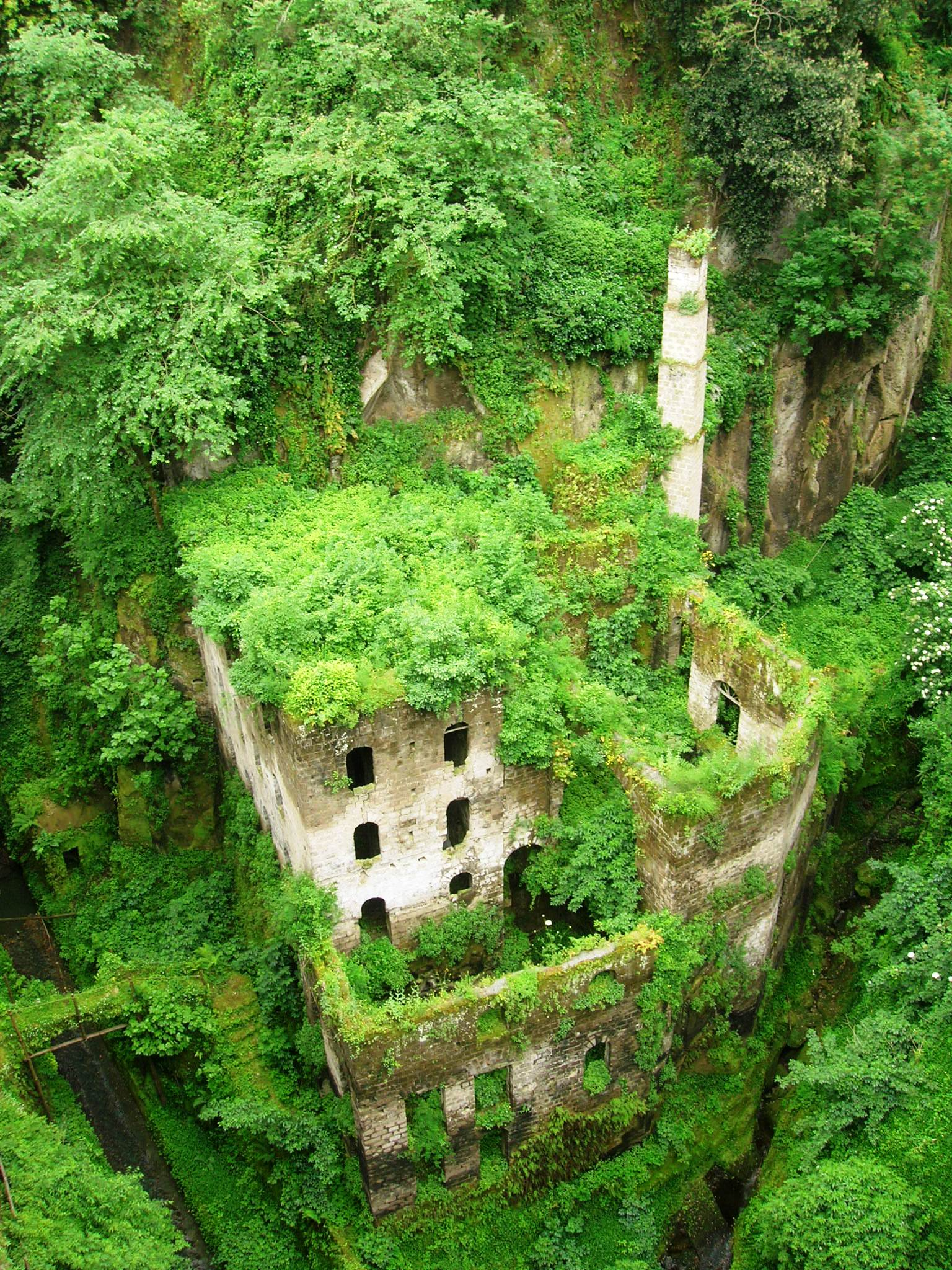
