= Vallelonga (surname) =

Vallelonga is a surname. Notable people with the surname include:

- Frank Vallelonga, Sr. (a.k.a. Tony Lip; 1930–2013), American actor and author; father of Nick Vallelonga
- Nick Vallelonga (born 1959), American actor, screenwriter, producer, and film director; son of Tony Lip
- Tony Vallelonga (born 1946), Italian-born Australian property developer and mayor
- Vincenzo Vallelonga (born ?), Australian track and field athlete and Paralympics medalist
