= Antoninus of Sorrento =

Italian abbot, hermit and saint

Saint Antoninus of Sorrento
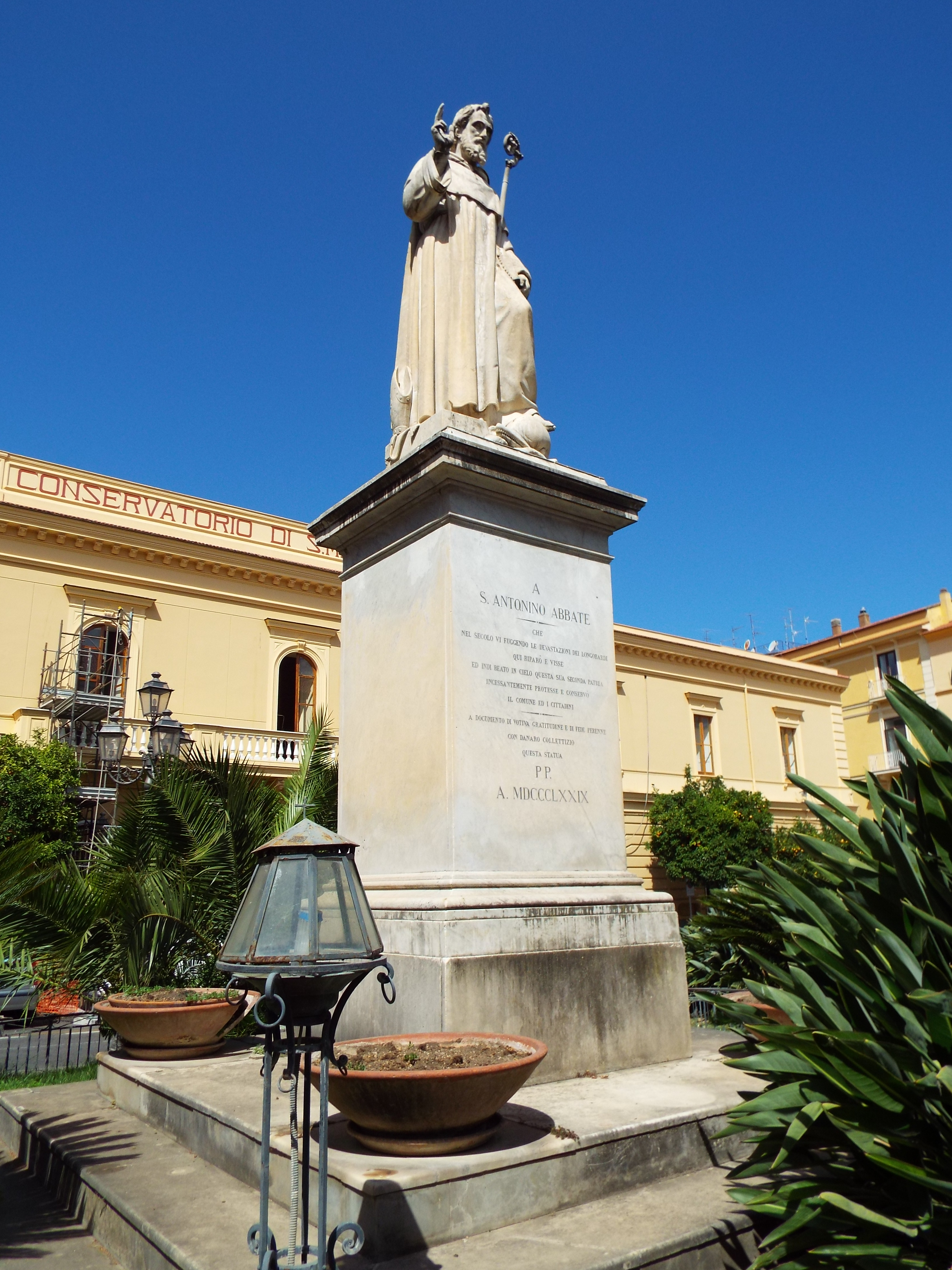

Abbot
- Born: 555 or 556; Campagna
- Died: 625; Sorrento
- Venerated in: Catholic Church; Eastern Orthodox Church
- Feast: 14 February
- Attributes: Depicted as a Benedictine holding a standard and the city wall
- Patronage: Campagna, Sorrento

Antoninus of Sorrento (died 625) was an Italian abbot, hermit, and saint.

Born at Campagna, he left his native town to become a monk at Monte Cassino. During that time, Italy was suffering from barbarian invasions and Antoninus was forced to leave this monastery. Monte Cassino had been plundered by the Lombards and the monks escaped to Rome to seek protection from Pope Pelagius II. Antoninus, however, headed for Campania where he ended up at Castellammare di Stabia. Here Saint Catellus (San Catello) was bishop. Catellus, wishing to become a hermit, gave up his office as bishop and entrusted Antoninus with the task of serving as the town's bishop. Catellus withdrew to Monte Aureo.

The desire to remain a hermit himself led Antoninus to convince Catellus to return to his see. Antoninus retired to Monte Aureo himself and lived in a natural grotto. However, Catellus again decided to withdraw to this mountain and dedicate himself only sporadically to the cares of his diocese.

An apparition of Saint Michael is said to have convinced the two to construct the stone church now known as Monte San Angelo or Punta San Michele.

Subsequently, Catellus was accused of witchcraft by a priest named Tibeius (Tibeio) of Stabia and was held captive at Rome until a new pope released him. Catellus returned to Stabia and dedicated himself to expanding the church that he had helped found.

Inhabitants of Sorrento, meanwhile, convinced Antoninus to settle at Sorrento. Antoninus became an abbot of the Benedictine monastery of San Agrippino, succeeding Boniface (Bonifacio) in this capacity.

== Veneration ==
A miracle attributed to Saint Antoninus states that he saved a young child from a whale after it had been swallowed up by this sea creature. The sorrentini erected a crypt and basilica in honor of Antoninus. He was credited with saving the city from many dangers: a Moorish naval invasion; the revolt of the Sorrento leader Giovanni Grillo against Spanish domination; demonic possession; bubonic plague; and cholera.
