= Mittagstal =

Coordinates: 46°31′34″N 11°49′54″E

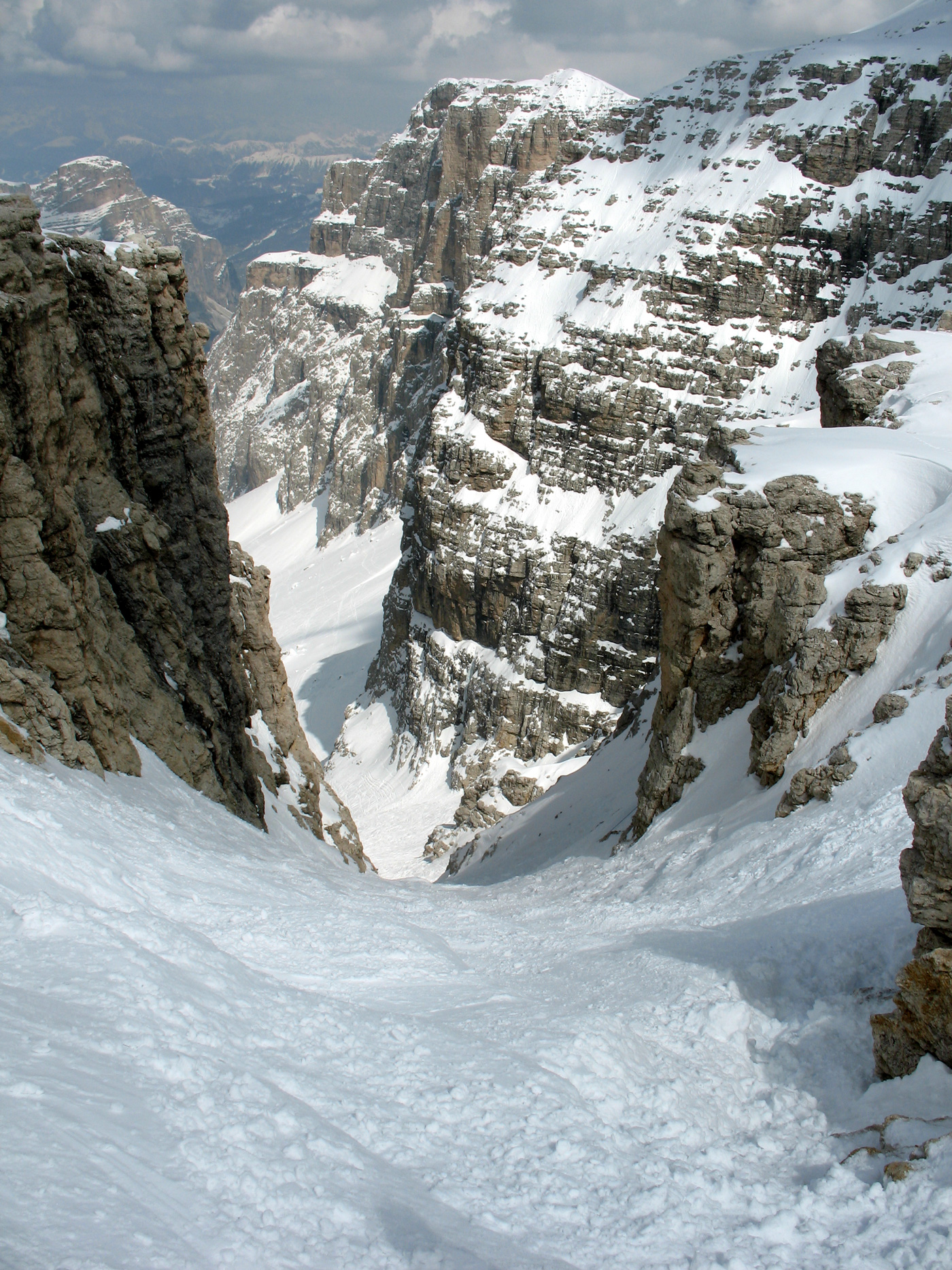
Entry to the valley in winter time

The Mittagstal (Ladin: Val de Mesdì; Italian: Val Mezdì; German: Mittagstal) is a cirque in the Sella group in South Tyrol, Italy.
