= Longa =

Longa may refer to:

== Music ==
- Longa (music), a musical note twice as long in duration as a breve, appearing primarily in Early music
- Longa (Middle Eastern music), a genre in Turkish and Arabic music

== People ==
- Francisco de Longa (1783–1842), Spanish general of the Napoleonic Wars
- Steve Longa (born 1994), American football player
- Ronal Longa (born 2004), Colombian athlete

== Places ==
- Longa, Angola, a town in Angola
- Longa River (Angola) a river in Angola
- Longa-Mavinga National Park, a national park in Angola
- Longa (Greek: Λογγά), a place in Messinia, Greece, in the municipality of Aipeia
- Longa Island, an island near Gairloch in Scotland
- Longa Stacks, small islets off the west coast of Unst, Shetland, Scotland

== Food ==
- Linga (cookie), also known as longa cookies, a sesame seed cookie from the Philippines
