= Vallelunga (South Tyrol) =

Valley in South Tyrol, Italy

Coordinates: 46.837°N 10.634°E

Vallelunga (Italian: Vallelunga, German: Langtaufers) is a valley in South Tyrol, Italy. It is a side valley of the Venosta Valley. There is a small village in the valley, also named Vallelunga. In 2002-2003 it had an adult population of 339.

Vallelunga, along with two other villages in the Venosta Valley, Stelvio and Martello, were chosen as the subject of a genetic study begun in 2002. They were chosen because they had small populations that had been isolated for centuries. The investigators believed that such populations could shed light on the etiology of diseases. The data from this study has been used in a number of research papers.
