= Austrian Federal Railways =

State-owned national railway company of Austria

- Type: Aktiengesellschaft
- Industry: Transport
- Predecessor: Erste Eisenbahnwagen-Leihgesellschaft
- Founded: 19 July 1923; 103 years ago (original); 31 March 2004; 22 years ago (current legal form)
- Headquarters: ÖBB Unternehmenszentrale, Vienna, Austria
- Area served: Central Europe
- Key people: Andreas Matthä; CEO and Chairman of the board Manuela Waldner; Head of Finance
- Products: Rail transport, Cargo transport, Services
- Operating income: ▲€6,945 million (2019)
- Net income: ▲€169 million (2019)
- Total assets: ▲€31,254 million (2019)
- Total equity: ▲€2,645 million (2019)
- Owner: Government of Austria
- Number of employees: ▲41.904 (2019)
- Divisions: ÖBB-Infrastruktur AG; ÖBB-Personenverkehr AG; Rail Cargo Austria AG
- Subsidiaries: Arverio
- Website: www.oebb.at

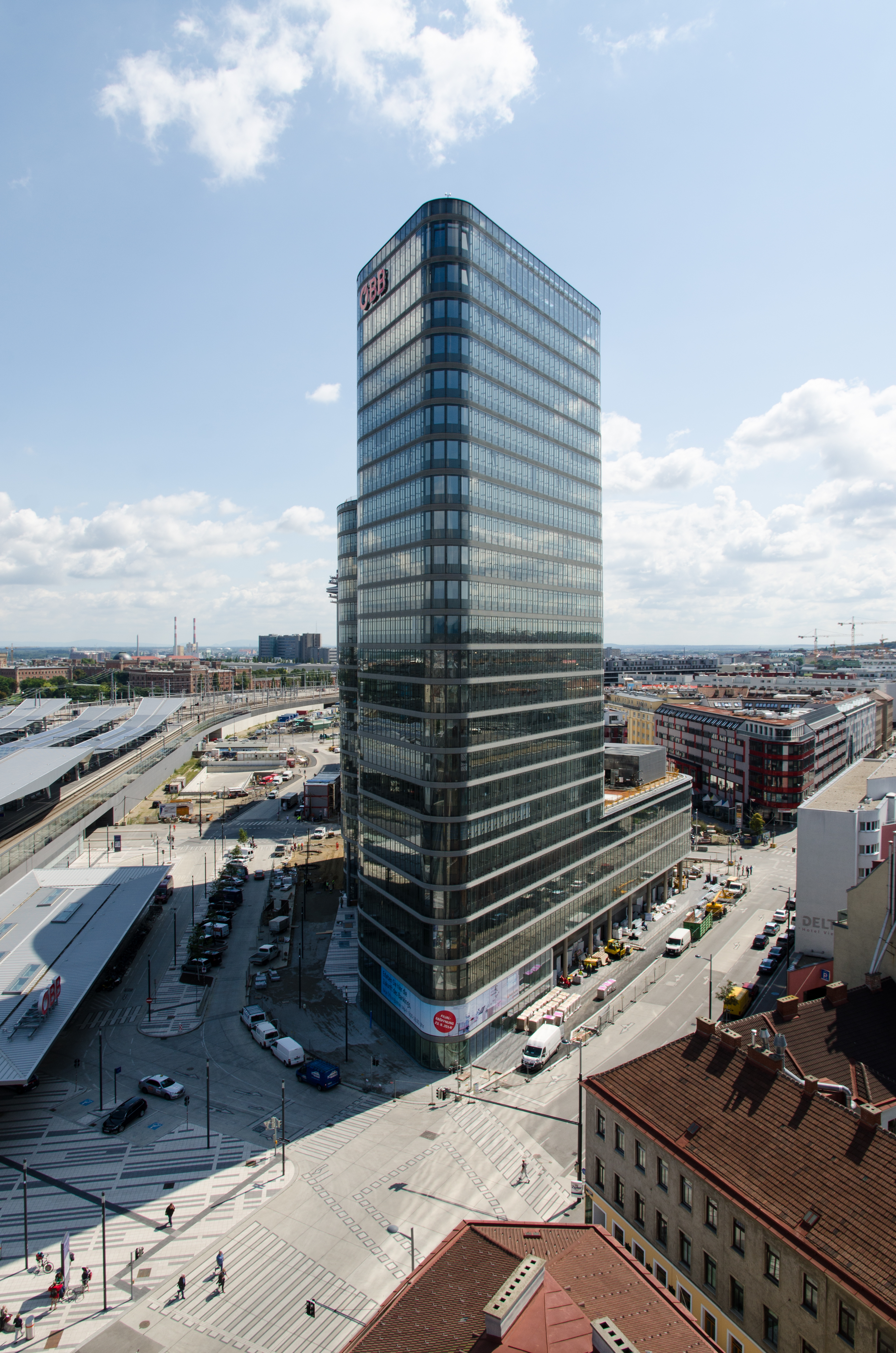
Headquarters in Vienna

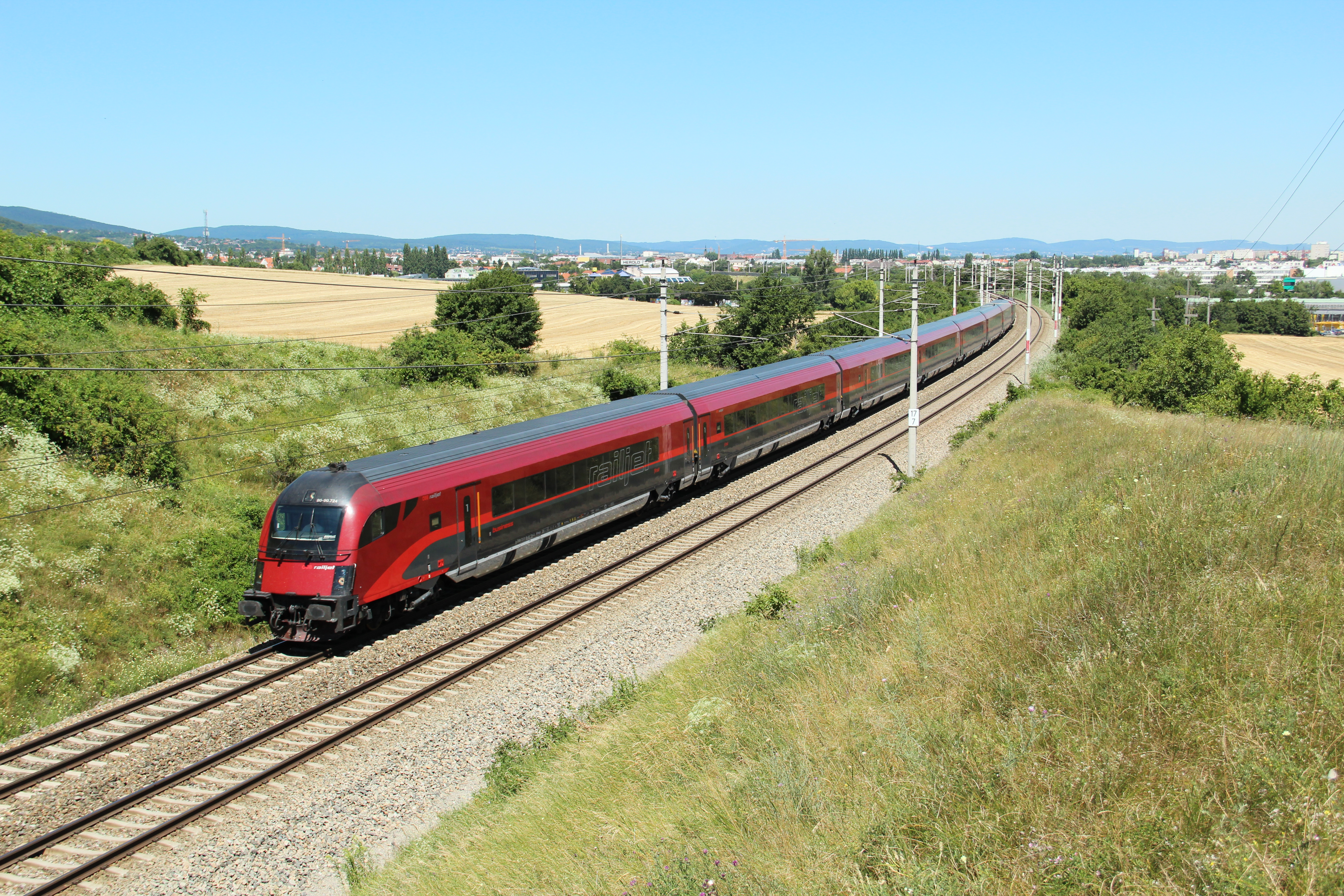
Railjet (RJ), the high-speed-train of ÖBB

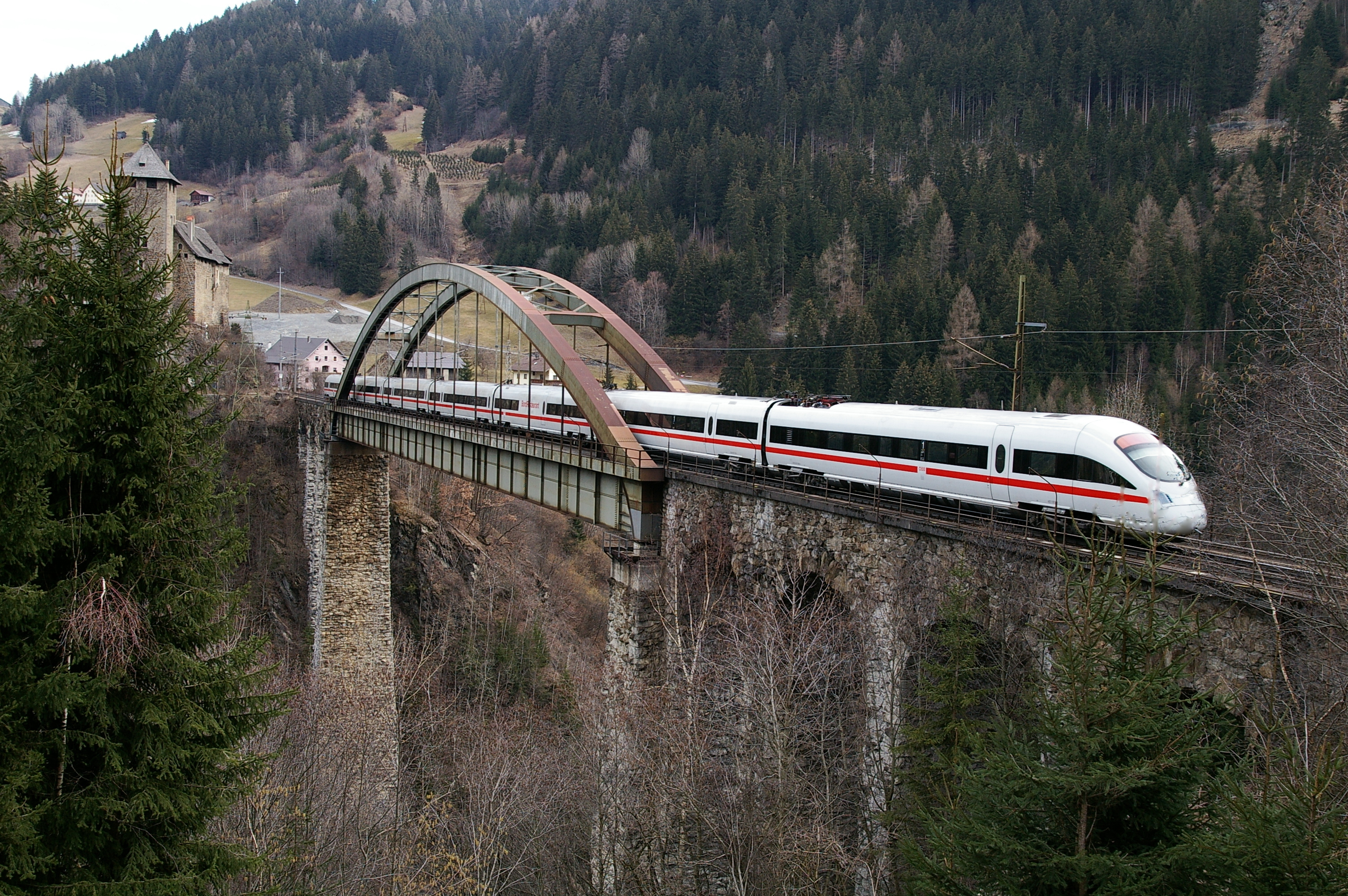
Intercity-Express (ICE)

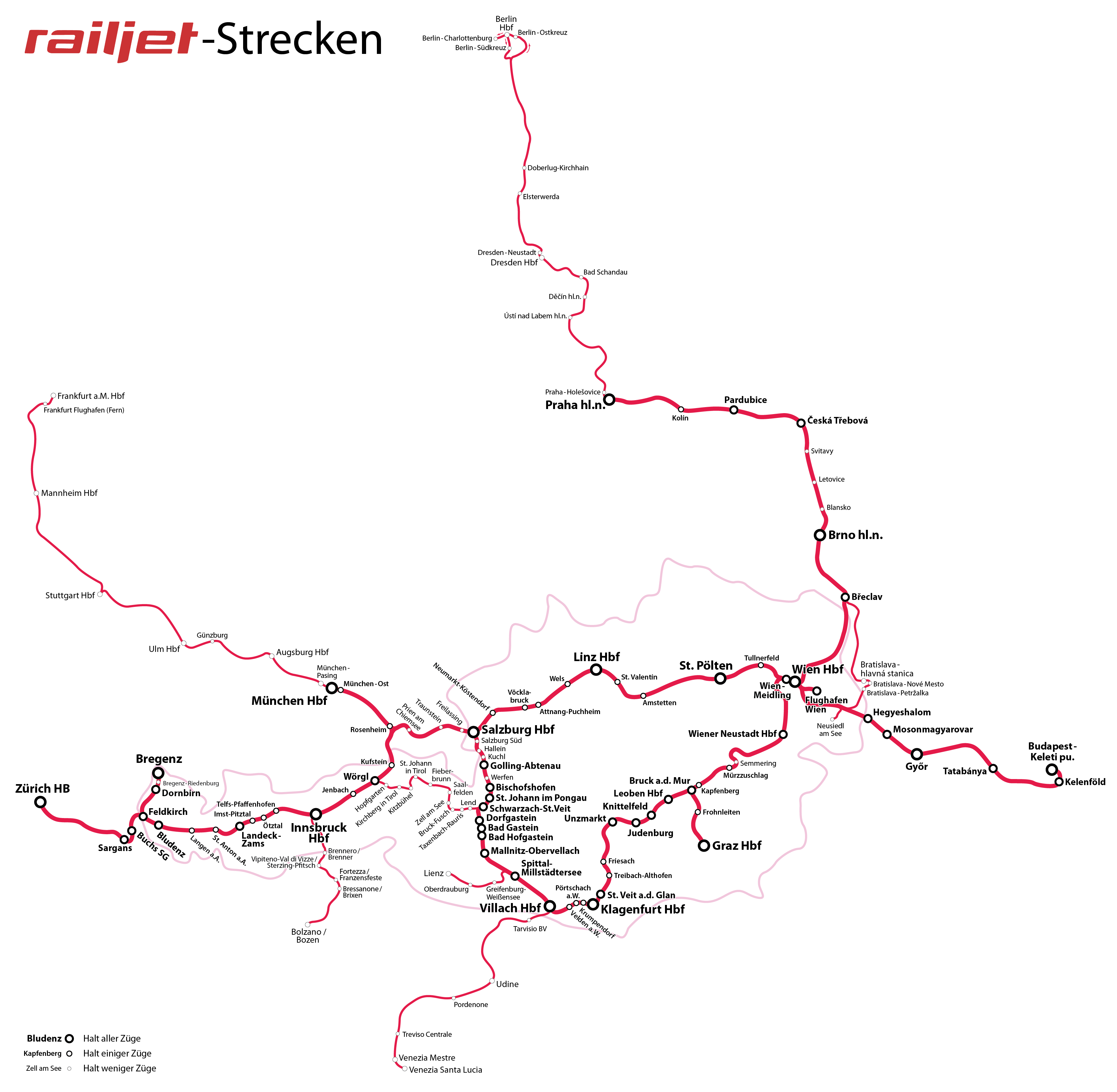
Map of the main network in Austria

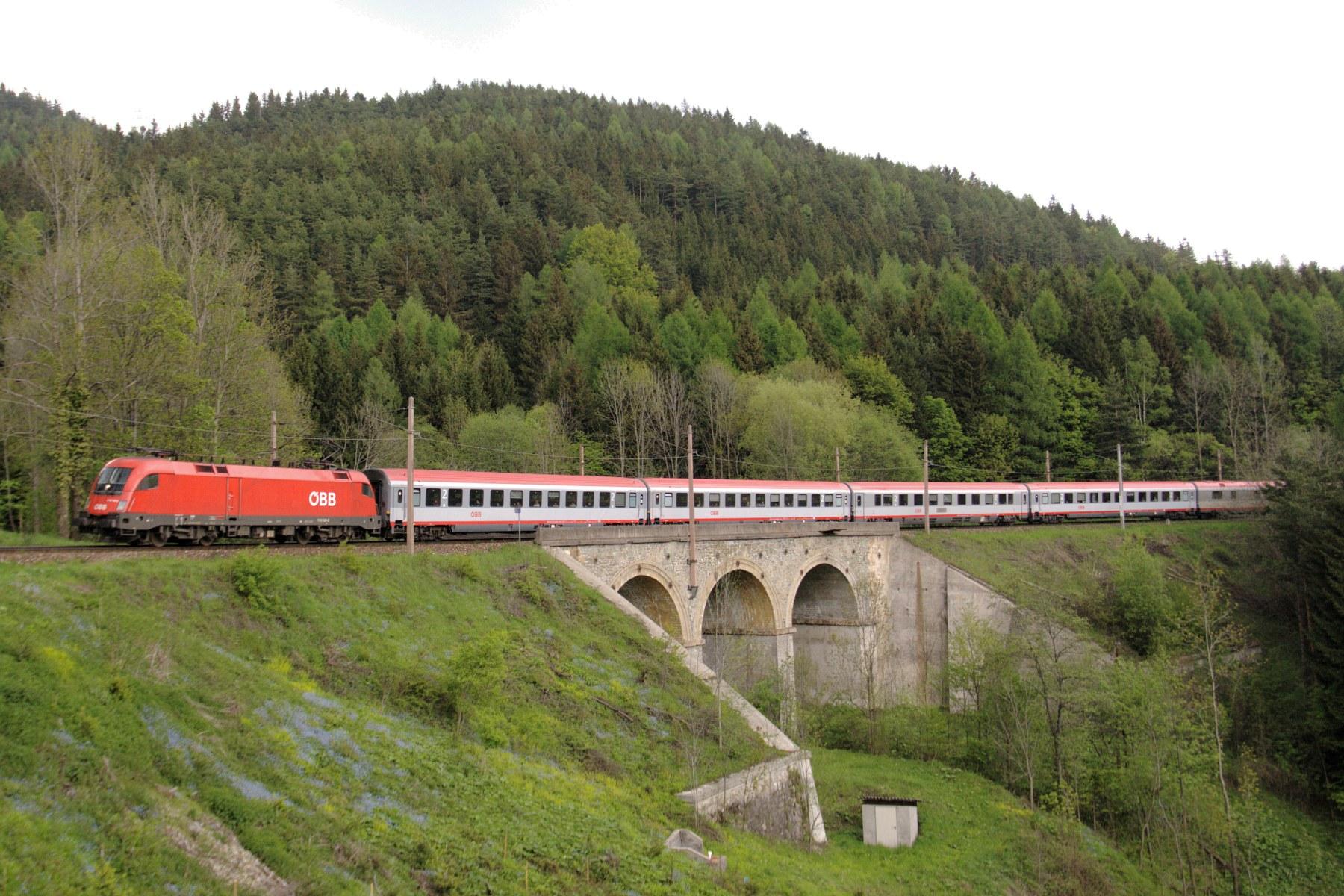
InterCity (IC) on the Semmering railway

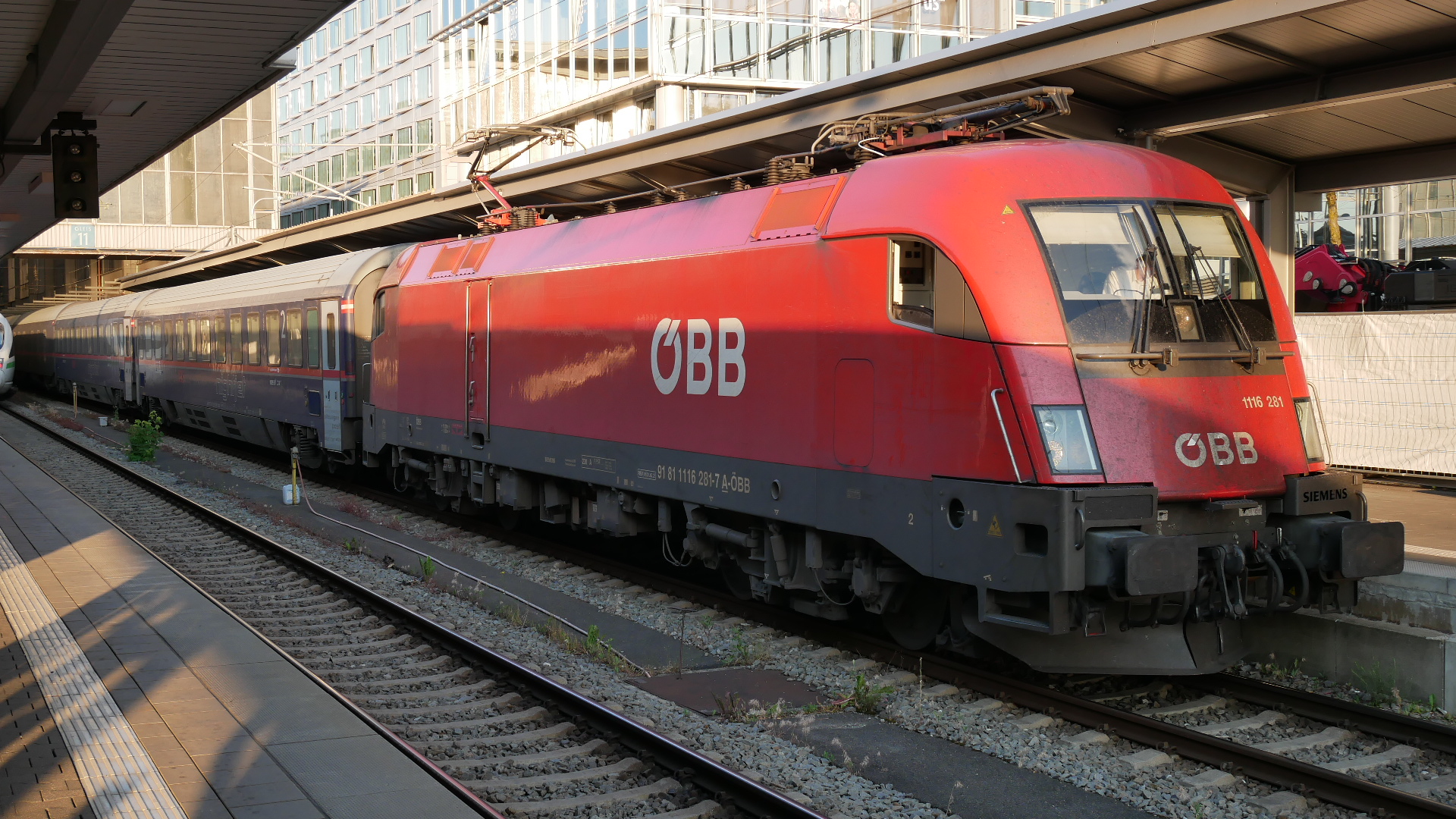
ÖBB Nightjet (NJ) train in München Hbf

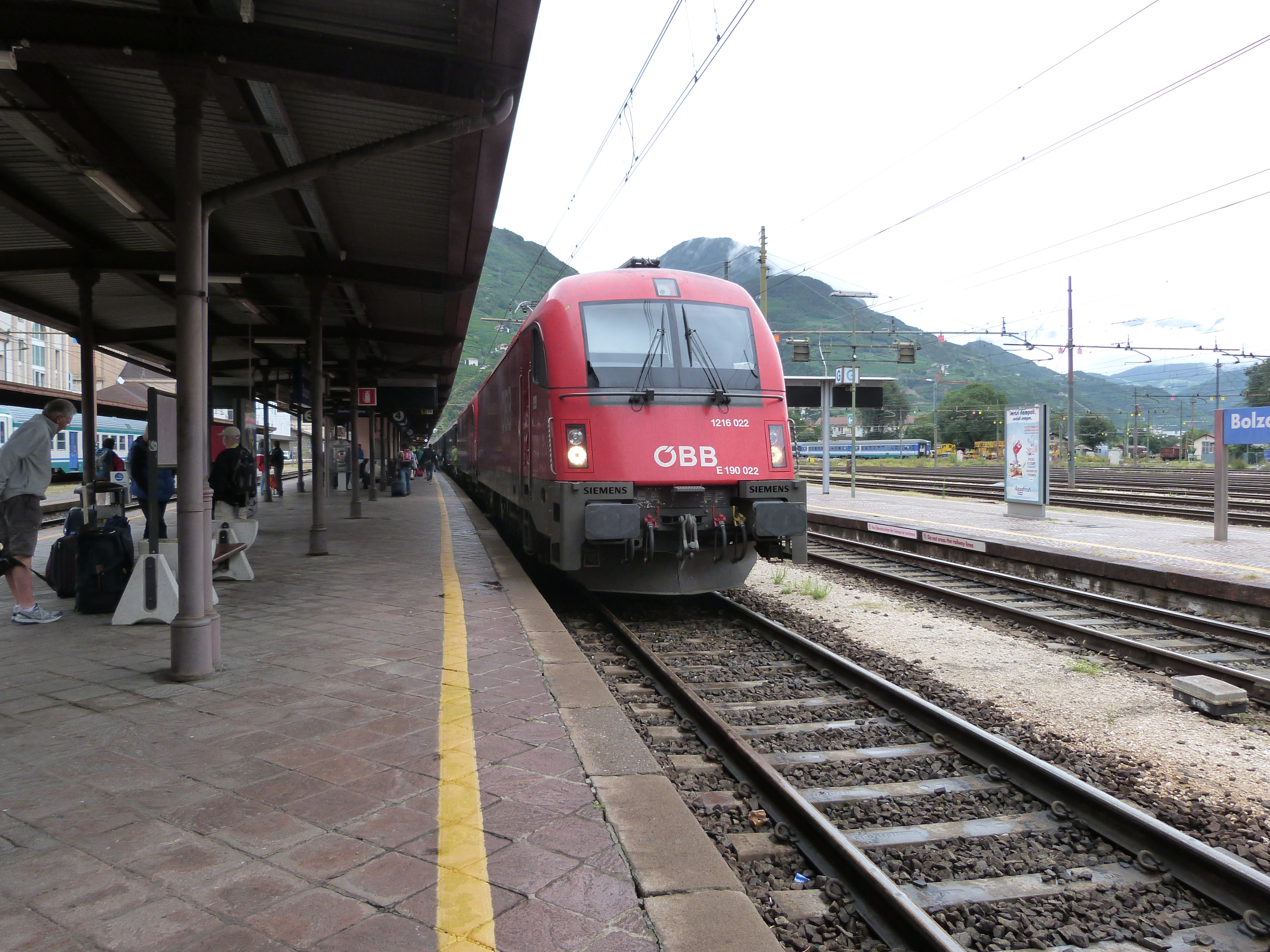
An ÖBB EuroCity (EC) train in Bolzano, South Tyrol

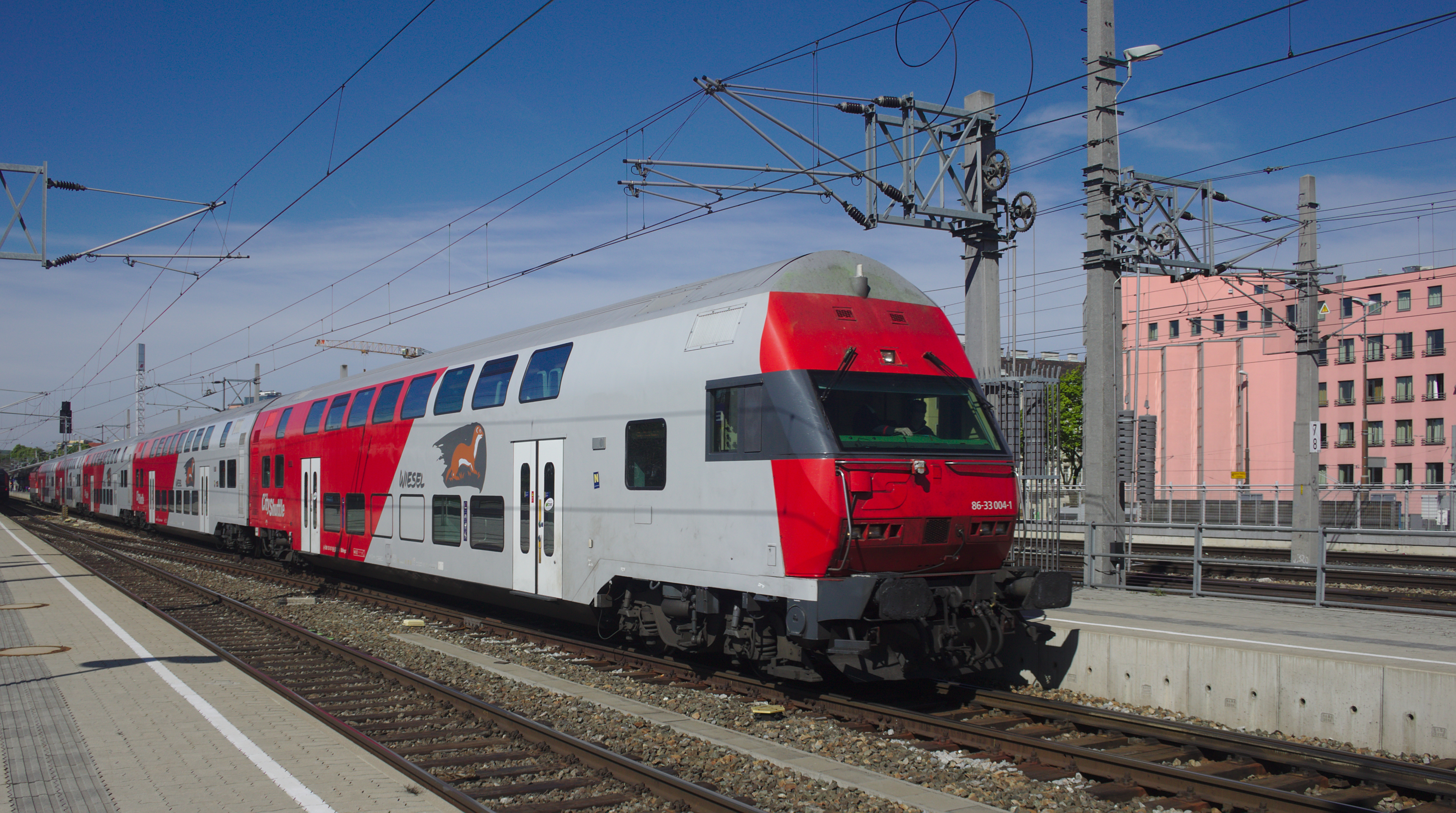
RegionalExpress train (REX) in Vienna

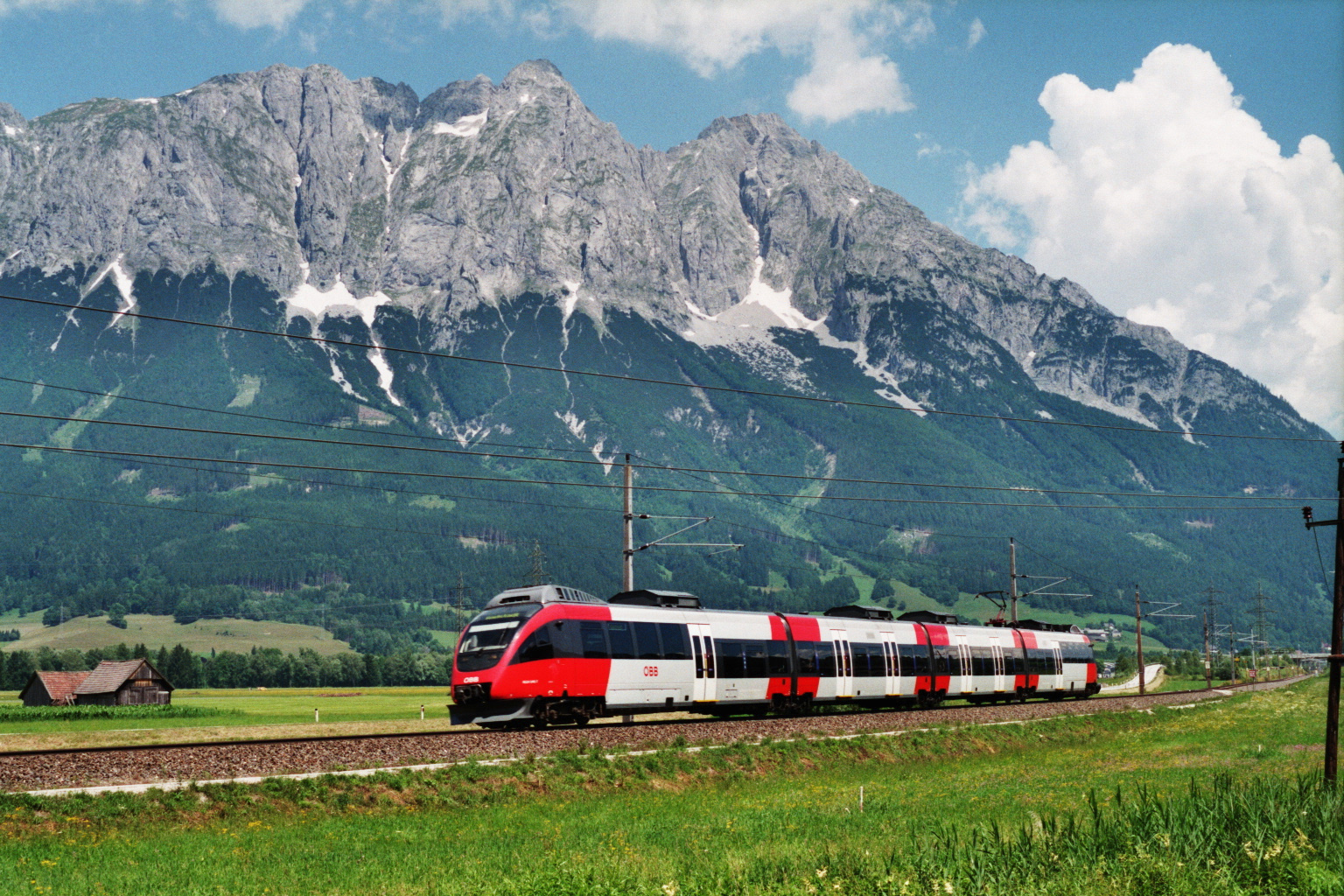
Regional train (R) in Styria

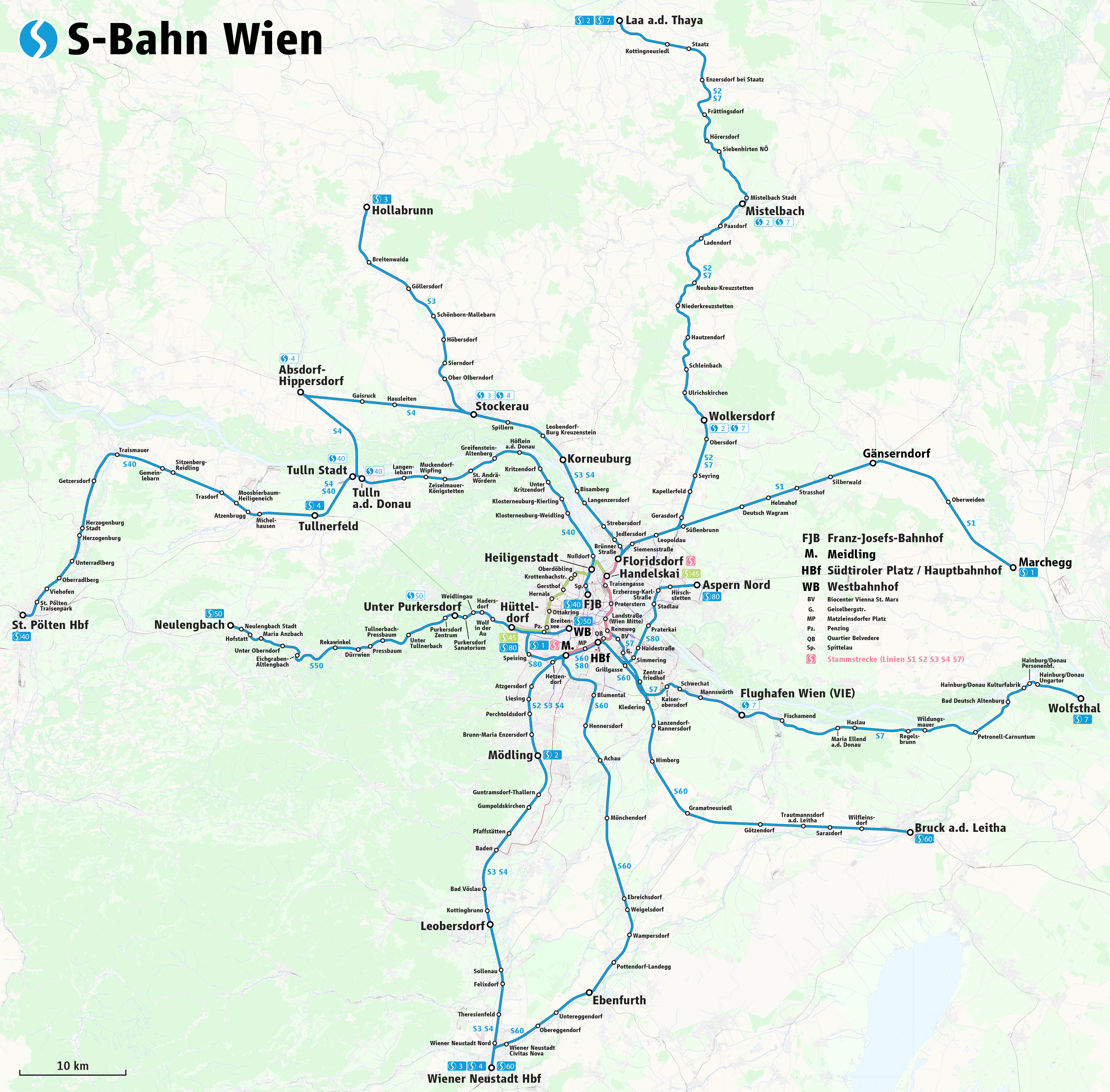
The Vienna S-Bahn is a suburban metro railway network in the Metropolitan area of Vienna

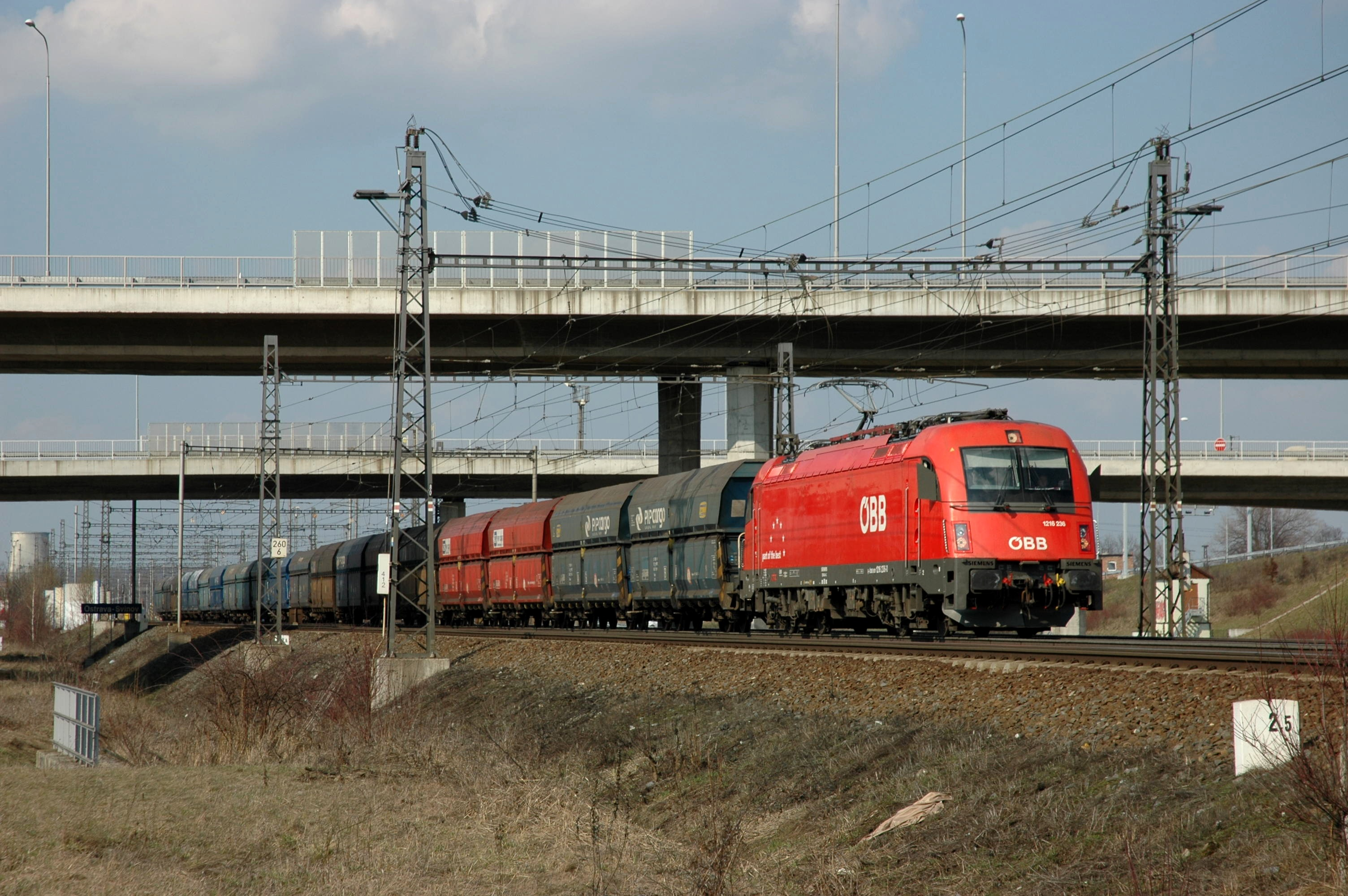
A freight train of Rail Cargo Austria

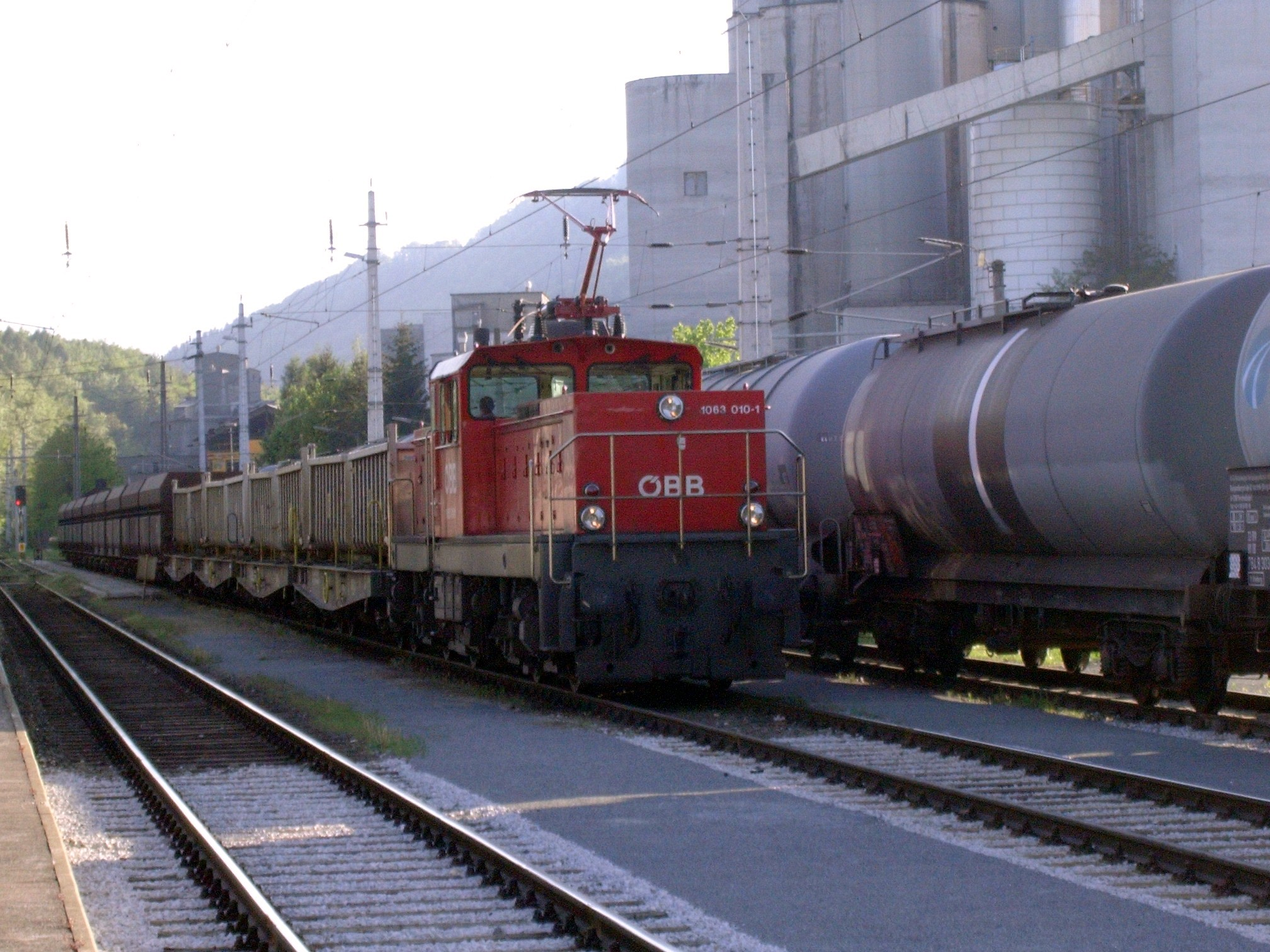
Shunting locomotive in Upper Austria

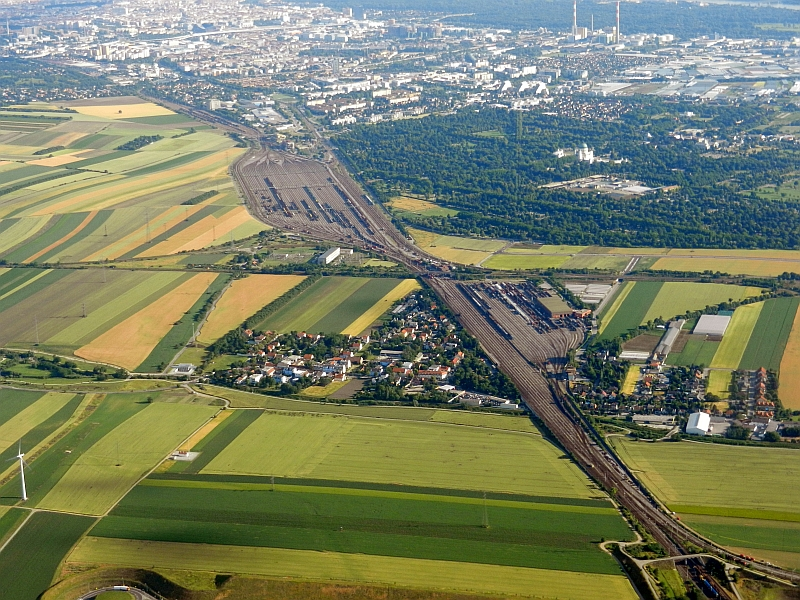
The ÖBB runs 9 classification yards in Austria

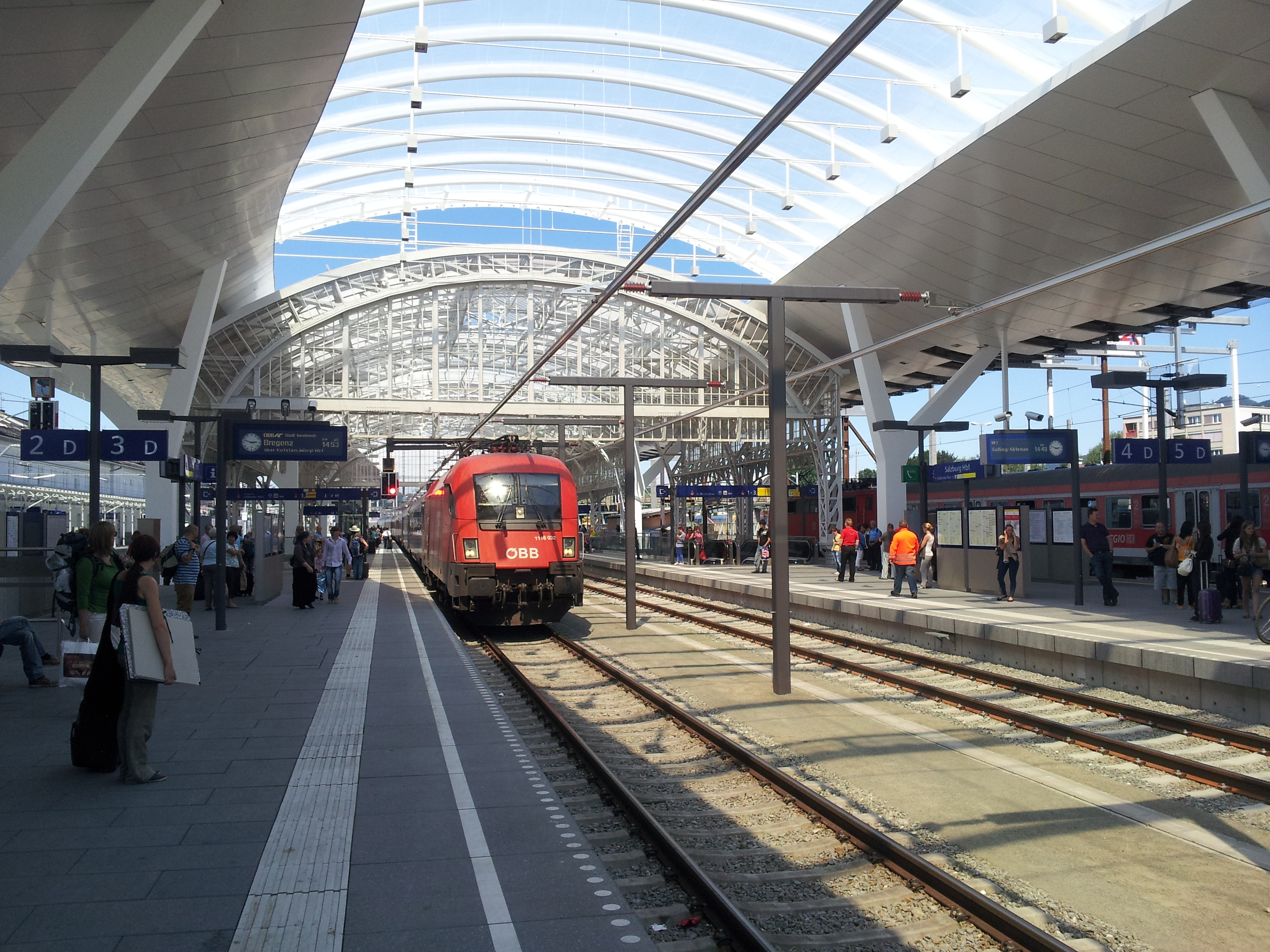
Salzburg Hauptbahnhof, a junction between local and long-distance transport routes

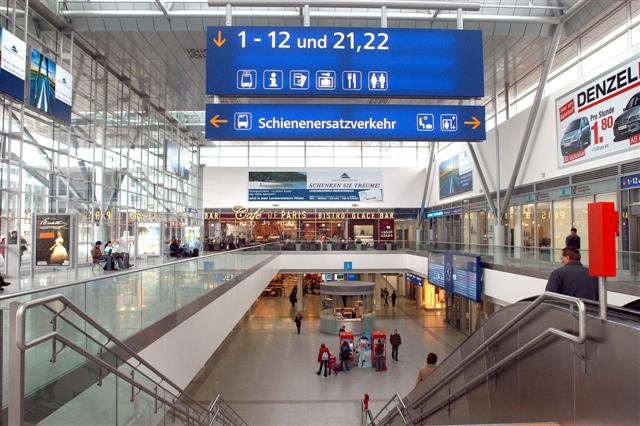
The current main hall of Linz Hauptbahnhof

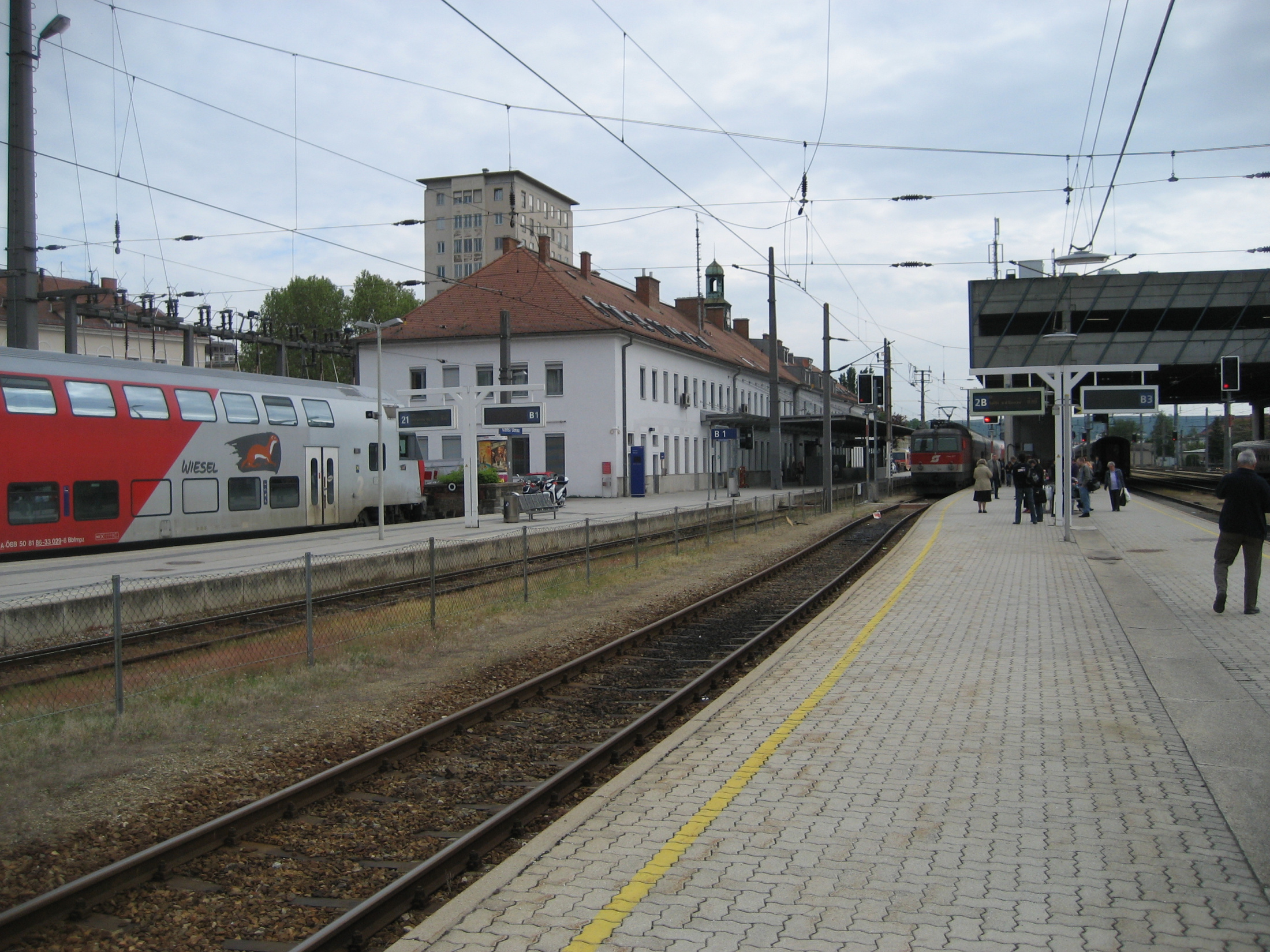
Regional train station in Krems, Lower Austria

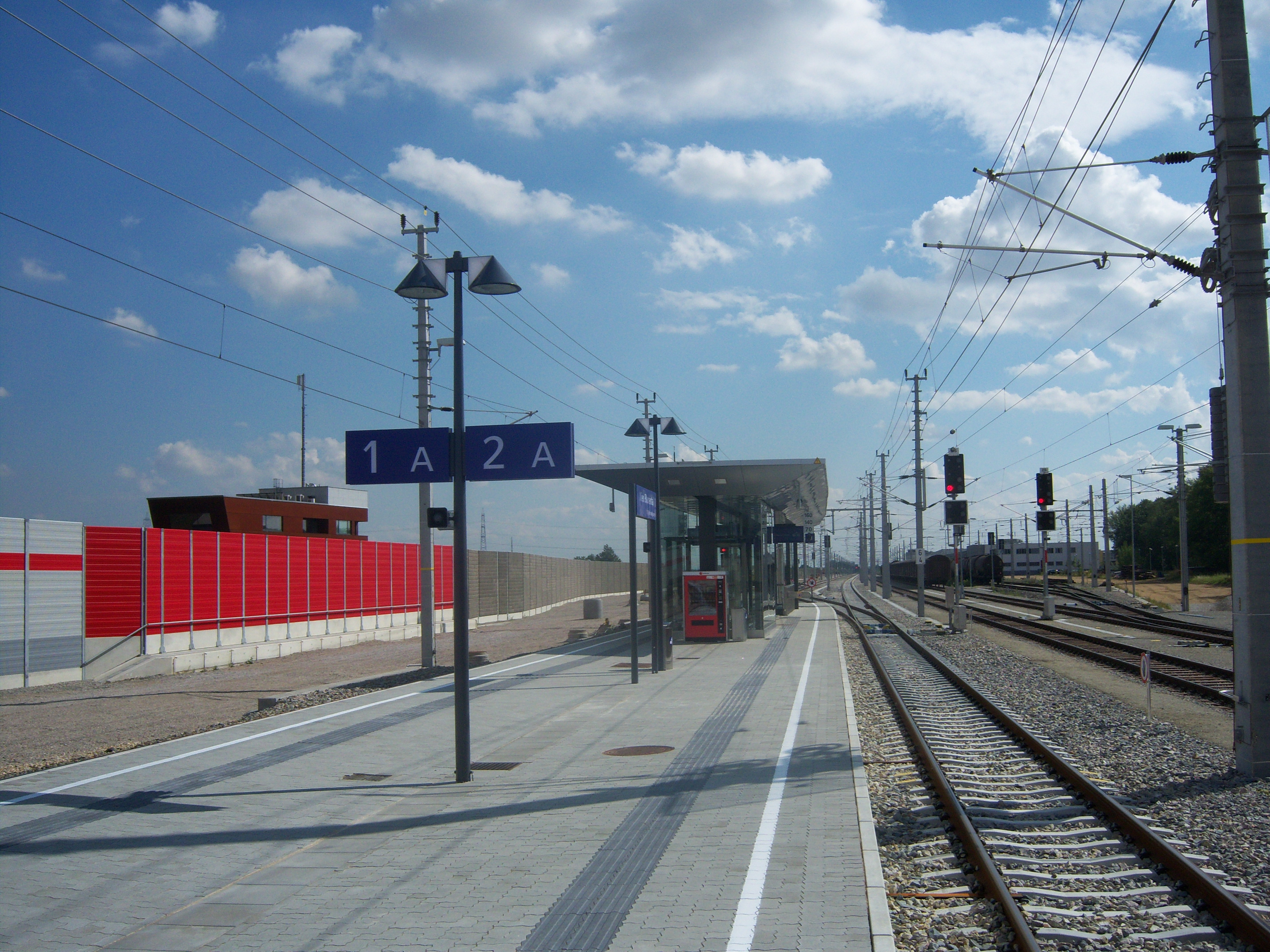
Typical commuter rail station south of Vienna

The Austrian Federal Railways (German: Österreichische Bundesbahnen [ˈøːstɐraɪçɪʃə ˈbʊndəsˌbaːnən], formally Österreichische Bundesbahnen-Holding Aktiengesellschaft or ÖBB-Holding AG (lit. 'Austrian Federal Railways Holding Stock Company') and formerly the Bundesbahnen Österreich [ˈbʊndəsˌbaːnən ˈøːstɐraɪç] or BBÖ [beːbeːˈʔøː]), now commonly known as ÖBB ([øːbeːˈbeː]), is the national railway company of Austria, and the administrator of Liechtenstein's railways. The ÖBB group is owned entirely by the Republic of Austria, and is divided into several separate businesses that manage the infrastructure and operate passenger and freight services.

The Austrian Federal Railways has had two discrete periods of existence. It was first formed in 1923, using the Bundesbahn Österreich name, as a successor to the Imperial Royal Austrian State Railways (kkStB), but was incorporated into the Deutsche Reichsbahn during the 1938–1945 Anschluss. It was reformed in 1947, under the slightly different name Österreichische Bundesbahnen, and remains in existence in this form.

Major changes currently being made to the Austrian railway network are the construction of the Koralm Railway, the Semmering Base Tunnel and the Brenner Base Tunnel connection with Italy.

Eurobarometer surveys conducted in 2018 showed that satisfaction levels of Austrian rail passengers are among the highest in the European Union when it comes to punctuality, reliability and frequency of trains. Furthermore, with their Nightjet brand, ÖBB operates Europe's largest night train fleet.

Unlike other major railway companies in Europe that offer more flexible cancellation policies, ÖBB only offers two types of tickets: full-price tickets, and cheaper but non-exchangeable and non-refundable tickets.

== History ==
- 1882 – Gradual nationalisation of the railway network of the Austro-Hungarian Empire into the Imperial Royal Austrian State Railways (Kaiserlich-königliche österreichische Staatsbahnen, kkStB). By the outbreak of the World War I, the only major railway in Austria to remain in private hands was the Austrian Southern Railway (Südbahn).
- 1918 – After the break-up of the Austro-Hungarian Empire following the World War I, the Austrian rump of kkStB remained in state control under the name Deutschösterreichische Staatsbahnen (DÖStB), which was renamed the Österreichische Staatsbahnen (ÖStB) in 1919.
- 1923 – Foundation of the independent, commercial enterprise, the Bundesbahn Österreich (which used the abbreviation BBÖ, because ÖBB was already taken by the Swiss Oensingen-Balsthal-Bahn). This company took over the assets of the ÖStB and the Südbahn, together with other minor railways, like the Lower Austrian State Railways.
- 1938 – The Anschluss of Austria into the Third Reich. The BBÖ was taken over by the Deutsche Reichsbahn. During World War II about 41% of the Austrian railway network was destroyed.
- 1947 – The company was reformed using the slightly different name of Österreichische Bundesbahnen and the abbreviation ÖBB (by that time the Swiss private railway used the abbreviation SP for its goods wagons in international traffic, so its abbreviation ÖBB could now be appropriated) as a state-owned company. Their infrastructure was rebuilt and electrification was accelerated.
- 1969 – A new federal railway law was enacted. The ÖBB became a non-independent, economic entity, that was run as a branch of the government's industrial programme and remained entirely within the Federal budget.
- 1992 – The ÖBB were broken out of the federal budget and turned into company with its own legal status (a cross between a GmbH and an AG in Austrian commercial terms). The company is 100% owned by the Republic of Austria. This change had two primary aims: 1. It had to conform to EU rules on the admission of Austria into the European Union. 2. The financial demand on the public purse was to be reduced as a result of improvements in efficiency and the pressure of competition.
- 2004 – The ÖBB were reorganised into ÖBB Holding AG and a number of operating subsidiaries. The holding company was to oversee the operations of the companies assigned to it, coordinate a coherent strategic approach and allocate tasks for the whole enterprise.
- 1 January 2005 – The subsidiaries of ÖBB-Holding AG became autonomous and independent operationally.
- In 2006, ÖBB sold the Bodensee shipping company to Vorarlberger Illwerke
- In 2012, ÖBB celebrated the 175th anniversary of the Nordbahn, the earliest predecessor company marking the start of rail transport in Austria. ÖBB CEO Christian Kern inaugurated an exhibition on the company's collaboration with Nazi Germany, named "The Suppressed Years – Railway and National Socialism in Austria 1938–1945". He referred to that period as "the darkest chapter of our company history," adding that the company must accept this period as part of its legacy. The exhibition later went on tour and was presented at the European Parliament's parliamentary building in Brussels.
- In October 2015, ÖBB Ferbus was founded with 28 Mercedes-Benz Tourismo coaches. It was rebranded Hello in July 2016. It was sold to Flixbus in May 2017.
- In October 2023, ÖBB purchased the operations of Go-Ahead Germany.

The Austrian rail system is largely electrified. Electrification of the system began in 1912 but did not reach an advanced state until the 1950s. The last steam locomotive in regular service on the standard gauge network was retired in 1978.

The post-war laws related to the Austrian railways were the:

- Eisenbahngesetz (EisbG 1957),
- Schieneninfrastrukturfinanzierungsgesetz (SCHIG 1999),
- Eisenbahnhochleistungsstreckengesetz (HIG 1999) and
- Bundesbahngesetz (1992).

== Logo history ==
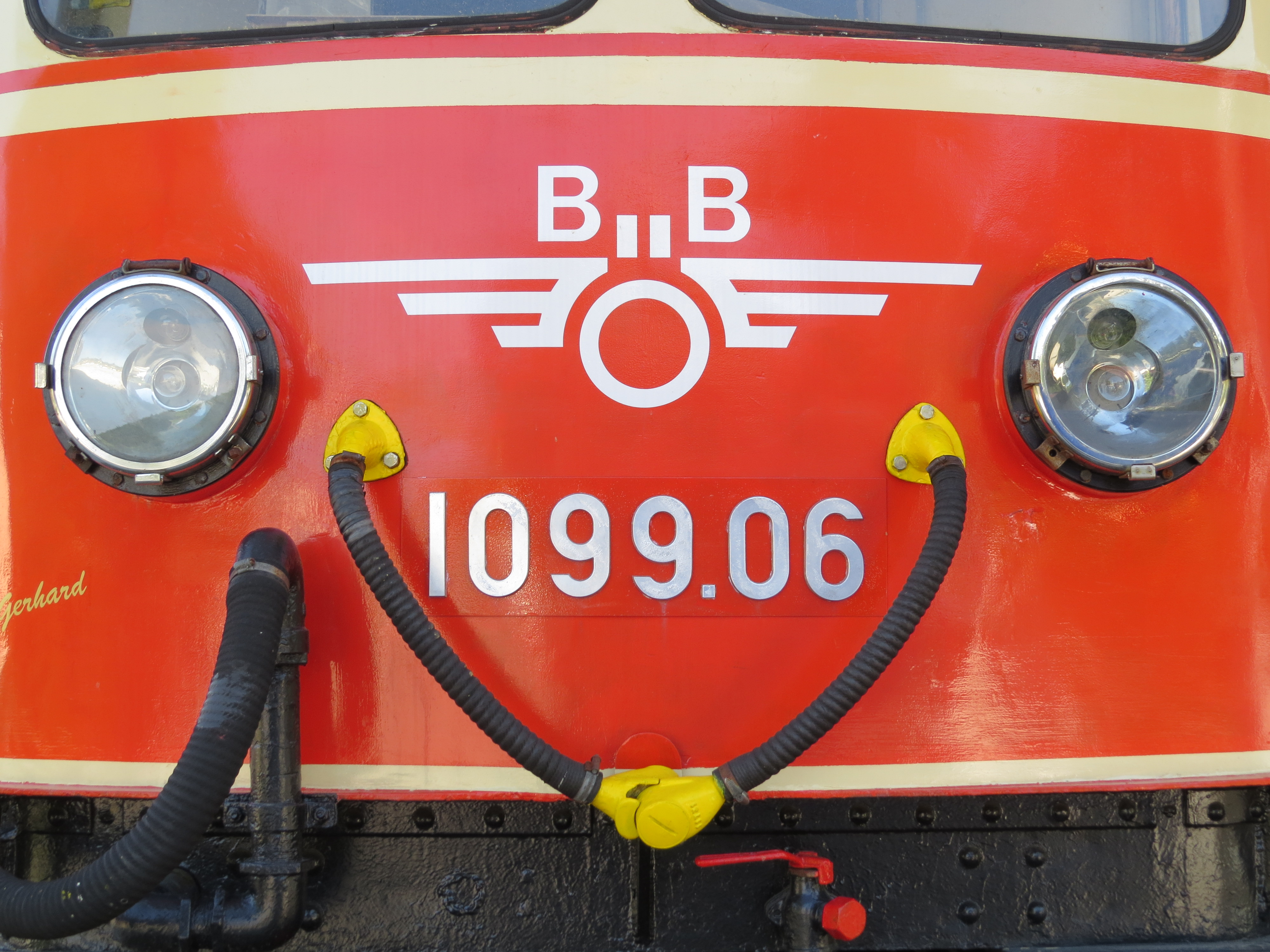
ÖBB's first logo. It consists of a flying wheel-styled symbol with one "B" on each side of the "Ö", and was used from 1960 to 1974.

ÖBB's second logo consists of a stylized "O" symbol with extending arrows. Within Austria it was nicknamed the "Pflatsch" (lit. spatter, spot), and was officially used from 1974 to 2004, although some stations and vehicles used it up to the mid-late 2010s. It continued to be used when ÖBB's current logo was introduced in 1998.

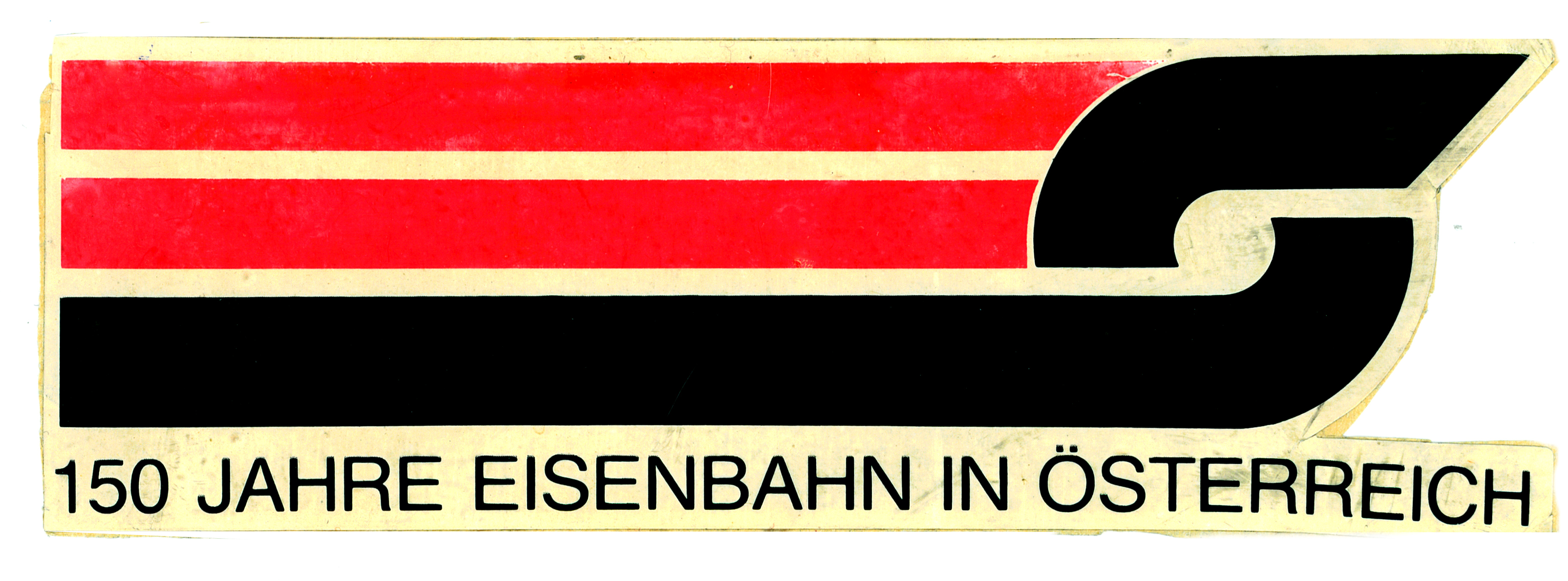
This is a special variant of the "Pflatsch" logo, created in 1987 for the 150th anniversary of railway in Austria.

This combination of the old "Pflatsch" logo and a new ÖBB stylized text was rarely used due to the former's popularity within Austria. It was in use between 1998 and 2004.

The current ÖBB logo, used since 1998.

== Current structure ==
By a law of August 2009, the organisational structure dating from 2005 was further modified; the railways are under the control of ÖBB-Holding AG, a holding company wholly owned by the Austrian state, under the Ministry of Transport.

The holding company has a number of subsidiaries:

- ÖBB-Holding AG
  - ÖBB-Personenverkehr AG (Passenger transport)
    - ÖBB-Postbus GmbH
    - ÖBB-Produktion GmbH (50% shares)
    - ÖBB-Technische Services GmbH (75% shares) (railroad vehicle maintenance)
    - Rail Tours Touristik GmbH
    - iMobility GmbH (mobile app developer)
    - ÖV Ticketshop GmbH (online ticket distributor)
  - Rail Cargo Austria AG (RCA) (Freight transport)
    - Rail Cargo Hungaria Zrt.
    - ÖBB-Produktion GmbH (50% shares)
    - ÖBB-Technische Services GmbH (25% shares)
    - Rail Cargo Logistics – Austria GmbH
    - Rail Cargo Carrier Kft.
    - Rail Cargo Operator - CSKD s.r.o
  - ÖBB-Infrastruktur AG (Infrastructure planning, management, and construction)
    - ÖBB-Immobilienmanagement GmbH
    - Mungos Sicher & Sauber GmbH (Security and Cleaning)
    - Rail Equipment GmbH
    - WS Service GmbH (51% shares)
    - Brenner Basistunnel BBT SE (50% shares)
    - Weichenwerk Wörth GmbH (43.05% shares)
  - ÖBB-Business Competence Center GmbH
  - ÖBB-Werbung GmbH
  - ÖBB-Finanzierungsservice GmbH

== Infrastructure ==
The infrastructure of the state-owned Austrian network is managed by ÖBB-Infrastruktur AG, which was formed from former infrastructure-related units including Brenner Eisenbahn GmbH. It now manages 9,740 km of track, 788 signal boxes, 247 tunnels, 6,207 bridges and eight hydro-electric power (hep) stations for the 16.7 Hz electrification system, and two hep stations for 50 Hz power generation.

As of 2009 it employed 17,612 staff.

Österreichische Bundesbahnen
Sales	Infrastructure
Passenger transport	Network
Freight transport	Tracks
Traction	Signal-/System technology
Technical services	Telekom
Power plants	Energy network
Facility management	Planning/Engineering
	Facility management

== Statistics ==
According to the Annual Report 2013, the company employs 39,513, there of 13,599 employees, 24,251 tenured employees and 1,663 apprentices. In 2013, ÖBB-Personenverkehr AG carried 469 million passengers of which 235 million were bus passengers. The ÖBB has

- 4,859 km (3,020 route miles); 72% electrified
- 1,128 train stations
- 1,093 locomotives
- 2,799 passenger vehicles
- 26,518 freight wagons
- 2,200 busses
- ÖBB's bus services travel 52,500,000 km (32,621,988 mi) per year.

== Principal lines ==
- Western Railway from Wien Westbahnhof via St. Pölten Hauptbahnhof and Linz Hauptbahnhof to Salzburg Hauptbahnhof, including a parallel high-speed rail section ("New Western Railway") from Wien Meidling railway station to Linz
- Southern Railway from Wien Hauptbahnhof/Wien Meidling to Graz Hauptbahnhof, including the Semmering railway section – a UNESCO World Heritage Site
  - continuation to Klagenfurt by the Koralm Railway (under construction)
- Northern Railway from Wien Praterstern railway station to Břeclav, Czech Republic
- Eastern Railway from Vienna Hauptbahnhof (under construction) to Hegyeshalom, Hungary and Budapest Keleti railway station
- Emperor Franz Joseph Railway from Wien Franz-Josefs-Bahnhof to Gmünd, Lower Austria and České Velenice, Czech Republic
- Salzburg-Tyrol Railway from Salzburg Hauptbahnhof to Wörgl Hauptbahnhof
- Enns Valley Railway from the Salzburg-Tyrol Railway at Bischofshofen to Selzthal
- Pannonia Railway between Parndorf and Wulkaprodersdorf
- Tauern Railway from the Salzburg-Tyrol Railway at Schwarzach/Sankt Veit to Spittal an der Drau via the Tauern Railway Tunnel
- Lower Inn Valley Railway from the German border near Kufstein railway station via Wörgl Hauptbahnhof to Innsbruck Hauptbahnhof; to be relieved by the New Lower Inn Valley railway line (under construction), part of the Trans-European Berlin–Palermo railway axis
  - western continuation by the Arlberg Railway to Bludenz railway station via the Arlberg Railway Tunnel
  - northwestern continuation by the Mittenwald Railway to Garmisch-Partenkirchen, Germany and the Ausserfern Railway to Kempten Hauptbahnhof
  - southern continuation by the Brenner Railway to Bozen, Italy and Verona via the Innsbruck bypass and the Brenner Pass, to be replaced by the Brenner Base Tunnel (planned)

== Rail links to adjacent countries ==
All neighbouring railways have the same gauge.

- Czech Republic — voltage and frequency change to 25 kV 50 Hz AC
- Germany — same voltage and frequency 15 kV 16.7 Hz AC
- Hungary — voltage and frequency change to 25 kV 50 Hz AC
- Italy — voltage and frequency change to 3 kV DC
- Liechtenstein — same voltage and frequency 15 kV 16.7 Hz AC
- Slovakia — voltage and frequency change to 25 kV 50 Hz AC
- Slovenia — voltage and frequency change to 3 kV DC
- Switzerland — same voltage and frequency 15 kV 16.7 Hz AC

== Active rolling stock ==
=== Electric locomotives ===
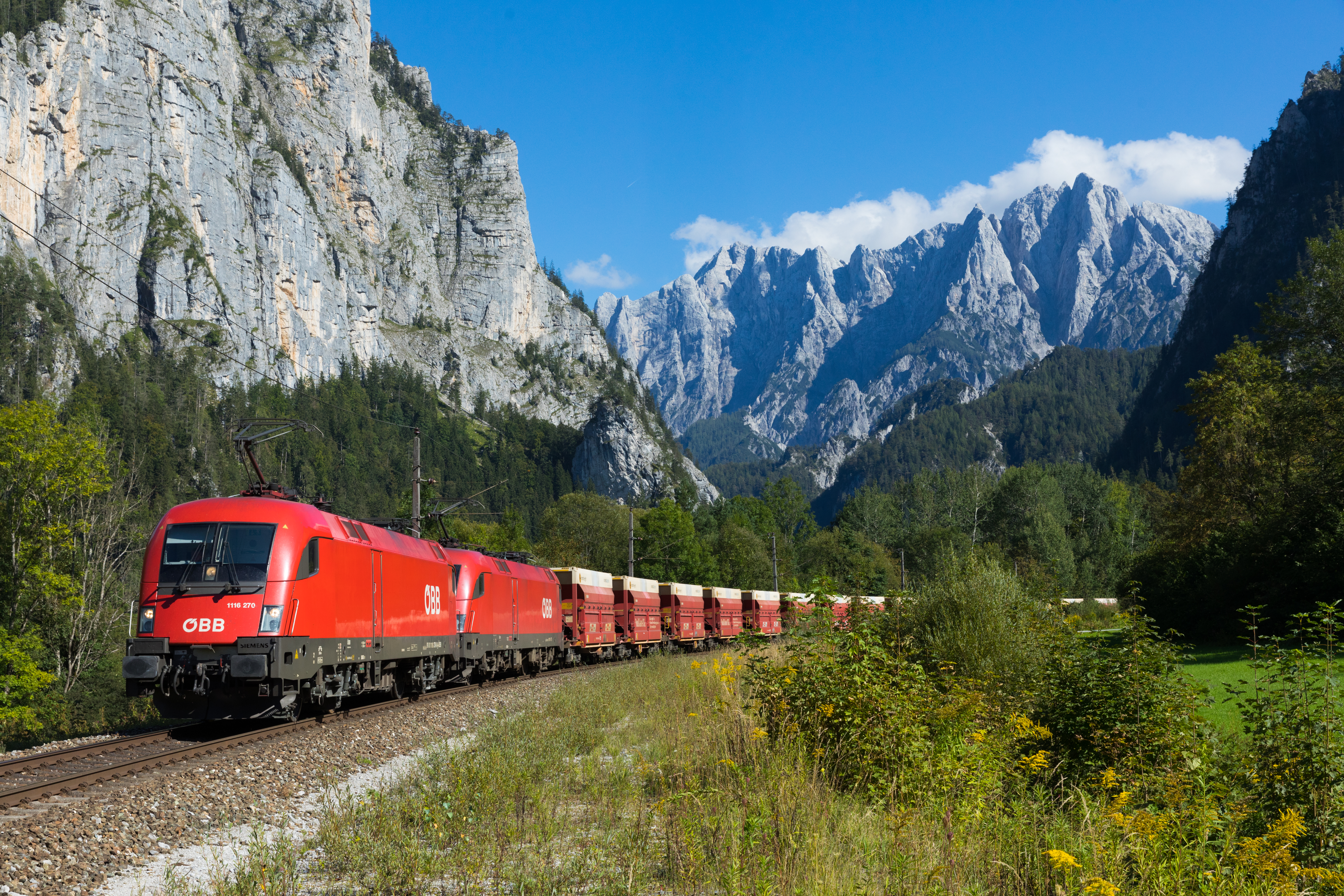
ÖBB Class 1016/1116/1216 Taurus

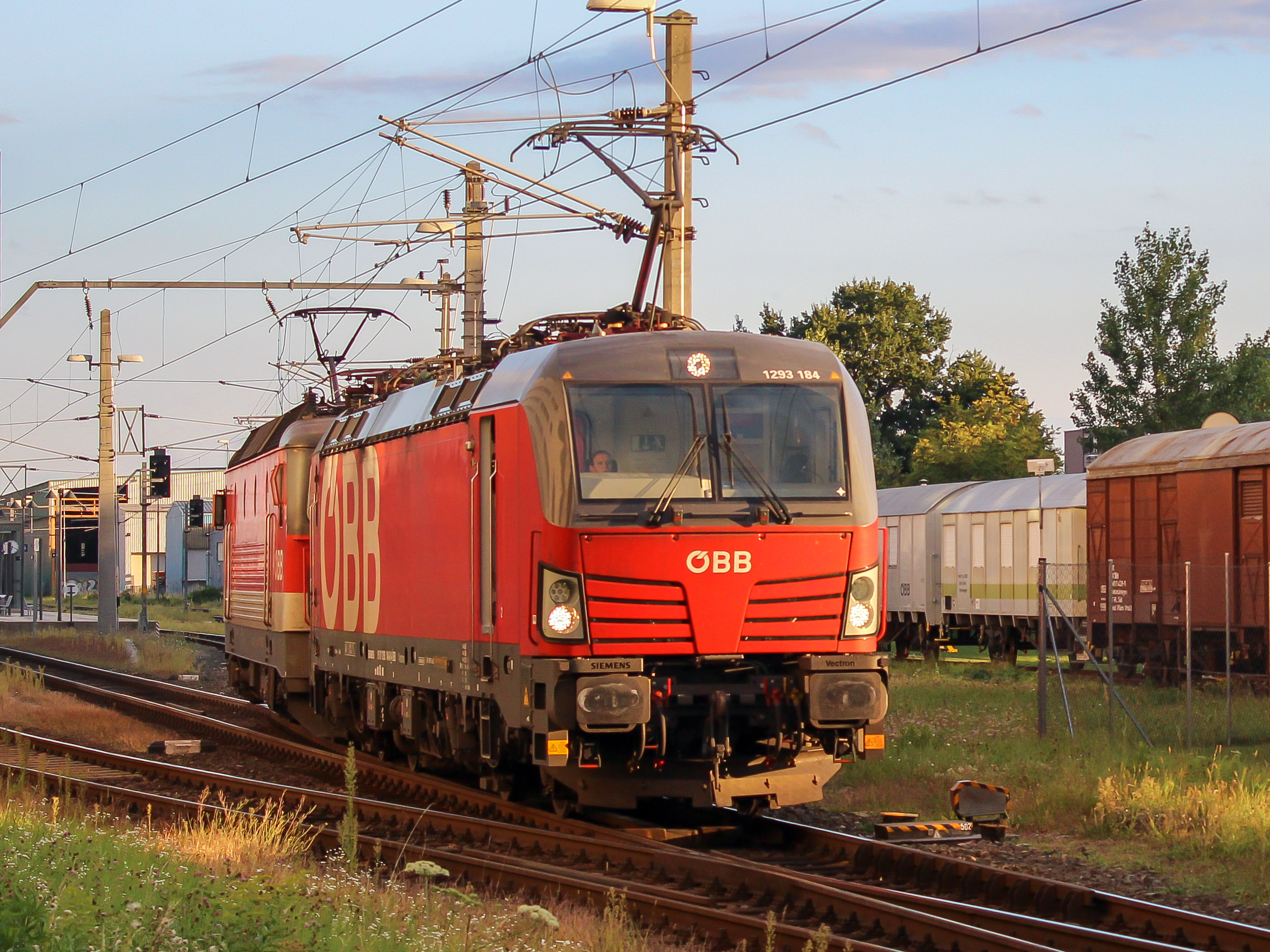
ÖBB Class 1293 Vectron

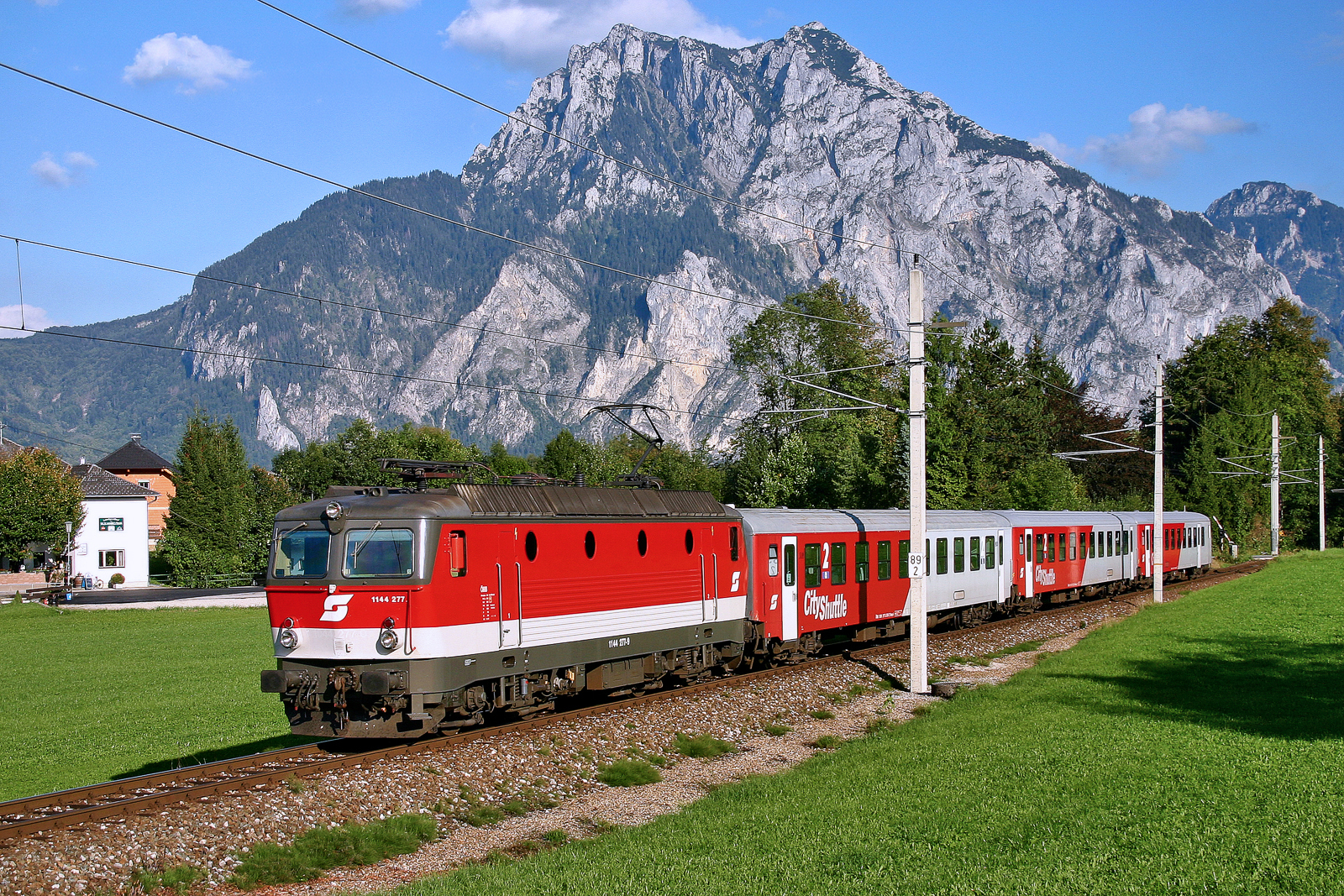
ÖBB Class 1144 Alpenstaubsauger
(eng. alpine hoover)

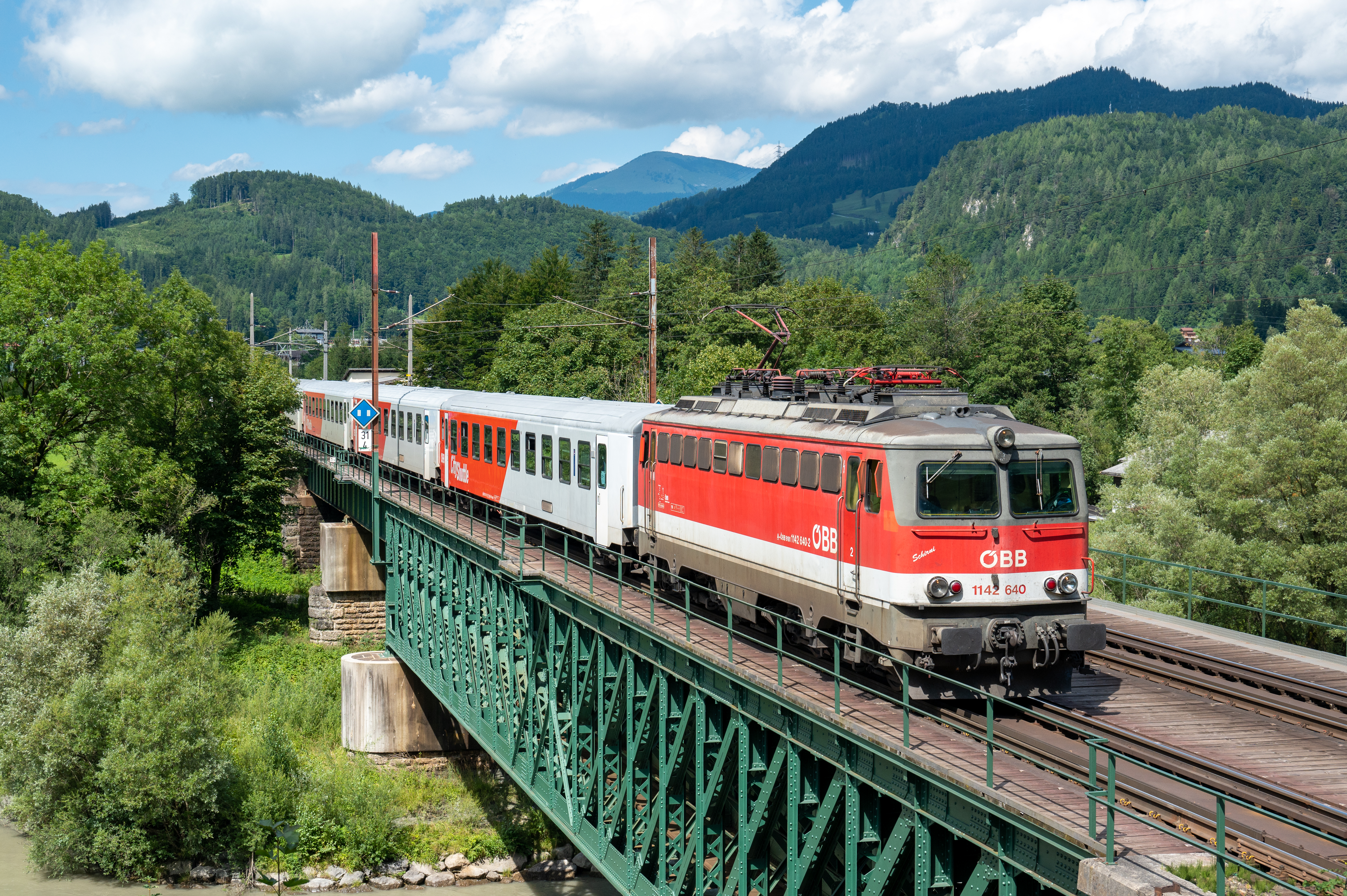
ÖBB Class 1142

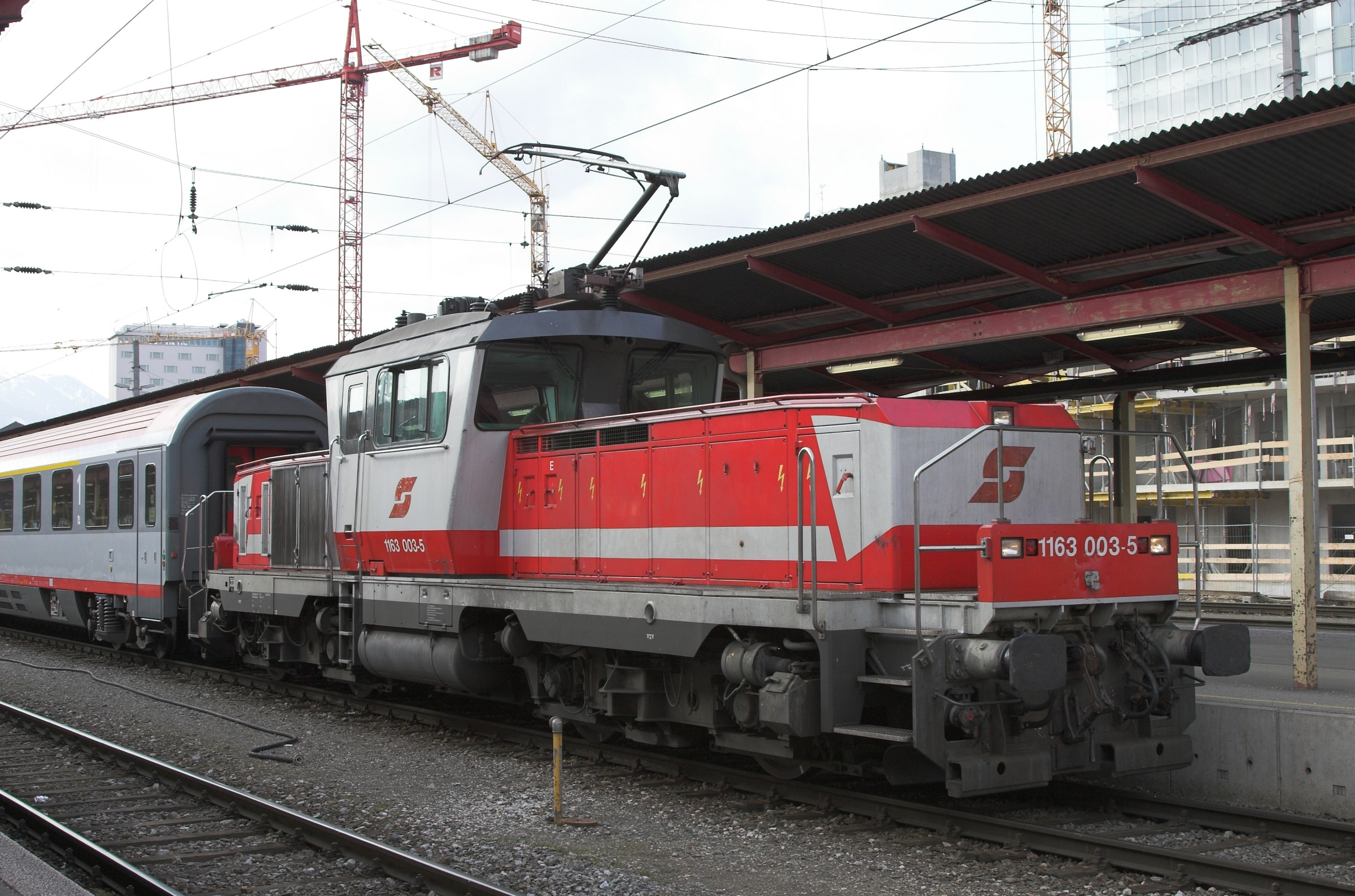
ÖBB Class 1163

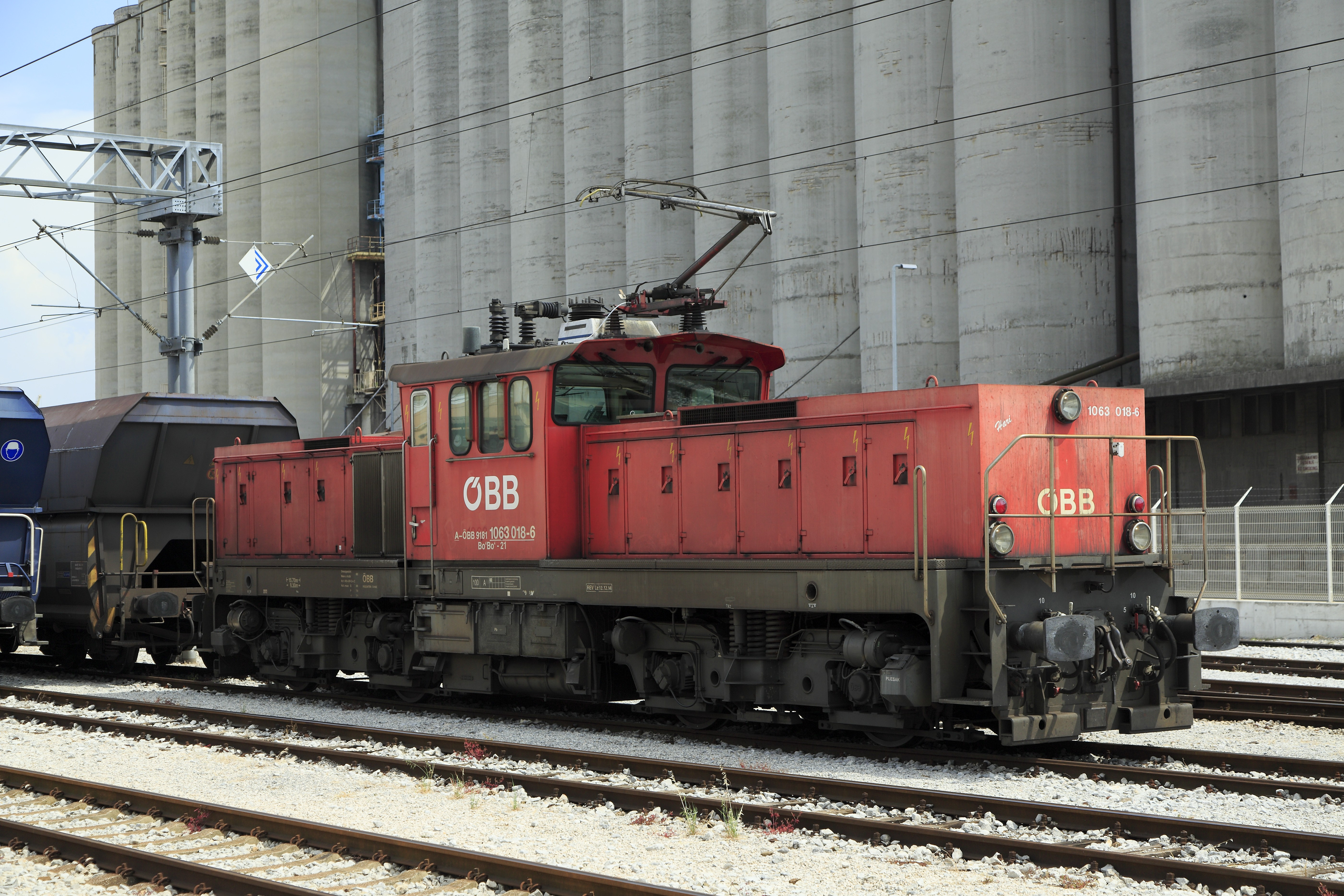
ÖBB Class 1063

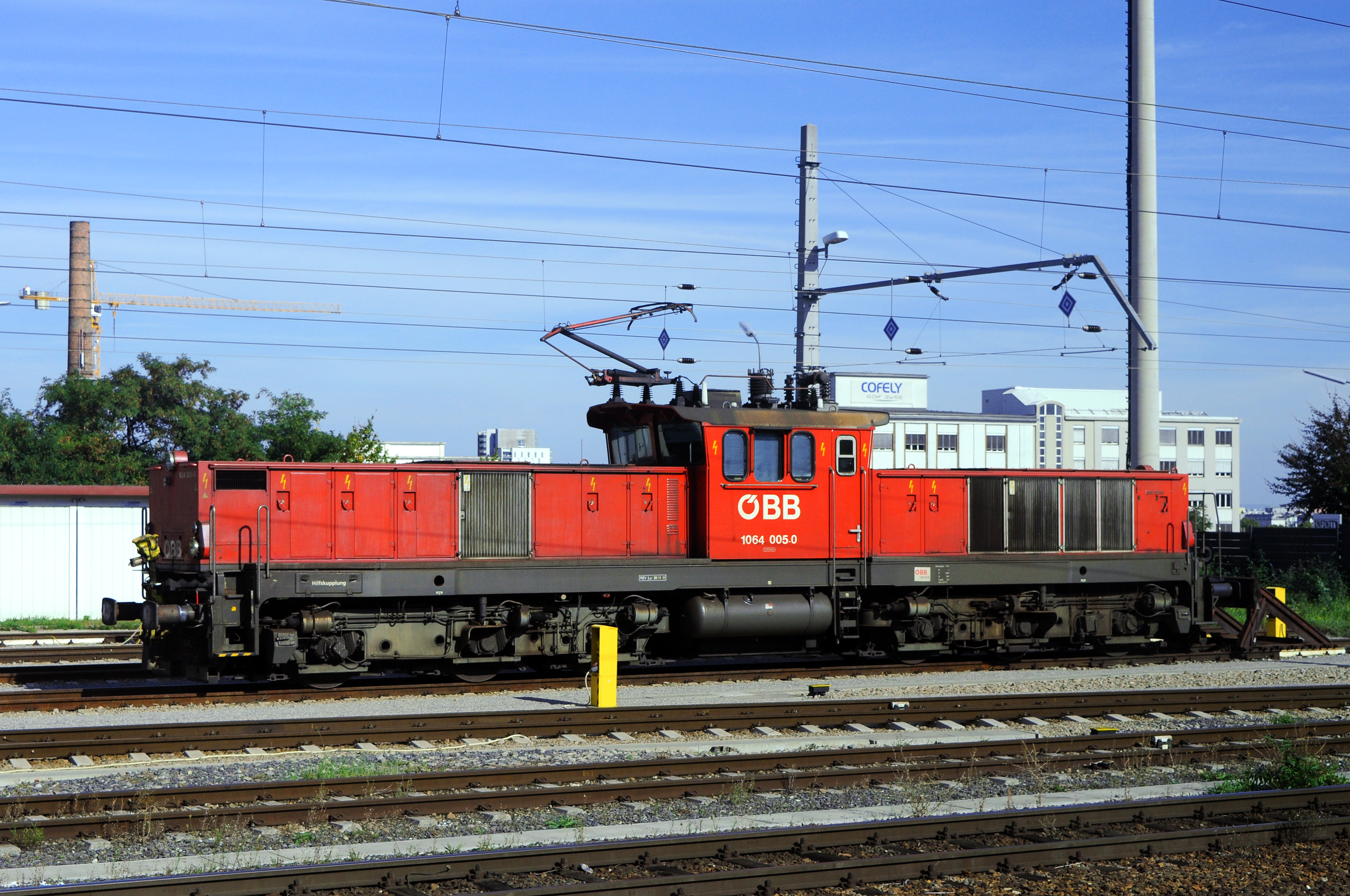
ÖBB Class 1064

=== Diesel locomotives ===
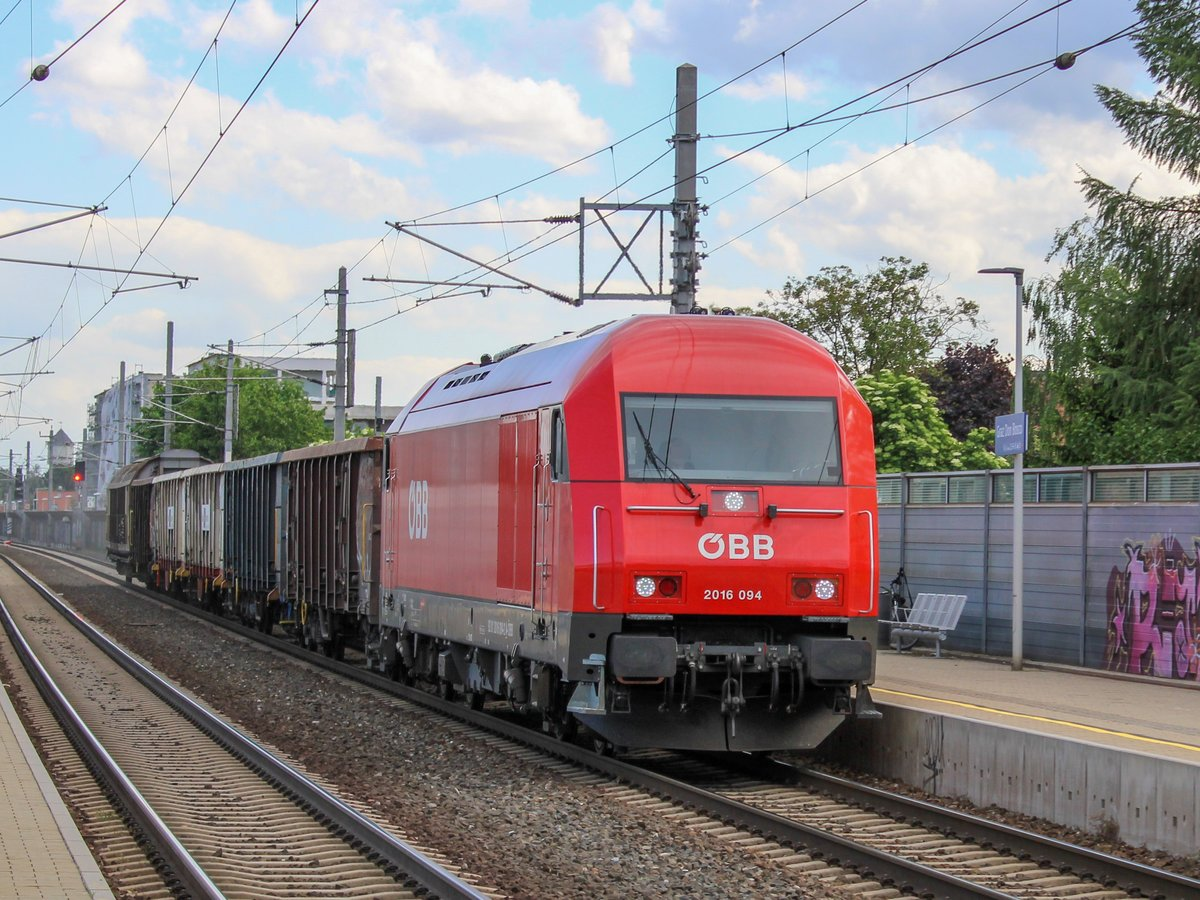
ÖBB Class 2016 Hercules

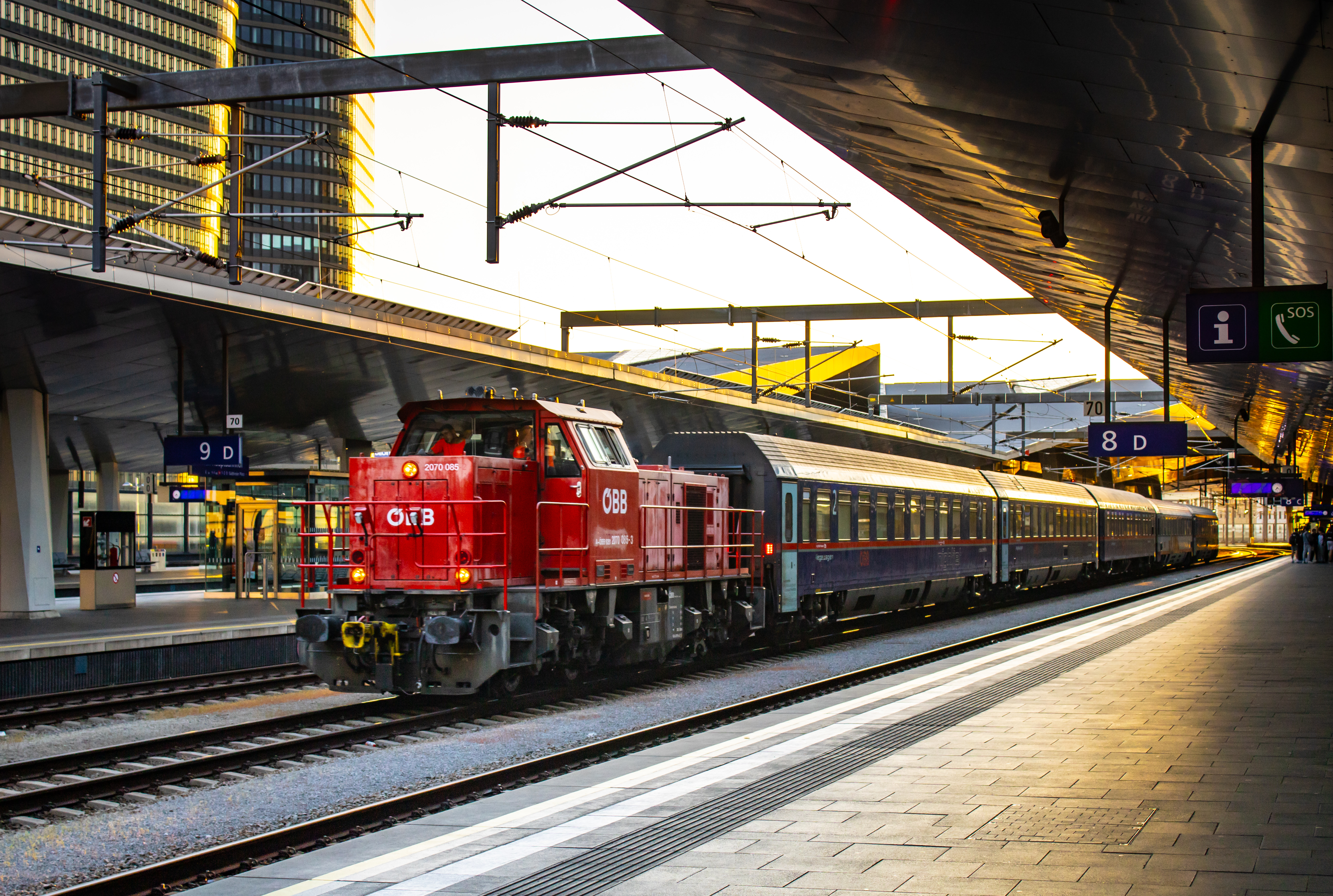
ÖBB Class 2070 Hector

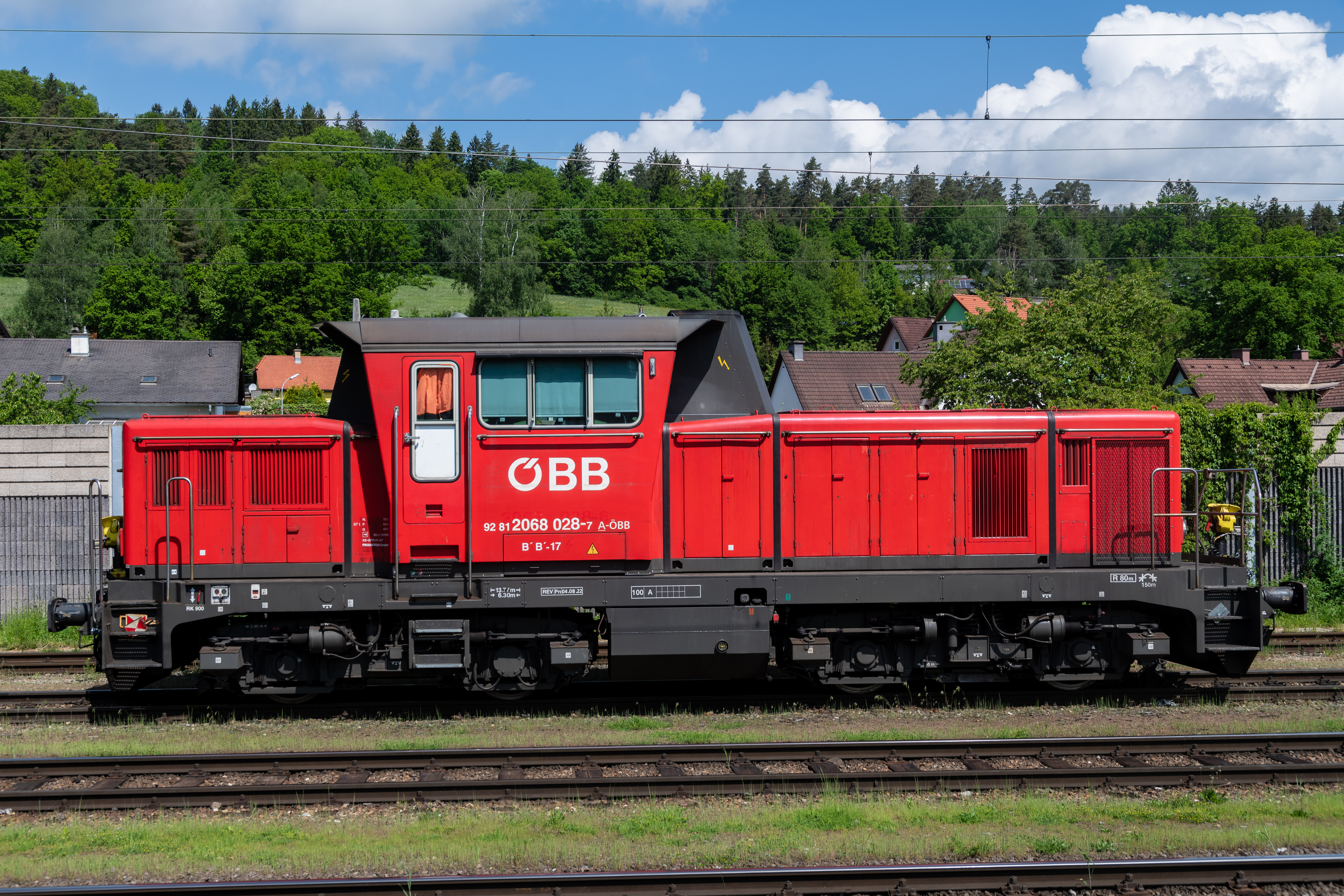
ÖBB Class 2068

=== Electrical multiple units ===
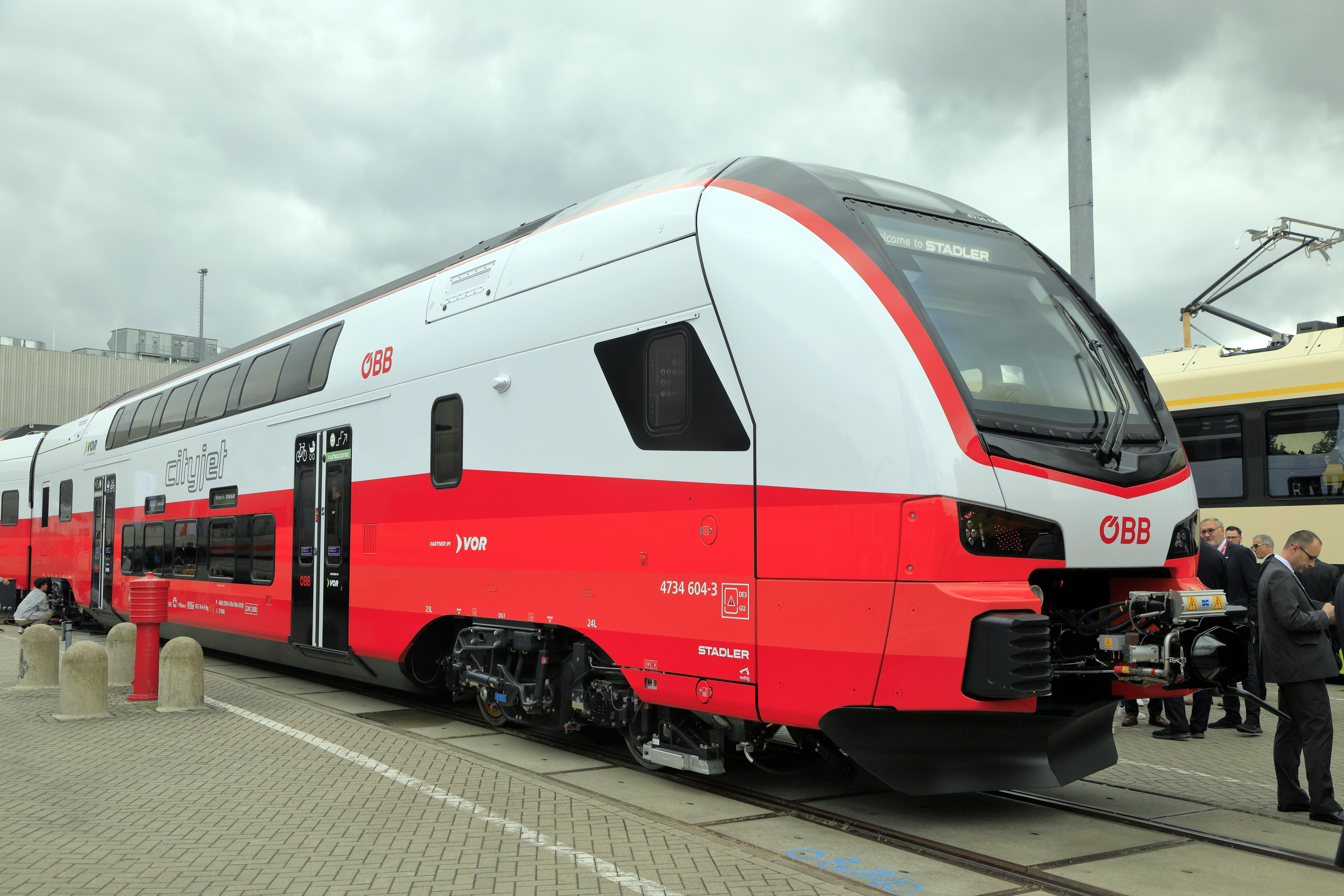
ÖBB 4734/4736 Stadler KISS

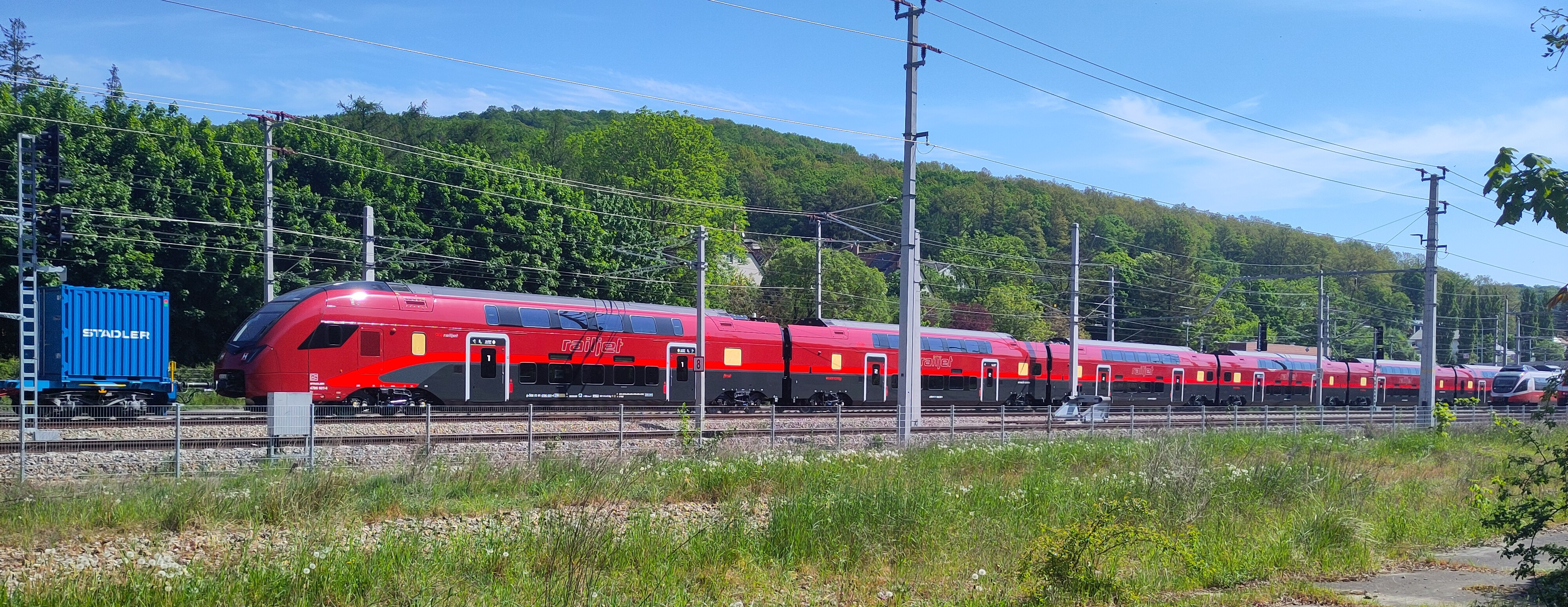
ÖBB 4706 Railjet 3 (KISS)

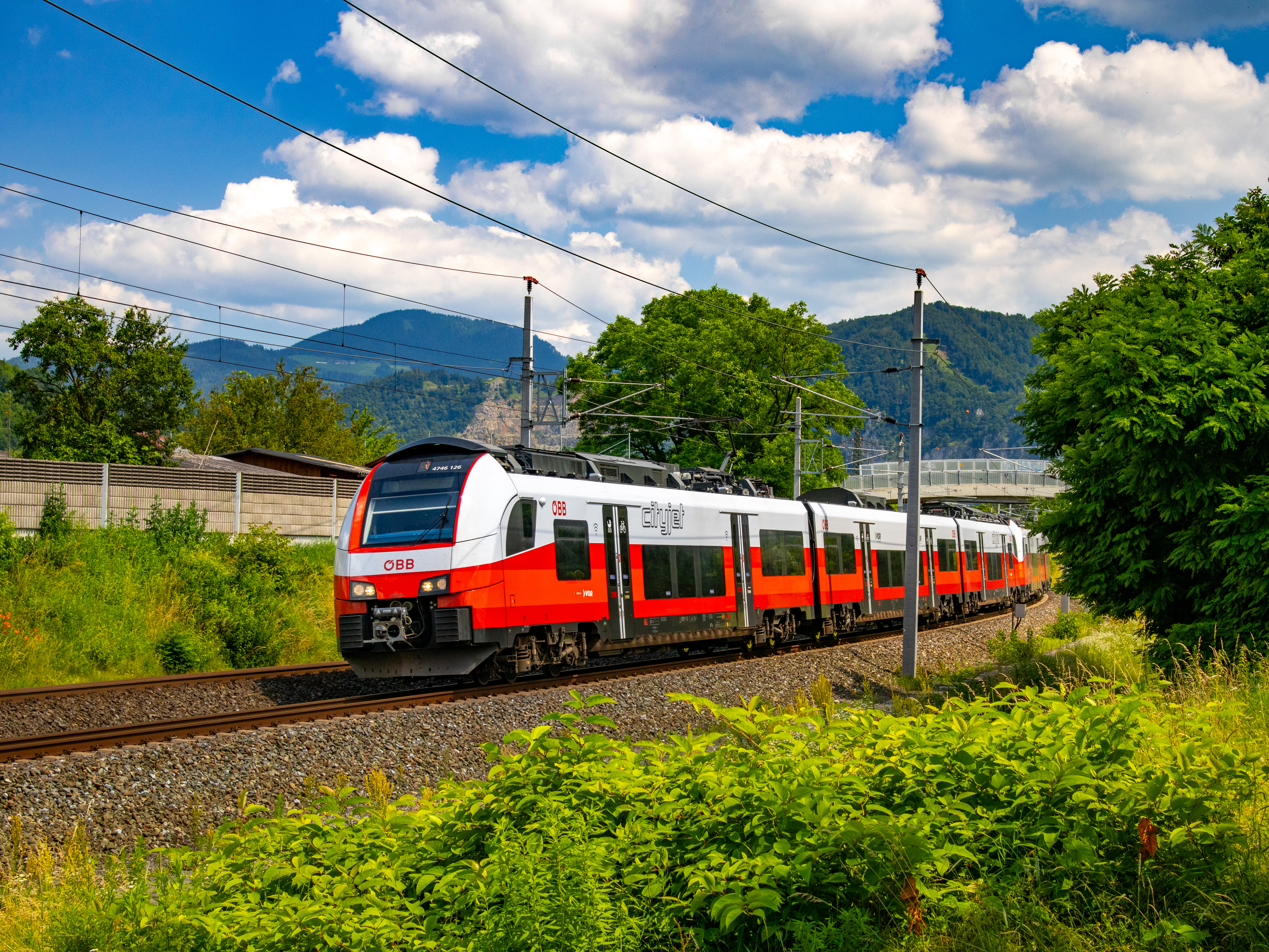
ÖBB Class 4744/4746/4748 Desiro ML

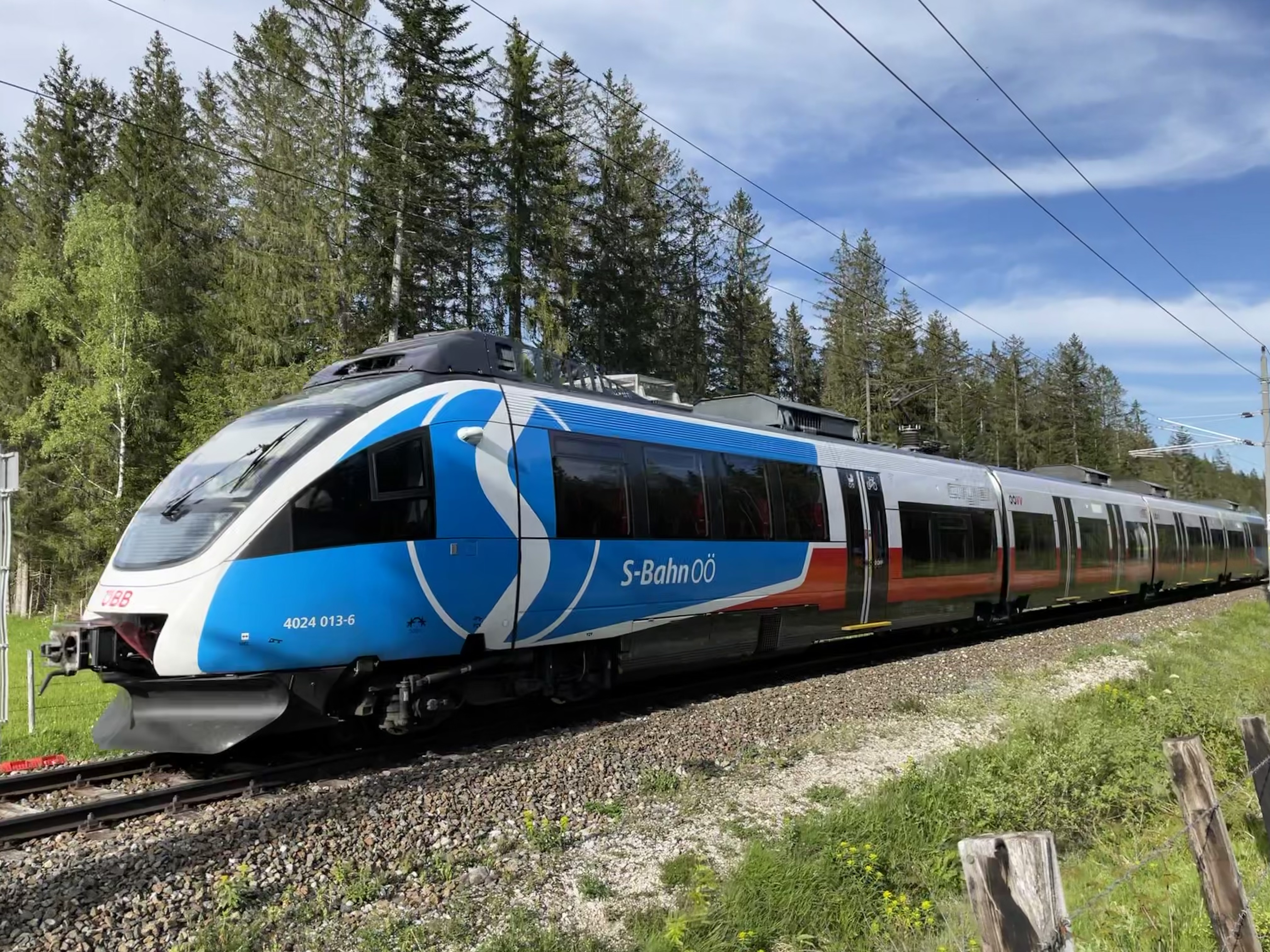
ÖBB Class 4023/4024/
4124 Talent

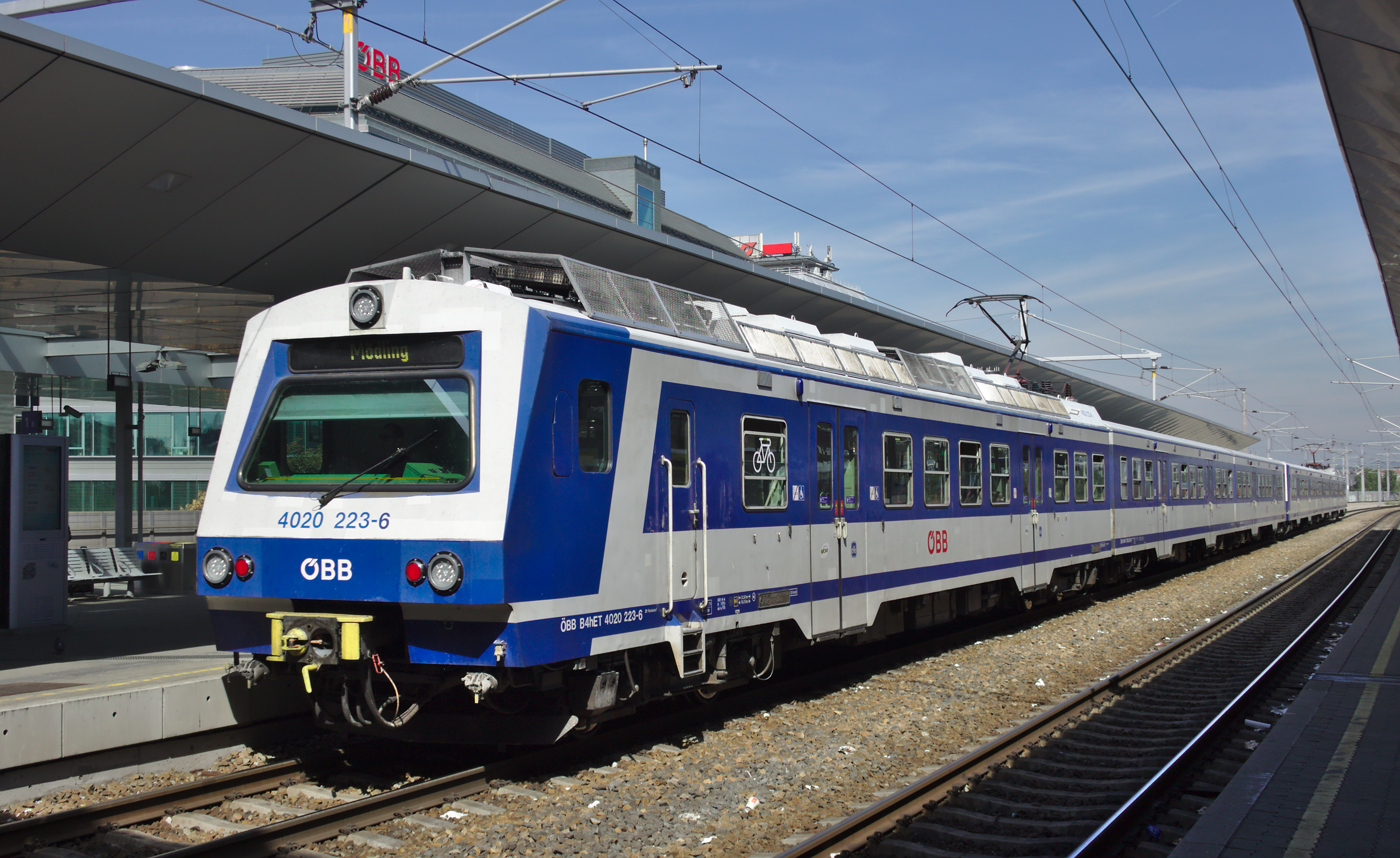
ÖBB Class 4020

=== Diesel railcars ===
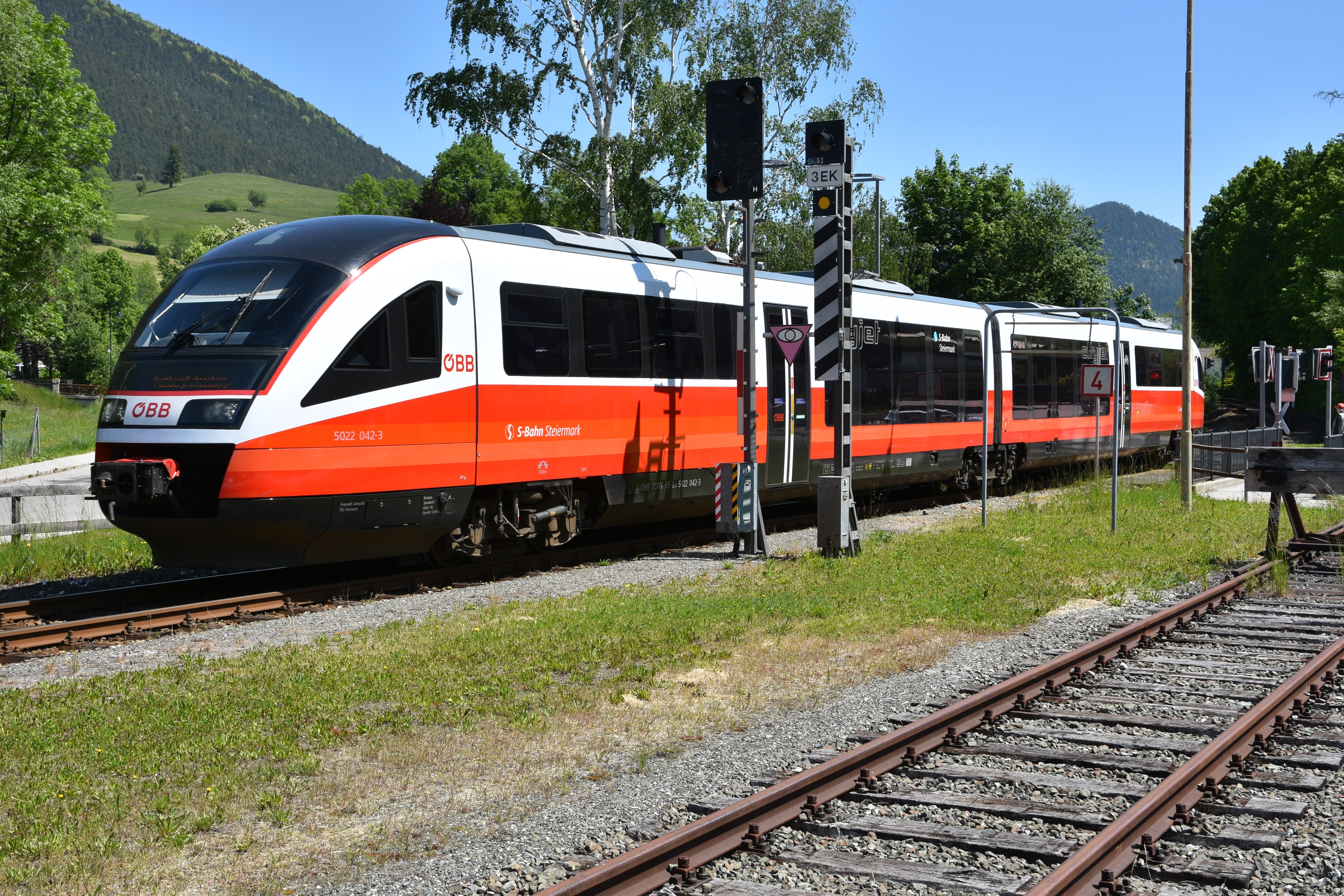
ÖBB Class 5022

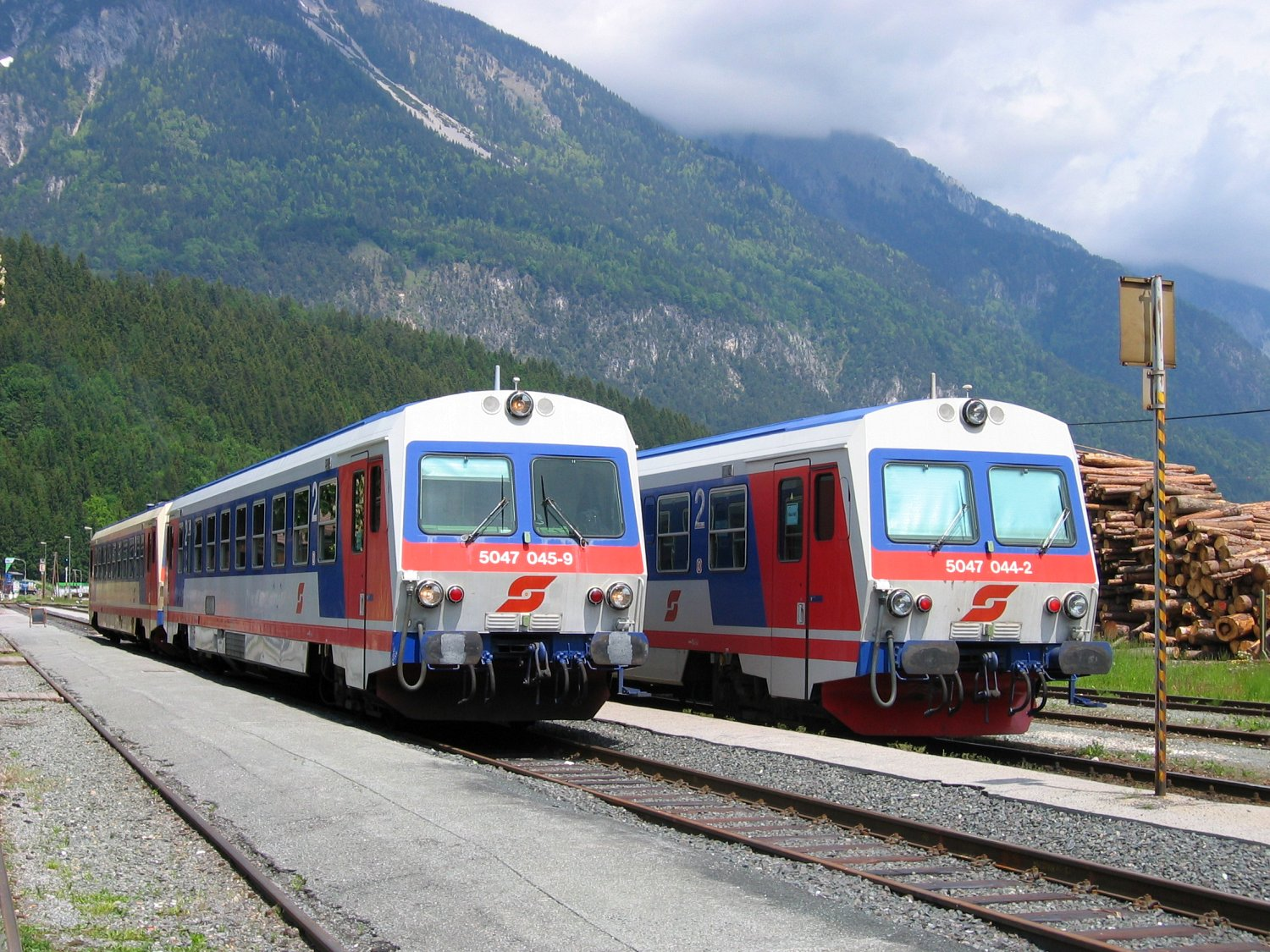
ÖBB Class 5047

=== Maintenance of other equipment ===
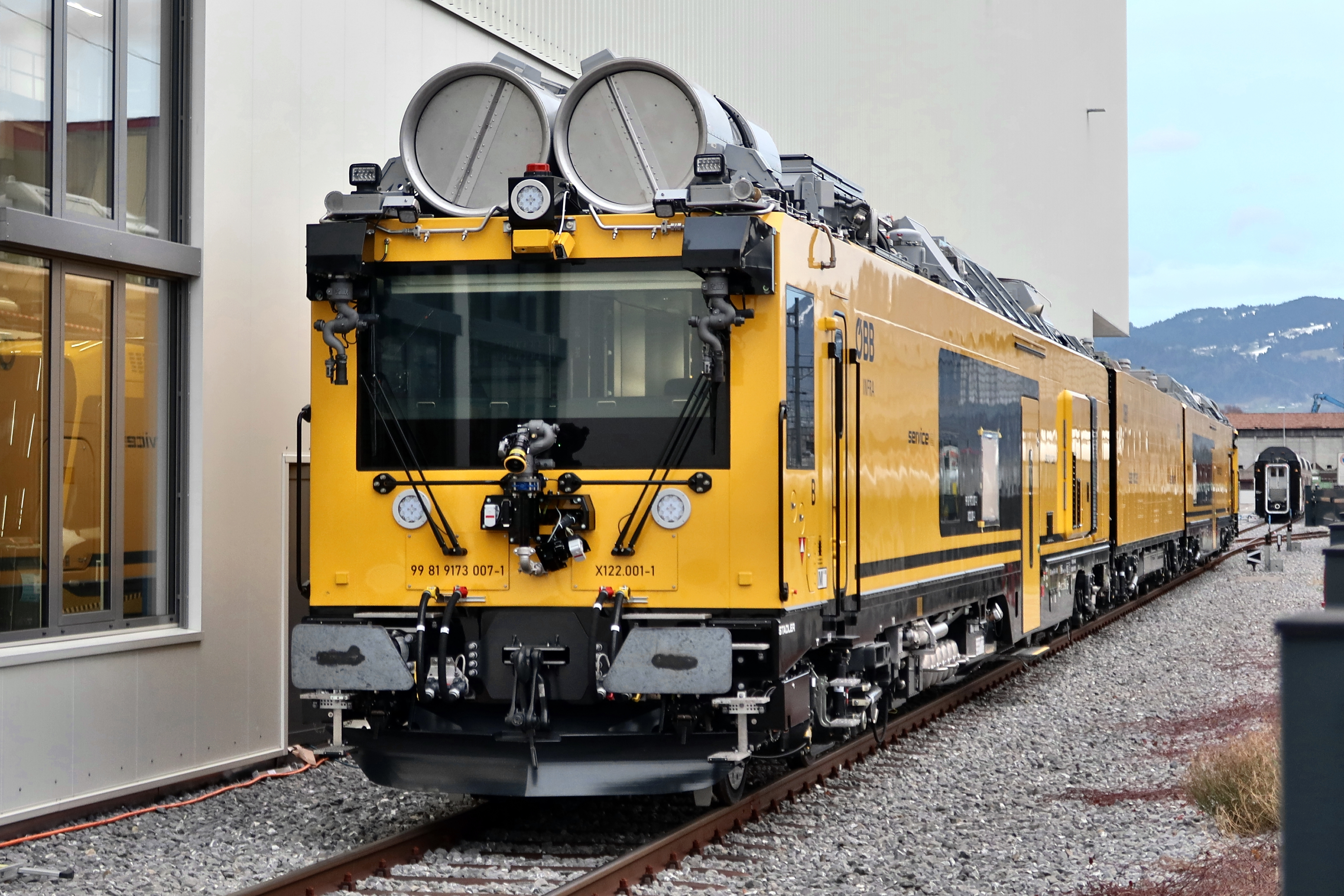
ÖBB Servicejet

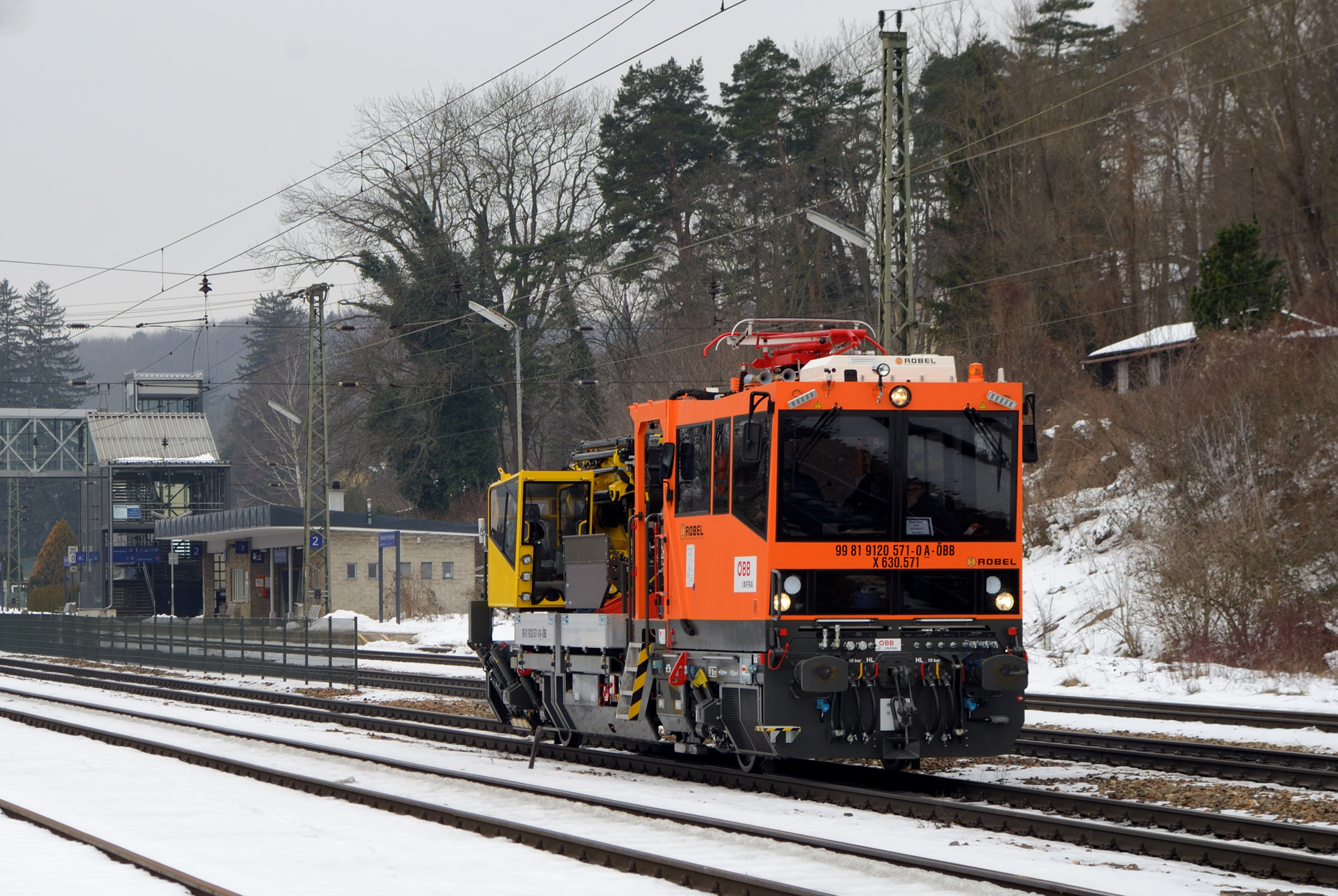
ÖBB Class X630

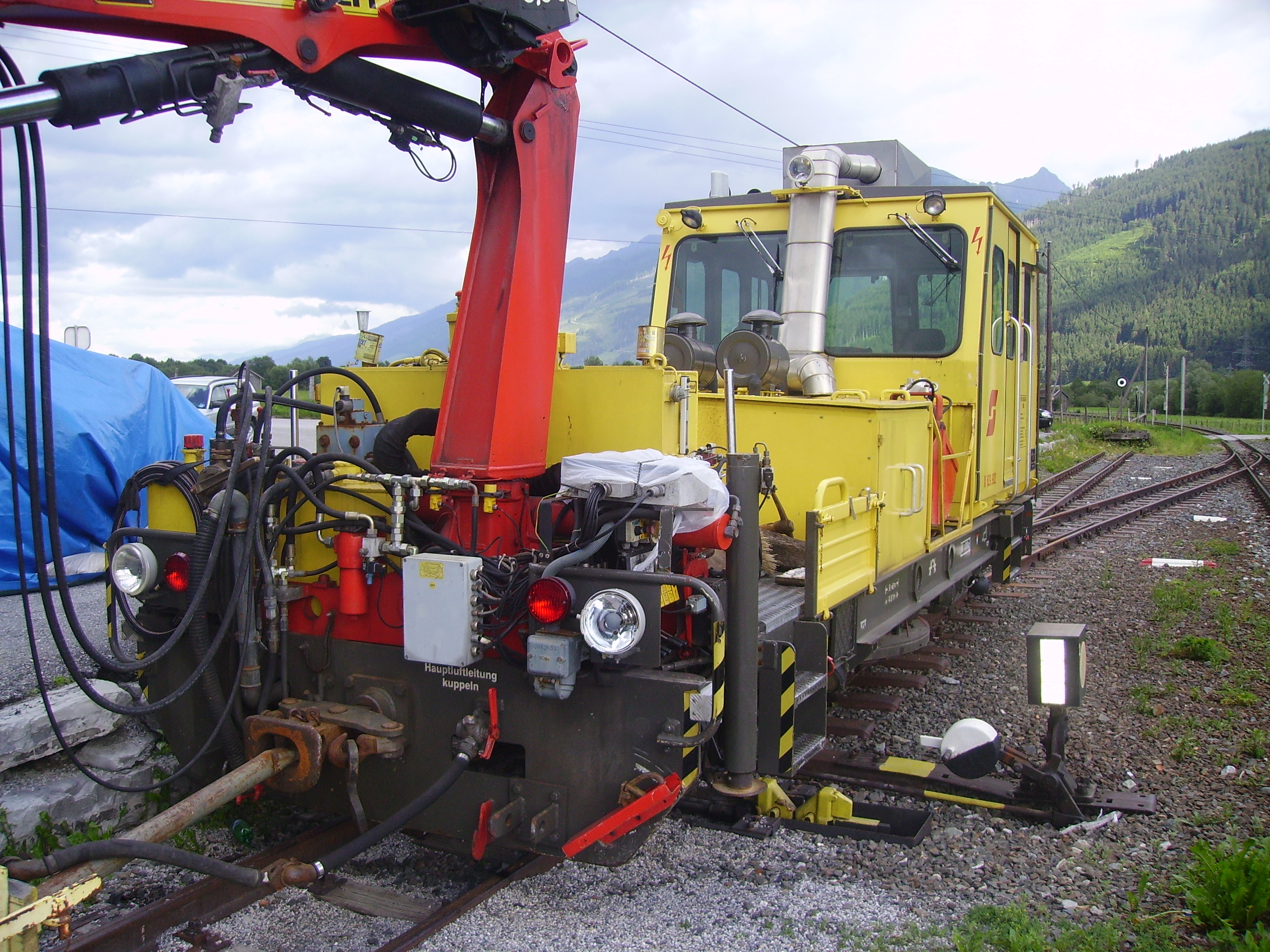
ÖBB Class X629.9

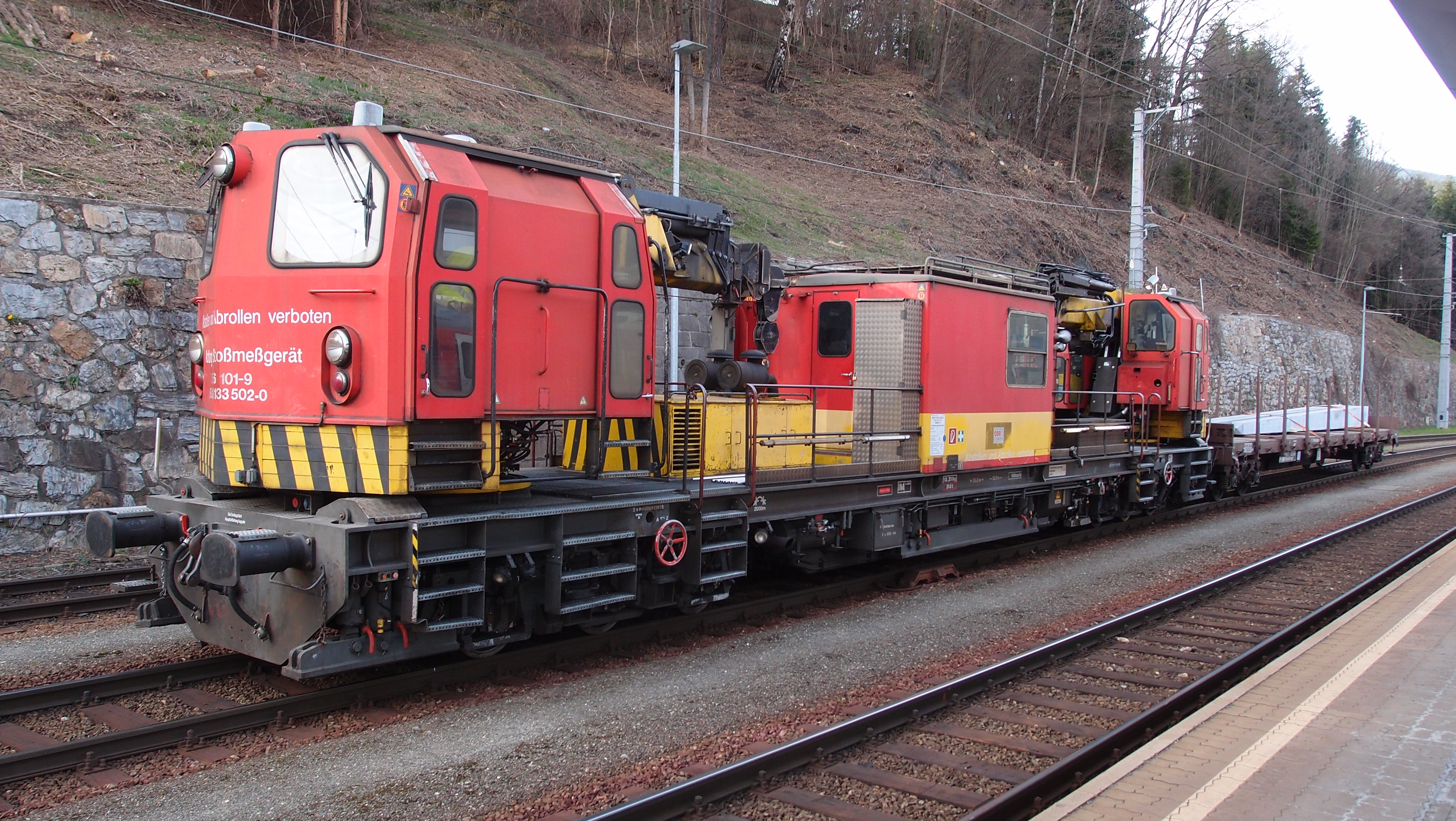
ÖBB Class X556.1

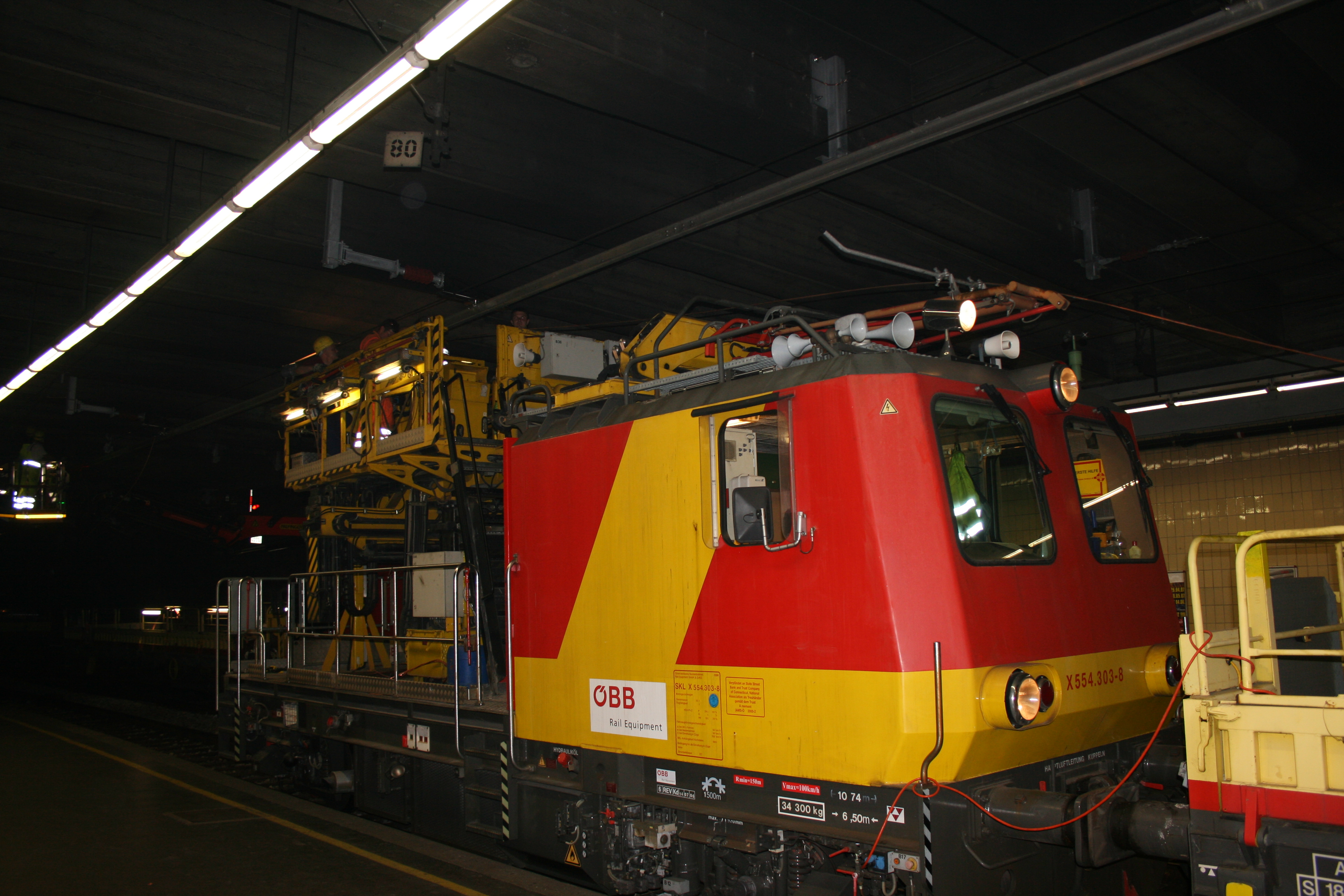
ÖBB Class X554.3

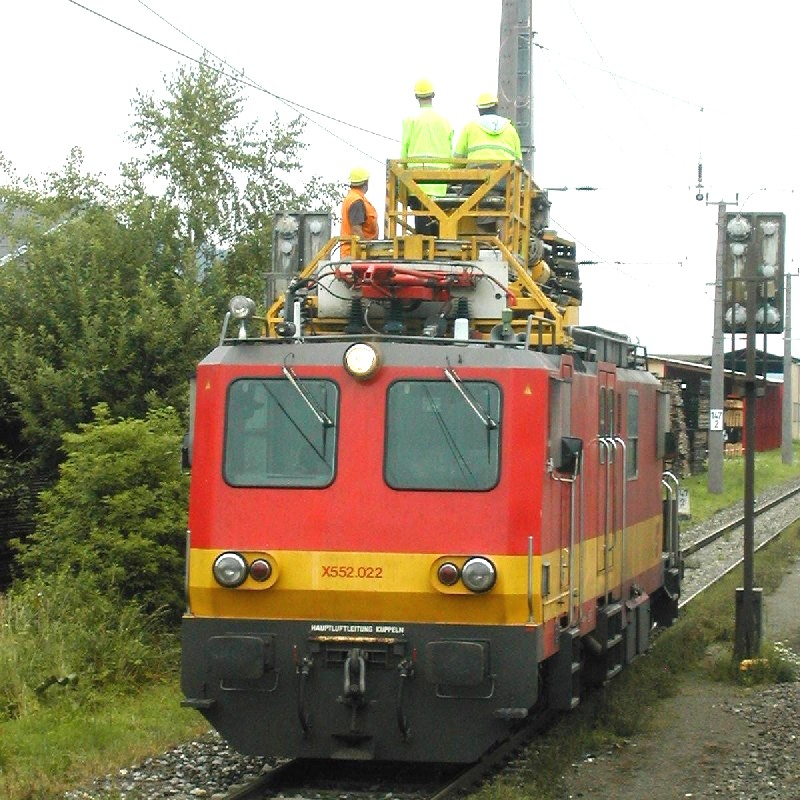
ÖBB Class X552

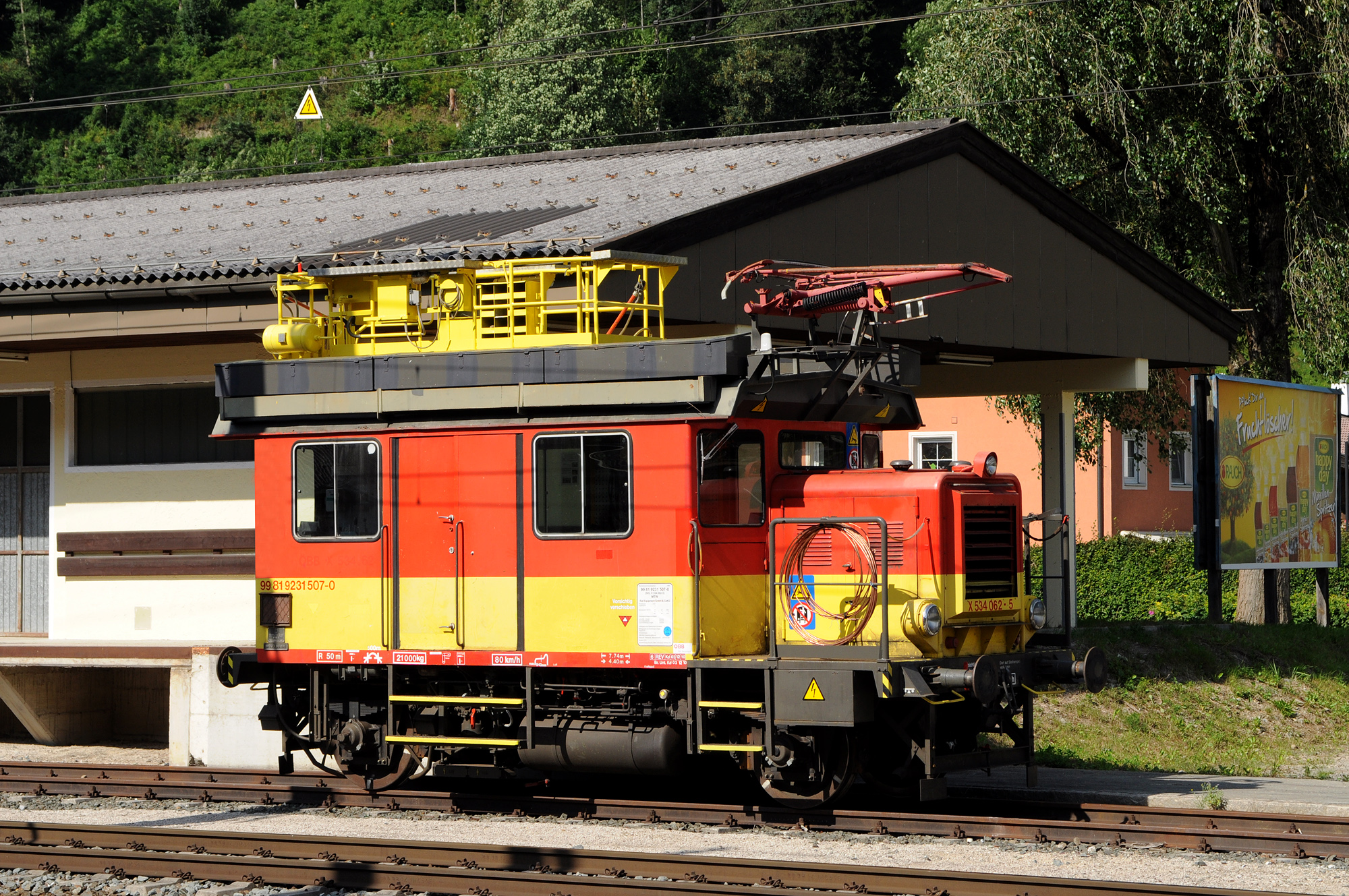
ÖBB Class X534

== See also ==
- Rail transport in Austria
- History of rail transport in Austria
- Imperial Austrian State Railways
- Nightjet – the overnight passenger train services of the ÖBB
- Rail transport in Liechtenstein – operated by ÖBB
- Railjet – the high-speed service of the ÖBB
- Transport in Austria
- List of European railways

=== Other railways in Austria ===
- Achenseebahn
- Pöstlingbergbahn
- Raaberbahn
- Schafbergbahn
- Schneebergbahn
- Zillertalbahn
