= Puster Valley Railway =

Railway line in South Tyrol, Italy

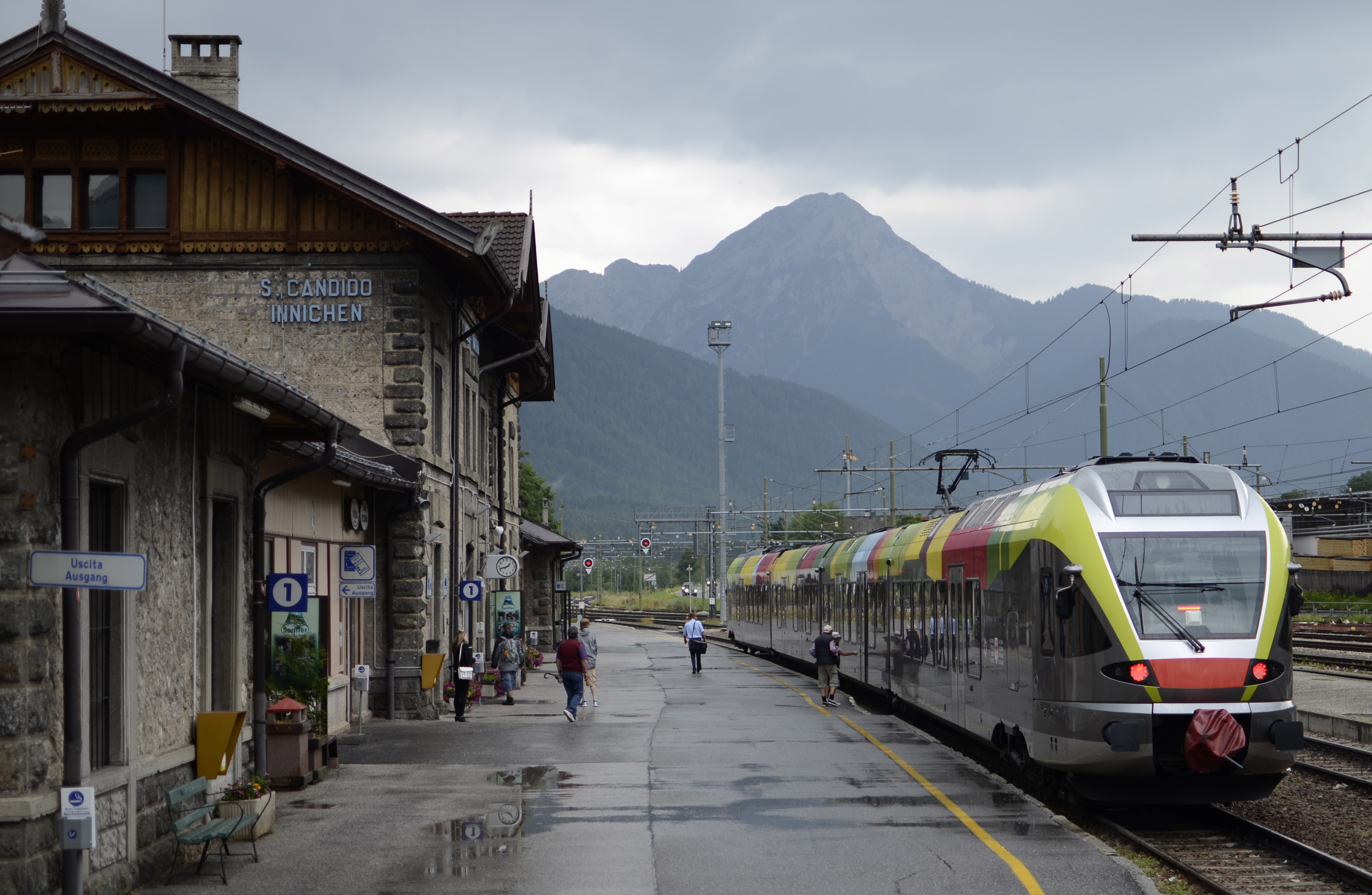
- Puster Valley Railway

Overview
- Other names: Franzensfeste–Innichen railway; Fortezza–San Candido railway
- Native name: Pustertalbahn
- Line number: 44
- Locale: South Tyrol, Italy
- Termini: Franzensfeste (Fortezza); Innichen (San Candido)

Service
- Route number: 210

History
- Opened: 20 November 1871

Technical
- Line length: 65 km (40 mi)
- Number of tracks: 1
- Track gauge: 1,435 mm (4 ft 8 1/2 in) standard gauge
- Electrification: 3 kV DC

The Puster Valley Railway (German: Pustertalbahn; Italian: Ferrovia della Val Pusteria) is a standard gauge, single-track railway line in the Puster Valley between Franzensfeste (Italian: Fortezza) and Innichen (San Candido), South Tyrol, Italy. The line branches off the Brenner Railway in Franzensfeste and runs via Bruneck and Toblach to Innichen, where it continues as the Drava Valley Railway (Drautalbahn).

Historically, there was no separation between the Puster Valley Railway and the Drava Valley Railway, as the granting of the concession, the construction and the commissioning of the line from Villach to Franzensfeste covered the whole line. However, since the transition between the Italian and Austrian electrification systems is now located in Innichen station, this is usually considered the terminus of the two lines. Alternatively, the national border east of Innichen or the Toblach saddle west of Innichen may be seen as the border between the two lines.

== History ==
As early as 1858, the Southern Railway Company (Südbahngesellschaft) developed its first plans and shortly afterwards received the building permit to connect, Vienna with the Tyrol via the Southern Railway (Südbahn).

The Hügel & Sager company was awarded the contract to construct the Puster Valley Railway and work began in the late autumn of 1869. As this proceeded much faster than expected, operations on the 20 km long Puster Valley Railway and Drava Valley Railway started on 20 November 1871. While the Drava Valley Railway from Villach to Lienz was built as a flat railway, it becomes a mountain railway on its continuation to Franzensfeste and reaches its highest point at the Toblach Saddle at about 1215 m above sea level.

An original task of the Puster Valley Railway was to connect East Tyrol to the capital of the Tyrol, Innsbruck. However, with the collapse of the Habsburg monarchy and the loss of South Tyrol to Italy after the end of the First World War, the importance of the railway declined sharply.

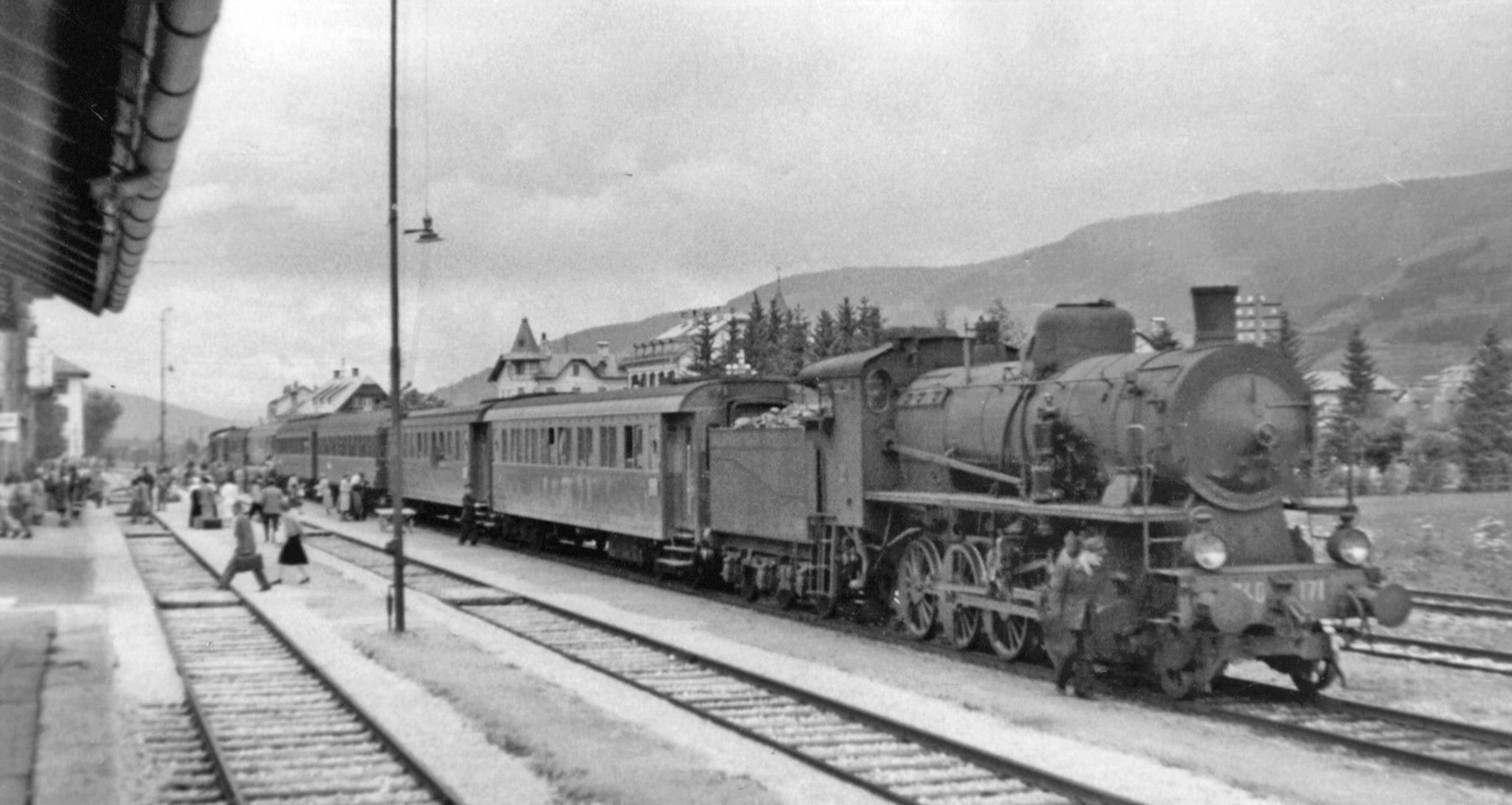
Steam operation in Toblach station (1954)

From 1985 to 1989, the Puster Valley Railway and the Drava Valley Railway were electrified on the basis of a treaty between Italy and Austria signed in 1984. At the same time, almost all viaducts were renewed and all tunnels were enlarged to allow electrical operation during two closures of the line in 1986 and 1988. Special efforts were required for the tunnel near Welsberg (Monguelfo), where, due to constant collapses, the entire ground cover of the 140 m long tunnel was removed and replaced after the construction of a new tunnel structure. While the Puster Valley Railway is equipped with the Italian electrical system (3 kV DC), the Drava Valley Railway is equipped with the Austrian electrical system (15 kV / 16.7 Hz AC). The voltage change point is located in Innichen station. While operations continued, electrical operations commenced at the timetable change on 28 May 1989. During the electrification in the Puster Valley, many crossings were replaced by underpasses. This involved tracks and embankment being removed during the night and prefabricated underpasses being inserted hydraulically. In addition, the trackwork and track base were reinforced and the station facilities were rebuilt. The purpose of the electrification was the relief of the Brenner Railway, with the intention of the Italian side to deliver up to ten pairs of freight trains a day including a rolling highway service to run on the Puster Valley Railway. This has never happened. In fact, the opposite happened, because while the Val Pusteria/Pustertal had previously been a well-used international express service on the Vienna South–Villach–Lienz–Franzensfeste–Innsbruck route, it was discontinued at the May 1996 timetable change, meaning there is no longer any cross-border long-distance traffic in the Puster Valley Railway.

Between 2008 and 2010, Südtiroler Transportstrukturen (South Tyrol transport infrastructure; STA), which coordinates transport in the province of South Tyrol, financed the total renovation of the Puster Valley Railway. The route was initially prepared by adapting the stations and the interlockings to support a half-hour cycle, which was introduced gradually up to December 2009. All stations were equipped with 55 cm high platforms and underpasses, enabling the time-saving, simultaneous entry of crossing trains. The remote-control signalling and passenger information systems were also brought up to date with the latest technology. Waiting rooms were also renewed, lifts built, station areas rearranged, eight new trains purchased, car and bicycle parking spaces were installed and two new stations were built: St. Lorenzen station was opened in December 2008 and Percha-Kronplatz station, which is directly connected to the Kronplatz ski resort by cable car, on 12 December 2010. As a result of these measures, the number of passengers tripled within five years (January–November 2006: 312,000 passengers; January–November 2011: 980,000 passengers).

The new Bruneck Nord station was opened near the hospital in October 2013. The new Vierschach station, which was connected by cable car to Helm and the associated ski resort, was opened in December 2014.

== Operations ==
Prior to electrification, steam-hauled trains were mainly operated, initially with locomotives from the Austrian Southern Railway Company, and from 1918 from Ferrovie dello Stato Italiane (FS). Class 740, 741 and 940 locomotives were common until the early 1980s. The use of diesel locomotives and diesel multiple units lasted only for a short time. After mixed electrical operations with a locomotive change in Innichen, only two-system Stadler Flirt articulated multiple units have been operated by SAD Nahverkehr (Südtiroler Automobildienst, "South Tyrol automotive service local transport") and FS. Between Franzensfeste and Innichen there is a 30 minute cycle during the day, and also on weekends during the winter season. Every second train continues to Lienz. In winter, the trains terminating in Innichen run to Sillian, but do not stop in Weitlanbrunn. Some trains are also connected to the Brenner Railway and continue to Merano.

== Freight traffic ==
The pairs of freight trains foreseen in the planning of the electrification did not materialise, but before the new Tarvisio–Udine railway (Pontebbana) was completed in the early 1990s, several empty freight trains ran daily. In addition, imports of the Fiat models, Panda, Cinquecento and Seicento, made in Poland were handled over the Puster Valley Railway. The line was only of particular importance for a short time when the Brenner Railway was closed, when almost a hundred freight and long-distance trains used the line.

Until 2009, there was only regular freight traffic between Bruneck and Franzensfeste. The trains, coming and going from Hall in Tirol, mostly ran in the mornings on certain days of the week. There has been no freight traffic on the Puster Valley Railway since 2012.

== Plans ==
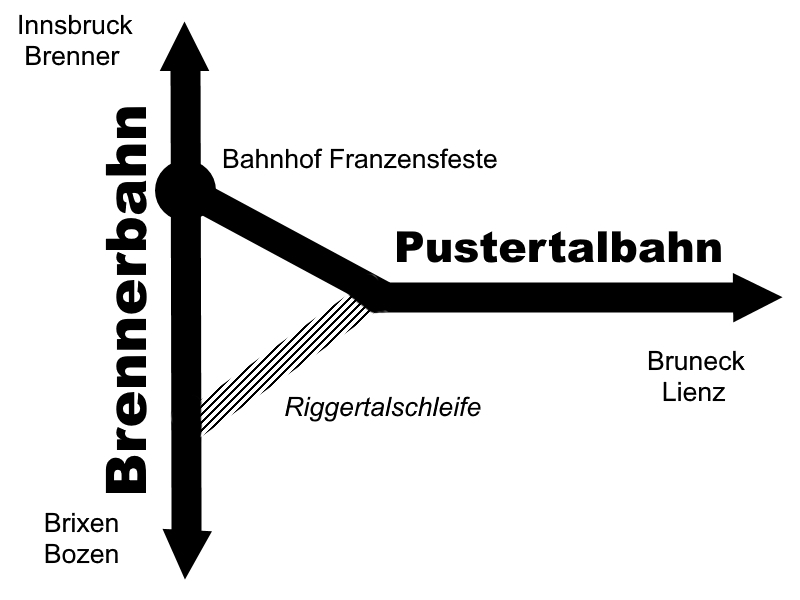
Schematic graphic of the Rigger Valley Link

The Rigger Valley Link project has been long discussed: after leaving the Puster Valley, the Puster Valley Railway currently swings north into the Wipp Valley and ends at Franzensfeste station, meaning that passengers travelling towards Brixen and Bolzano have to change to a southbound train. In order to save the majority of passengers having to detour and change trains, there is a proposal for an additional line is in the area, where the Rigger Valley (a short section of the valley of the Eisack) would be crossed by a bridge and the trains from the Puster Valley would no longer exclusively head for Franzensfeste, but some would head south of Brixen. This measure would significantly shorten the travel time from Bruneck to Brixen and Bolzano. €49 million was earmarked for the Rigger Valley Link in the operational plan of the European Cohesion Fund on 1 December 2016.

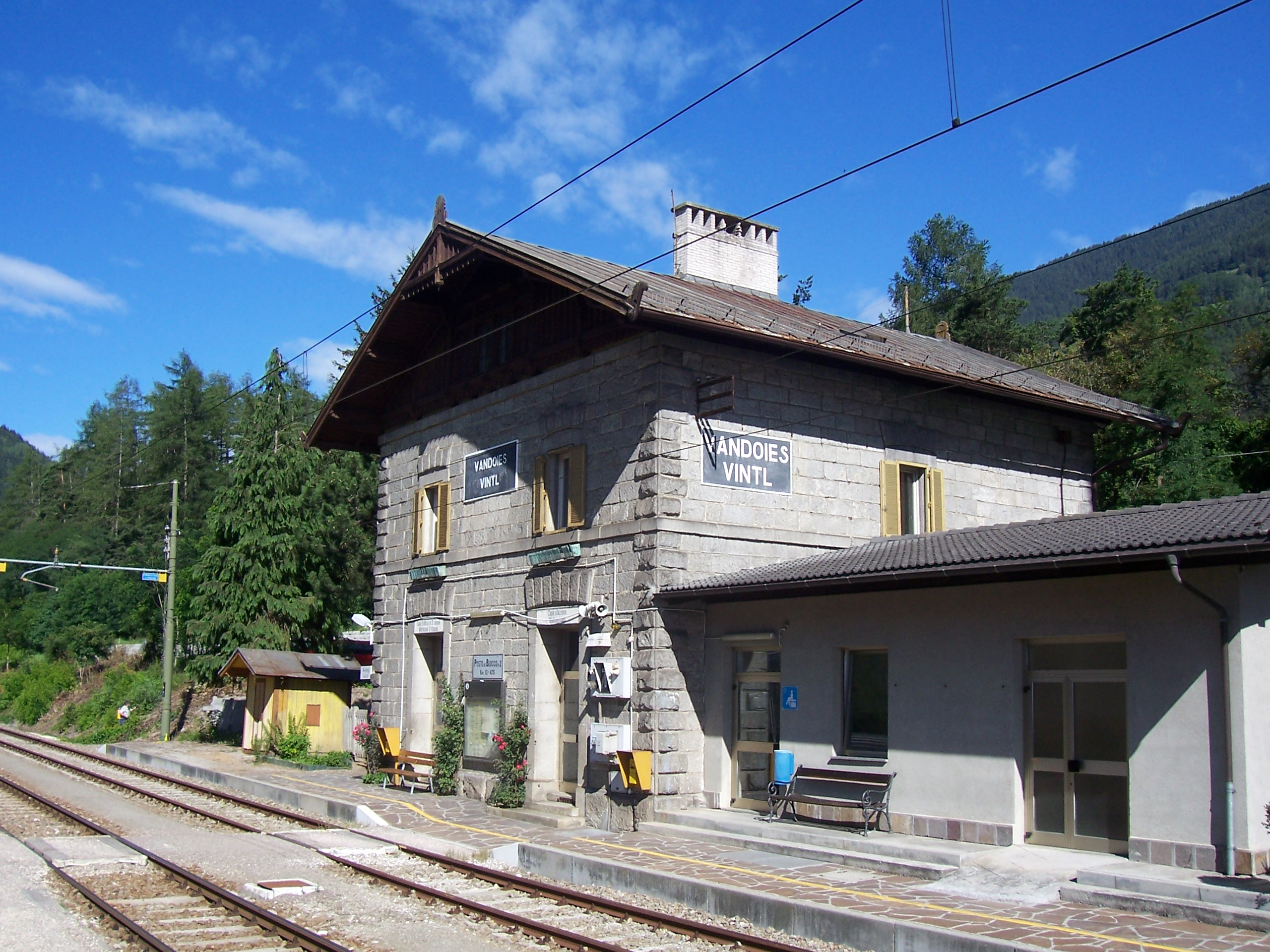
Vintl station

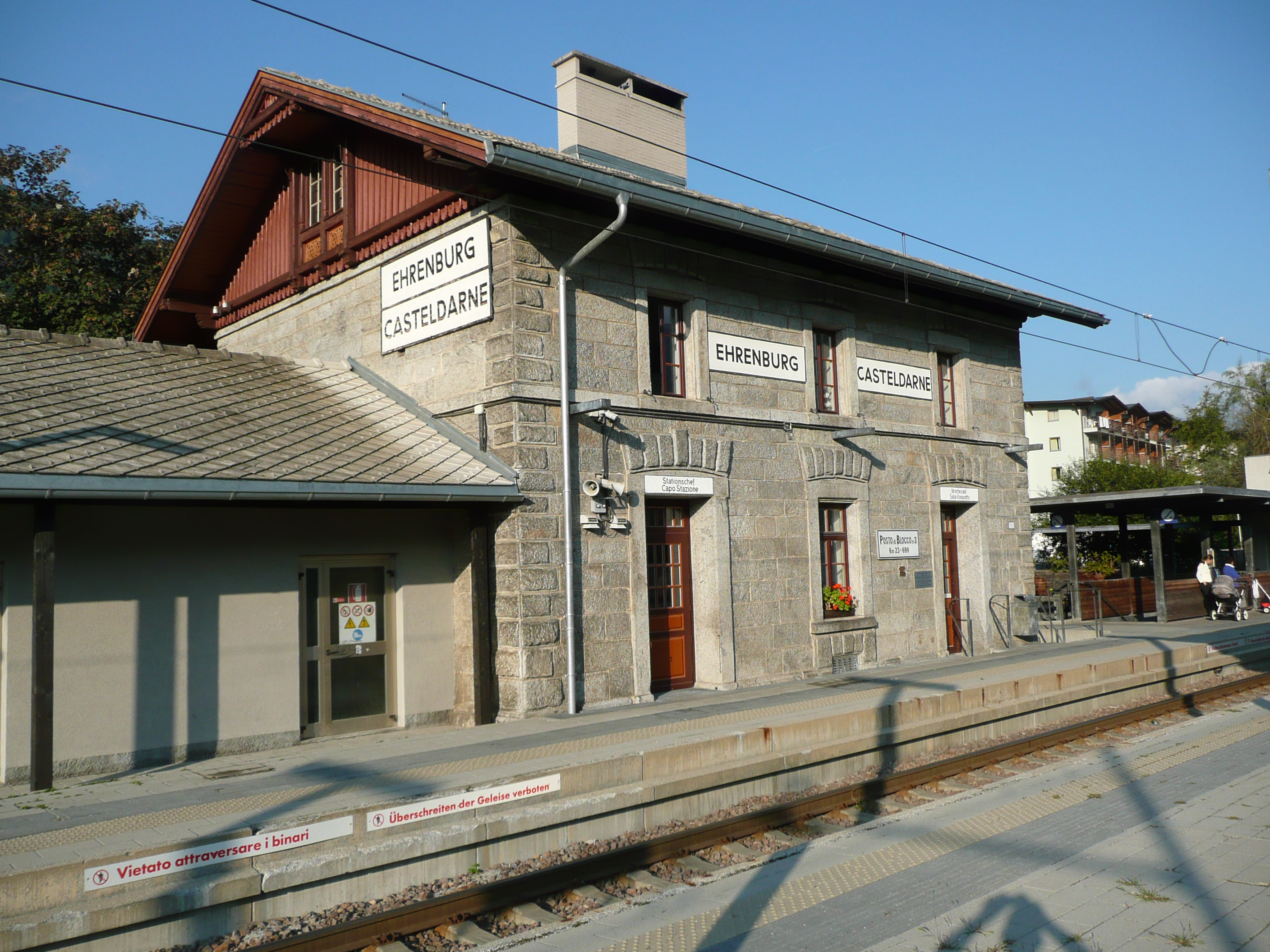
Ehrenburg station

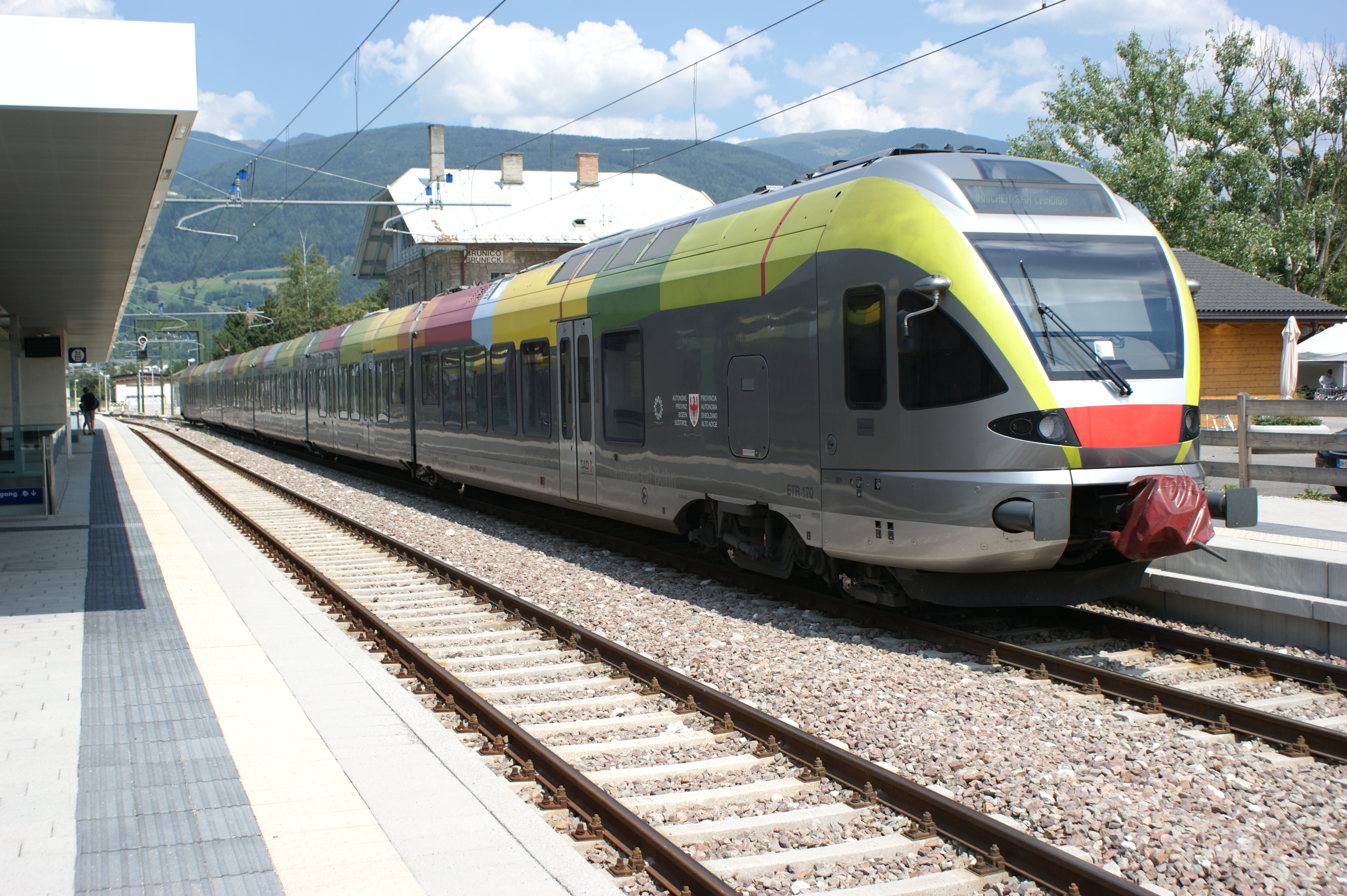
Stadler Flirt in Bruneck
