= Innichen railway station =

Railway station in Innichen, Italy

San Candido–Innichen
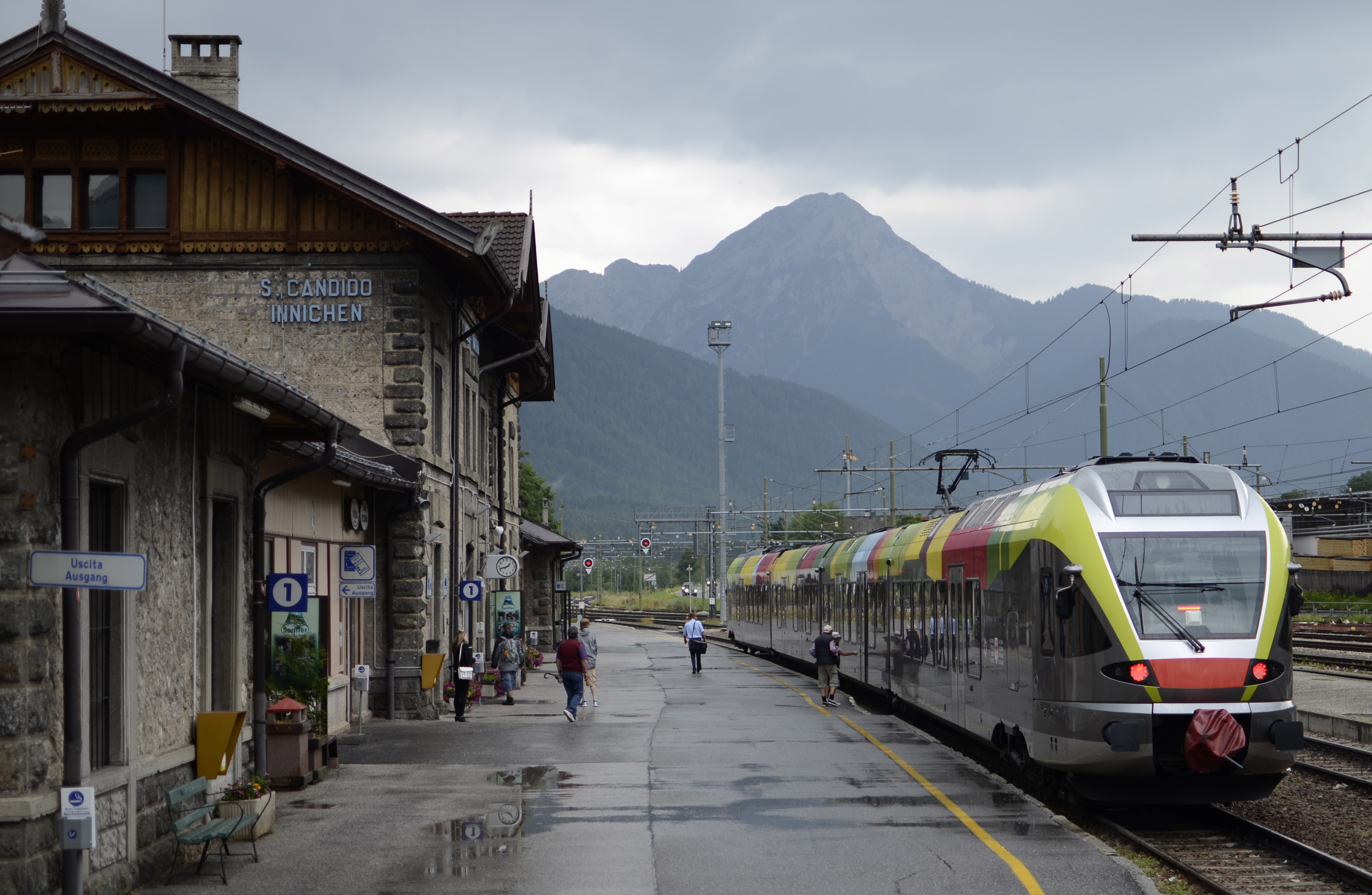
- Stadler Flirt in front of the station building

General information
- Location: Via Stazione, 1 Innichen, South Tyrol, Italy
- Coordinates: 46°43′57″N 12°16′20″E
- Operator: Rete Ferroviaria Italiana
- Lines: Puster Valley Railway; Drava Valley Railway
- Tracks: 10
- Train operators: Trenitalia

Construction
- Architect: Wilhelm von Flattich

Other information
- Classification: Silver

History
- Opened: 1871; 155 years ago
- Electrified: 1989; 37 years ago
Location
- Location within South Tyrol Location within Italy

Innichen station (Italian: stazione di San Candido) is a railway station located in Innichen (San Candido), Italy where the Puster Valley Railway and the Drava Valley Railway meet in eastern South Tyrol. It is the border station between Italy and Austria.

== Location ==
The station is located to the east of the Toblach saddle in the Hochpustertal (High Puster Valley) at an altitude of 1176 m. It is located on the western outskirts of Innichen adjacent to national highway 49. It is about 7 km west of the border with Austria.

== History ==
The station was opened in 1871 together with the Puster Valley Railway and the Drava Valley Railway, which were operated by the Southern Railway Company (Südbahngesellschaft). In the 1920s, 1960s and 1980s, Ferrovie dello Stato built additional buildings, including a residential building designed by Angiolo Mazzoni. Between 1985 and 1989, Ferrovie dello Stato electrified the Puster Valley Railway from Innichen west to Franzensfeste at 3 kV DC, while the ÖBB electrified the Drava Valley Railway from Innichen east to Lienz at 15 kV 16.7 Hz AC.

Since the station is some distance from the centre of the town, it is proposed to relocate it to the east, closer to the centre of the town. A master plan for the project was commissioned by Südtiroler Transportstrukturen (South Tyrol transport facilities) and presented in 2013.

== Buildings ==
The station building, designed by Wilhelm von Flattich, has a central structure built in conglomerate and has granite bossage. The two-story main wing is complemented by two single-story extensions. The gables are made of wood. There is a spacious warehouse on the east side and a hexagonal water supply facility on the west side.

The buildings have been heritage-listed since 2004.

== Role ==
In operational terms, the Innichen station was originally designed as a minor station. However, due to the electrification of the Drava and Puster Valley Railways with different electrical systems in the 1980s, it actually became a double terminus. For years, the system change point between the Italian and Austrian networks could only be passed without changing locomotives by specially acquired ÖBB class 1822 corridor trains. Only the acquisition of Stadler Flirt multi-system multiple units by the state of South Tyrol in 2013, allowed continuous regional services between South Tyrol and East Tyrol to be re-established.

Innichen station is served by services operated by Trenitalia and SAD Nahverkehr (Südtiroler Automobildienst, "South Tyrol automotive service local transport"), which also operates bus services to the station.
