= Drava Valley Railway =

Railway line in Europe

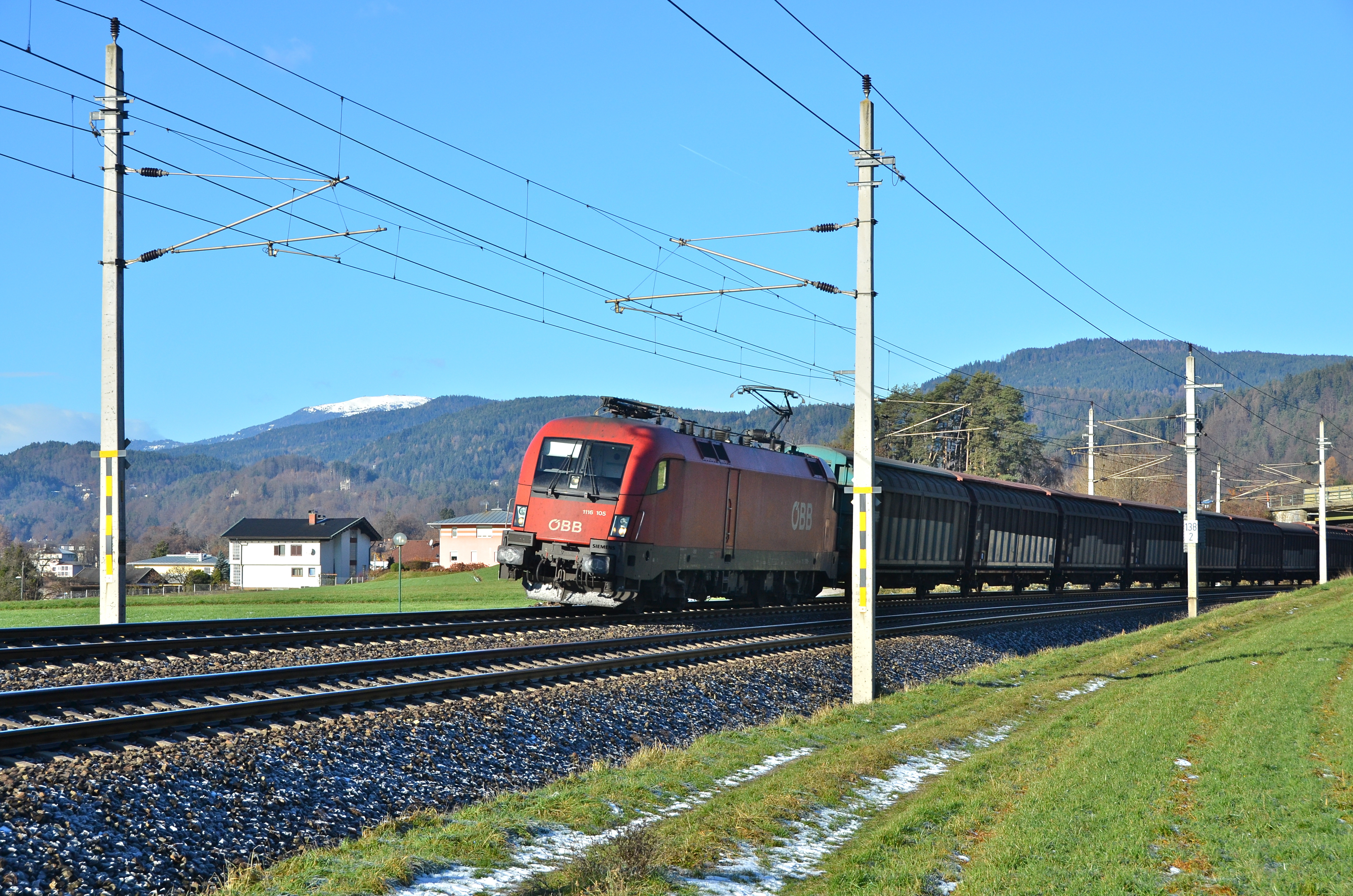
- Drava Valley Railway

Overview
- Native name: Drautalbahn
- Line number: 423 01 national border near Bleiburg–Bleiburg; 410 01 Bleiburg–Klagenfurt Hbf; 413 01 Klagenfurt Hbf–Villach Hbf; 222 01 Villach Hbf– Pusarnitz-Süd junction; 407 01 Pusarnitz-Süd junction–national border near Sillian

Service
- Route number: 620 Bleiburg–Klagenfurt; 220 Salzburg Hbf–Klagenfurt Hbf; 223 Spittal-Millstättersee–Innichen

History
- Opened: 1 June 1863

Technical
- Line length: 311 km (193 mi)
- Number of tracks: 1 or 2
- Track gauge: 1,435 mm (4 ft 8 1/2 in) standard gauge
- Minimum radius: 266 m (873 ft)
- Electrification: Klagenfurt Hbf–Innichen: 15 kV 16.7 Hz AC
- Operating speed: 140 km/h (87 mph) (max)
- Maximum incline: 2.73%

The Drava Valley Railway (German: Drautalbahn) is an east–west railway running along the Drava. It runs from Maribor (where it connects with the Spielfeld-Straß–Trieste railway, formerly part of the old Southern Railway—Südbahn) to Innichen, where it merges into the Puster Valley Railway (German: Pustertalbahn; Italian: Ferrovia della Val Pusteria) to Franzensfeste (Fortezza). It starts in northern Slovenia, crosses Carinthia and East Tyrol and ends in South Tyrol. The Klagenfurt–Bleiburg section has been rebuilt as part of the Koralm Railway, which follows the Jaun Valley Railway (Jauntalbahn) from Bleiburg. The line in Slovenia and the Austrian section around Bleiburg has one track and is unelectrified; the expanded Koralm section has double track and is electrified, as is its westwards continuation to Lendorf; from Lendorf to the Italian border it is again single track and electrified, changing electrification at the Italian border for the final stretch to Franzensfeste.

== History ==
The line now called the Drava Valley Railway consists of the Carinthian Railway (Maribor–Villach), the original Drava Valley Railway (Villach–Lienz) and the eastern part of the original Puster Valley Railway (which extended from Lienz to Franzensfeste). It received its current name as a result of the division of the Puster Valley Railway into an Austrian and an Italian part after 1918.

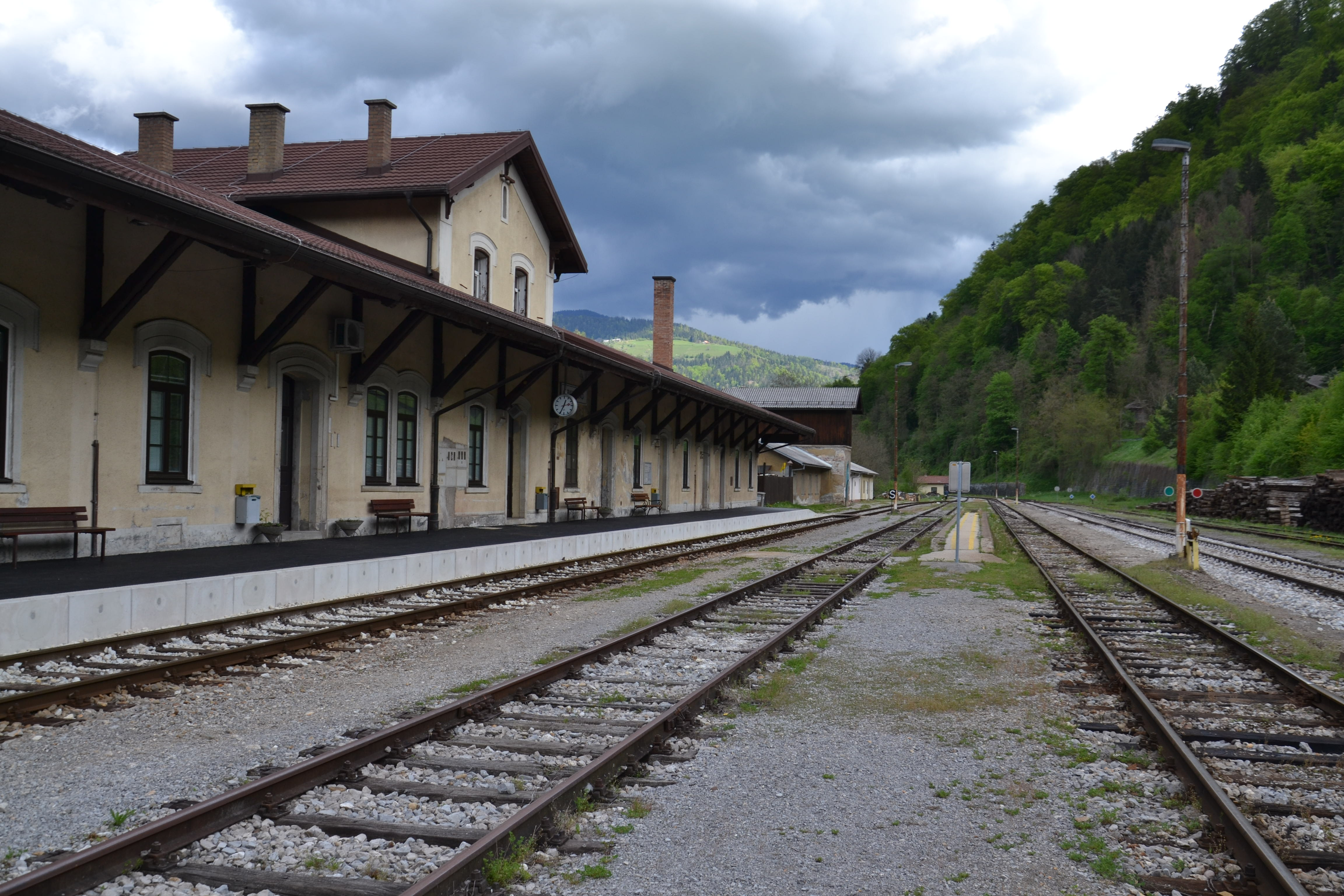
Dravograd station

=== Carinthian Railway ===
The Carinthian Railway (Kärntner Bahn) was built as a branch line by the k.k. Priv. Südbahngesellschaft (Imperial–royal, "privileged"—by the grant of a concession—Southern Railway Company) and extended from Maribor (then officially referred to under its German name of Marburg) to Villach.

The original concession (1856: Maribor–Villach–Brixen with a Villach–Gorizia—branch) was held by another company, which, however, could not raise the capital to build this large project. It still held the concession at the groundbreaking ceremony in Klagenfurt in 1857.

This concession then passed to Creditanstalt, which passed part of it (Maribor–Villach) on to the Southern Railway Company. The remaining projects were dropped for the time being. The section from Maribor to Klagenfurt was opened on 1 June 1863. The line was then opened to Villach on 30 May 1864.

The line was electrified and double-tracked between Klagenfurt and Villach in the 1960s.

=== Old Drava Valley Railway; Puster Valley Railway ===
An extension was not initially considered. It was only because of political and strategic considerations that the decision was made later to build a connection from Villach via Lienz to Franzensfeste to establish a link between the Southern Railway and the Brenner Railway. This was done with the construction of the old Drava Valley Railway and the Puster Valley Railway, both of which were opened on 20 November 1871. The Villach–Franzensfeste section was built with financial support from the state.

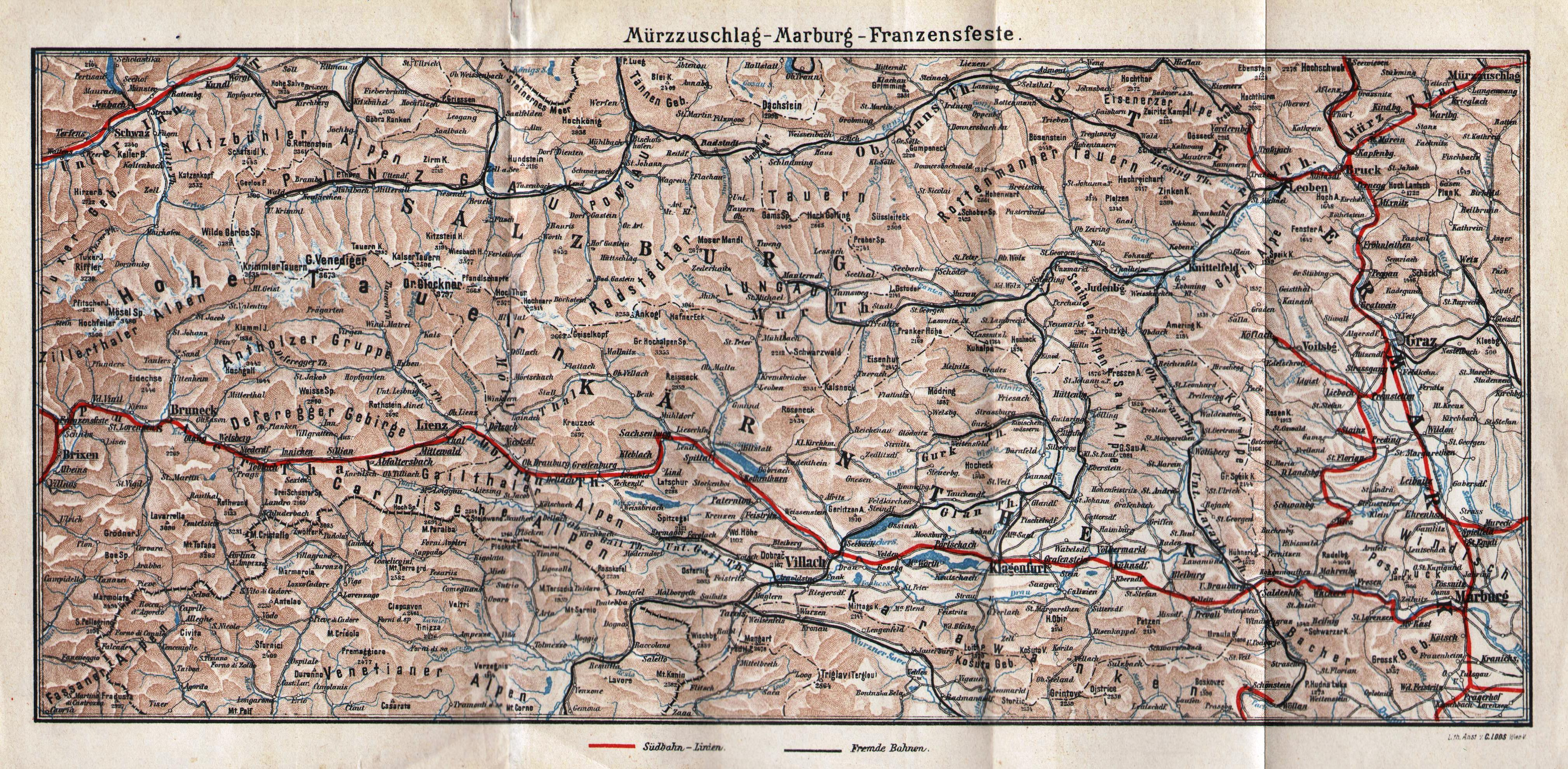
Drava Valley Railway between Maribor (bottom right) and Franzensfeste, 1899

=== Reorientation after 1918 ===
After the collapse of the Habsburg monarchy, the line suddenly lay in three different states and thus lost its historical unity. With the division of the Puster Valley Railway, its Austrian section was merged with the old Drava Valley Railway and the Carinthian Railway to form the current Drava Valley Railway, while the Italian Puster Valley Railway kept its name. The Austrian section still ends a few kilometres from Maribor. Between the junction with the Rosen Valley Railway in Klagenfurt and the junction with the Rudolf Railway towards Tarvisio in Villach, it became part of the new southern line.

Since the junction with the Lavant Valley Railway (Lavanttalbahn) was in Dravograd (Unterdrauburg) in Slovenia, trains between the Jaun Valley and Klagenfurt had to run as transit traffic until the Jaun Valley Railway (Jauntalbahn), which provides a route through Austria, was built in the 1960s.

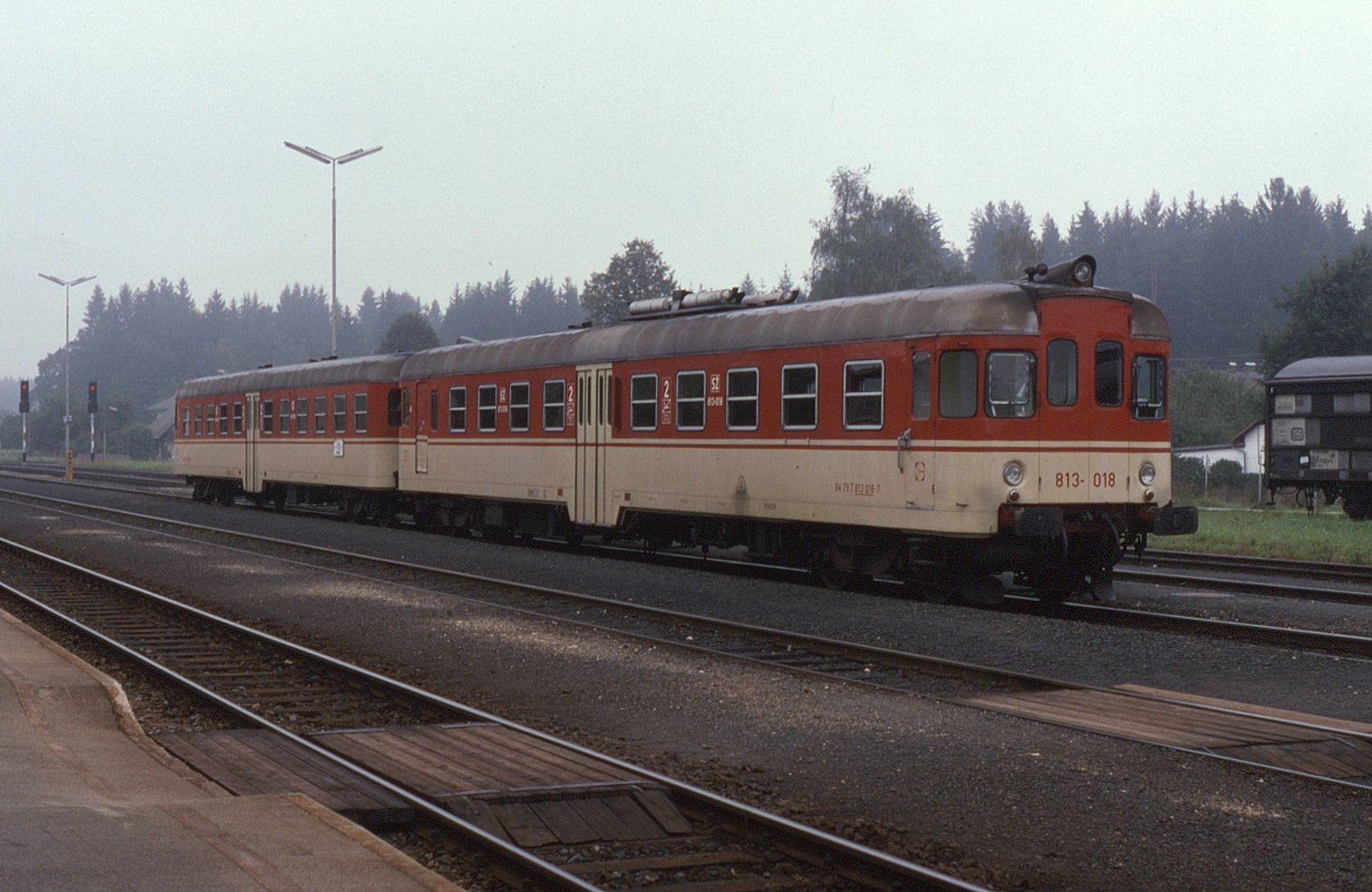
Railcar 813.018 in Bleiburg

== Passenger services and rolling stock ==
Services of the Slovenian Railways run on the Slovenian section from Monday to Friday. There is comparatively dense traffic between Maribor and Ruše. Three pairs of trains run as far as Bleiburg. Some trains run as far as Prevalje. Very few regional trains run on weekends in the summer months. Services are mostly operated with class SZ813/814 railcars, which were built between 1973 and 1976 by Fiat Ferroviaria and TVT Maribor.

Services operate from Bleiburg to Klagenfurt Hauptbahnhof, many originating in Wolfsberg. Services are operated by push-pull trains powered by class 2016 locomotives or class 5022 diesel multiple units.

ÖBB long-distance services on the Vienna–Villach, Vienna–Lienz and Klagenfurt–Salzburg routes are also operated on the Klagenfurt–Spittal an der Drau section. These RJ, EC, IC or EN services are pulled or pushed by class 1144, 1116 and 1216 locomotives. Modern railcars of class 4024 are also operated as REX, R or S-Bahn services on the electrified section.

Until the 2013/14 timetable change, there were two daily ÖBB direct connections from Lienz to Innsbruck, which were run as transit trains over the Puster Valley Railway and the Brenner Railway and were hauled by class 1216 locomotives.

Since the 2014/15 timetable change, fourteen FLIRT trains have been running every hour from Lienz to Franzensfeste, with interchange to services to Innsbruck or Bolzano (Bozen). The six-part ETR170 sets are equipped for operation under 3 kV DC (Italy) and 15 kV/16.7 Hz AC (Austria).
