= Franzensfeste railway station =

Railway station in South Tyrol, Italy

Fortezza–Franzensfeste
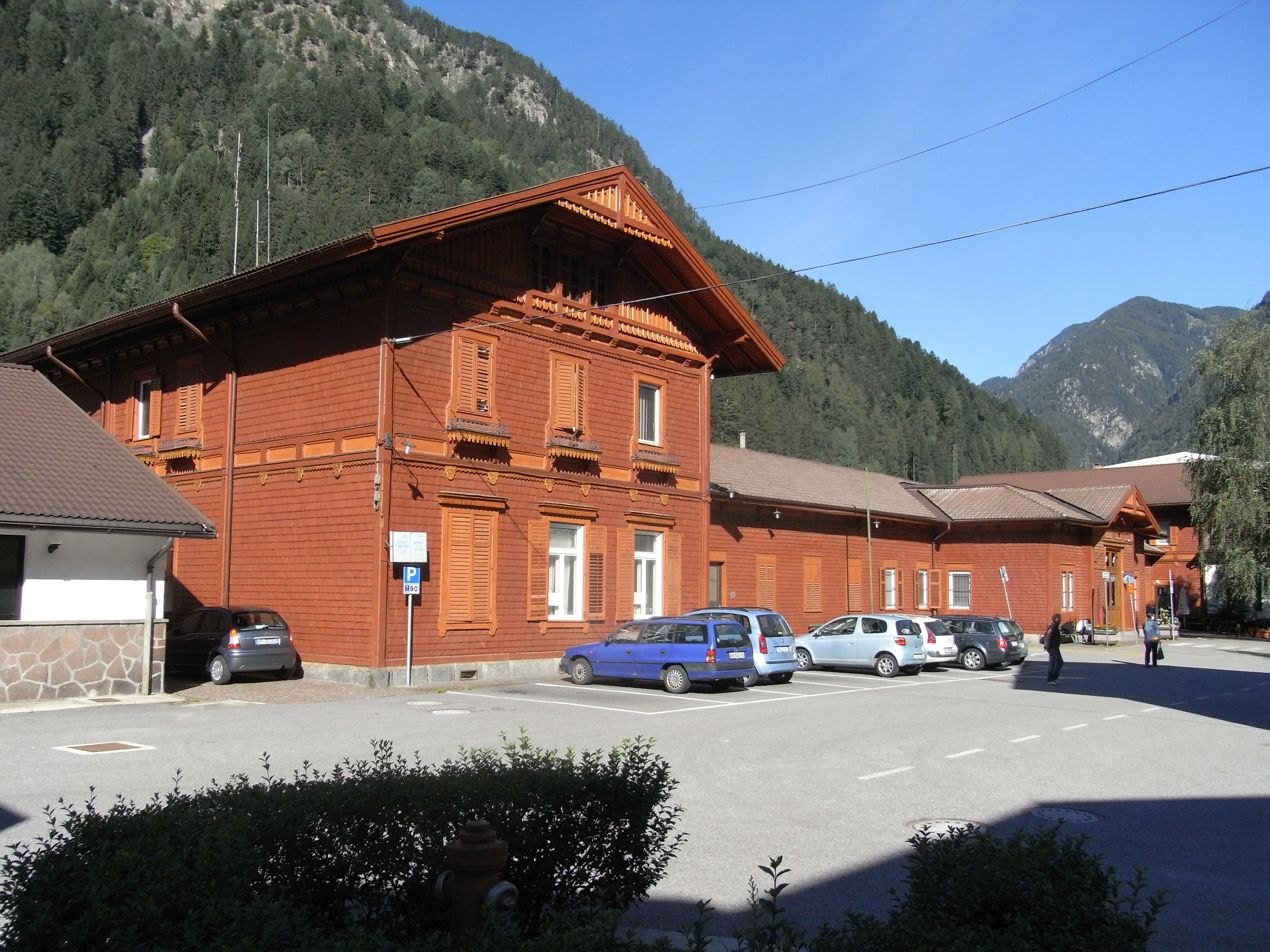

General information
- Location: Piazza Stazione, 3 Franzensfeste, South Tyrol, Italy
- Coordinates: 46°47′20″N 11°36′37″E
- Operator: Rete Ferroviaria Italiana
- Lines: Brenner Railway; Puster Valley Railway
- Tracks: 3
- Train operators: Trenitalia

Construction
- Architect: Wilhelm von Flattich

Other information
- Classification: Silver

History
- Opened: 24 August 1867; 159 years ago
- Electrified: 1935; 91 years ago
Location
- Location within South Tyrol Location within Italy

Franzensfeste station (Italian: stazione di Fortezza) is a railway station located on the Brenner Railway and the western terminus of the Puster Valley Railway. It serves the town of Franzensfeste (Fortezza).

== History ==
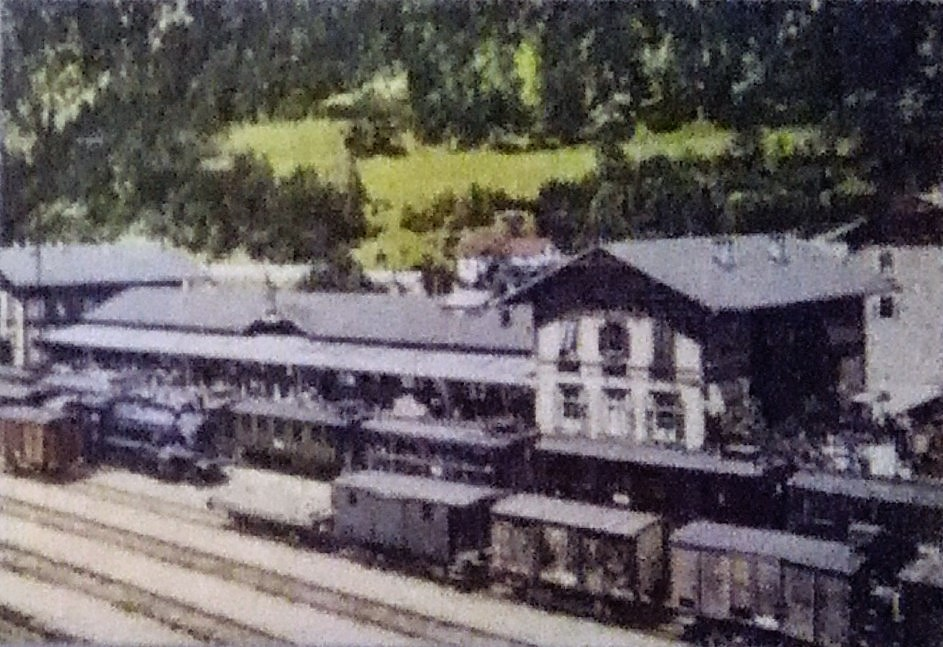
Franzensfeste station in 1912

The original Franzensfeste station, which was opened in 1867 at the same time as the Brenner Railway, had a small timber station building built on a granite base with a cross-shaped plan, suitable for housing the waiting room and the office on the ground floor, while in the attic there was an apartment for the use of railway staff.

Two timber residences were built in the northern and southern sectors of the station area for track maintenance staff, while a building containing the water tanks used to supply the steam locomotives was placed to the west of the passenger building, on the other side of the tracks. The building also included a loading ramp with an adjoining timber goods shed.

The decision to build buildings with such light structures was dictated by the fact that, as the station area bordered the Franzensfeste Fortress, they could not be built in a way that might provide shelter for any attackers.

The station played a very important role in making Franzensfeste grow, and its importance grew further when, between 1869 and 1871, the Puster Valley Railway (at the time called the Marburg–Franzensfeste railway) was built: this meant that the station building had to be rebuilt. The result was a long building, consisting of three main sections (one central and two on each side), aligned and connected by two low corridors: in the central building there were waiting rooms, luggage storage and a ticket office, in the south wing there were a post office and the apartments of the station master and the manager of the three restaurants (one for each class of travel), which were opened in the north wing. The kitchens and toilets were placed in two independent huts on the north side.

The administrative and technical buildings were also enlarged: a building was built to the south of the station building to house the station signal box. The goods shed was demolished and rebuilt as a larger shed further south, while a coal depot and other buildings were added to the north of the water tanks for the use of railway staff and coal miners. A locomotive depot and staff toilets were built to the north. Finally, two other signal boxes, a workshop and a store for fire-fighting materials were added on the north side of the station area.

This expansion was accompanied by an increase in the station staff, making it necessary to build three three-storey apartment buildings. The Reifer hotel was also built to serve passengers.

After the First World War, which was followed by the annexation of South Tyrol by Italy, the Fortezza station also became a customs post; in 1924 the station was expanded with new parking tracks, loading ramps, freight depots and a new brick shed for locomotives. To enable these works, it was necessary to excavate part of the rocky slope on the west side of the site and work was carried out to adapt various other pieces of infrastructure. The influx of railway workers, customs workers and transport businesses (for whom the architect Angiolo Mazzoni designed additional residences, located on the current national highway 12) led to an increase in the population of Fortezza, which became an autonomous municipality in 1940. An air raid hit the station on 20 April 1945, seriously damaging the customs warehouse and the locomotive shed.

In the 1950s, four marshalling yards were added and the water tanks and the coal depot, now unused, were demolished: the space left free allowed for an expansion of the customs facilities. These were closed at the end of the twentieth century with the introduction of free movement of people and goods within the borders of the European Union. This, combined with the reduction in freight traffic volumes, left vast areas of the station area unused.

The station is to undergo further works and infrastructural upgrades in preparation for the construction of the southern outlet of the Brenner Base Tunnel.

== Buildings and infrastructure ==
The timber station building built in 1871 has kept its original structure almost unchanged (except for the interiors, which have been heavily remodeled, and some external additions). This makes it unique, both on the Brenner Railway and the Puster Valley Railway. Inside it houses the ticket office and the office of the station master, one of whom is always on duty, and a bar-restaurant.

The goods yard, the signal boxes that are located in the station area and the residences for railway workers also retain their original appearance. The locomotive shed, damaged in air raids during the Second World War, was rebuilt and restored to its original appearance after the war.

The building complex also consists of a building used as an administrative centre, goods warehouse and customs house, built in the 1950s next to the northern section of the station building. The station master's building, adjacent to the south end of the station building, and a locomotive workshop, on the other hand, date to 1985. In the 1960s some covered loading ramps were built, together with more warehouses and workshops.

The buildings that originally housed the customs and administration offices located between the station building and the north signal box are unused, as are much of the infrastructure dedicated to freight traffic (which has been dismantled over time) and the former staff dormitory. The staff apartments were sold and converted into private homes.

In 1875, 88 people were employed in this station distributed in different sectors including engine servicing, maintenance, postal operations and catering.

== Rail services ==
The station is served by regional express and regional stopping trains of Trenitalia and SAD Nahverkehr (Südtiroler Automobildienst, "South Tyrol automotive service local transport"), as well as by long-distance connections (such as EuroCity services), operated by Trenitalia, ÖBB and DB.

== Services ==
The station has:

- ticket machines
- waiting room
- toilets

== Connections ==
Adjacent to the station there is a stop for urban and interurban bus routes.

- bus stop
- taxi rank
