= Hotel Imperial, Opatija =

Hotel in Opatija, Croatia

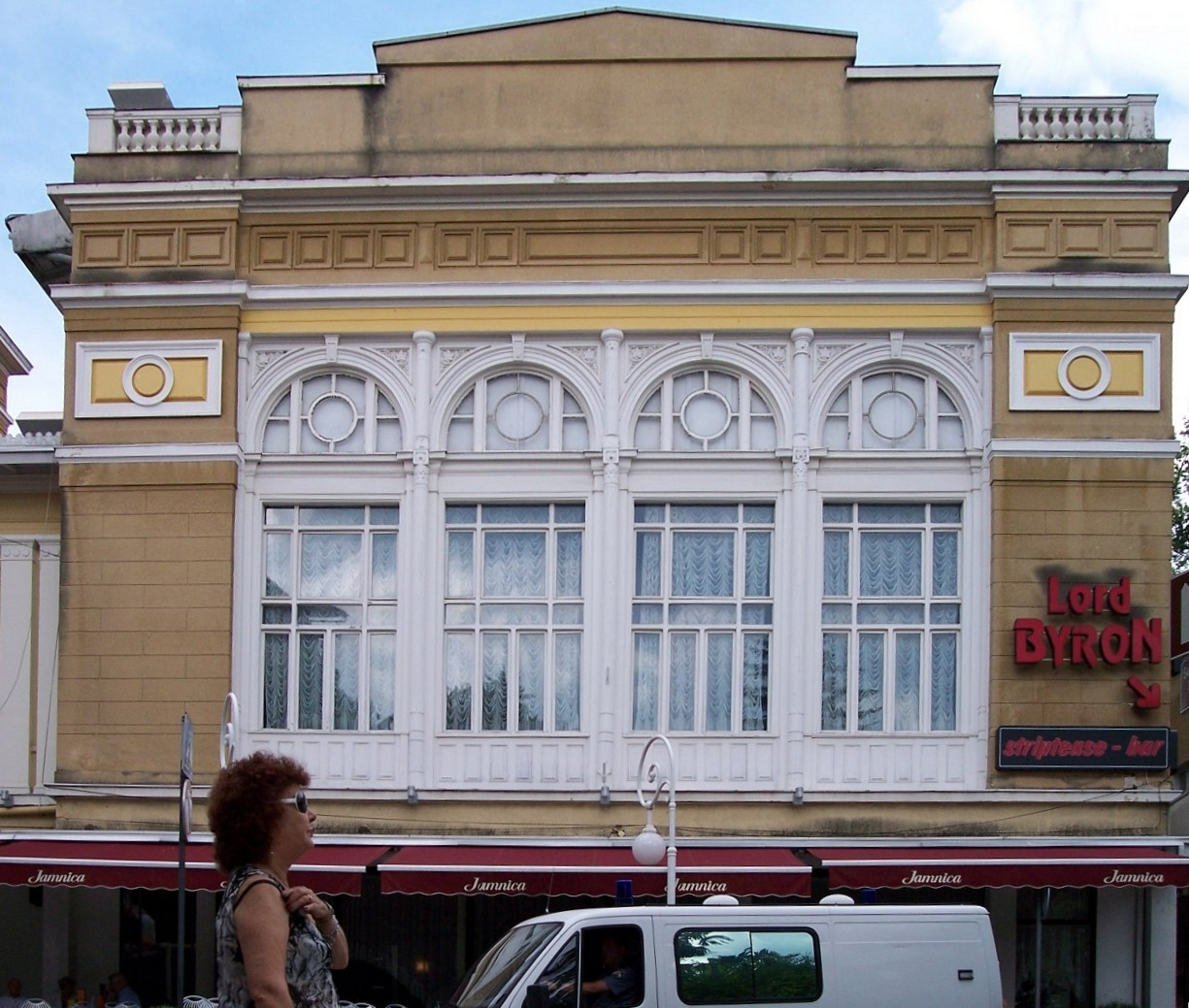
- Interactive map of the Hotel Imperial, Opatija area

General information
- Location: Opatija, Croatia
- Coordinates: 45°20′04″N 14°18′20″E
- Opened: 1885

Hotel Imperial is a hotel in Opatija and was the second hotel on the Adriatic coast. It opened in 1885 and is built in the Art Nouveau style.

== History ==
Hotel Imperial was built in 1884-85. It was constructed by the Austrian Southern Railway Company as a means to increase regional use of the railway. Other projects designed to increase railway use in Opatija were the first hotel of the area, Hotel Quarnero (Kvarner), the town's promenade and several parks. These projects turned Opatija into a successful early tourism centre in Austria-Hungary, which declared the region the empire's first "climactic seaside resort".

== Sources ==
- MacDonald, Katie; Schumann, Kyle (2020). "Villaggio Eni: Enrico Matteri and Edoardo Gellner build a new Italy". In Bea Jones, Kay; Pilat, Stephanie (eds.). The Routledge Companion to Italian Fascist Architecture: Reception and Legacy. Routledge. ISBN 978-1000061444.
