= Wipptal =

Valley in Austria and Italy

Coordinates: 47°N 11.5°E

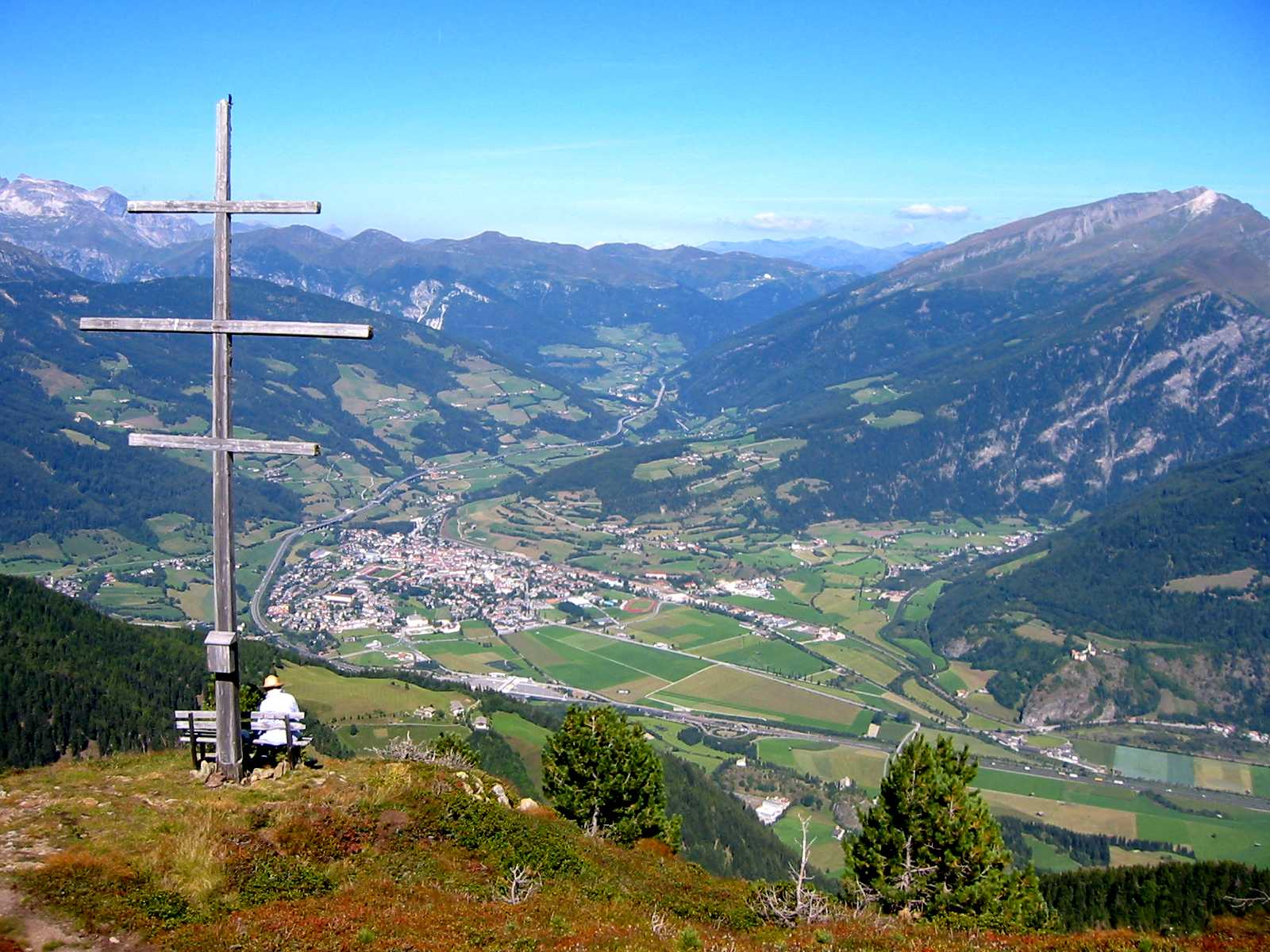
A view over Sterzing in September 2004

The Wipp Valley (German: Wipptal) is an Alpine valley in Tyrol, Austria and in South Tyrol, Italy, running between Innsbruck and Franzensfeste. The Brenner Pass (1,374 m) at the Austro-Italian border divides it into the northern, Austrian Lower Wipp Valley (Unteres Wipptal) and the southern, Italian Upper Wipp Valley (Oberes Wipptal). The Lower Wipp Valley extends along the Sill River southward from Innsbruck, where the Sill meets the larger Inn River, up to the Brenner Pass. South of the border, the Upper Wipp Valley stretches along the Eisack River by way of Sterzing to Franzensfeste. It forms the Wipptal District of the province of South Tyrol.

The Brenner Autobahn (motorway) (A13 in Austria, A22 in Italy) passes through the valley, beginning with the Europa Bridge near Innsbruck. It is an important road connection across the Alps, forming part of the connection between Munich and Verona. The inhabitants of the Wipp Valley have been complaining for years about the volume of traffic. The Brenner railway also runs through the valley. The proposed Brenner Base Tunnel would remove all long-distance trains from the valley.

Wipptal was politically and culturally united in the County of Tyrol and the Roman Catholic Diocese of Bolzano-Brixen up to the Treaty of St Germain in 1920.
