= Franzensfeste Fortress =

Fortress in South Tyrol, Italy

- Forte di Fortezza / Festung Franzensfeste
- South Tyrol, Italy
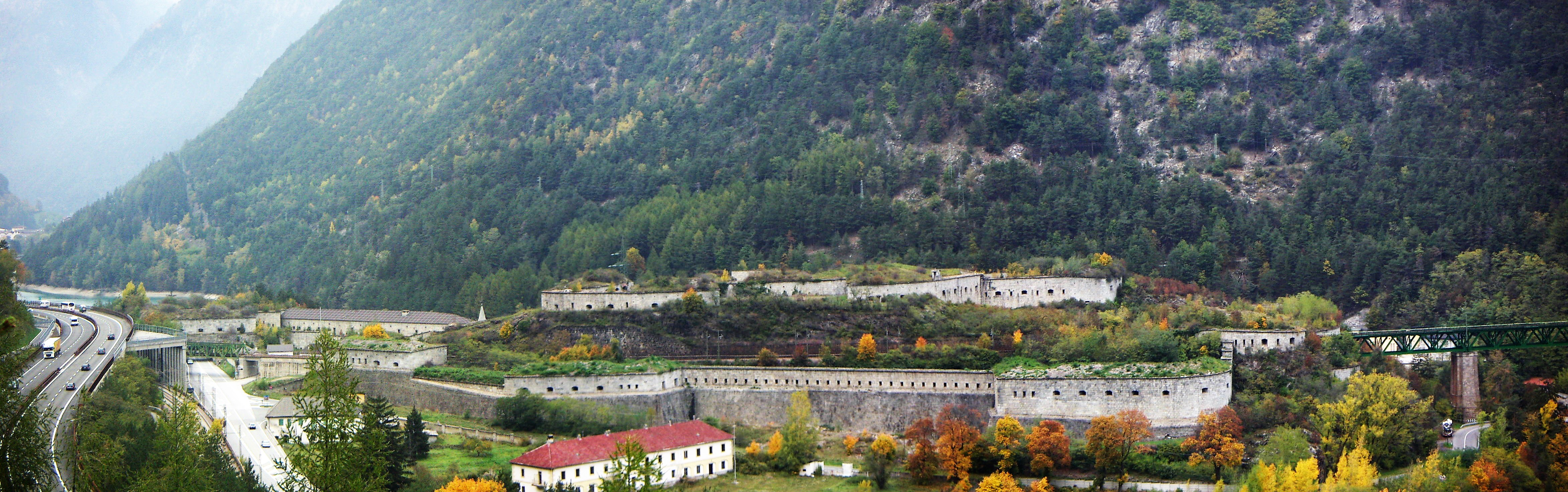
- Franzensfeste Fortress

Location
- Location within Italy
- Coordinates: 46.786°N 11.613°E

Franzensfeste Fortress (Italian: Forte di Fortezza; German: Festung Franzensfeste, literally "Franz's Fortress") is a fortress situated in the village of Franzensfeste, in South Tyrol, Italy.

Emperor Francis I began constructing the fortress in 1833. In 1838 the project was abandoned, because the area was not considered to be of sufficient importance for a fortress.

In the summer of 2008 the fortress was opened to the public for the first time as one of the locations of Manifesta 7, the European Biennial of Contemporary art.
