= Austrian Southern Railway Company =

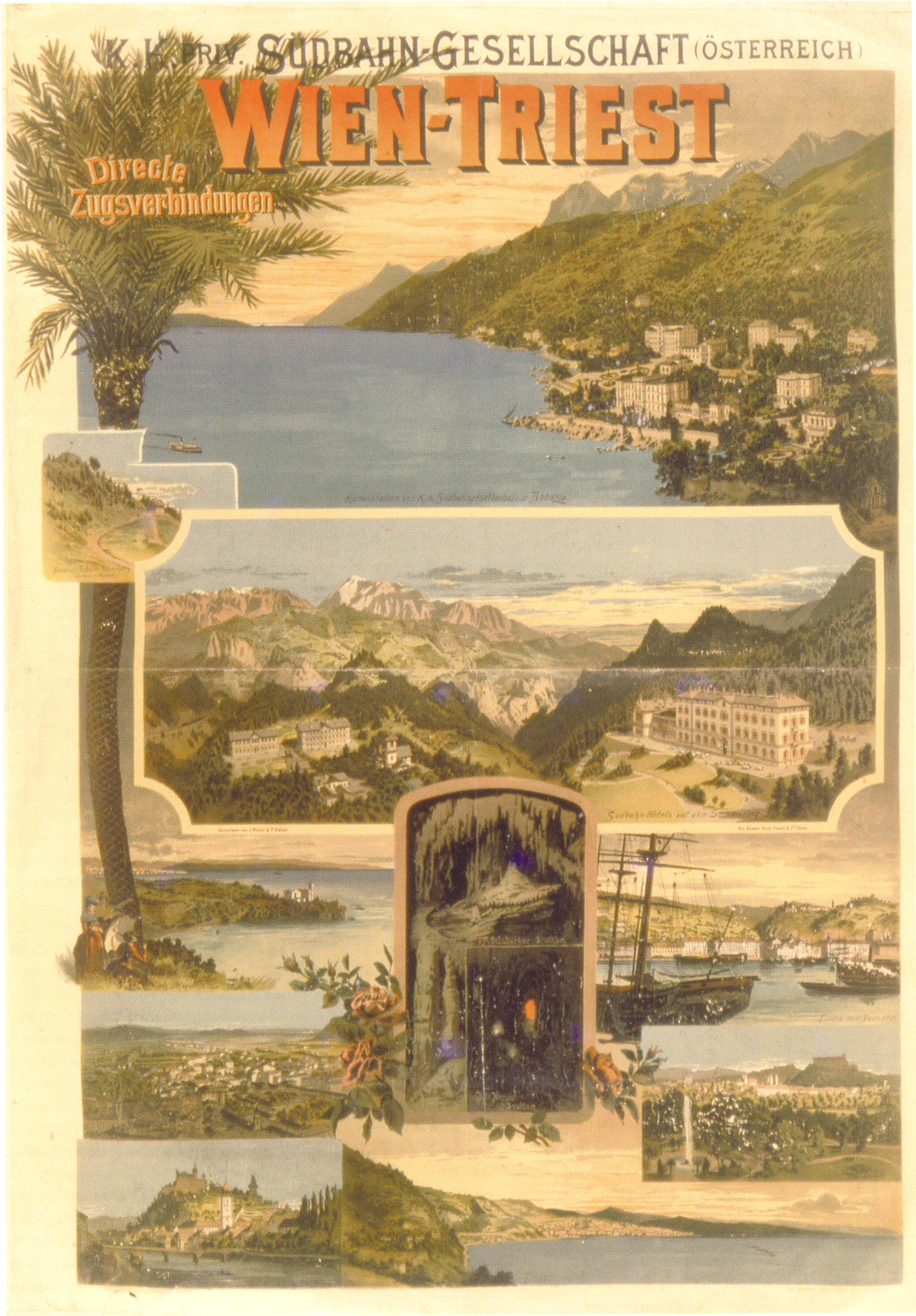
Advertising poster of the Südbahn-Gesellschaft, 1898

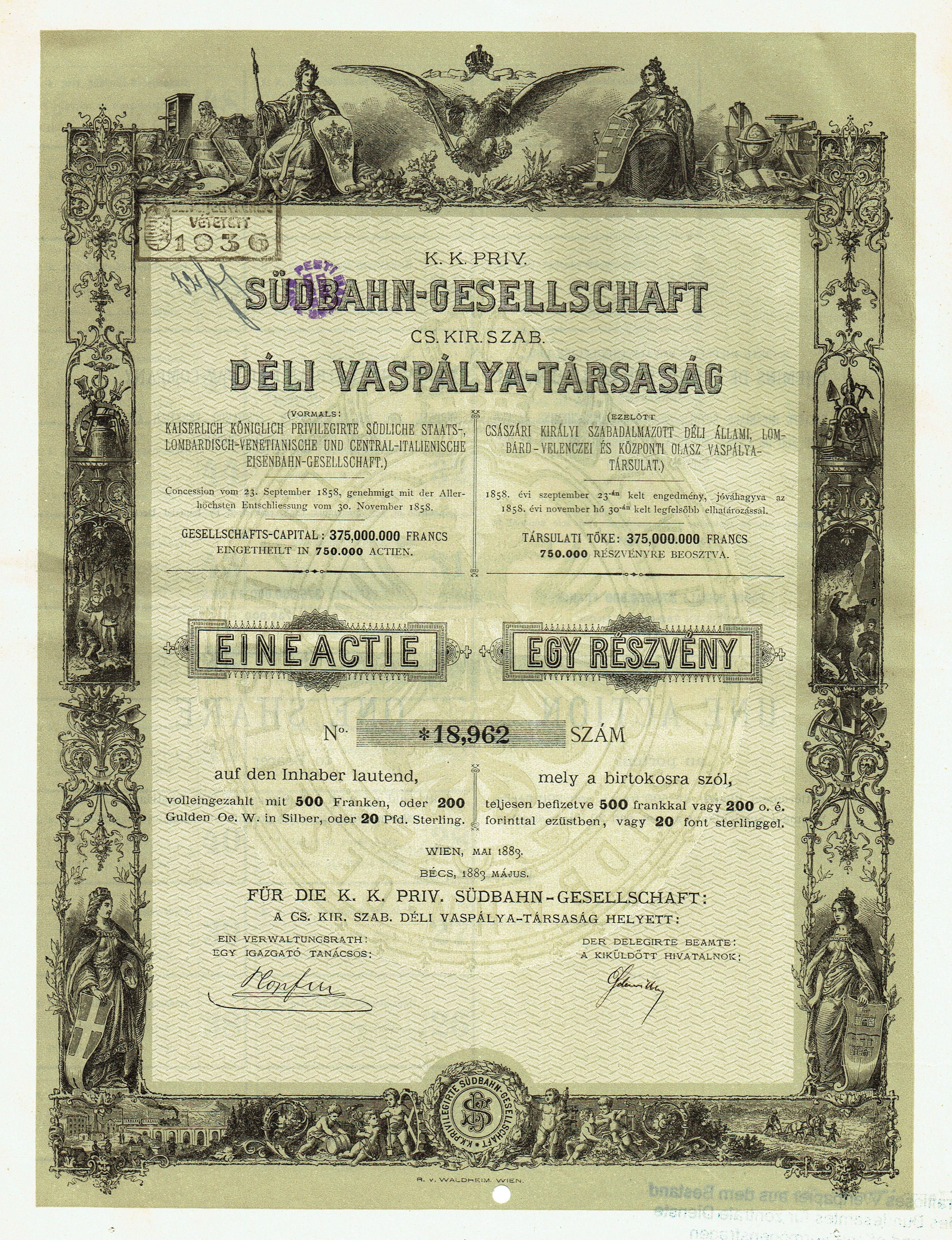
20 pound sterling share of the Südbahn-Gesellschaft, May 1883

The Südbahn-Gesellschaft (literally South Railway Company) was an Austrian corporation that built and operated numerous railway lines in the Austrian empire, Austria-Hungary (after 1867) and for some time in Austria, Hungary, and the Kingdom of Yugoslavia (after 1918).

The company was notable for two reasons: First, the split-up of its assets after the end of World War I took almost two decades. Second, the company existed even after ending all railway operations as an administration of assets, mainly for securing the pension claims of its former employees.

== History ==
The company was created in 1859, when the Austrian state was lacking sufficient funds for building new railways, as a joint-stock company in Vienna. The ownership was mainly in the hands of French investors.

As the successor of the Wien-Gloggnitzer Bahn and the k.k. Südliche Staatsbahn, the Südbahn-Gesellschaft operated the important Southern Railway line from Vienna to Triest, with its famous Semmering crossing. At the time of the company's creation, Venetia was part of Austria, and hence Venice was supposed to be the main Mediterranean harbour of the empire. After the loss of Venetia in 1867, Triest became the new main harbour.

The Südbahn-Gesellschaft also operated the line from Kufstein to Verona (later only to Ala), with its central piece, the Brenner railway, which had been completed in 1867.

The two north-south lines were connected by the east-west line from Marburg (an der Drau) via Klagenfurt to Franzensfeste. Moreover, multiple lines in current-day Italy, Hungary und Croatia were operated.

When Austria lost, in 1866, its rule over Upper Italy (Venetia and Lombardy), the new Strade Ferrate Alta Italia (SFAI) was split from the Südbahn-Gesellschaft, with the same main shareholders as the mother company.

During the following "golden time", the Südbahn-Gesellschaft was active in the propagation of various resorts, mainly on the Semmering and at the seaside resort Abbazia. At these places as well as at Toblach in the South Tyrol, the company operated its own railway hotels, which could conveniently be reached via its railway lines.

After the end of World War I, the company had to be split into various parts, as the new European nations wanted to get their share of its assets. This was especially complicated with locomotives and wagons, which were spread unevenly over the respective areas. It took the interstate commission handling these problems many years to arrive at a solution that was accepted by all nations.

In Austria, the Südbahn-Gesellschaft was refounded as the Donau-Save-Adria Eisenbahn-Gesellschaft (vormals Südbahn-Gesellschaft) (DOSAG) in 1923, the railway operations were handed over to the Austrian Federal Railways. The DOSAG would exist as a company until 1982. In Italy, it was still incorporated in 1990 as a pure asset management company. In Hungary, it existed as Duna-Száva-Adria-Vasúttársaság until 1932, after which it was merged into the Hungarian State Railways.
