= Franzensfeste =

- Comune
- Gemeinde Franzensfeste; Comune di Fortezza
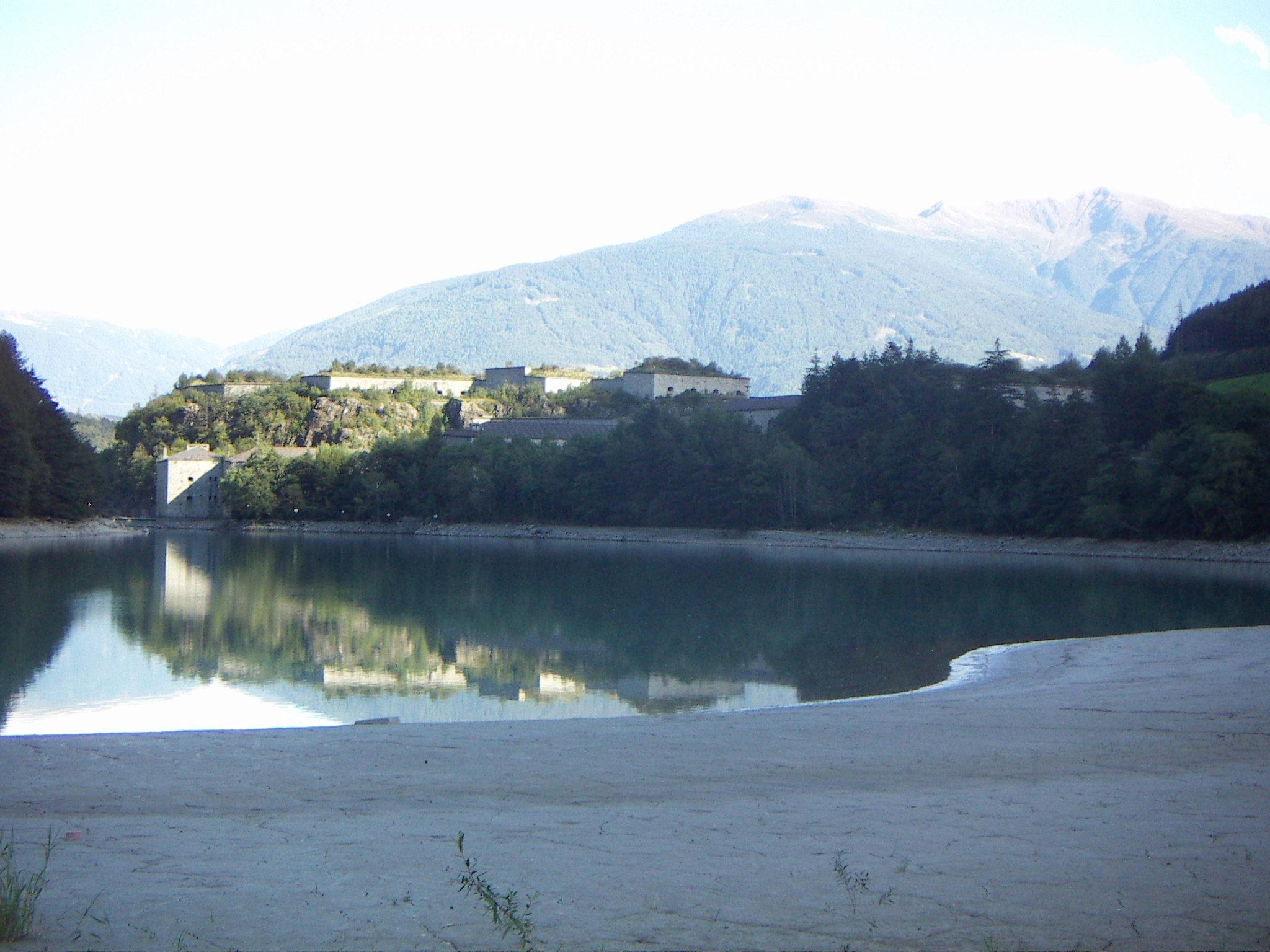
- Franzensfeste Fortress and Reservoir

- Coat of arms

- Location within Italy Location within Trentino-Alto Adige/Südtirol
- Coordinates: 46°47′N 11°37′E
- Country: Italy
- Region: Trentino-Alto Adige/Südtirol
- Province: South Tyrol
- Frazioni: Grassstein (Pradisopra), Mittewald (Mezzaselva)

Government
  - Mayor: Thomas Klapfer SVP

Area
  - Total: 61.74 km^{2} (23.84 sq mi)
- Elevation: 749 m (2,457 ft)

Population (31 December 2013)
  - Total: 972
  - Density: 15.7/km^{2} (40.8/sq mi)
- Demonym(s): German: Franzensfester, Festinga; Italian: Fortezzini
- Time zone: UTC+1 (CET)
  - Summer (DST): UTC+2 (CEST)
- Postal code: 39045
- Dialing code: 0472
- Website: Official website

Franzensfeste (German: [ˈfrantsn̩sˌfɛstə]; Italian: Fortezza [forˈtettsa]) is a comune and a village in South Tyrol in northern Italy. It is named after the large Franzensfeste Fortress erected from 1833 to 1838 and Franzensfeste station is also known as an important railway hub.

== Geography ==
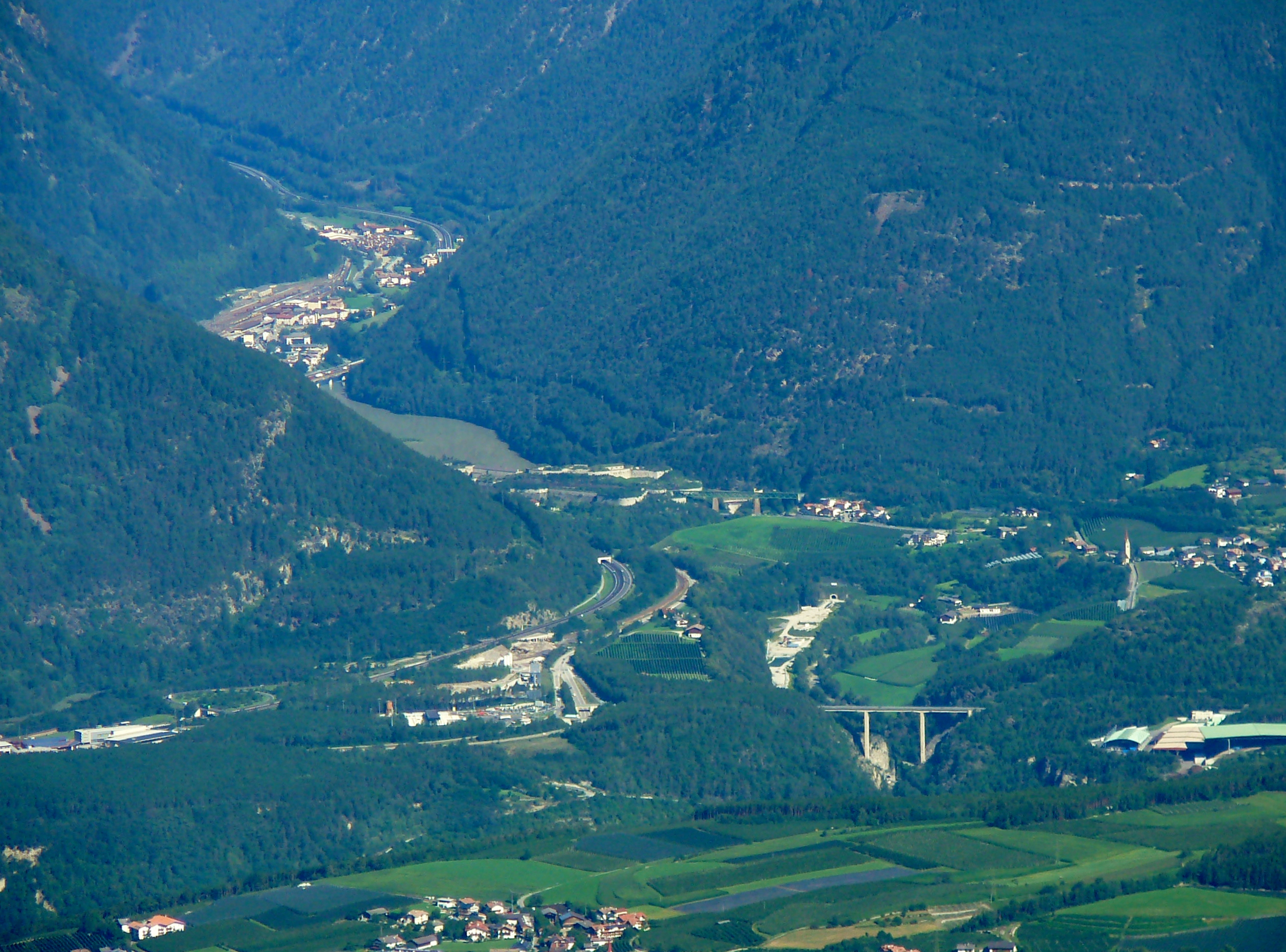
Wipptal at Franzensfeste

Franzensfeste is located in the southern Wipptal valley on the Eisack river, about 19 kilometres (12 mi) south of Sterzing and 11 kilometres (7 mi) north of Brixen. The settlement is situated on the western side of the valley, at the Sachsenklemme narrow where it is only a few hundred meters wide, along with the Brenner Railway line and the state road SS12 while the Autostrada A22 (Brenner Highway), running elevated on the same side, pass through the lake in its northern part entering a tunnel on the opposite side; the state road cross than the Eisack river nearby the railway station due north. The valley is confined by the Zillertal Alps in the northeast and the Sarntal Alps in the southwest, rising up to the Tagewaldhorn peak at 2,708 m (8,885 ft).

== History ==
=== Origin ===
Franzensfeste was founded recently. The village dates from the 19th century when the construction of the fortifications was begun, to which the site is also closely linked in name (into Italian language), and the railway. The parish was originally Mittewald, still the common land, with the two villages of Oberau and Unterau.

Archeological findings have shown the area to be settled by 2500 B.C. as indicated by the finding of home pottery. The Wipptal has always played an important role in the transit of goods on the north-south bound, first as the Amber Road between Greece, Sicily and Northern Europe later in the Roman period, between Aquileia and the regions beyond the Alps; also a 140-metre (460 ft) long stretch of the Roman Via Claudia Augusta has been unearthed.

In the 17th century, where the station is now placed, there were a few farms, one of which, was turned into an inn with the name "Post-Reifer". It is still in operation today.

=== Fortress ===
The military importance of the place became evident during the Tyrolean Rebellion in 1809 when General François Joseph Lefebvre, commander of 2500 Royal Saxon troopers, was defeated in an ambush by Andreas Hofer’s Tyrolean insurgents at the narrow which later was called Sachsenklemme ("Gorge of the Saxons”).

In the 1830s, Emperor Francis I of Austria wanted to build a defensive system on the strategically-important Brenner route since he feared an invasion from the south. The village was settled for strategic purposes, was well protected by the surrounding mountainous and could block the entrance to the Eisack Valley. Work began on June 17, 1833, and the Franzensfeste Fortress was inaugurated by Franz' successor Emperor Ferdinand I of Austria on August 18, 1838. The construction of the fortress and later of the Brenner railway, helped thousands of workers who found accommodation in Franzensfeste contributing to the development and growth of the village.

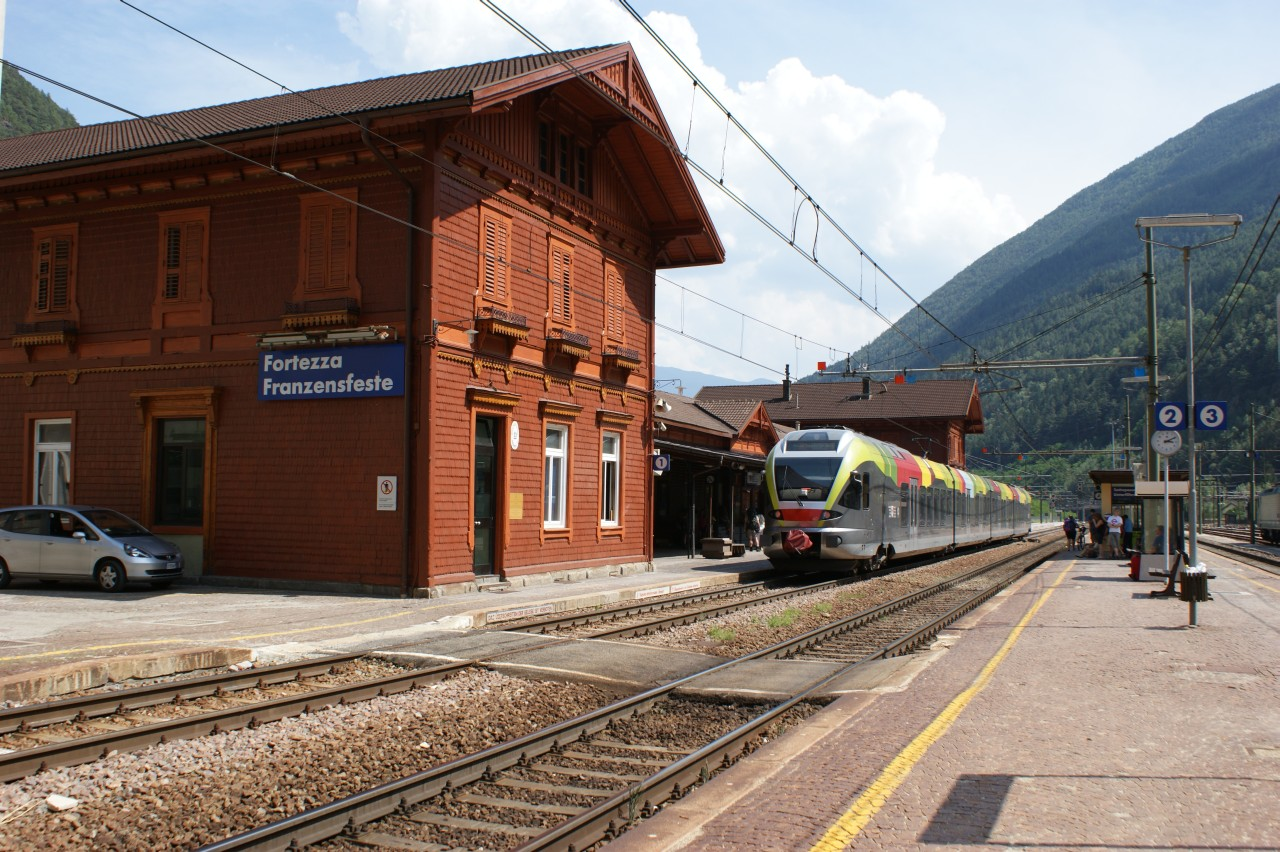
Franzensfeste station

In 1867 with the opening of a station on the Brenner Railway, Franzensfeste consolidated its role as a transport hub not only on the north-south direction, but also with the eastern branch-off into the Puster Valley (the Puster Valley Railway) to Carinthia and the Austrian Southern Railway line at Maribor in Styria, opened in 1871. The Franzensfeste Fortress, however, lost its strategic importance with the signing of the Triple Alliance military agreement by Germany, Austria-Hungary and the Kingdom of Italy in 1882. The fortifications were transformed into a military ammunition depot, which kept even when was transferred to Italy according to the 1919 Treaty of Saint-Germain.

In 1939 began the construction of the hydroelectric basin for the power plant in Brixen made necessary for the electrification of the railway; the work was completed the following year and the village of Unterau was flooded. Franzensfeste in 1940 was elevated to municipality, became an important railway junction and the infrastructure for the maintenance of the locomotives and housing the staff were built. Until the 1990s Franzensfeste was an important customs goods-station for cattle, but with the entry of Austria in the European Community has lost importance.

In the summer of 2008 the fortress of Franzensfeste was opened to the public for the first time as one of the locations of Manifesta 7, the European Biennial of Contemporary art. In 2009 the location hosted the so-called "Landesausstellung", an event remembering the Bicentenaire of the Tyrolean riots in 1809.

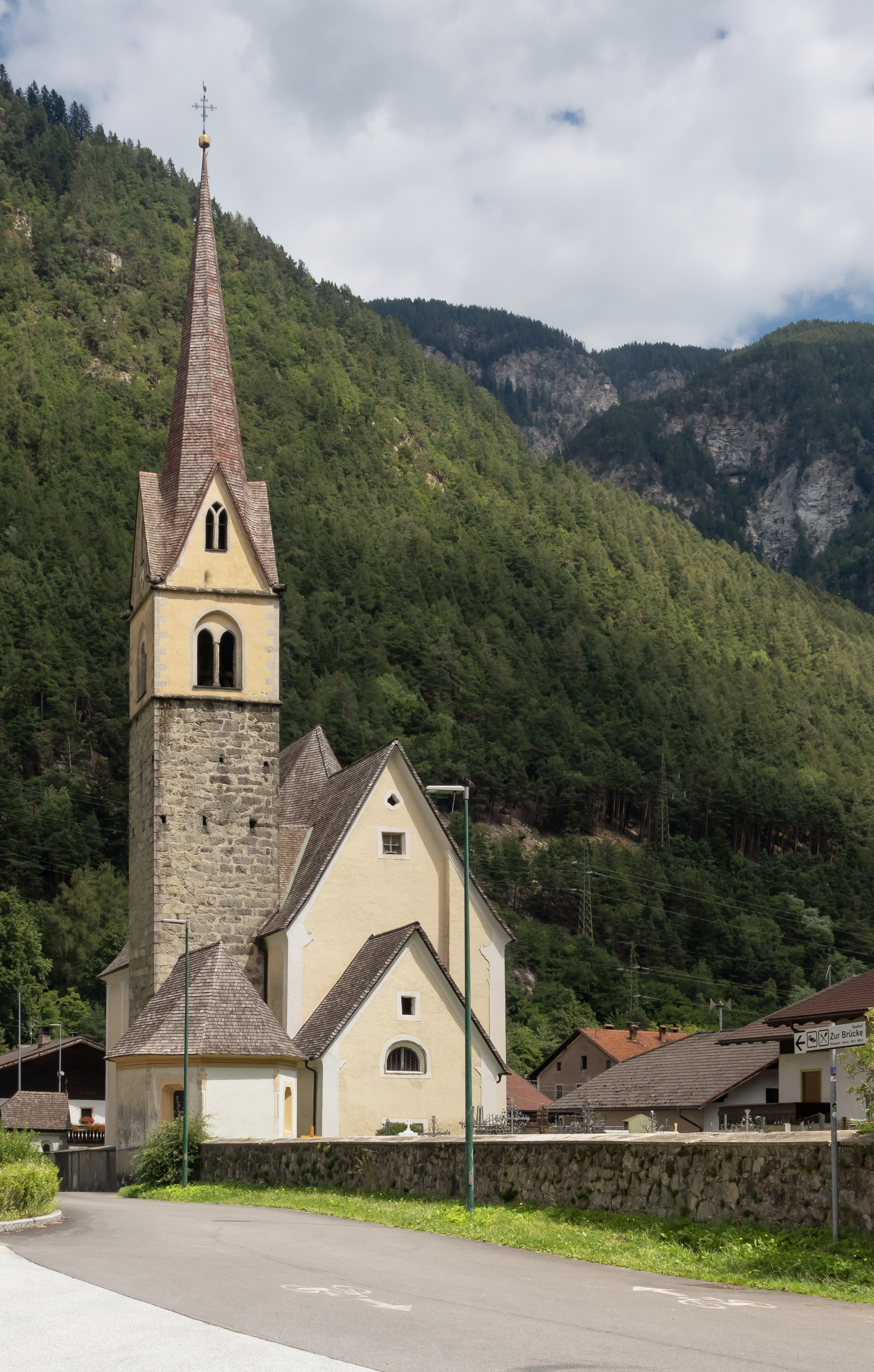
St. Martin in Mittewald

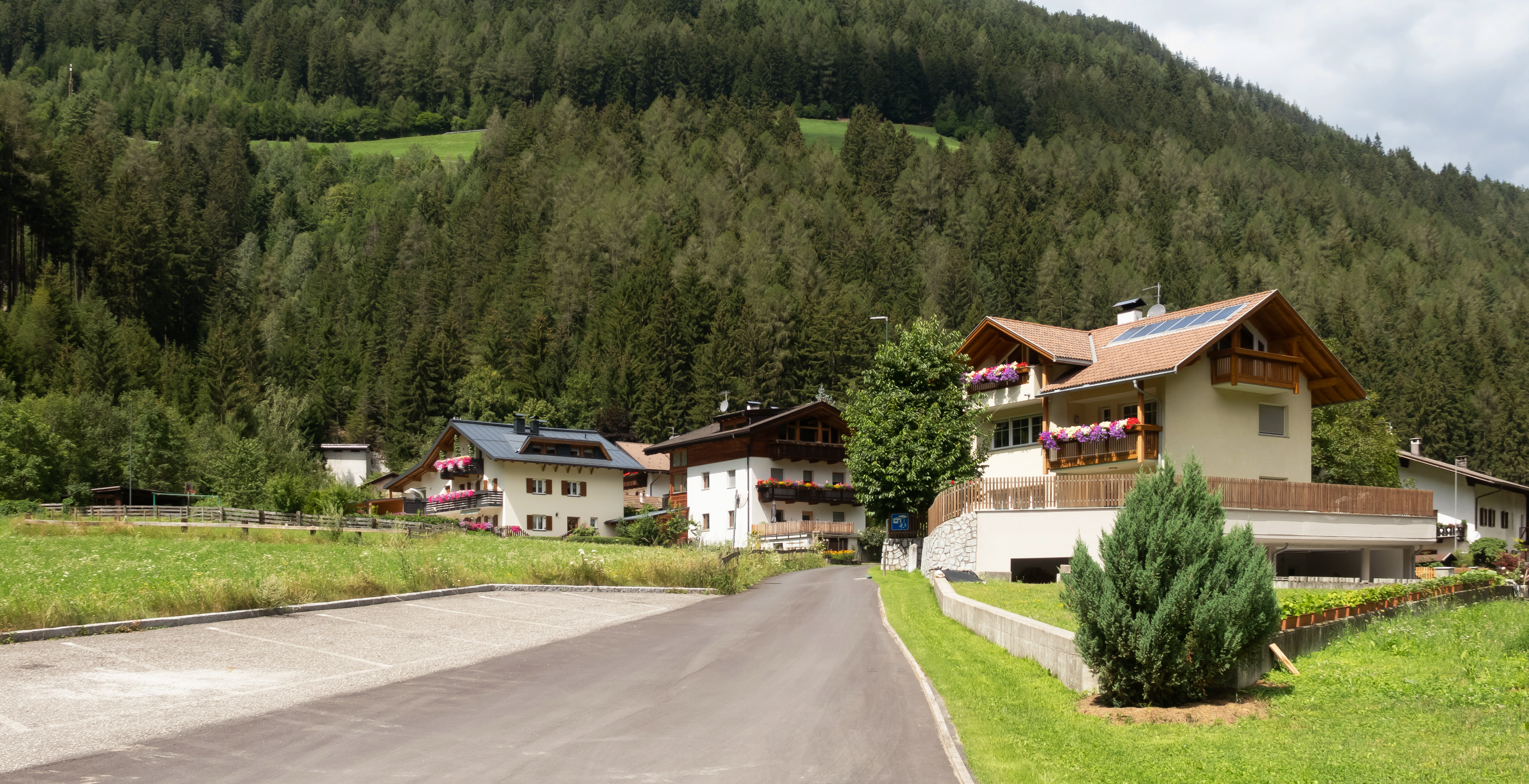
Grasstein

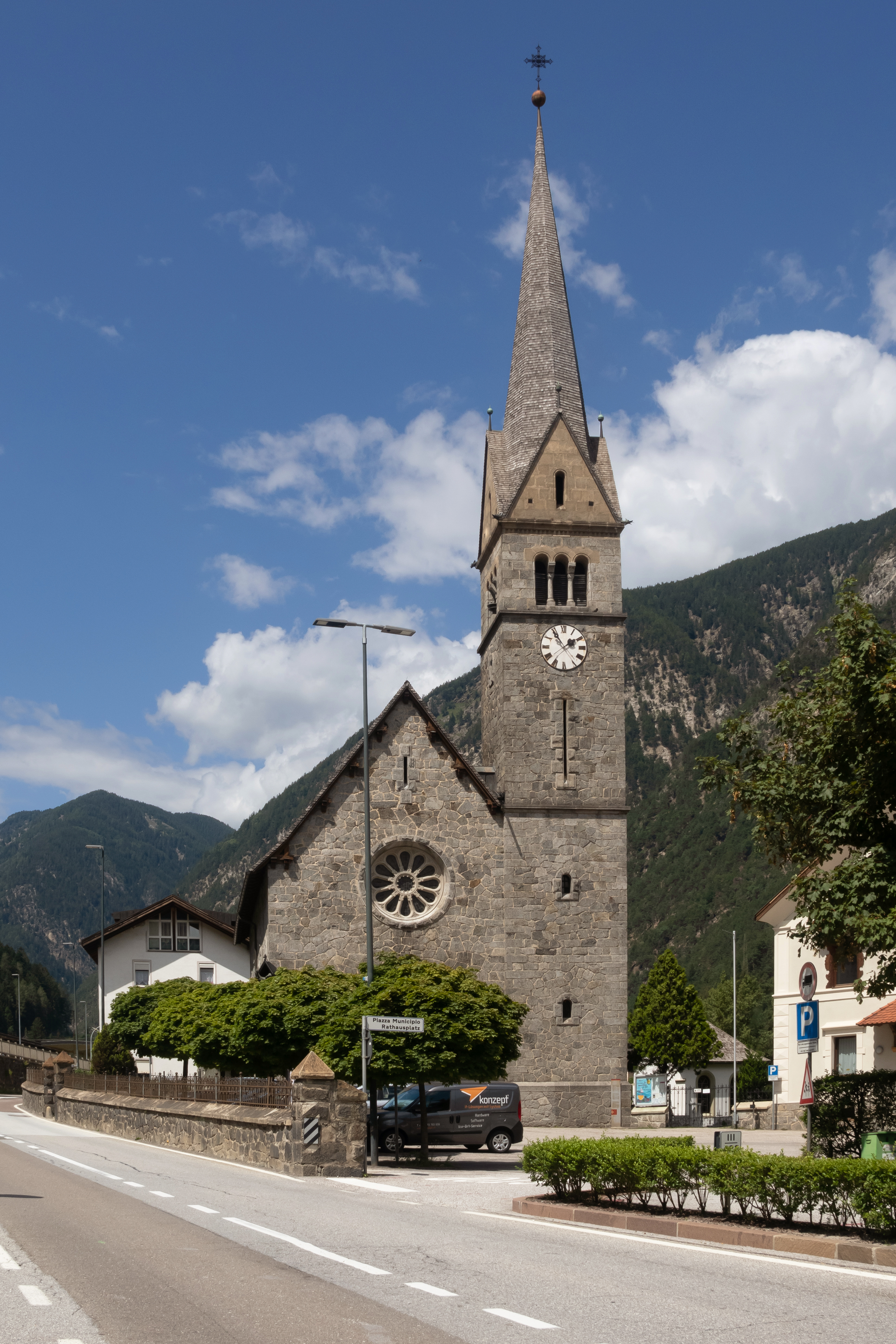
Sacred Heart Church in Franzensfeste

=== Coat-of-arms ===
The emblem of Franzensfeste consists of an argent inverted upsilon symbolizing the roads to the village. The gules area, on top left, symbolizes the rock; the azure, top right, the lake and the vert the meadows. The emblem was adopted in 1968.

== Society ==
=== Linguistic distribution ===
According to the 2024 census, 57.34% of the population speak German, 41.09% Italian and 1.56% Ladin as first language.

== Bibliography ==
- Christoph Hackelsberger (1986). Die k.k. Franzensfeste: ein Monumentalwerk der Befestigungskunst des 19. Jahrhunderts. Munich: Deutscher Kunstverlag. ISBN 978-3-422-00795-6
