= Brenner Railway =

Major Austro-Italian transport link

Coordinates: 46°18′26″N 11°14′51″E

Innsbruck–Bozen–Verona railway
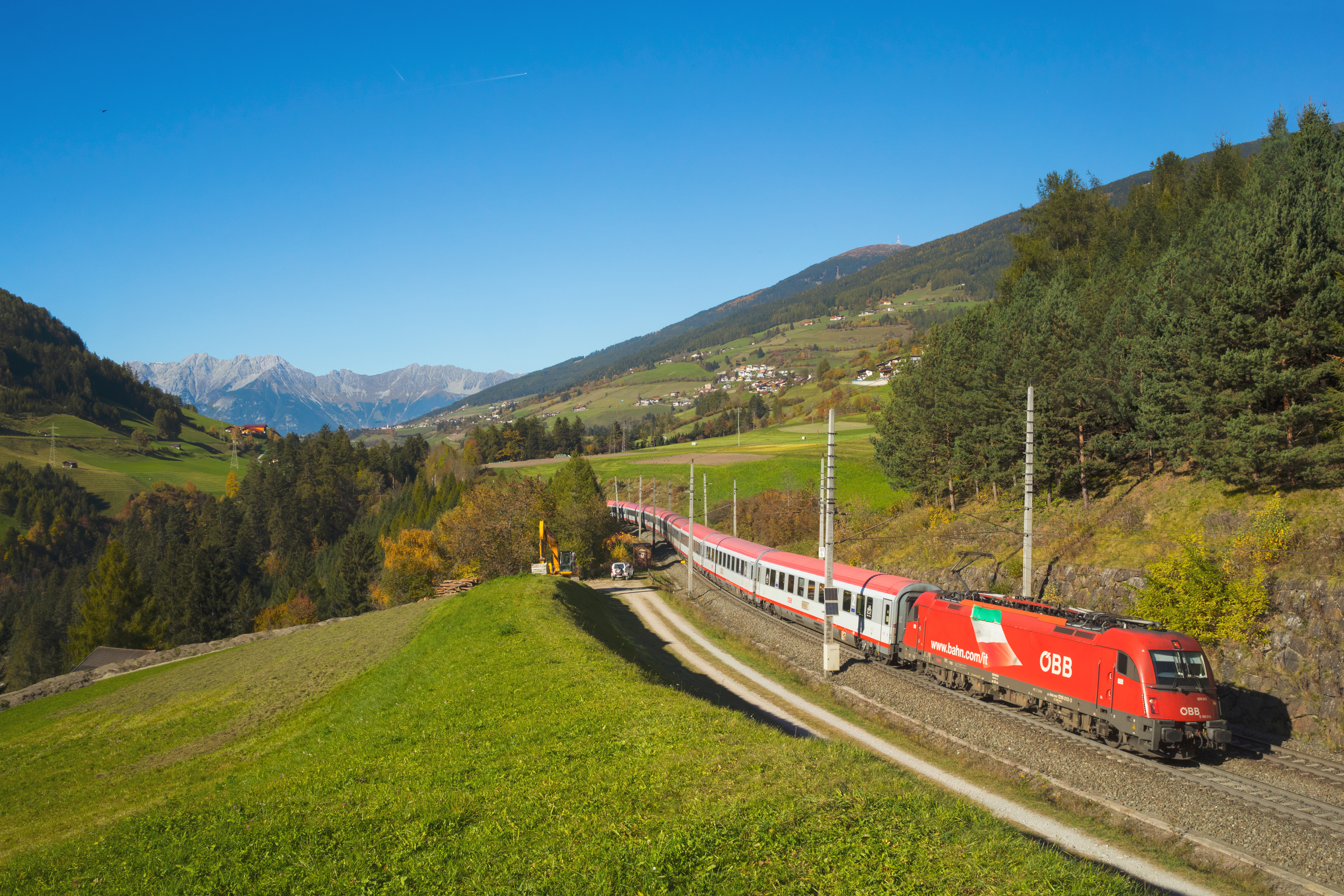
- An ÖBB EuroSprinter with a Eurocity train passes KM 91,5 towards Matrei station.

Overview
- Line number: 302 02 Austria; 42 (Brenner–Bozen); 43 (Bozen–Verona)
- Locale: Austria and Italy

Service
- Route number: 300 (Salzburg Hbf - Brennero/Brenner); 301 (Jenbach - Telfs-Pfaffenhofen / Steinach in Tirol); 50 (Italy)

Technical
- Line length: 275.4 km (171.1 mi)
- Track gauge: 1,435 mm (4 ft 8 1/2 in) standard gauge
- Minimum radius: 264 m (866 ft)
- Electrification: 15 kV 16.7 Hz Austria; 3 kV Italy
- Operating speed: 180 km/h (112 mph)
- Maximum incline: north ramp: 2.5%; south ramp: 2.25%
Route map
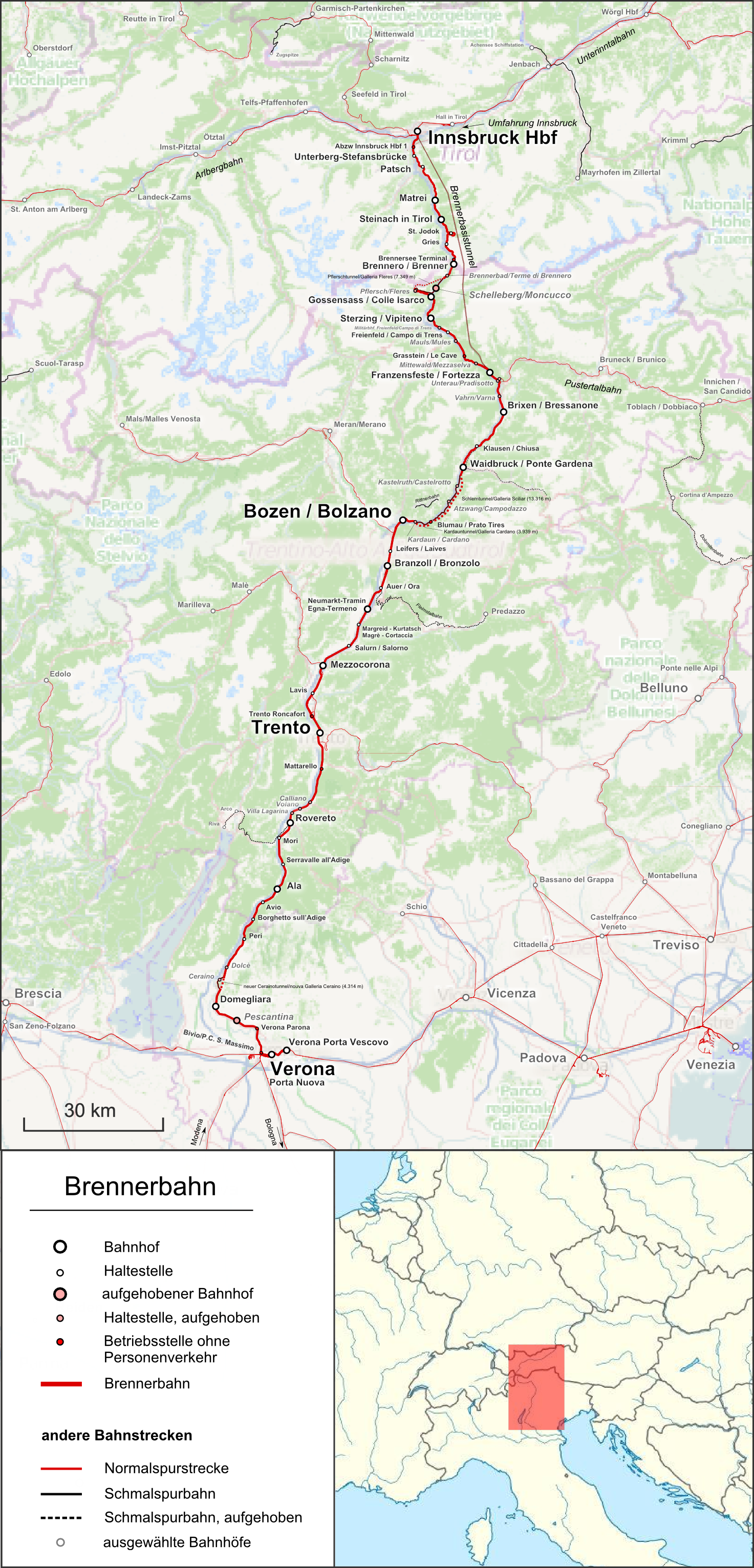
- Source: Italian railway atlas

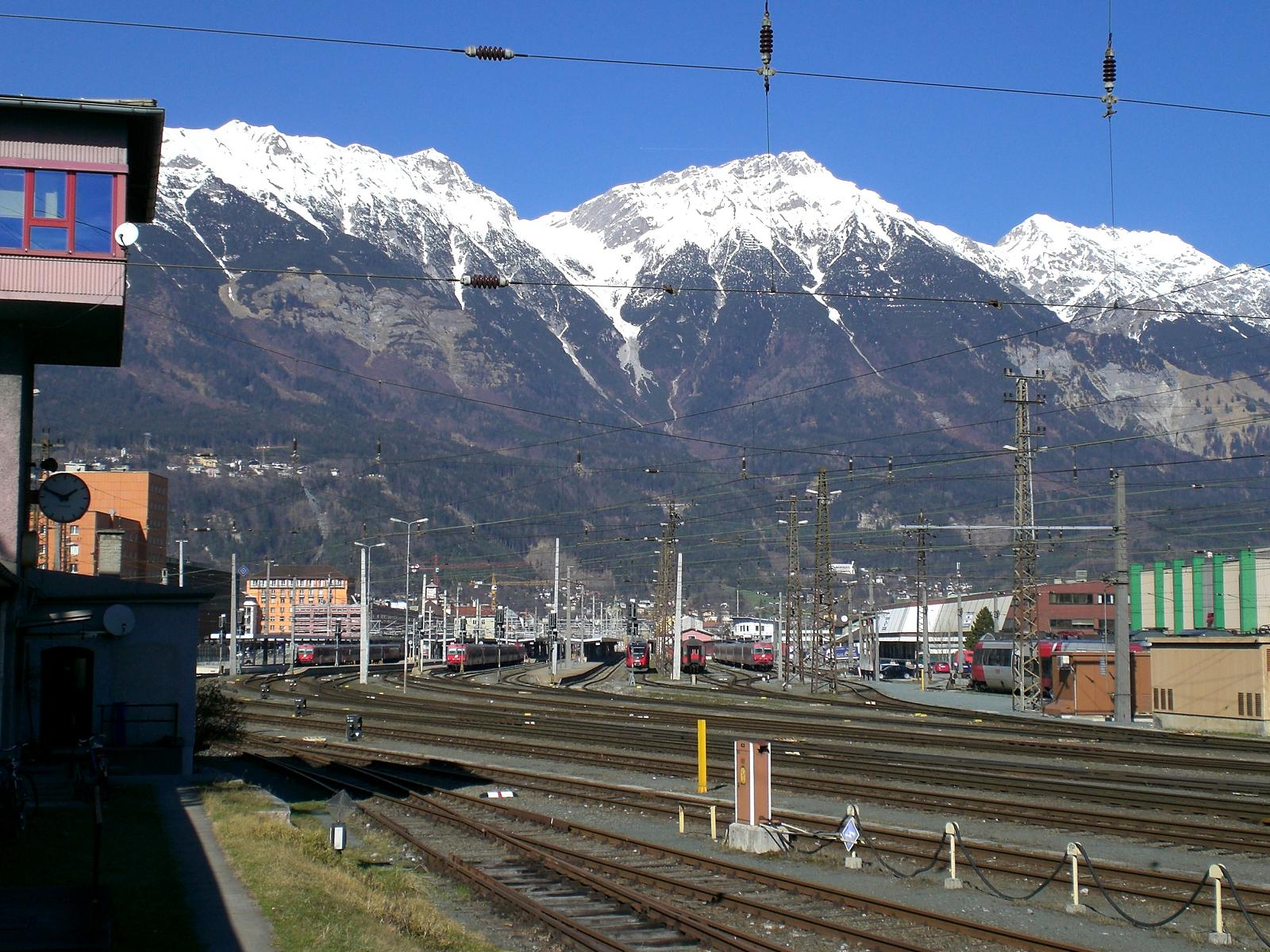
Innsbruck station at the north end of the Brenner railway

The Brenner Railway (German: Brennerbahn; Italian: Ferrovia del Brennero) is a major line connecting the Austrian and Italian railways from Innsbruck to Verona, climbing up the Wipptal (German for "Wipp Valley"), passing over the Brenner Pass, descending down the Eisacktal (German for "Eisack Valley") to Bolzano, then further down the Adige Valley to Trento and Rovereto, and along the section of the Adige Valley, called in Italian the "Vallagarina", to Verona. This railway line is part of the Line 1 of Trans-European Transport Networks (TEN-T). It is considered a "fundamental" line by the state railways Ferrovie dello Stato (FS).

== History ==
The railway line was designed under the Austrian Empire in the mid-19th century to ensure rapid and safe transport between Tyrol and northern Italy, especially Lombardy–Venetia. It was thus strategically important not only for economic but also for military reasons, as Austria was strongly committed to maintaining its borders south of the Alps.

The first section to be built was the lower section between Verona and Bolzano/Bozen. The design of this section was approved on 10 July 1853 by the engineer Alois Negrelli, an employee of the Südbahn, known for having built other Alpine railway lines and for developing a project of the Suez Canal. The section was opened in two different parts: on 23 March 1859 between Verona to Trento and 16 May 1859 from Trento to Bolzano. This construction was handled by the k.k. Nord-und-Süd-Tiroler Staatsbahn (German: "North and South Tyrol State Railways"), but the company was taken over by the new Austrian Southern Railway (German: Südbahn) at the beginning of 1859.

Despite the loss of Veneto in the Third Italian War of Independence and its consequent shift of the border between Italy and Austria to Borghetto on the current boundary of Trentino and Verona in October 1866, the upper section from Bolzano/Bozen to Innsbruck was incomplete. The 127-kilometre (79 mi) route from Innsbruck to Bolzano/Bozen took only three years to build. This section had been under construction and was finally opened on 24 August 1867. The main designer and engineer, Karl von Etzel, died in 1865; he was not able to witness the completion of his work. After the Semmering Railway, this Brenner Line was the second mountain railway built within the Austro-Hungarian Empire. It was also the first through line to cross over the Alps.

The section south of Borghetto became part of the Società per le strade ferrate dell'Alta Italia (Italian for Upper (Northern) Italian Railways, SFAI) in 1866. In the 1885 reorganisation it was absorbed by the Società per le Strade Ferrate Meridionali (Adriatic Network). The line came under the control of Ferrovie dello Stato upon its establishment in 1905.

In 1919, Italy acquired Trentino-South Tyrol under the Treaty of Saint-Germain-en-Laye and the Austro-Italian border moved to Brenner. The section from Trento/Trent to Brenner was subsequently electrified at 3,700 V at three-phase 16.7 Hz between 1929 and 1934. Electrification was converted to 3,000 V DC on 30 May 1965.

In preparation for the proposed Brenner Base Tunnel, the Innsbruck bypass was completed in 1994 to improve access to the Lower Inn Valley Railway. The bypass consists of a 12.75-kilometre (7.92 mi) tunnel (Austria's longest) and aims to remove the bulk of the freight train traffic from Innsbruck. In Italy, several new sections have been built, removing sections of line with several short tunnels with small cross sections. These include the 13,159-metre-long (43,173 ft) Sciliar Tunnel opened in 1994, the 7,267-metre-long (23,842 ft) Pflersch Tunnel opened in 1999 and the 3,939-metre-long (12,923 ft) Cardano Tunnel opened in 1998.

== Future ==
Following a sharp increase in freight traffic through the Brenner Pass (largely on road), the railway is currently considered to have insufficient capacity. Moreover, its steep grades, tight radius bends and the need to change locomotive engines at Brenner due to two different electrical systems as used in Austria and Italy mean that the average travel speed is low. For these reasons, the creation of a new line is planned from Verona to Munich via Innsbruck. At the heart of this project lies a 55-kilometre-long (34 mi) tunnel between Franzensfeste and Innsbruck, known as the Brenner Base Tunnel.

== Route ==
The maximum grade on the track is 31 per thousand (3.1%). The minimum curve radius is 264 metres (866 ft). The highest point of the track is Brenner station at 1,371 metres (4,498 ft), which is also the highest point reached on the standard gauge networks of the Austrian Federal Railways (ÖBB) and the Italian Ferrovie dello Stato (FS) networks.

To overcome the steep climb (796 metres (2,612 ft) between Innsbruck and Brenner) two spiral tunnels were built, using the sides of a valley at St. Jodok on the Austrian side and the sides of the Pflerschtal (German for "Pflersch Valley") on the Italian side.

At Brenner station, located on the Brenner Pass (1,371 metres; 4,498 ft), there is a monument to the designer, Karl von Etzel. This station is situated at the border between Italy and Austria and also the operational border between the ÖBB and FS networks. The two companies operate different electrical systems, (15,000 V AC at 16.7 Hz in Austria, and 3,000 V DC in Italy), which requires a stop to change electric locomotives. For this reason, for a long time the operation of express trains from Munich to Verona and Milan was carried out with diesel railcars. Until 30 May 1965 was also needed a second engine change in Bolzano station, as the Bolzano–Brenner section still operated under three-phase AC electrification.

In recent years the introduction of multicurrent rolling stock, which can be run on both the Austrian and Italian networks, has made it possible, at least in principle, to avoid locomotive changes. However, the need for locomotives to carry equipment for different signalling systems and to have safety approvals for different networks and lines, and the need for staff to know operating rules and routes has limited multicurrent operations in practice.

Trains on the Brenner Railway

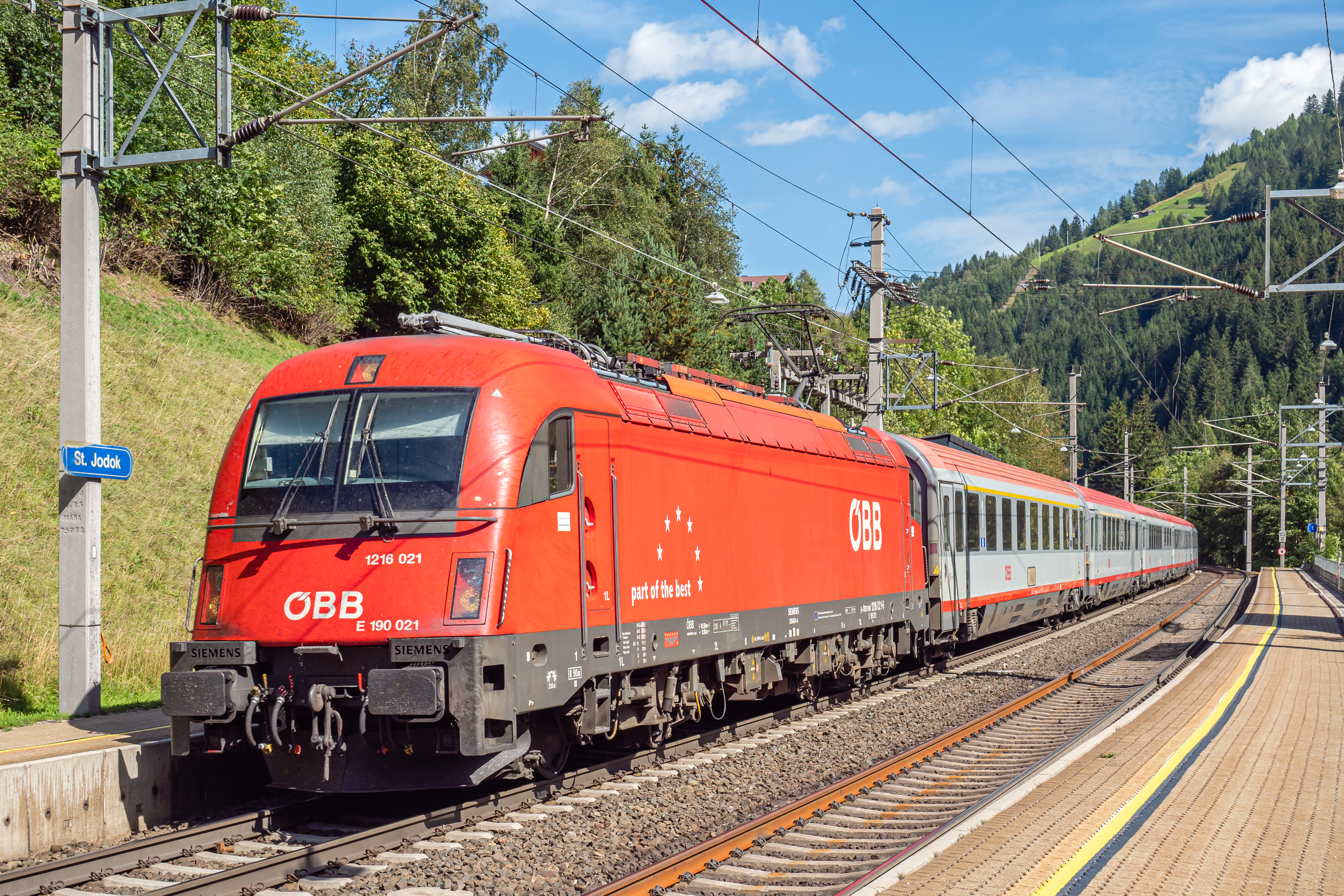
An ÖBB EuroSprinter on the Brenner railway.

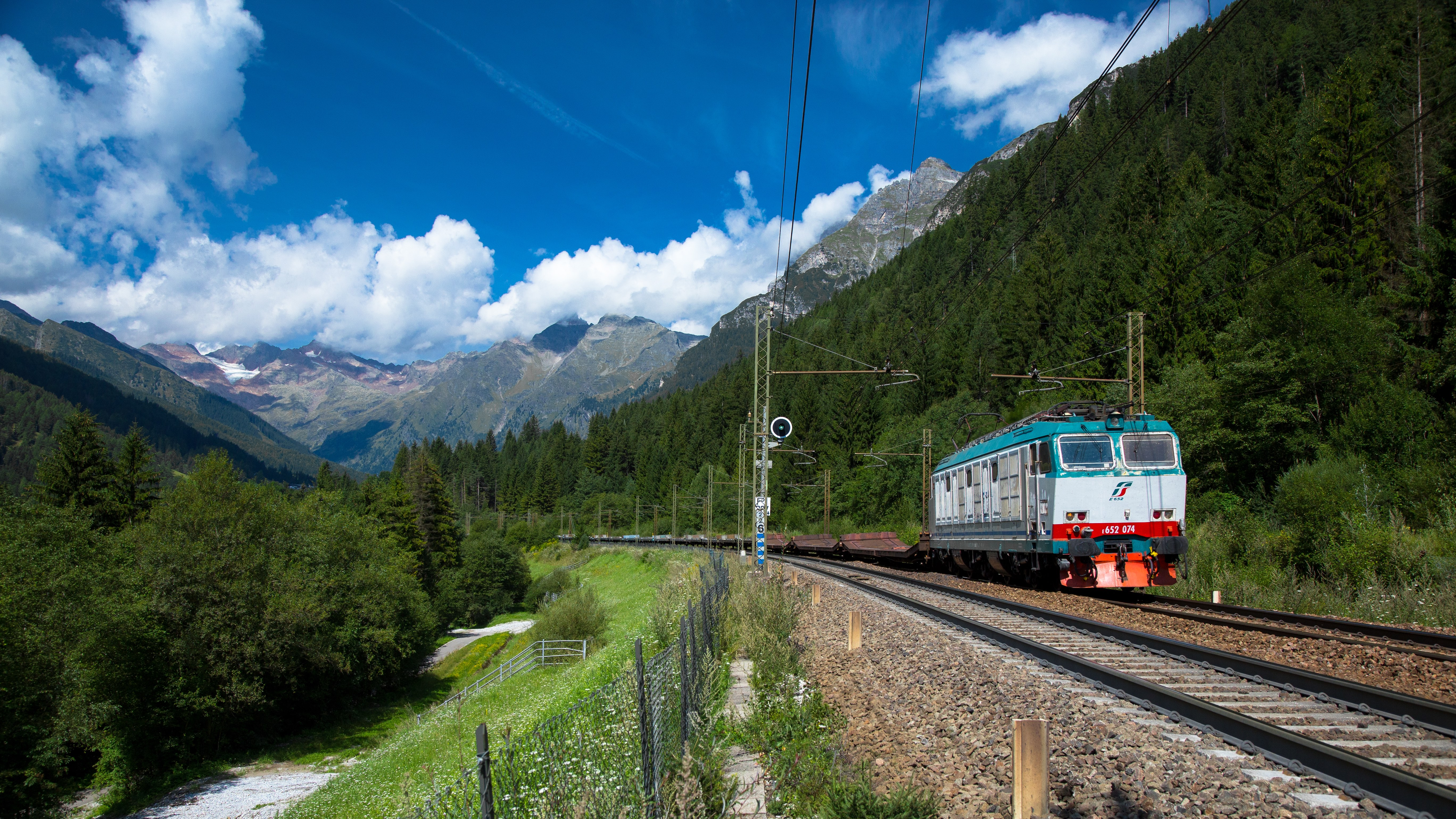
An FS Class E.632 with a train on the Brenner railway.

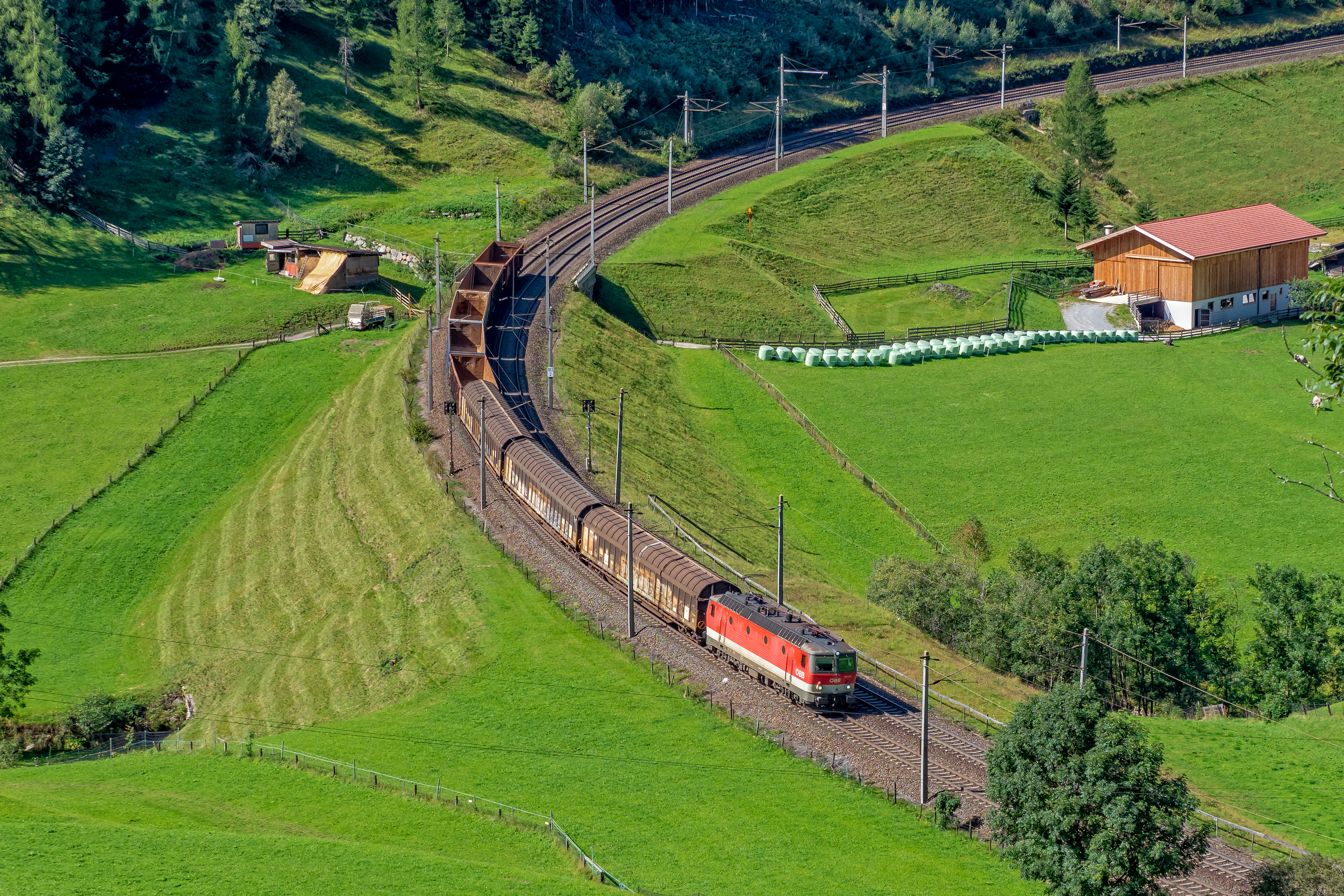
An ÖBB Class 1044 with a train on the Brenner railway.

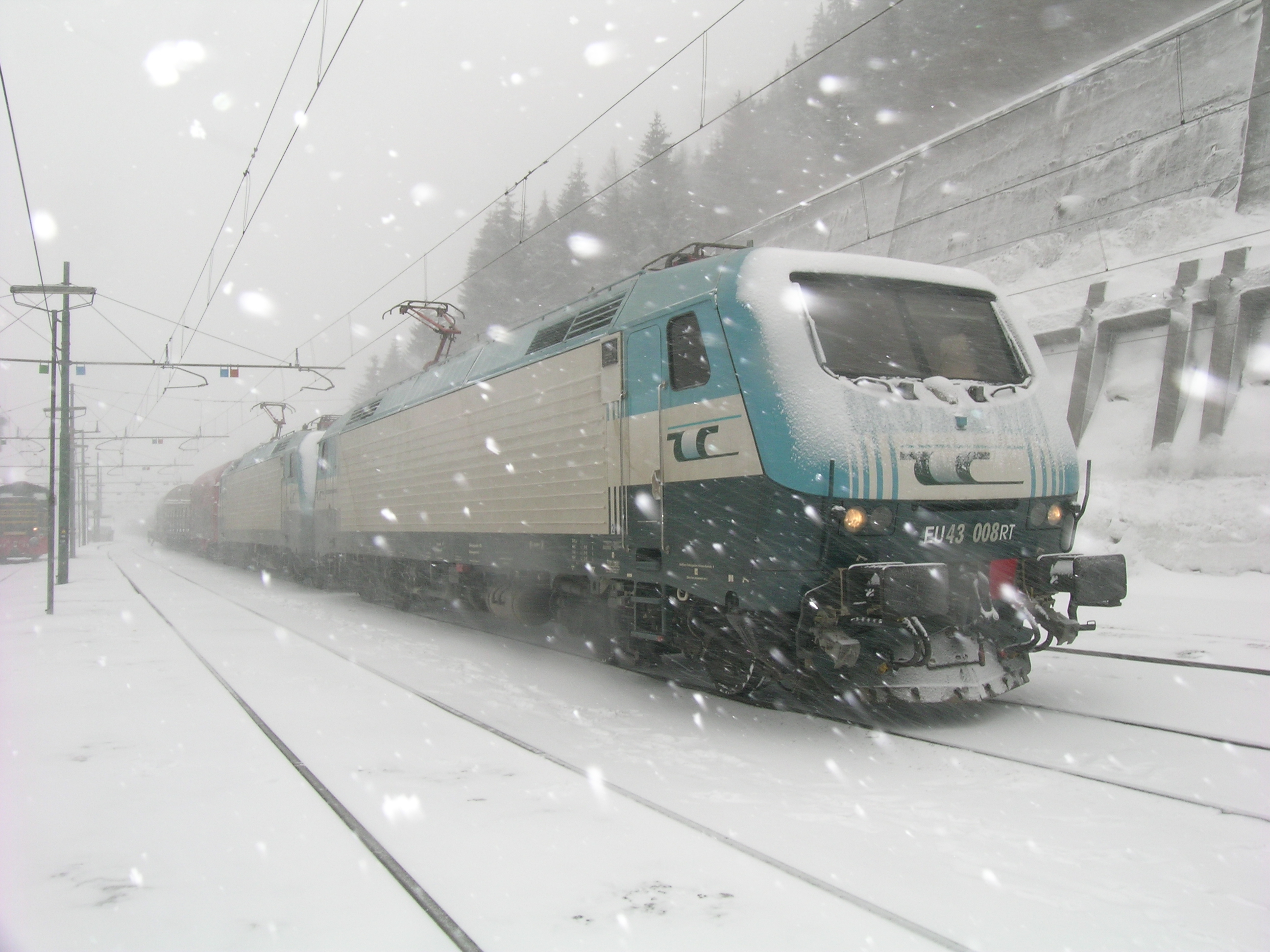
FS Class E.412 on the Brenner railway.
