= Innsbruck bypass =

Key rail transport link in western Austria

Coordinates: 47°16′55″N 11°32′29″E

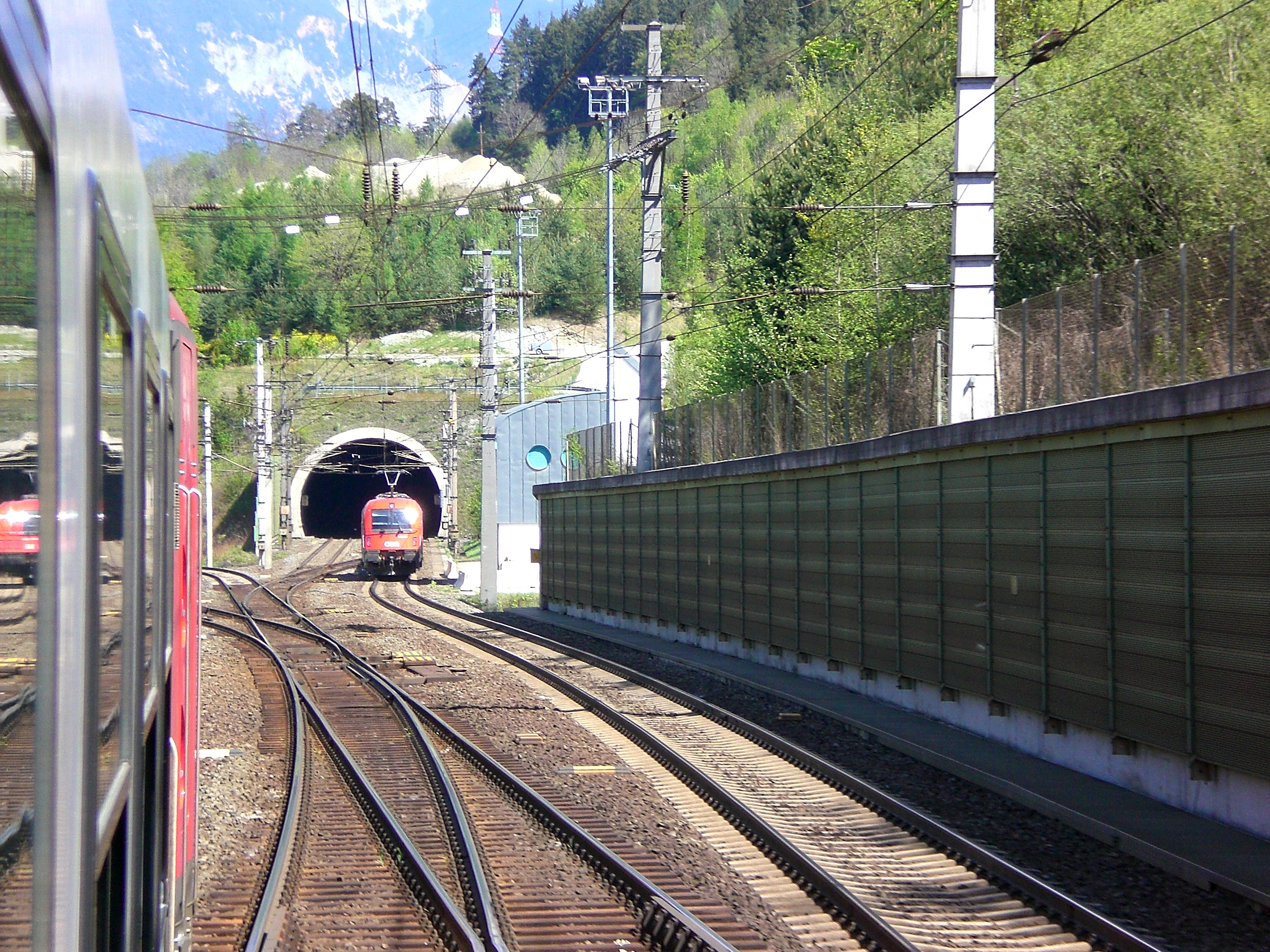
- South portal of the Inntal Tunnel

Overview
- Line number: 305 01

Technical
- Line length: 14,853
- Track gauge: 1435
- Electrification: 15 kV 16,7 Hz AC
- Operating speed: 160 max.
- Maximum incline: 0,9 %

The Innsbruck bypass (German: Umfahrung Innsbruck or sometimes Güterzugumfahrung Innsbruck, that is the Innsbruck freight railway bypass) is a 14.853-kilometre (9.229 mi)-long double-track electrified main line of the Austrian railways. It connects the Lower Inn Valley railway with the Brenner railway, bypassing Innsbruck. It was opened on 29 May 1994. The line is at a major part of the rail freight network of Austrian Federal Railways (ÖBB).

The bypass is part of the Line 1 of Trans-European Transport Networks (TEN-T). It was intended to increase the capacity of the line and to reduce the noise created by freight trains on the city of Innsbruck. It cost an estimated €211 million to build.

The Deutsche Reichsbahn (German Imperial Railways) built a local bypass of Innsbruck station during World War II in 1944, which was demolished in 1945.

Major components of the Bypass Innsbruck are:

- the grade-separated Fritzens-Wattens 2 junction,
- the 488 metre-long bridge over the Inn,
- the 12,696 metre-long Inntal (Inn valley) tunnel
- the Innsbruck 1 junction

== Junction structure at Fritzens-Wattens 2 ==
The Fritzens-Wattens 2 junction is located at the 60.980 km (37.891 mi) mark on the Kufstein–Innsbruck line (Lower Inn Valley line) near Volders-Baumkirchen station. The junction is a grade-separated structure that allows trains to run on and off without crossing on-coming trains on the level. The two bypass tracks run between the tracks to and from Innsbruck where they separate. The turnouts have radii of 1,200 m (3,900 ft), allowing trains to operate at full speed. When the New Lower Inn Valley line is opened it will connect to the inner pair of tracks, allowing trains to run between the new line and bypass without any change. The bypass will in effect become part of the new line.

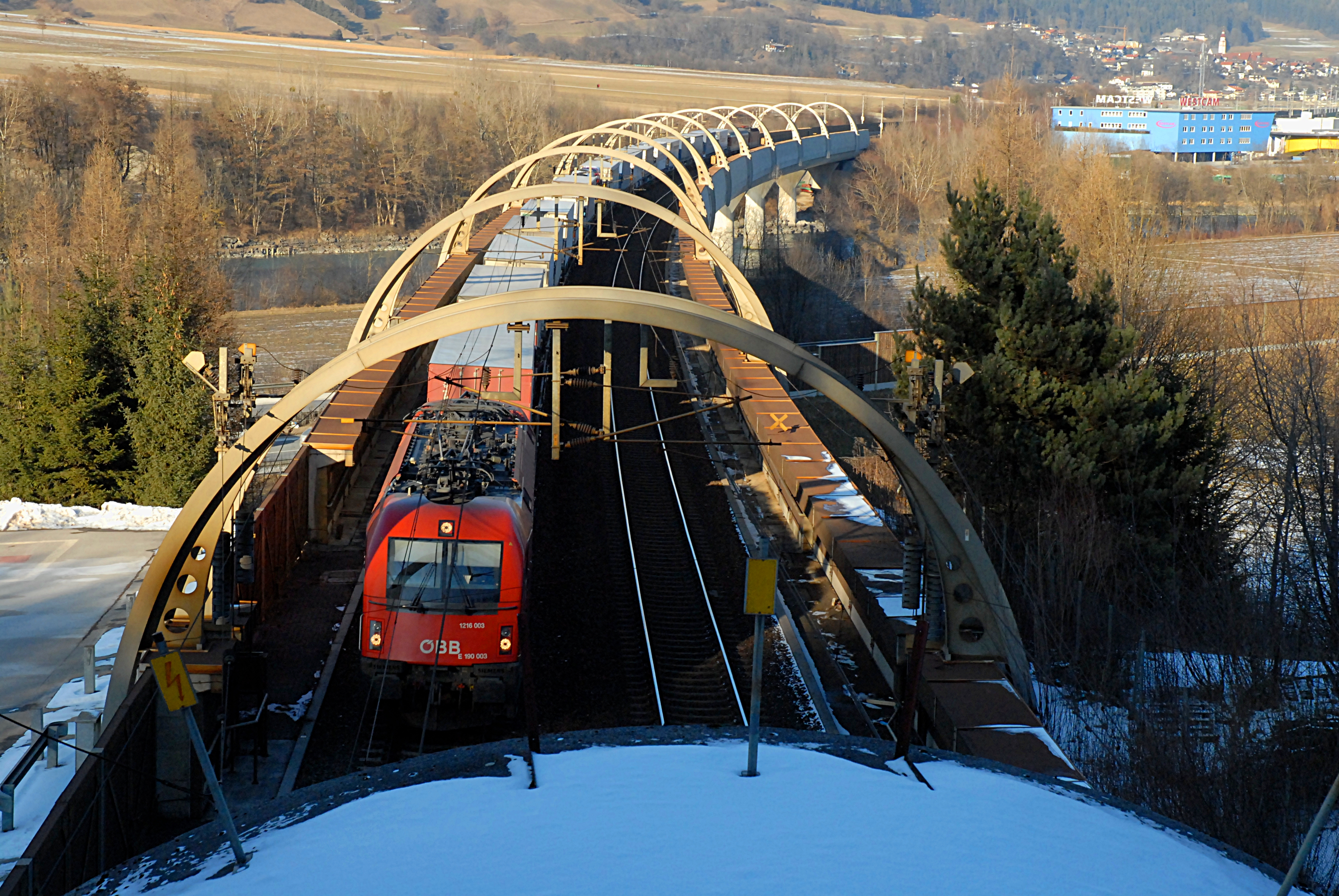
Inn bridge from the north portal of the Inntal tunnel

=== Inn bridge ===
The Inn bridge is a 488 m (1,601 ft) long prestressed concrete structure. It crosses the Inn and the Inntal Autobahn A12 and leads directly to the north portal of the Inntal tunnel. In order to strengthen the structure, the side walls rise to 2.2 metres (7 ft 3 in) above the level of the track. The interior of the walls are equipped with material that absorbs traffic noise. The construction of the bridge was time-consuming in order to maintain the minimum clearance of 4.20 m (13 ft 9 in) above the Inntal Autobahn, requiring a 52 m (171 ft)-long 2,800 ton concrete box bridge.

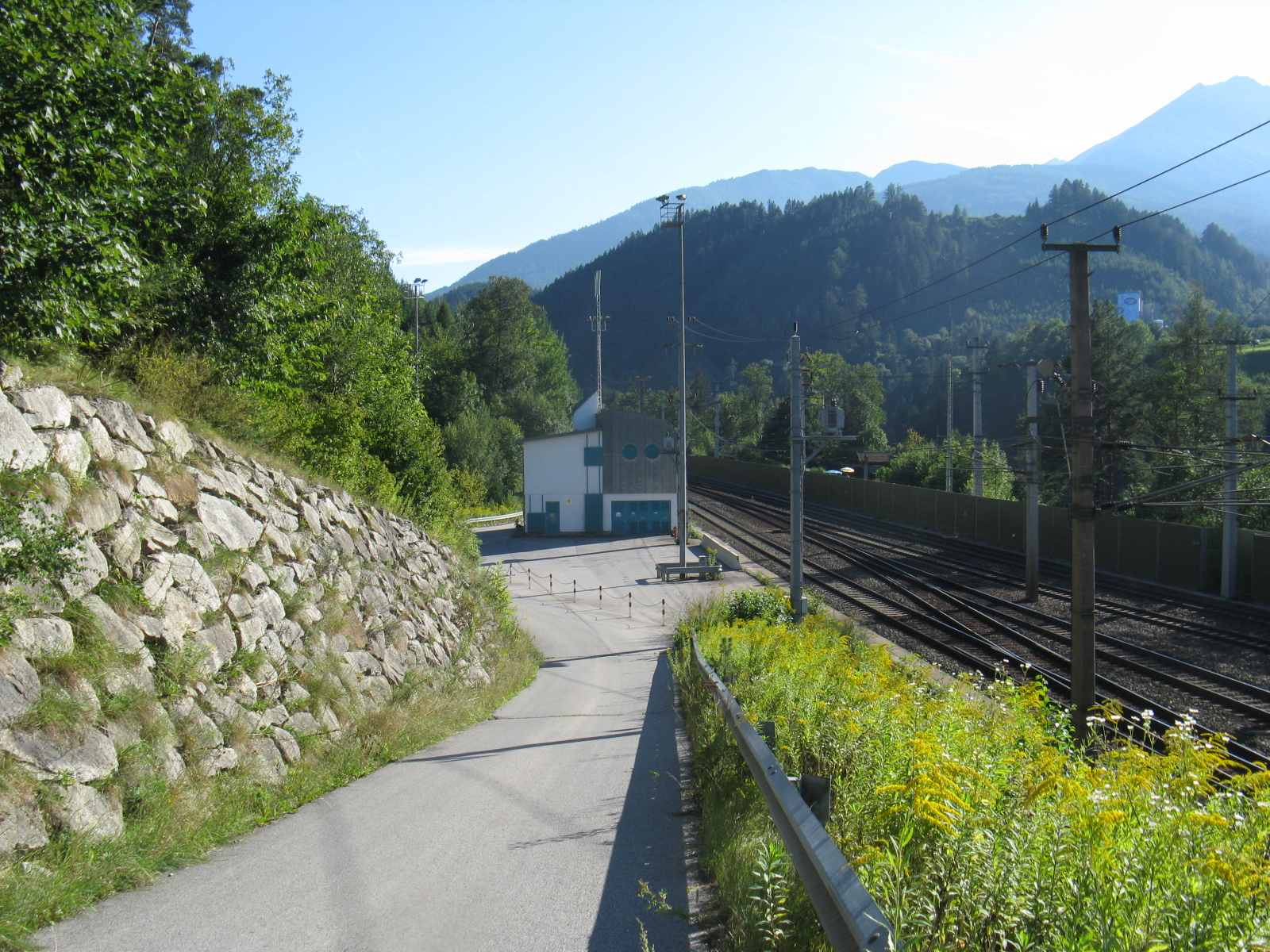
Control room and tunnel rescue site at the south entrance of Inntal tunnel

=== Inntal tunnel ===
The Inntal tunnel is a two line tunnel between Inn Valley and the Wipp valley. With a length of 12.696 kilometres (7.889 mi), it is currently the longest railway tunnel in Austria. It cost approximately €120 million to build.

Construction of the Inn valley tunnel started in September 1989, with tunnelling from both ends. On 12 December 1992 the tunnel was broken through and the tunnel was completed in July 1993. After the track-laying, the wiring of the overhead electrical line and the installation of signalling in the tunnel, operations started on 29 May 1994. The tunnel was built using the New Austrian Tunnelling method. In contrast to other new tunnels, it was not built with slab track but instead is equipped with conventional ballasted track and concrete sleepers.

The excavated cross-section where it is not lined is 95 square metres (1,020 sq ft), where lining was planned it was 108 square metres (1,160 sq ft). The distance between the centres of the tracks is 4.70 m (15 ft 5 in), corresponding with that of high-speed lines.

A cross-over (Üst Fritzens-Wattens 14) was built about halfway through the tunnel at the 9.966 kilometre mark. Immediately after the crossover, a branch in the tunnel was driven to which the two tracks of the planned Brenner Base Tunnel are to be connected. It was built to enable the easy installation of the turnouts and overhead electrification to connect the lines of the base tunnel and the bypass.

=== Innsbruck 1 junction ===
After a short distance in the open air, the bypass line joins the Brenner railway from Innsbruck at the 79.646 km (49.490 mi) mark from the German border at Kufstein. The junction is equipped with eight sets of points and designed so that freight trains can run on and off the branch in both directions simultaneously without slowing down.

== Operations ==
Although the Inntal tunnel is fully equipped with all the required signalling and rescue facilities for the operation of all types of trains, it is used almost exclusively by freight trains, including rolling highway trains. Passenger trains only run on it in exceptional circumstances.

With the exception of Fritzens-Wattens 1 junction, the entire route is controlled from the remote signalling centre at Innsbruck. After completion of the new Innsbruck operations control centre (German: Betriebsfernsteuerzentrale), which is currently under construction, it will control Fritzens-Wattens 1 junction.

Since the bypass joins the Brenner Railway, which has slopes of up to 2.9%, virtually all goods trains need a bank engine, attached to the front. When train loads exceed 1,060 tonnes, a third locomotive is also attached to push the train. Due to local opposition to the construction of a facility for attaching and detaching locomotives in Baumkirchen, this operation has to be carried out in Wörgl terminal north or Wörgl station, requiring an additional journey of up to 44 kilometres per trip.
