= New Lower Inn Valley railway =

Key rail transport link in Western Austria

Coordinates: 47°25′43″N 11°53′43″E

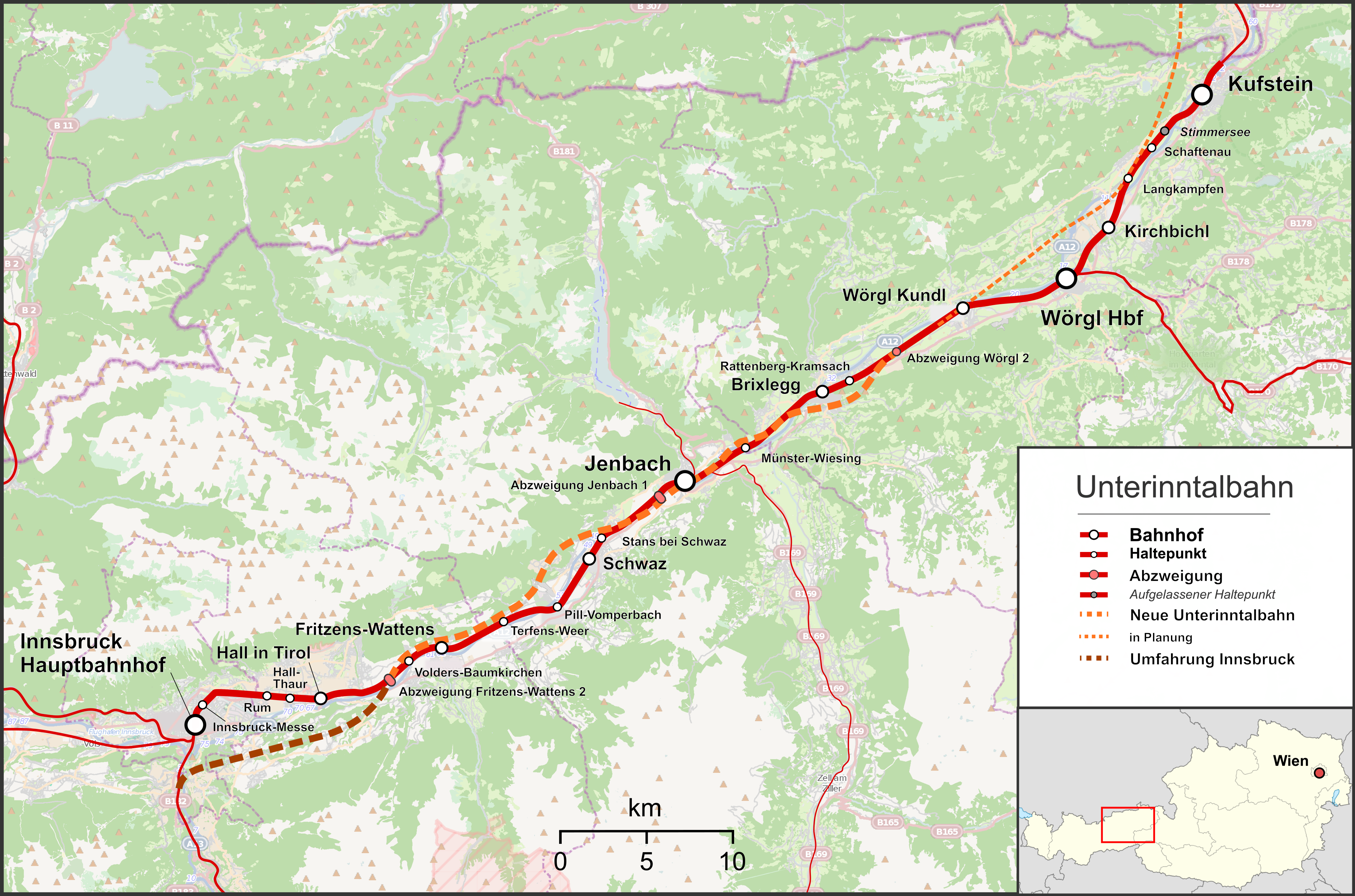

Overview
- Native name: Neue Unterinntalbahn
- Line number: 330 01
- Locale: Austria

Service
- Route number: 300

Technical
- Line length: 40.236 km (25.001 mi)
- Number of tracks: 2
- Track gauge: 1,435 mm (4 ft 8 1/2 in) standard gauge
- Electrification: 15 kV/16.7 Hz AC overhead catenary
- Operating speed: 220 km/h (135 mph)

The New Lower Inn Valley railway (German: Neue Unterinntalbahn) is a partially completed double-track high-speed main line of the Austrian railways. It connects the Brenner railway at Innsbruck and the Innsbruck bypass with the line to Kufstein, connecting with Germany, Salzburg, and eastern Austria. It forms a part of the core of the network of Austrian Federal Railways (ÖBB). The bypass is part of Line 1 of the Trans-European Transport Networks (TEN-T). The first section (Kundl–Baumkirchen), which is designed for speeds up to 220 km/h (140 mph), was opened on 26 November 2012. Since the timetable change on 9 December 2012, it relieves the existing Lower Inn Valley railway between Wörgl and Baumkirchen with trains able to operate at up to 250 km/h (160 mph). In the future, these and other construction projects (including the Brenner Base Tunnel) are expected to reduce travel time on the Munich–Innsbruck route from 1:50 to 0:55 and on the Munich–Verona route from 5:20 to 2:20. The cost of the project amounted to €2.358 billion.

== History ==
The Kundl–Baumkirchen section was opened on 26 December 2012.

== Route: section 1: Kundl-Baumkirchen ==
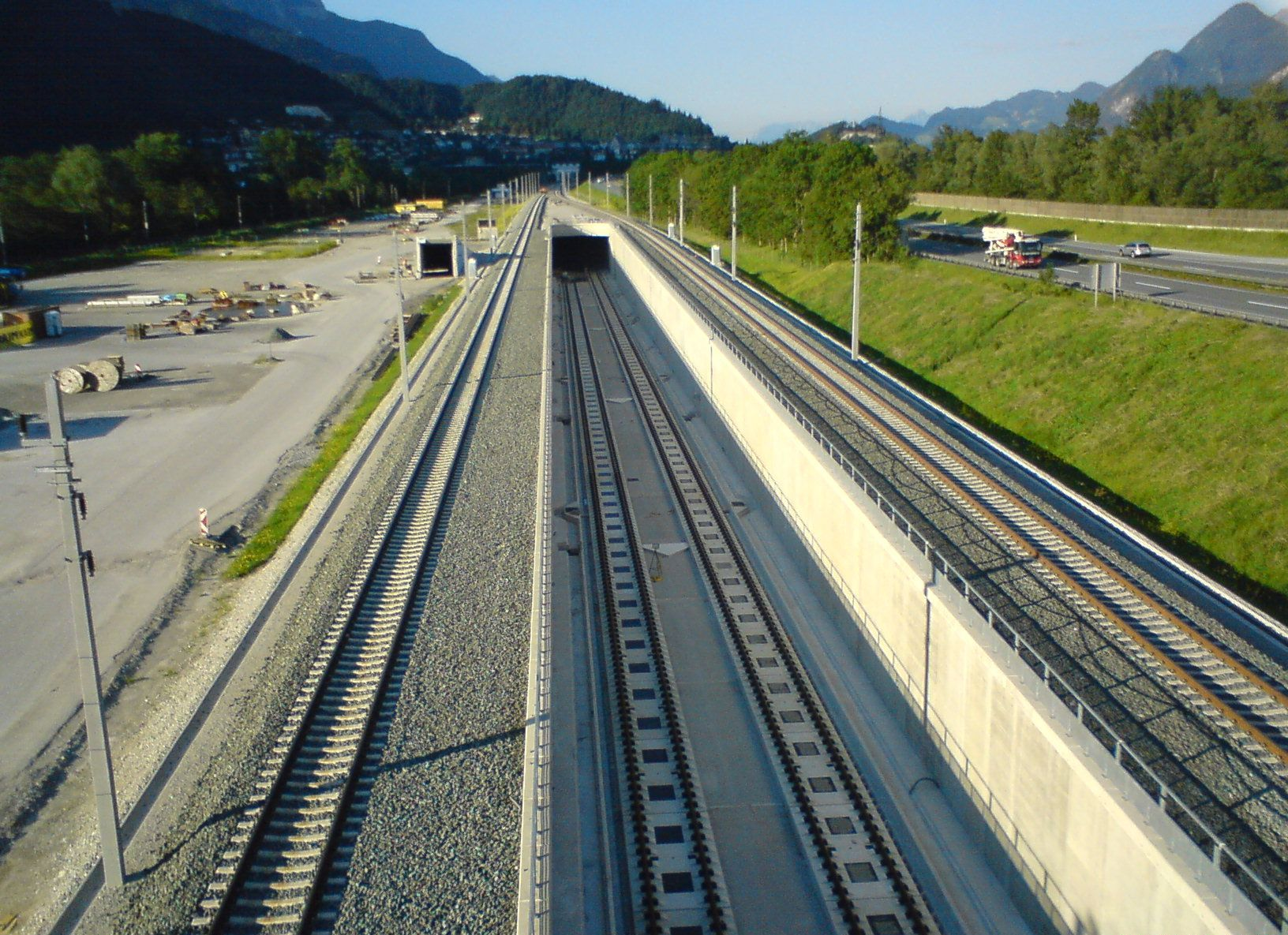
Looking east: the middle tracks are the end of the Münsterer tunnel, part of the Stans link. The outside tracks are the new route of the original line, which has been in operation since 15 August 2011

The line is 40 km (25 mi) long, of which approximately 32 km (20 mi) is in tunnels or deep cuttings. One segment has been made as an upgrade of the original line while the other is an entirely new line:

- The section between Kundl station and the original line is supplemented with a high-capacity line and forms a four-track line to a grade-separated junction at Radfeld.
- The new segment, Radfeld Knot - Baumkirchen Knot, 36 km (22 mi), then descends between the tracks of the existing line and runs to the almost 16 km (9.9 mi) long Münsterer tunnel. After passing under the Inn and Jenbach railway station it continues to the grade-separated junction at Stans. The line descends again, and continues through the 15.8 km (9.8 mi)-long Terfner tunnel. In the tunnel there is space for a planned third track to allow overtaking movements, thus increasing line capacity. After underpassing the Fritzens-Wattens station it joins the old line at Baumkirchen where it separates towards Brenner/Verona via the Innsbruck bypass or towards Innsbruck/Arlberg via the original line.

=== Signalling ===
The new line is fitted with ETCS Level 2 signalling system. Four new electronic interlocking systems were built to control both the new line and the existing line. These systems are remotely controlled from the new Innsbruck operations control centre (Betriebsfernsteuerzentrale).

== Planning: section 2: Brannenburg-Kundl ==
The approximately 25 km (16 mi) section from Brannenburg in Germany to Kundl is currently in the planning phase with route selection between Schaftenau and Kundl having been completed. The continuation of the route into Germany is currently being negotiated.

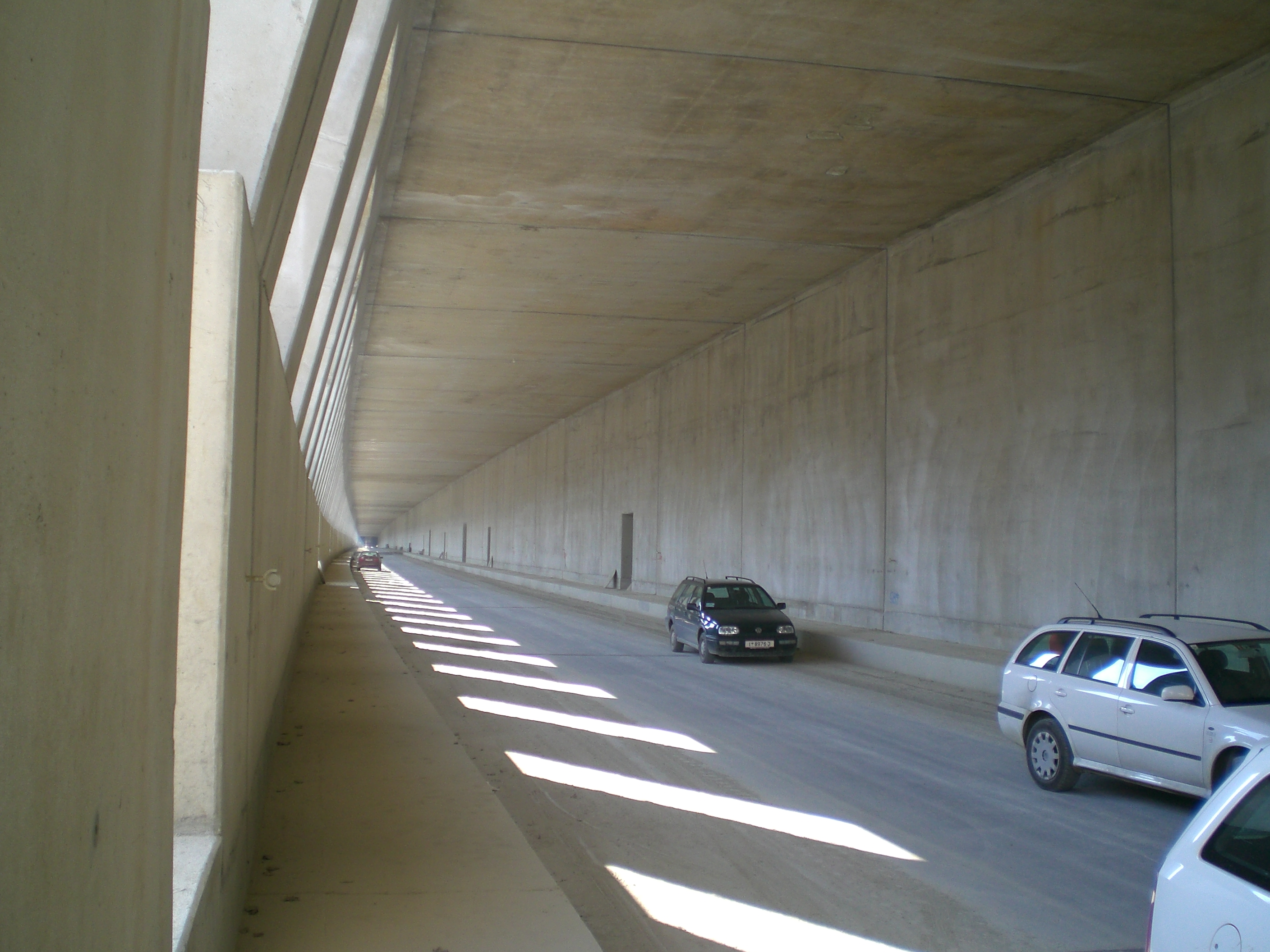
Concrete shell for the new line

The selected route south from Schaftenau would leave the existing line via several short tunnels and cuttings to join the route of the A12 autobahn. It would then run through a nearly 10 km (6.2 mi)-long tunnel under the mountains of the southern Angerbergs and under the Inn, the A12 and the built-up areas of Kundl before emerging between the tracks of the existing line and running to the grade-separated junction at Radfeld.
