= Berlin–Palermo railway axis =

Key high-speed rail link in Central Europe

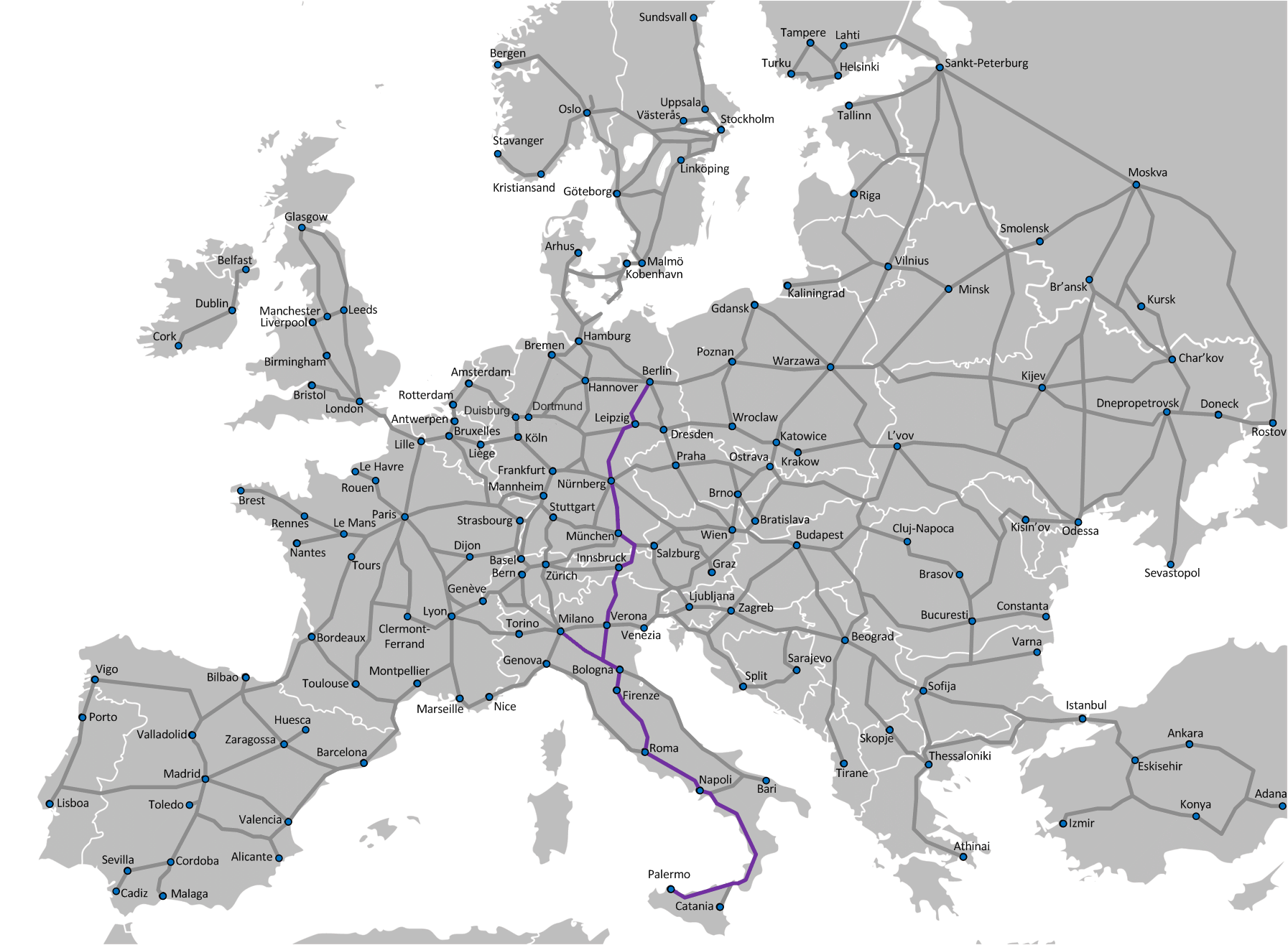
Planned Berlin–Palermo high-speed rail corridor

The Berlin–Palermo railway axis (German: Eisenbahnachse Berlin–Palermo, Italian: Asse ferroviario Berlino-Palermo) is project No. 1 of the Trans-European high-speed rail network (TEN-R), which involves the creation of a 2,200-kilometre-long (1,400 mi) high-speed rail line between Berlin and Palermo. It is designated as one of the main transport links connecting Central and Southern Europe, tracking through Germany, Austria and Italy.

== Alignment and sections ==
From Berlin the line will run to the Central German Metropolitan Region of Halle/Leipzig, to Erfurt and to Southern Germany at Nuremberg, Ingolstadt and Munich. Crossing the border with Austria, it will continue through the state of Tyrol along Kufstein, Wörgl and the capital Innsbruck. It will enter Italian South Tyrol, passing Franzensfeste and Bolzano, run through Northeast Italy via Verona and Bologna, through Central Italy along Florence and Rome, and reach Southern Italy at Naples and finally shall cross the proposed Strait of Messina Bridge over to Messina and Palermo in Sicily.

=== Germany ===
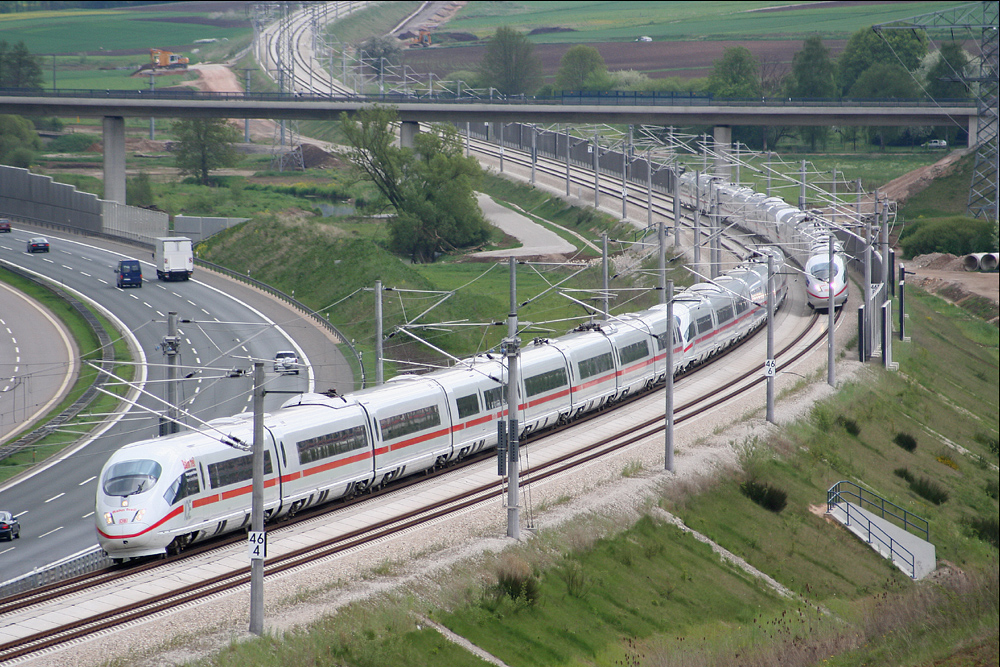
Two ICE 3-trains running on the Nuremberg–Ingolstadt high-speed railway, parallel to the BAB 9 near Greding

The corridor begins at Berlin Hauptbahnhof opened in 2006 and runs via the rebuilt Anhalt Railway (up to Bitterfeld) and Dessau–Leipzig railway to Leipzig Hauptbahnhof. The line shall continue to Erfurt Hauptbahnhof on the Erfurt–Leipzig/Halle high-speed railway, which opened in December 2015. Likewise, the southern continuation of this route along the Nuremberg–Erfurt high-speed railway opened in December 2017.

In the meantime, service is provided by tilting ICE T trains running on sections of the Leipzig–Großkorbetha railway, the Thuringian Railway, and the winding Saal Railway via Jena Paradies station, bypassing Erfurt on their way from Leipzig to Nürnberg Hauptbahnhof. From Saalfeld station they cross the Rennsteig ridge of the Franconian Forest via the Leipzig–Probstzella railway and the Franconian Forest Railway and continue along the Bamberg–Hof railway (from Hochstadt-Marktzeuln) and the Nuremberg–Bamberg railway

Further to the south, the corridor runs via the Nuremberg–Ingolstadt high-speed railway line opened to Ingolstadt Hauptbahnhof in 2006 and the Ingolstadt–Munich line to München Hauptbahnhof. The following section of the Munich–Rosenheim railway has already been upgraded to four-tracks up to Grafing station in order to separate mainline and suburban traffic. The Rosenheim–Kufstein railway that continues to the Austrian border and Kufstein station is proposed to get a bypass as part of the Brenner northern access.

=== Austria ===
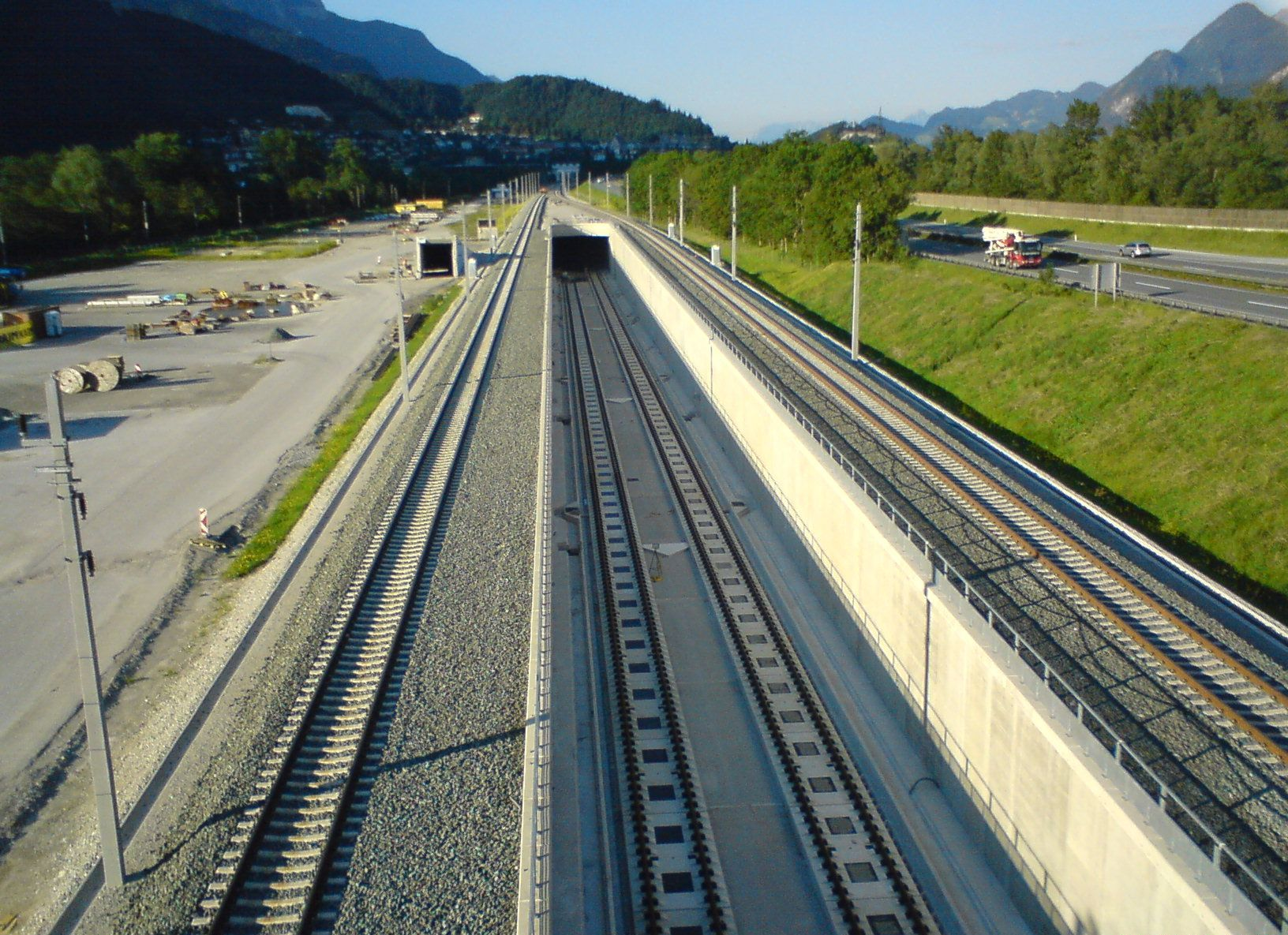
New Lower Inn Valley railway

The heart of the Austrian section is the New Lower Inn Valley railway through the Tyrolean Unterland region. In particular the section between Wörgl and Baumkirchen is the most congested line of the whole TEN-network, a result of the Austrian national east-west traffic and the international north-south traffic sharing the same line. The largest section from Kundl to Baumkirchen is already completed and in operation since December 2012. The shorter section between Kundl and Kufstein (or Brannenburg in Bavaria), including a Wörgl bypass, is being planned. The Austrian section trains will be able to operate at up to 250 kilometres per hour (160 mph).

At the Baumkirchen rail hub, new high-speed curves link with the Innsbruck bypass including the Inn Valley tunnel (German: Inntaltunnel), which is already used by freight trains, but still needs to be upgraded for passengers and connected with the existing Lower Inn Valley Railway for trains calling at Innsbruck Hauptbahnhof. The Inn Valley tunnel will connect directly with the future Brenner Base Tunnel (Italian: Galleria di base del Brennero) bypassing the existing Brenner Railway across the Alpine divide up to the southern portal at Fortezza in Alto Adige, Italy. Construction of the main bore on the Austrian side began on 19 March 2015. The combined Inn Valley and Brenner Base tunnels will be the longest railway tunnel in the world (62.8 kilometres (39.0 mi)).

=== Italy ===
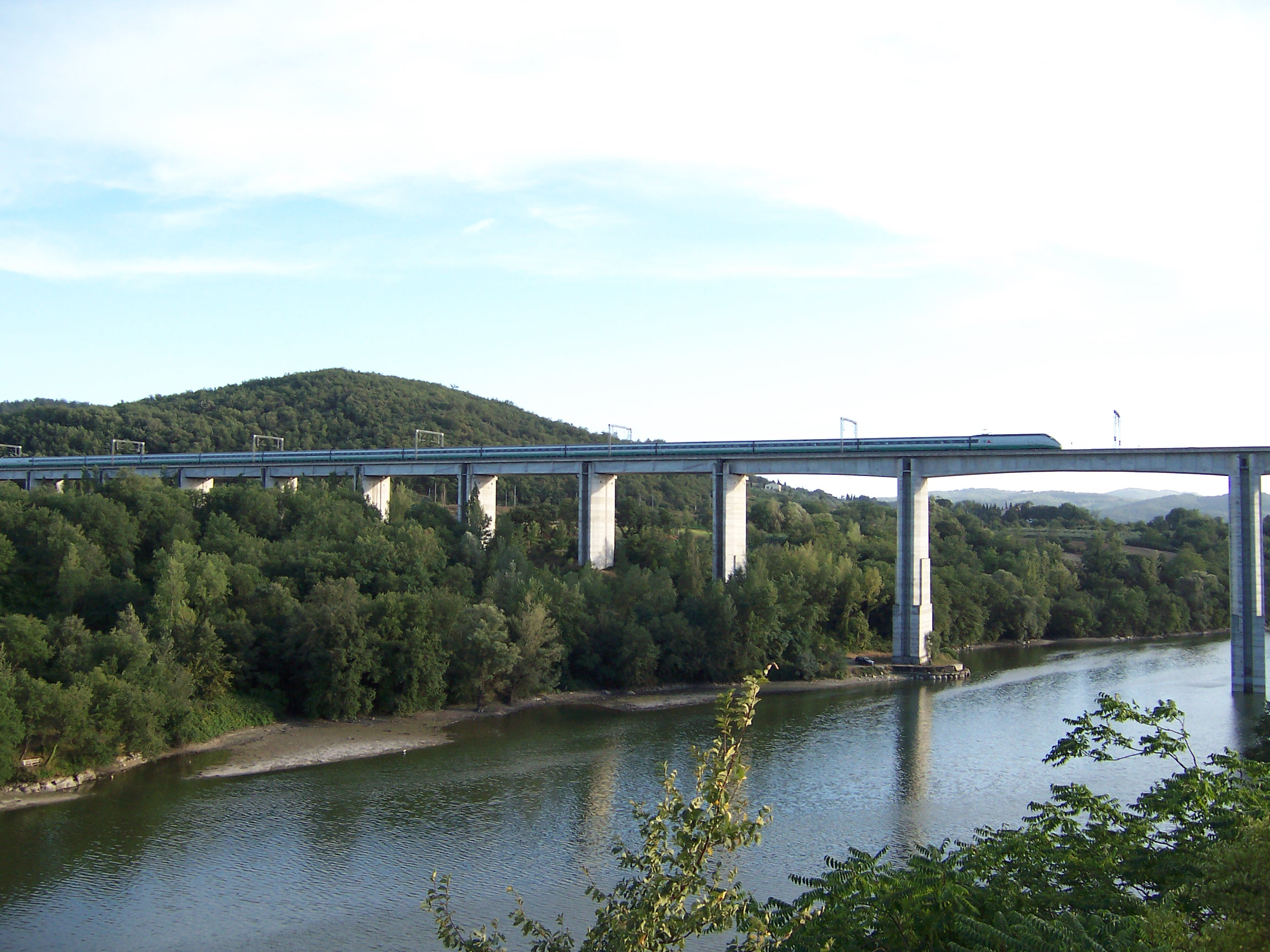
An ETR 500 train running on the Florence–Rome high-speed line near Arezzo, the first high-speed railway opened in Europe.

From the southern portal of the Brenner Base Tunnel at Fortezza, an upgrade of the 189 km (117 mi) long Brenner Railway section to Verona Porta Nuova is planned, bypassing Brixen/Bressanone and Bolzano/Bozen. In the course of several high-speed rail projects, the following lines have been built or significantly upgraded in Italy:

- In 2009 work was completed on duplicating the Verona–Bologna line and upgrading it for 200-kilometre-per-hour (120 mph) speeds, including several deviations.
- The Milan–Bologna high-speed line (215 kilometres (134 mi)) was opened on 13 December 2008.
- The Bologna–Florence high-speed line (78 kilometres (48 mi)) was opened on 13 December 2009.
- The Florence–Rome high-speed line (254 kilometres (158 mi)) was completed on 26 May 1992.
- The Rome–Naples high-speed line was partially opened on 19 December 2005 and completely on 13 December 2009.
- The Naples–Salerno high-speed line was opened in June 2008.

Since the 2000s, a Strait of Messina Bridge to Sicily has been proposed several times. In 2003, the second Berlusconi government announced the construction of a combined rail/road bridge with a length of 3.3 kilometres (2.1 mi). The project was halted by a resolution of the Chamber of Deputies in October 2006, resumed upon Berlusconi's re-election in 2008, and again discontinued in March 2013. In March 2023, the Meloni government resumed the project. On the mainland, an upgrade of the 400-kilometre (250 mi) Salerno–Reggio Calabria line is also proposed to increase speeds and capacity. In Sicily, the long railway line from Messina to Catania Centrale and Palermo Centrale is being substantially upgraded to increase speeds and capacity.

== EU coordinator ==
On 20 July 2005, the European Union appointed coordinators for the five major trans-European rail transport projects to accelerate the realisation of these projects. It appointed the Belgian Karel Van Miert to coordinate the Berlin–Palermo rail corridor, who upon his death in June 2009 was succeeded by the Irish Pat Cox.

== See also ==
- Main Line for Europe
- Scandinavian–Mediterranean Corridor
- Helsinki-Valletta Corridor
- Trans-European corridors
- Trans-European Transport Network
