= Brenner Base Tunnel =

Railway under construction through the Alps

Coordinates: 47°3′24″N 11°29′59″E

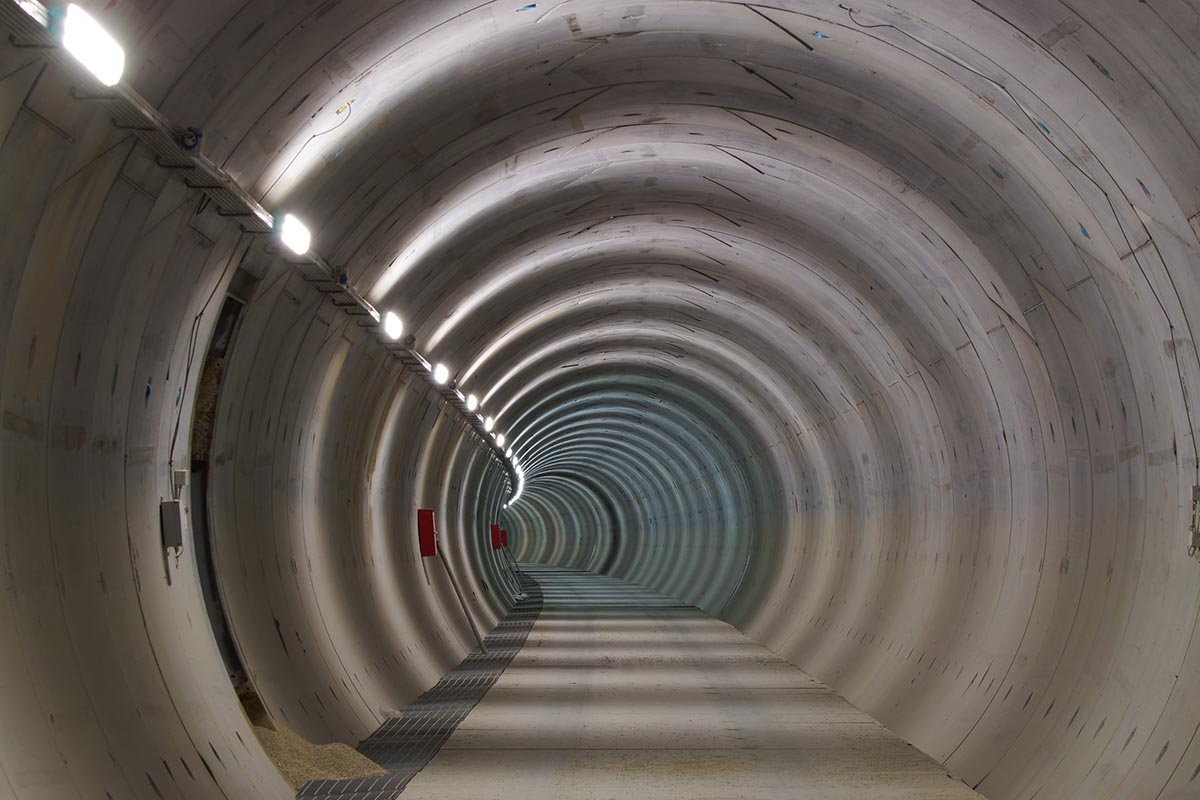
- Exploratory Tunnel Aica–Mules

Overview
- Location: Brenner Pass
- Status: Under construction
- System: Brenner railway
- Start: Innsbruck, Austria
- End: Franzensfeste, Italy

Operation
- Work began: 2008
- Constructed: 2007–present
- Opened: 2034 (scheduled)
- Traffic: Freight trains and passenger trains
- Character: Twin tube Passenger and freight Third exploratory tunnel

Technical
- Length: 64 km (40 mi)
- No. of tracks: Double track
- Track gauge: 1,435 mm (4 ft 8 1/2 in) standard gauge
- Electrified: Electrified; 15 kV 16.7 Hz AC (Austria); 25 kV 50 Hz AC (Italy)
- Operating speed: Passenger: 250 km/h (155 mph); Freight: 120 km/h (75 mph)
- Max elevation: 840 metres (2,760 ft)
- Tunnel clearance: 8.1 metres (27 ft)
- Grade: Austria 7.4/1000; Italy 5/1000

Route map
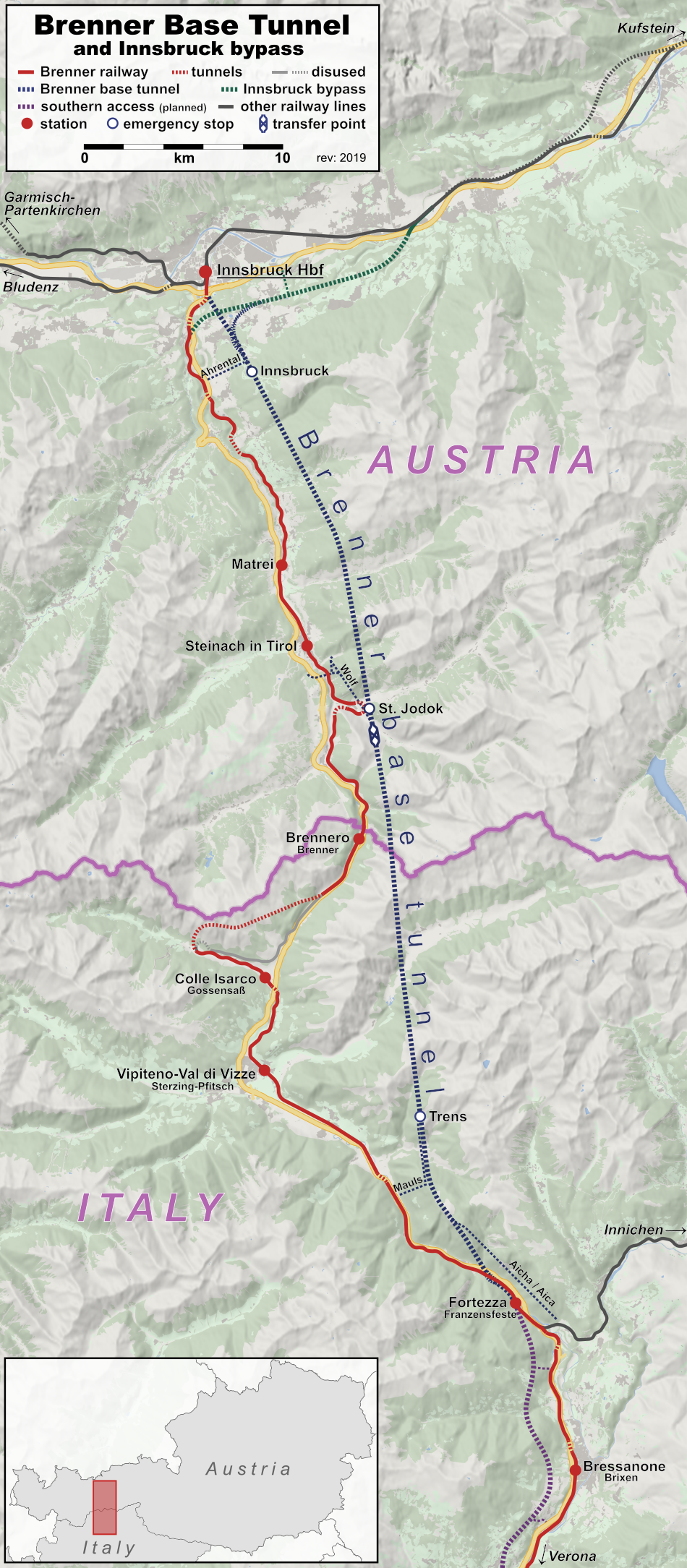

The Brenner Base Tunnel (German: Brennerbasistunnel; Italian: Galleria di base del Brennero) is a 55-kilometre-long (34 mi) railway tunnel under construction through the base of the Eastern Alps beneath the Brenner Pass. Once completed, the Brenner Base Tunnel will rank as either the second or third longest railway tunnel in the world, depending on the definition employed. It will be surpassed in length only by the Gotthard Base Tunnel in Switzerland and, depending on the relative completion dates of these projects, the Mont d'Ambin Base Tunnel between France and Italy. When combined with the Inntal Tunnel, which forms part of the existing Innsbruck bypass, the Brenner Base Tunnel will reach a length of 64 kilometres (40 mi), making it the longest underground railway connection in the world.

It will run from near Innsbruck, in Austria, to Franzensfeste/Fortezza, in Italy, replacing part of the current Brenner railway. The line is part of Line 1, the Berlin to Palermo route, of Trans-European Transport Networks (TEN-T) and funded by Austria and Italy with large contributions by the European Union. The tunnel is scheduled to be completed in 2032. On 28 October 2026, it was announced that the opening date would be pushed back to 2034.

The Brenner Pass, in the Alps at the border between Austria and Italy, is one of the most important traffic connections between northern and southern Europe, and the motorway going over it is infamous for its frequent traffic jams. Pollution from transit traffic is a major concern because of the combination of temperature inversion with the narrow shape of the valleys leading to the pass.

The goal is to relieve this situation by greatly improving the railway connection between Germany and Italy with the new tunnel, which will allow trains to cross the Alps much faster. Currently, speeds in the Brenner region barely exceed 70 km/h (43 mph) due to the steepness of the existing tracks, which cross the pass at an elevation of 1,371 metres (4,498 ft) above sea level.

The travel time from Innsbruck to Bolzano will be reduced from current 2 hours to just 50 minutes.

As of November 2026, at least 6 workers died while working on the tunnel.

== Background ==
The passenger and freight traffic across the Alps has increased greatly in recent years and further growth is forecast. Austria is a key country in movement of freight between northern and southern Europe and between eastern and western Europe. The Brenner region is very politically sensitive with respect to both local and cross-border transport issues. Between 1970 and 1999, highway freight increased seven-fold. (3 million to 22 million tonnes) In 1990, 70% of the freight from eastern Europe was transported by rail and the remainder by trucks. These proportions were expected to reverse by 2010. About three-quarters of traffic through the Brenner Pass is currently carried by road transport. Local residents have long fought for relief from the associated pollution. The construction of a rail tunnel is considered by its proponents to be necessary for a shift of freight traffic from road to rail.

The railway line from Innsbruck in North Tyrol to Bolzano in South Tyrol was built between 1860 and 1867. Tight curve radii and gradients of up to 2.6% complicate rail operations. However, improvements on the Italian side in recent years to the existing line, which were completed in late 2008, allow the line theoretically to accommodate 240 trains per day. The grades were not significantly improved.

The new Brenner line would have a maximum gradient of 0.4%–0.7%. Thus, a locomotive would be capable of hauling more than double the weight. The new line (the base tunnel together with the southern approach from Waidbruck/Ponte Gardena to Franzensfeste/Fortezza) would cut travel time between Innsbruck and Bolzano from about two hours today to less than half that.

== Project ==
=== Main tunnel ===
The 55-kilometre (34 mi) long, twin-tube tunnel begins in the Innsbruck suburb of Wilten and penetrates the Alps reaching a height of about 840 metres (2,760 ft) above sea level (ASL). The tunnel will be up to 1,720 m (5,640 ft) below the surface at its deepest point in the gneiss section stretching south from the Italian border. Since under the most recent plan the tunnel starts as a twin-tube tunnel, the junction already prepared in the Inntal tunnel on the Innsbruck bypass will not be used. Instead, a diversion with several branches is planned.

The volume of rock to be excavated during the construction of the tunnel is estimated at 21 million cubic metres (740 million cubic feet), of which approximately 60% will be incurred in Austria, as about 60% of the tunnel will be in Austria. A part of the spoil will be used as fill for the approach lines and another part of the spoil material is used to produce the concrete segment for the final lining of the tunnel. The main tunnels will have a circular cross section with a diameter of approx. 8.1 m (27 ft).

According to current planning the apex of the tunnel will be at the border at an altitude of about 810 m (2,660 ft) ASL, although an apex farther south would have been lower. The placing of the apex at the border is set out in the treaty between Austria and Italy. As justification for this choice it is stated that this will allow Austrian water to run in the tunnel to Austria and Italian water to Italy.

=== Northern approach ===
On its north end, the base tunnel (BBT) has two entrances, which must go underground a few kilometres before the junction with the main tunnels, and will also be built as part of the BBT. One route leads from the main Innsbruck station under Bergisel and the other connects with the Innsbruck bypass. This route adds about 8 kilometres (5.0 mi) more to the length of the tunnel than the Innsbruck station route; with it included, the BBT, at 62.7 kilometres (39.0 mi), would become the longest continuous railroad tunnel in the world. However, if the Axentunnel extension is added to the Gotthard Base Tunnel, its length would become 75 kilometres (47 mi), allowing it to reclaim the 'longest tunnel' title.

The northern approach from Munich within Germany is the 165 kilometres (103 mi) Grafing–Rosenheim–Kufstein route. The "Brenner Nordzulauf" (Brenner northern link) project aims to construct a high-speed line for speeds of up to 230 km/h (143 mph) between Grafing and Brannenburg in addition to the existing line, adapting the route's capacity to the projected increase as a result of the BBT. The project has reached in-depth planning stages but suffers from lacking support by locals. A more direct route between Munich and Innsbruck, for example, via Garmisch-Partenkirchen, Mittenwald and Seefeld was not pursued, though it could have shortened the Munich Innsbruck line to 129 kilometres (80 mi).

In Austria, a new double-track high-speed line supplements the Lower Inn Valley railway between Wörgl and Baumkirchen. It manages to cut travel time between Munich and Innsbruck from 1:50 via the old tracks to merely 0:55 using the high-speed line. About 32 kilometres (20 mi) of the 40-kilometre (25 mi) line through the Lower Inn Valley (Unterinntal) is built underground, in troughs, or under snow sheds. Noise and vibration mitigation is accomplished by the use of 80,000 square metres (860,000 sq ft) of elastomer in a mass-spring system. The segment's track superstructure is load class E5. It is capable of handling 260–300 trains per day. This section was opened on 9 December 2012. Planning is under way on the continuation of this line to the German border at Brannenburg.

=== Southern approach ===
On the south end, the base tunnel will be connected to a 180 kilometres (110 mi) new line all the way to Verona with junctions with the old railway and no stations (similarly to the Neue Unterinntalbahn). Planning of the new line started around 2000 and the project was divided in seven, later eight, sections mostly underground (about 90%); first route plans of the new railway were approved in 2009. As of 2026 two sections are already under construction with three more deemed "high priority" for their role in routing traffic to the new base tunnel; other three sections were assessed not critical for the base tunnel operations.

The construction lots are (status as of January 2026):

- High priority
  - 1 - Fortezza/Franzenfeste-Ponte Gardena/Waidbruck: Construction started in 2021
  - 2 - Bolzano/Bozen bypass: Final planning stages
  - 3A - Trento bypass: Construction started in 2023
  - 3B - Rovereto bypass: Route under review
  - 4 - Verona north gateway: Tendering phase
- Low priority
  - 5 - Bolzano/Bozen-Trento
  - 6 - Rovereto-Verona
  - 7 - Ponte Gardena-Bolzano

== History ==
The Brenner tunnel is the most important link in the Berlin–Palermo railway axis, a series of projects that will create a single railway line from Berlin in Germany to Palermo in Sicily. In April 2003, the governments of Austria and Italy signed an agreement to build the tunnel.

=== Schedule history ===
Early in the preliminary planning, at a Brussels meeting in June 2005, BBT SE (Brenner Base Tunnel Societas Europae), presented an interim status report. Expectations following the meeting were that the project could be finalized and the pilot tunnel started by 2006. The target for the tunnel to start service was 2015.

In 2007 a construction timeline with a 2022 finish date was specified in a memorandum signed by the Austrian and Italian ministers of transport.

=== Funding history ===
In December 2008 Antonio Tajani, the European commissioner for transport, approved funds totalling €1.7 billion to finance 11 railway projects that together should establish two major routes across the continent.

In May 2009 it was confirmed that final go-ahead for the project had been given.

The final estimated cost was put at €8.384 billion at 2018 levels.

=== Construction history ===
In the summer of 2007 work started on a pilot tunnel to run along the line of the future tunnel and to be used for removing water and spoil during the major construction phase. Construction of the pilot tunnel between 2006 and 2009 was estimated to cost €430 million and would be 50% EU funded.

On 6 July 2019, two Austrian segments were connected, and an unbroken 36 kilometres (22 mi) long tunnel was formed – around 65% of the tunnel's 55 kilometres (34 mi) projected length. On 18 September 2025 for the first time the two tunnel sections, from Italy and from Austria, were joined underground by the break-through of the exploratory tunnel. The exploratory tunnel runs 12 metres below where the final tunnel will be bored and it will be used for drainage and maintenance after the rail connection opens.

The exploratory tunnel broke through the last layer of rock on 18 September 2025. The two main tunnels were completed almost simultaneously at 10:35 on 29 July 2026.

== Design ==
The final design will consist of two tunnels, 55 kilometres (34 mi) long. A centre tunnel 12 metres (39 ft) below the two primary tunnels will be used during construction as a guide tunnel to determine geological conditions, and later for drainage and emergency access. There will be a cross over between the tunnels every 333 metres (1,093 ft). Multi-function stations will be located at Trens (in Freienfeld), St. Jodok, and a third station towards the northern end of the tunnel to provide operational and emergency services. ETCS Level 2 will be installed to provide train control.

== Funding ==
As the transalpine stretch of the SCAN-MED Corridor, the Brenner Base Tunnel receives substantial funding from the European Union. Between 2015 and 2023, 50% of the costs for the exploratory tunnel (about 330 million Euro) and 40% of the costs for the two main tunnels (about 880 million Euro) were covered by the EU. Austria and Italy will each cover half of the remaining costs.

The 2017 estimate of the basic costs for the Brenner Base Tunnel was 7.8 billion Euro. Considering the planned end date for the project (2028), the estimate total costs, with risk provision and adjustment for inflation are about 8.384 billion Euro. They can be divided into 4 large categories: 60% of the cost comes from the engineering works, 15% is for outfitting, 10% is for planning, services and internal costs, 1% for parcels of land and related issues and 14% for risk provision.

== Specifications ==
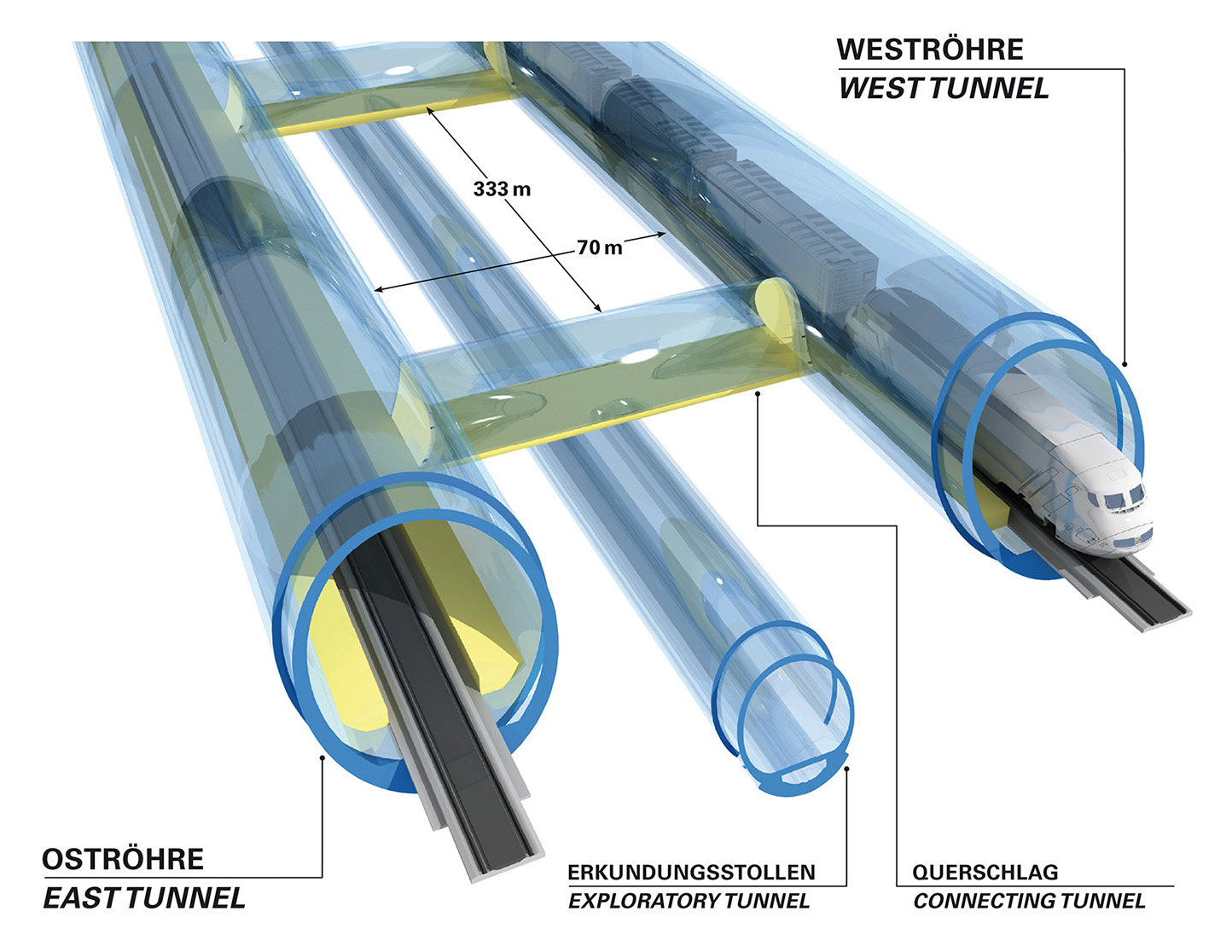
Cutaway view of the Brenner Base Tunnel

- Total tunnel length from the Innsbruck bypass to Fortezza/Franzensfeste: 64 km (39.768 mi)
- Length from the Innsbruck portal to the Fortezza/Franzensfeste portal: 55 km (34.175 mi)
- Diameter of each of the single-track tubes: 8.1 m (27 ft)
- Distance between cross passage tunnels: 333 m (1,093 ft)
- Elevation at highest point: 794 m (2,605 ft)
- Maximum overburden: 1,720 m (5,640 ft)
- Start of construction: 1999 (preparations), 2007 (exploratory section), 2011 (main tunnel)
- End of construction: 2034
- Total cost: €8.384 billion
- Electrification System:
  - 15 kV 16.7 Hz AC (Austrian side)
  - 25 kV 50 Hz AC (Italian side)
- Control and command system: ETCS Level 2
- Operating speed: 250 km/h (155 mph) for passenger trains and 160 km/h (99 mph) for freight trains

== Gallery ==
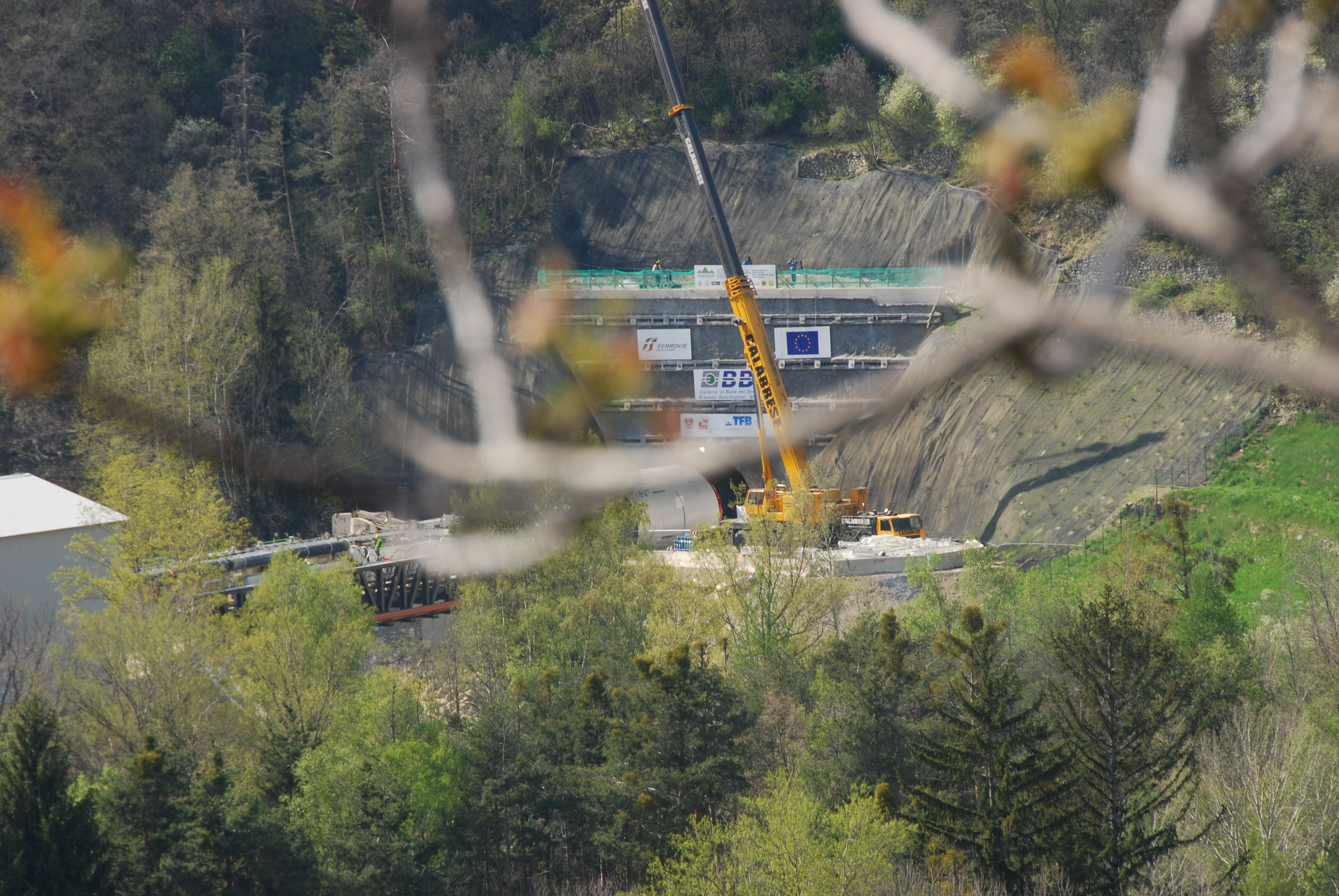
Start of the TBM at Aicha construction site in April 2008

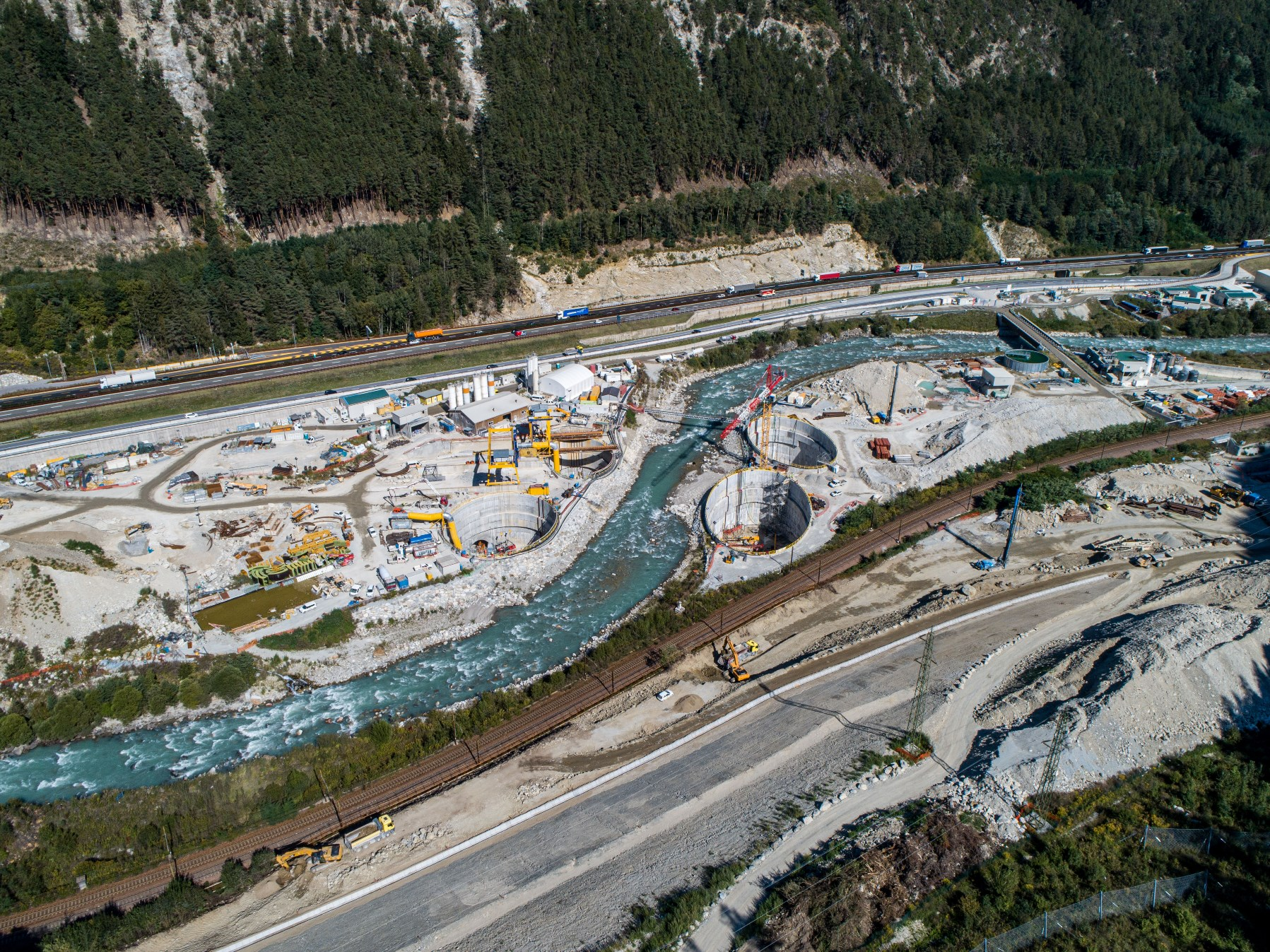
View of the Eisack underpass construction site in September of 2019

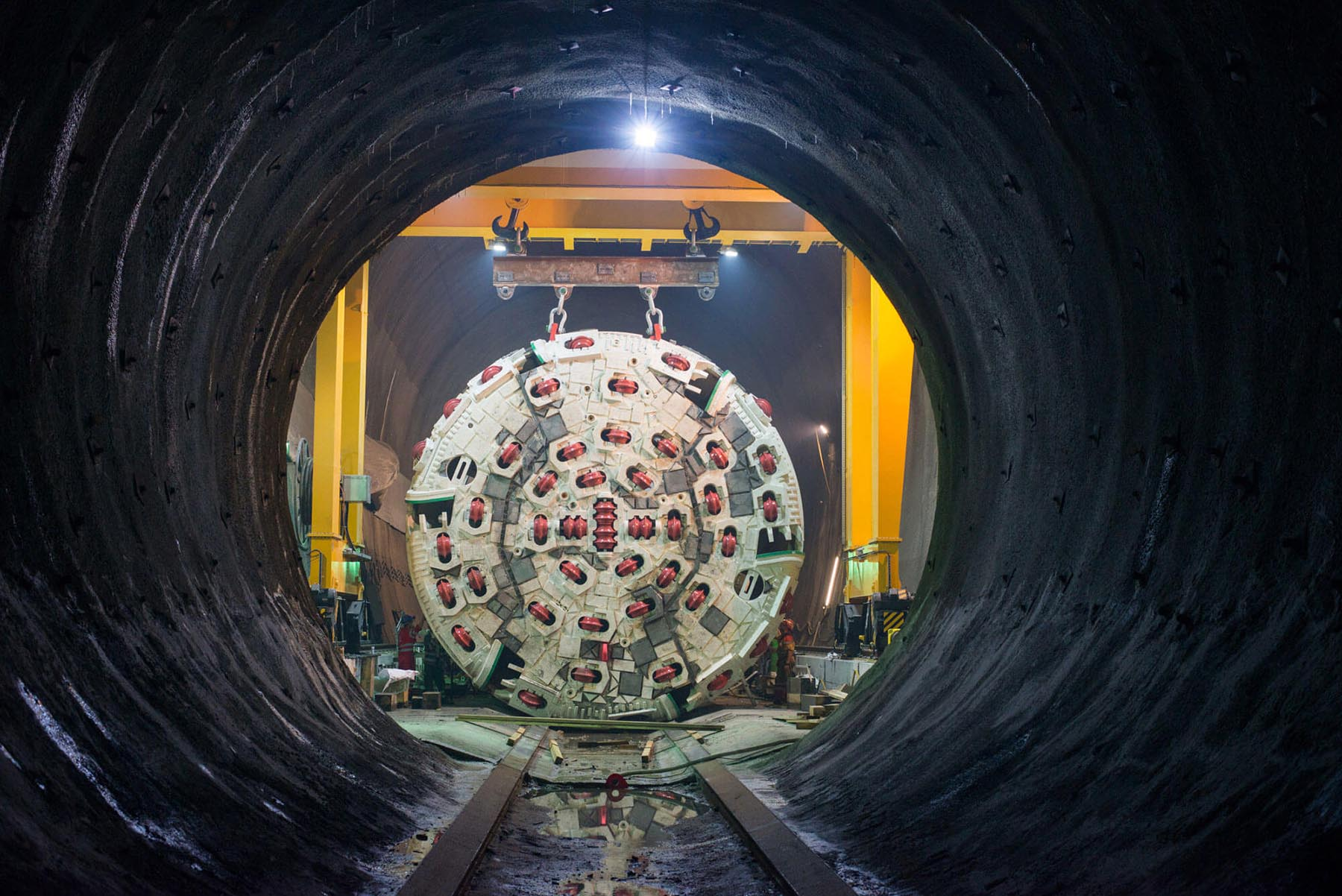
TBM at the Ahrental–Pfons exploratory tunnel

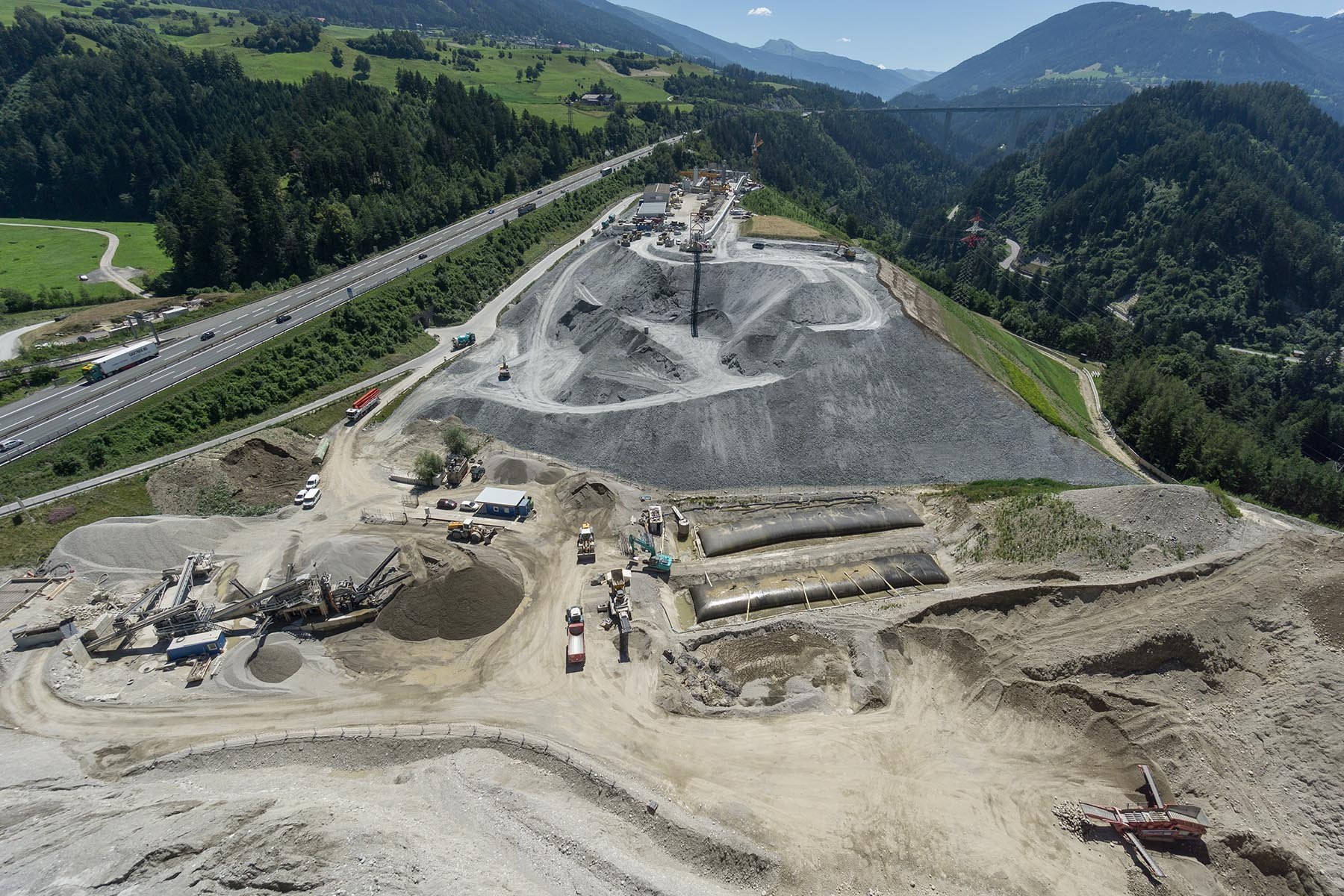
Excavation material processing plant and depot in Ahrental in July 2016

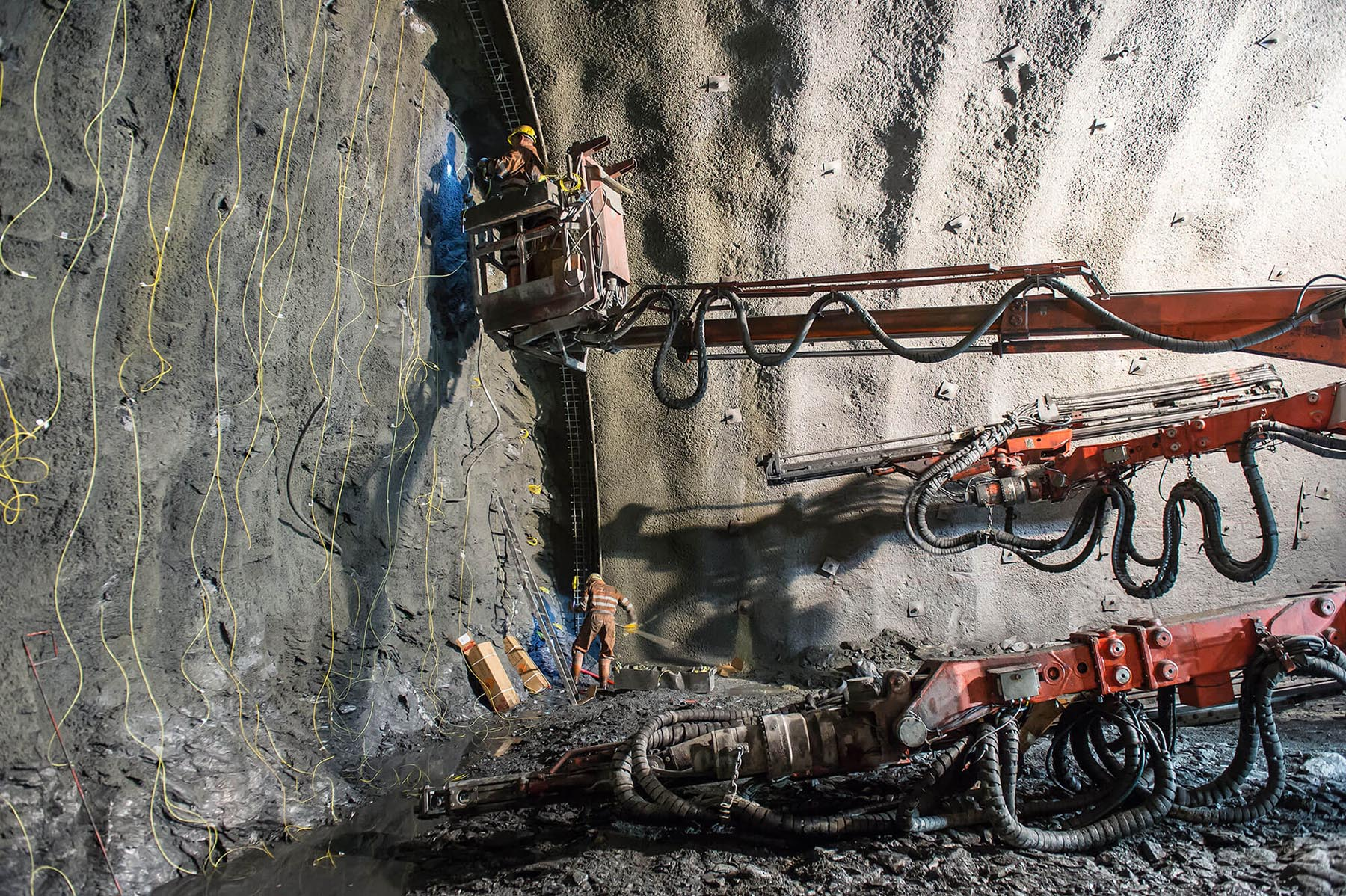
Loading explosive for blasting the Wolf access tunnel

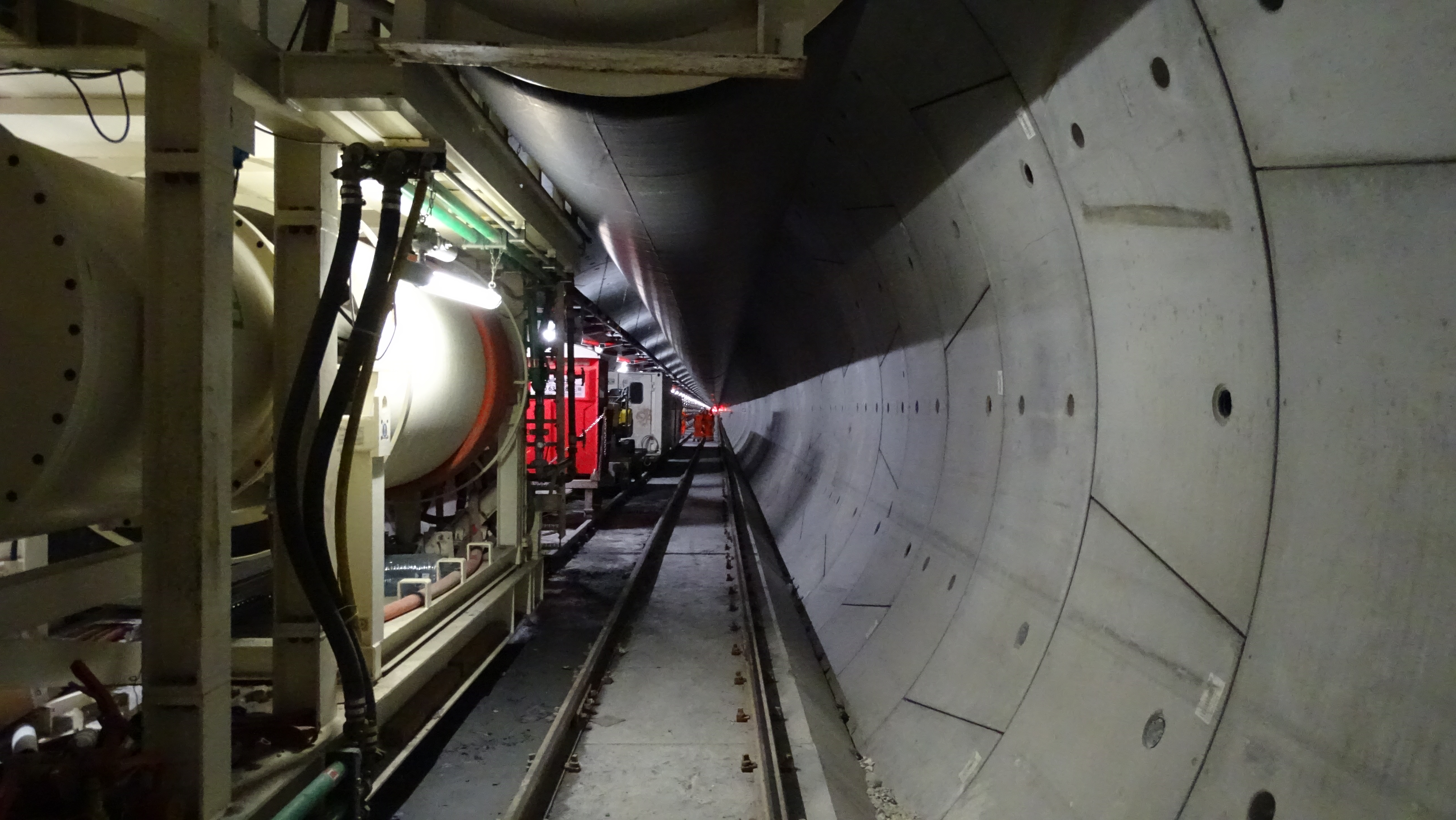
Open shield TBM excavating the exploratory tunnel near Mauls/Mules

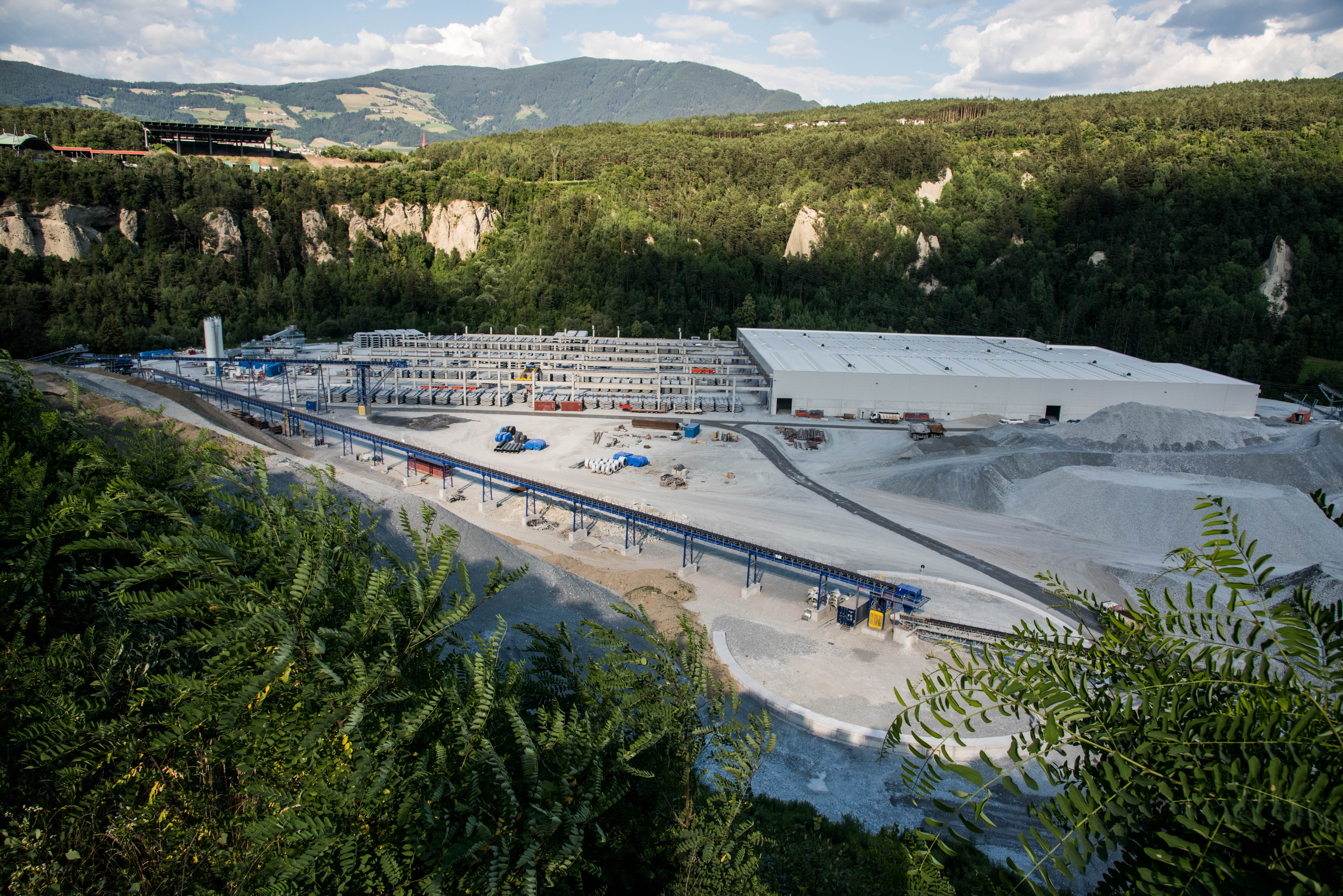
Hinterrigger concrete lining factory in June 2018

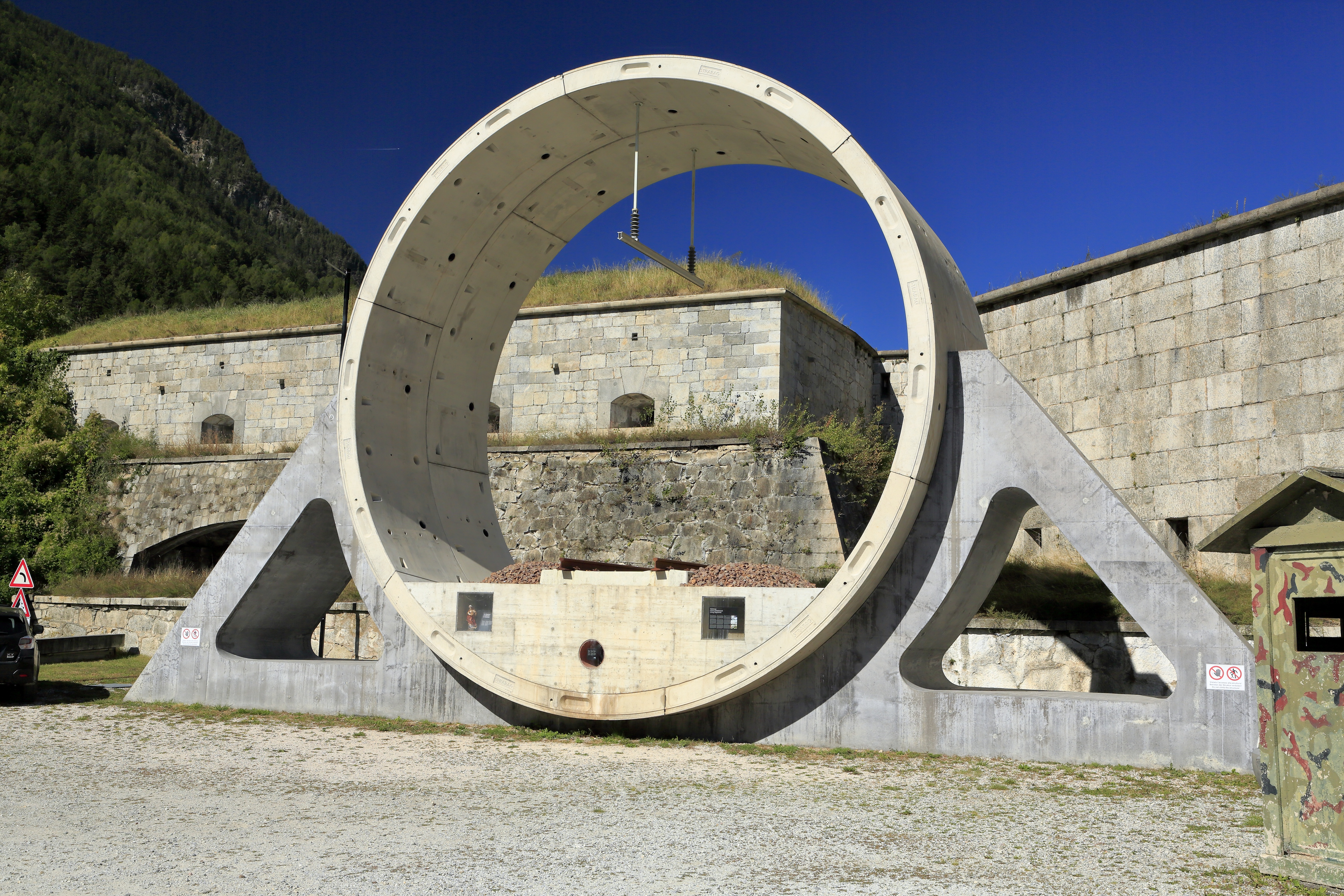
Example of a tunnel section at the Franzenfeste info point

== See also ==
- NRLA
- Austrian Federal Railways
- High-speed rail in Italy
- Lyon Turin Ferroviaire
- Megaproject
- Treno Alta Velocità
