= Rosenheim–Kufstein railway =

Double-track main line in Germany

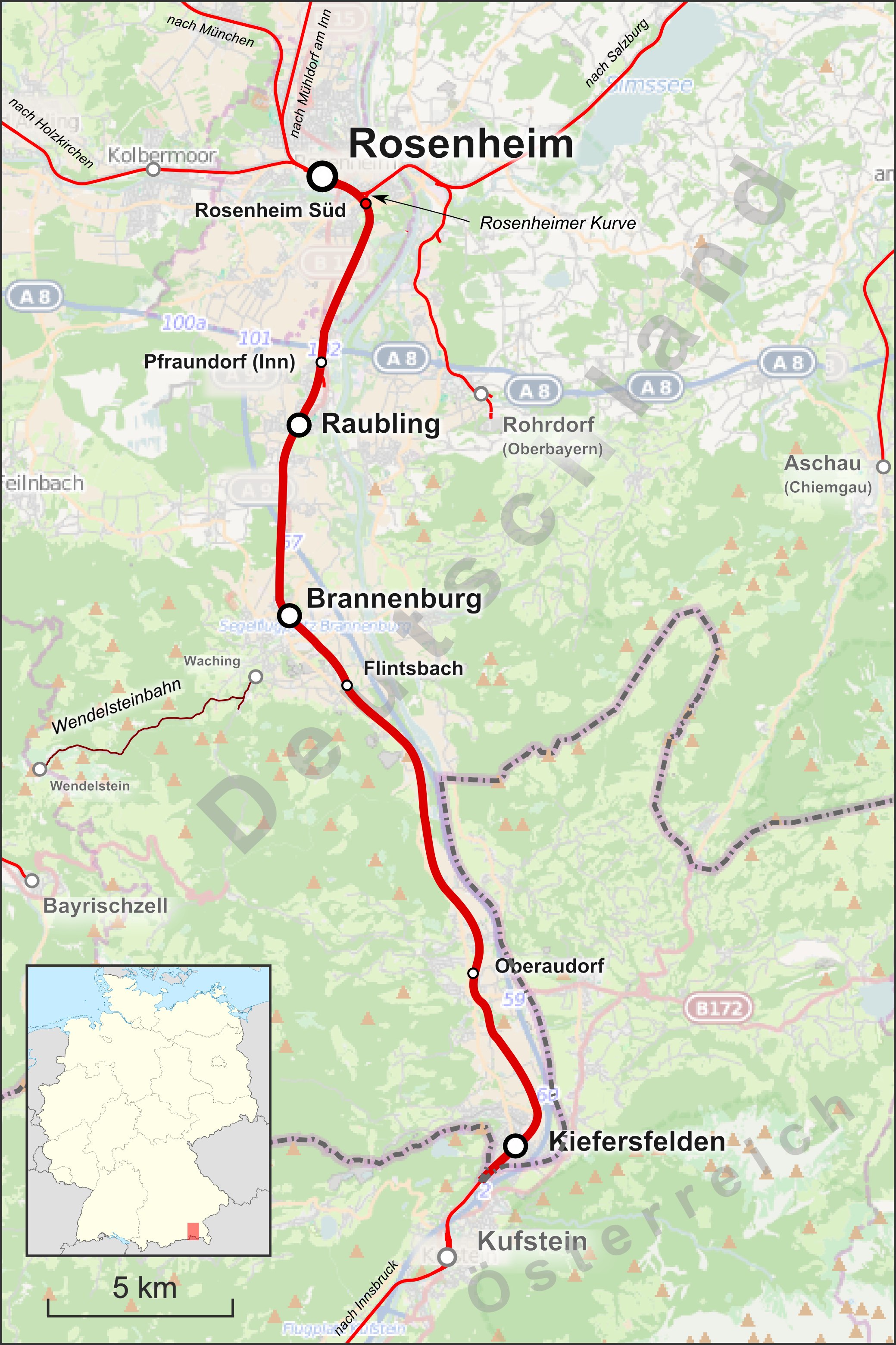

Overview
- Native name: Bahnstrecke Rosenheim– Staatsgrenze bei Kufstein
- Status: Operational
- Owner: Deutsche Bahn
- Line number: 5702
- Locale: Bavaria, Germany and Austria
- Termini: Rosenheim; Border of Germany–Austria
- Stations: 9

Service
- Type: Heavy rail, Passenger/Freight rail Intercity rail, Regional rail
- Route number: 950
- Operator(s): DB Bahn, Bayerische Regiobahn

History
- Opened: 5 August 1858

Technical
- Line length: 31.9 km (19.8 mi)
- Number of tracks: Double track
- Track gauge: 1,435 mm (4 ft 8 1/2 in) standard gauge
- Electrification: 15 kV/16.7 Hz AC Overhead line
- Operating speed: 140 km/h (87 mph)

The Rosenheim–Kufstein railway (German: Bahnstrecke Rosenheim–Kufstein) is a 32 kilometre-long double-track main line of the German railways. It connects the Munich–Rosenheim and the Rosenheim–Salzburg lines at Rosenheim with the line to Innsbruck, thus connecting Germany, Salzburg and eastern Austria with Innsbruck and the Brenner line to Italy and the Arlberg line to far western Austria. The line is part of the Line 1 of Trans-European Transport Networks (TEN-T). It is electrified at 15 kV, 16.7 Hz.

== History ==
A treaty between Austria and Bavaria, signed on 21 June 1851, regulated the access of each state to the other in relation to the building of railways. As there was no direct rail link between Vienna and the Tyrol at that time, Bavaria agreed in Article 1 that it would build railways from Munich to the border at Salzburg and from Rosenheim to the border at Kufstein. Austria committed itself under Article 2 to build a railway from Salzburg to Bruck an der Mur and from Kufstein to Innsbruck. The line was opened on 5 August 1858 as part of the Bavarian Maximilian’s Railway.

== Route ==
The line runs from Rosenheim in a southerly direction. After leaving Rosenheim station, it joins the southern end of the Rosenheim loop (or Rosenheim curve). The curve was opened on the 8 February 1982 and connects the line with the line from Salzburg, bypassing the station. The line also connects in Rosenheim station with the line from Mühldorf and the Mangfall Valley line from Holzkirchen.

To the south, the line passes through the Inn valley. A standard gauge line once ran from Raubling station to a peat works at Nicklheim. The narrow gauge Wendelstein Railway ran from Brannenburg station until 1961 when it was cut back to Waching in order to avoid several level crossings. Another narrow gauge line, the Wachtl Railway, still connects the cement plant near Kiefersfelden station with limestone quarries at Wachtl, just inside Austria in the municipality of Thiersee. Since 1991 a tourist service, called the Wachtl Express, has operated on the line from time to time. Between Kiefersfelden and Kufstein, the line crosses the border into Austria; the border station serves Kufstein. After Kufstein, the line becomes the Lower Inn Valley railway and leads on to Innsbruck.

== Operations ==
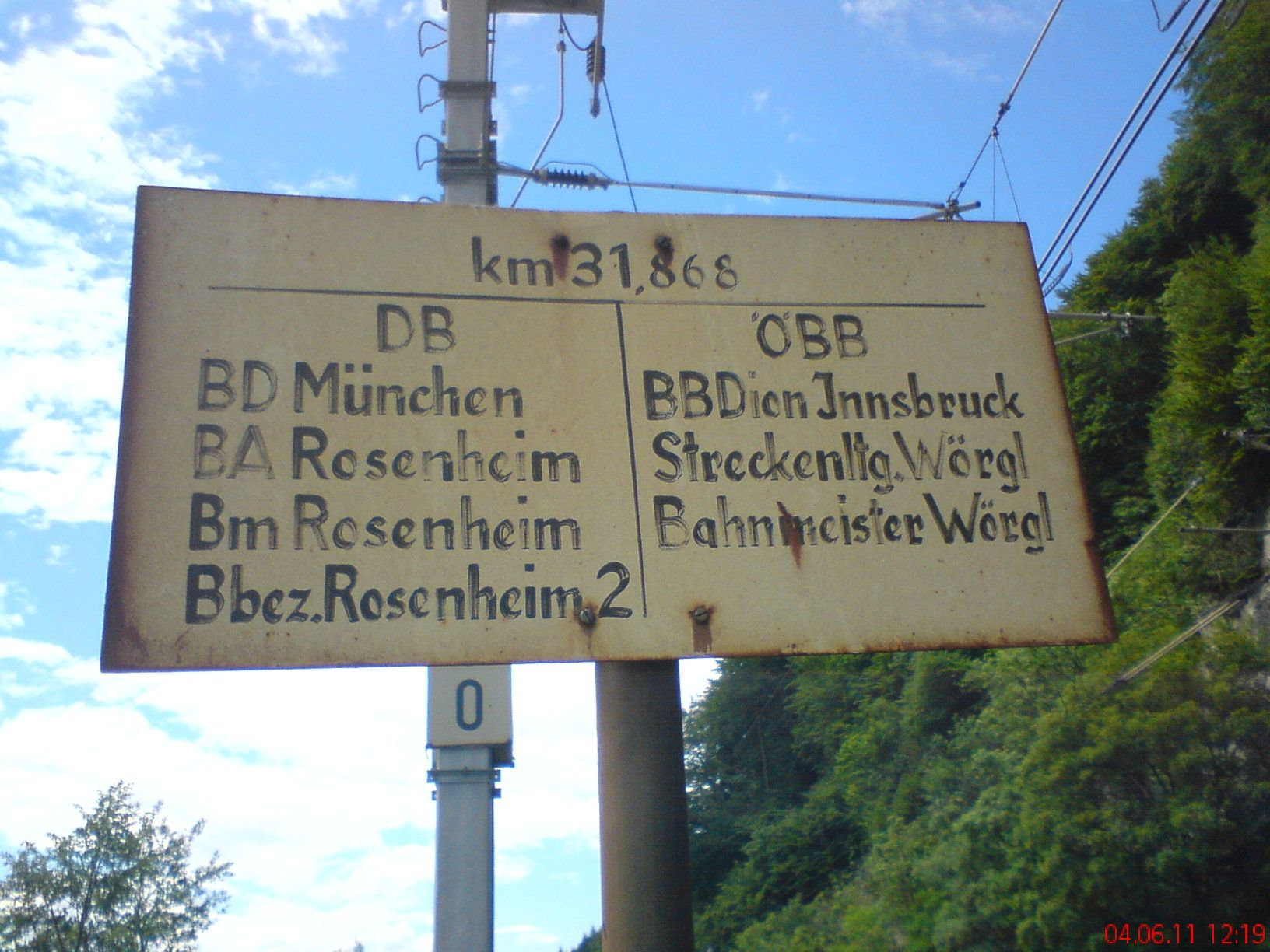
Signpost at the Austrian border

The route is part of the northern access to the Brenner railway to Italy and is thus part of the Berlin–Palermo railway axis. Non-stop travel time between Rosenheim and the border at Kufstein is 15 minutes, but due to temporary speed restrictions in most cases trains take longer. There is an hourly regional train service to Innsbruck, which requires a change in Kufstein. Every two hours, a EuroCity (EC) train operates on the route through Innsbruck and the Brenner Pass to Italy. Every two hours, Austrian Federal Railways runs Vienna–Salzburg–Innsbruck–Vorarlberg express trains over the line from South Rosenheim to Kufstein, but they do not stop. Although there are additional passenger services, there is still no regular-interval hourly service between Salzburg and Innsbruck. As of 2009, there were 32 scheduled services passenger services and approximately 20 freight trains each day on the line.

== Development ==
The construction of additional tracks to create a four-track line on the Rosenheim–Kufstein section is considered from time to time to cope with the expected increase in traffic after the opening of the Brenner Base Tunnel. Further expansion plans would provide a bypass of Rosenheim, with a branch off the line from Munich at Großkarolinenfeld and connecting with the Rosenheim–Kufstein line at Brannenburg.

Currently, only small projects are underway. These include the elimination of level crossings (most recently at Flintsbach and Brannenburg) and the installation of noise barriers, particularly in towns in the Inn Valley.
