= Lower Inn Valley Railway =

Railway line in Austria

Coordinates: 47.2633°N 11.4010°E

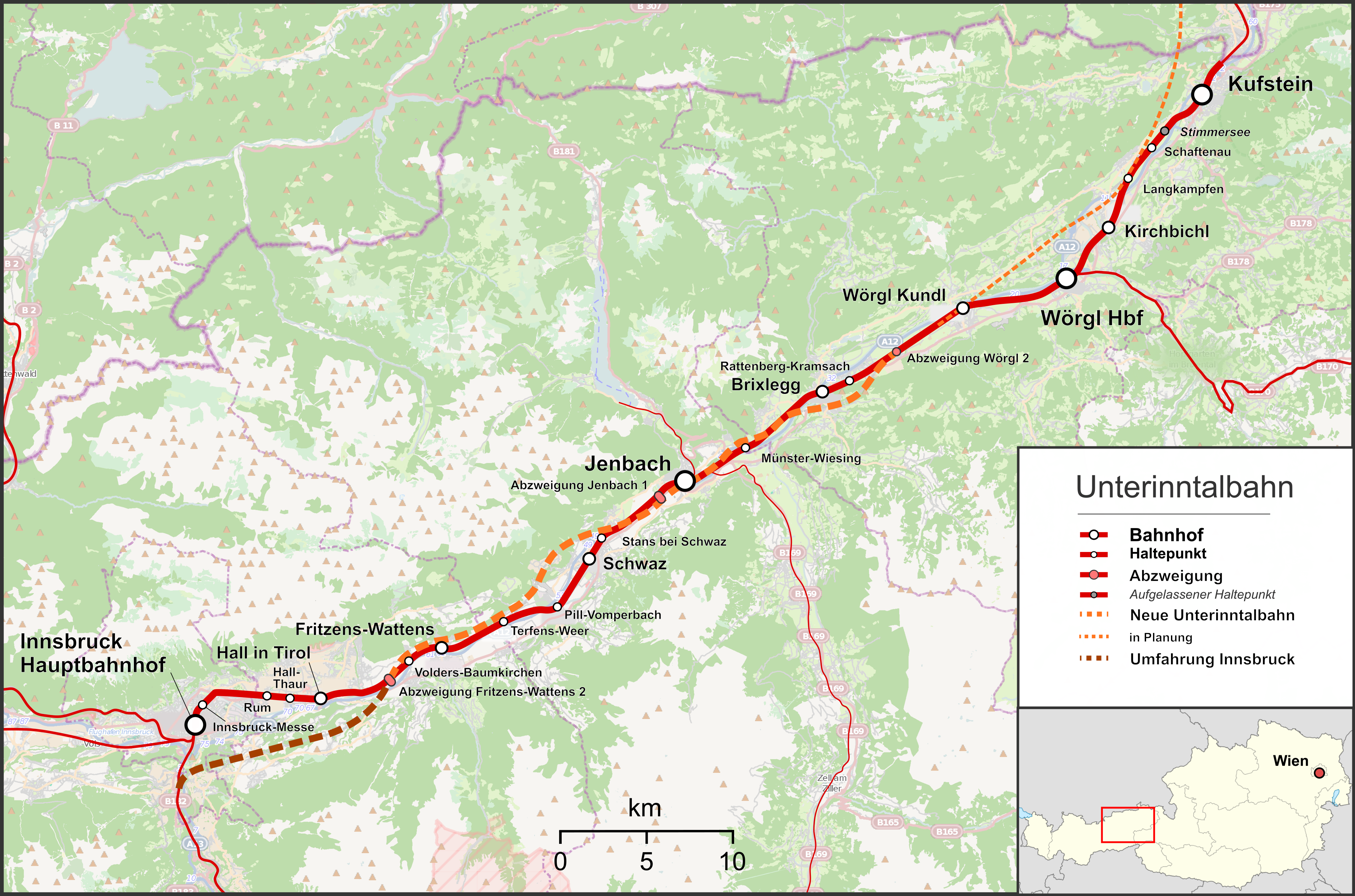

Overview
- Other name: Bahnstrecke Kufstein–Innsbruck
- Native name: Unterinntalbahn
- Status: Operational
- Owner: Austrian Federal Railways
- Line number: 302 01 Border near Kufstein–Wörgl Hbf; 101 04 Wörgl Hbf–Innsbruck; 101 15 Beschleunigungsgleis Wörgl Hbf – Wörgl Kundl
- Locale: Tyrol
- Termini: Border of Germany–Austria; Innsbruck
- Stations: 21

Service
- Type: Heavy rail, Passenger/Freight rail Intercity rail, Regional rail, Commuter rail
- Route number: 300 Salzburg Hbf - Brennero/Brenner; 301 Jenbach - Telfs-Pfaffenhofen / Steinach in Tirol
- Operator(s): Austrian Federal Railways

History
- Opened: 24 November 1858

Technical
- Line length: 75.130 km (46.684 mi)
- Number of tracks: Double track
- Track gauge: 1,435 mm (4 ft 8 1/2 in) standard gauge
- Electrification: 15 kV/16.7 Hz AC Overhead line
- Operating speed: 160 km/h (99 mph)

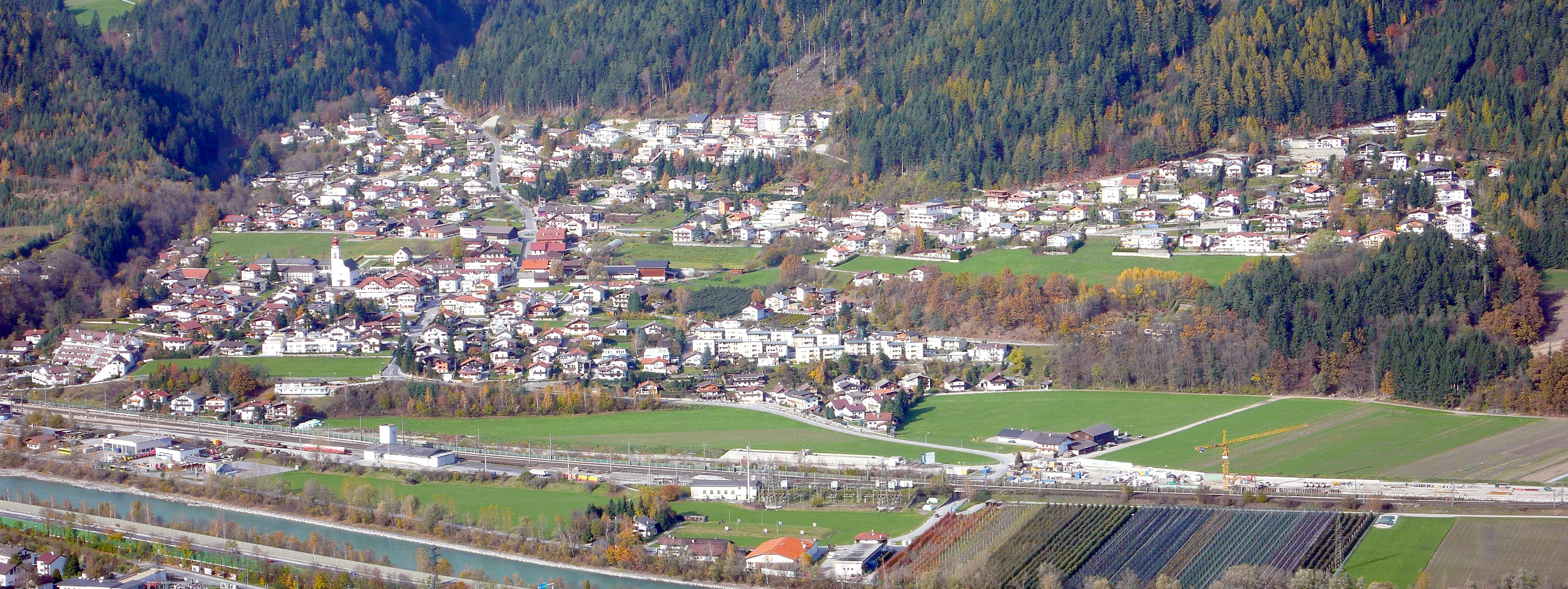
Lower Inn Valley railway to the north of the Inn at Fritzens. Work on the New Lower Inn Valley Railway is under way next to the line.

The Lower Inn Valley Railway (German: Unterinntalbahn) is a two-track, electrified railway line that is one of the major lines of the Austrian railways. It was originally opened as the k.k. Nordtiroler Staatsbahn (Imperial and Royal North Tyrolean State Railway). It begins at the German border near the Austrian city of Kufstein as a continuation of the Rosenheim–Kufstein line and runs in a generally south-westerly direction through Tyrol along the Inn valley to Innsbruck. The line is part of the Line 1 of Trans-European Transport Networks (TEN-T). The line is owned and operated by Austrian Federal Railways (ÖBB).

== History ==
Emperor Franz Joseph I of Austria had ordered its construction in 1853. The line was the first railway in western Austria, opened on 24 November 1858.

== New line ==
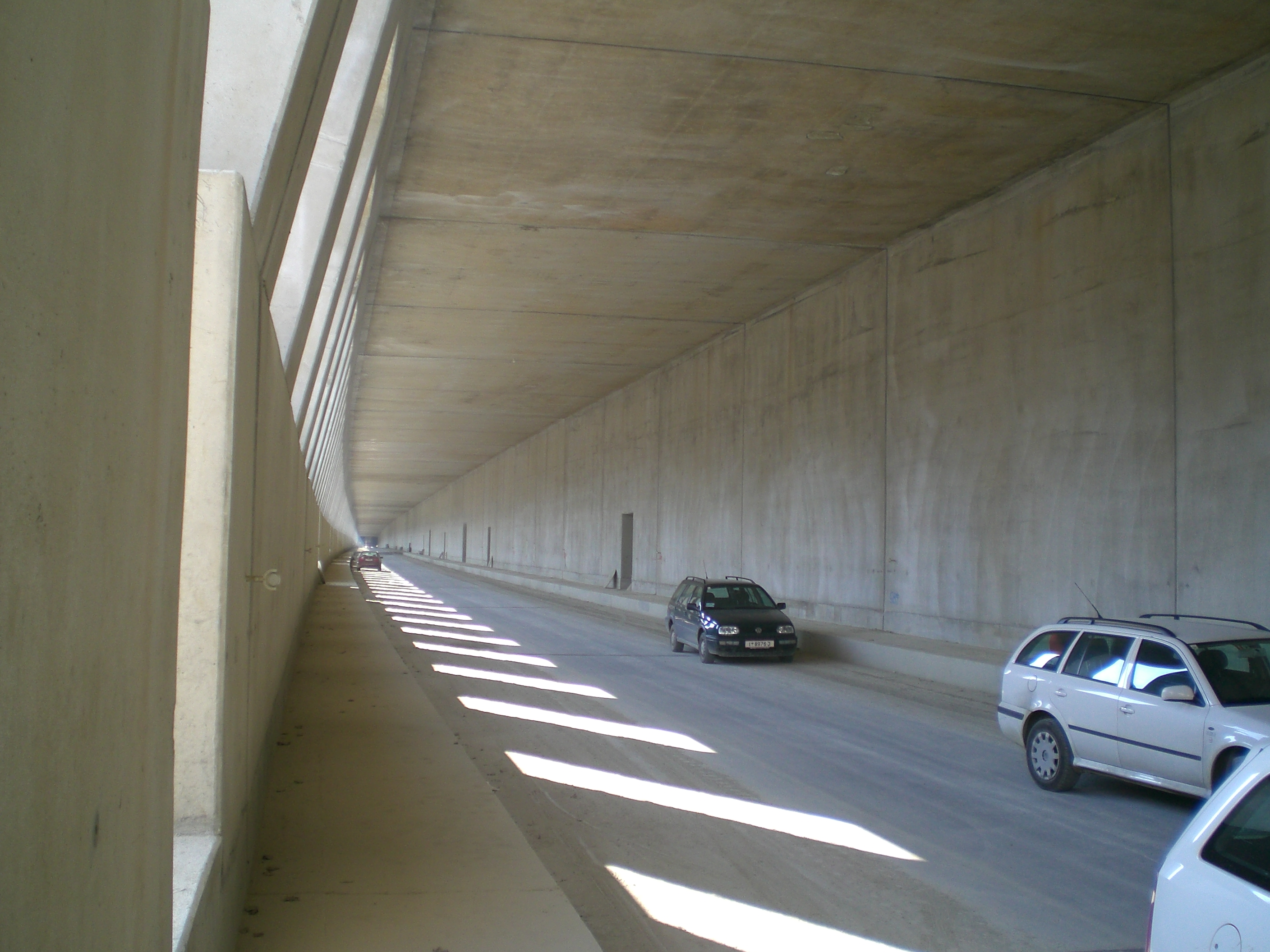
Concrete shell for the New Lower Inn Valley railway (2007)

In order to increase the capacity of the track and in preparation for the construction of the Brenner Base Tunnel a new high-capacity line has been built between Kundl 1 junction and Fritzen-Wattens 1 junction (at Baumkirchen). It was opened on 9 December 2012 for scheduled traffic. The great majority of this line has been built in tunnel in order not to increase noise pollution in the Inn valley. The new route is designed for mixed traffic up to 250 km/h (160 mph) and is fitted with ETCS Level 2 signalling system. An extension of the new line from Kundl/Radfeld to Brannenburg is in the planning phase.
