= Fritzens =

- Municipality
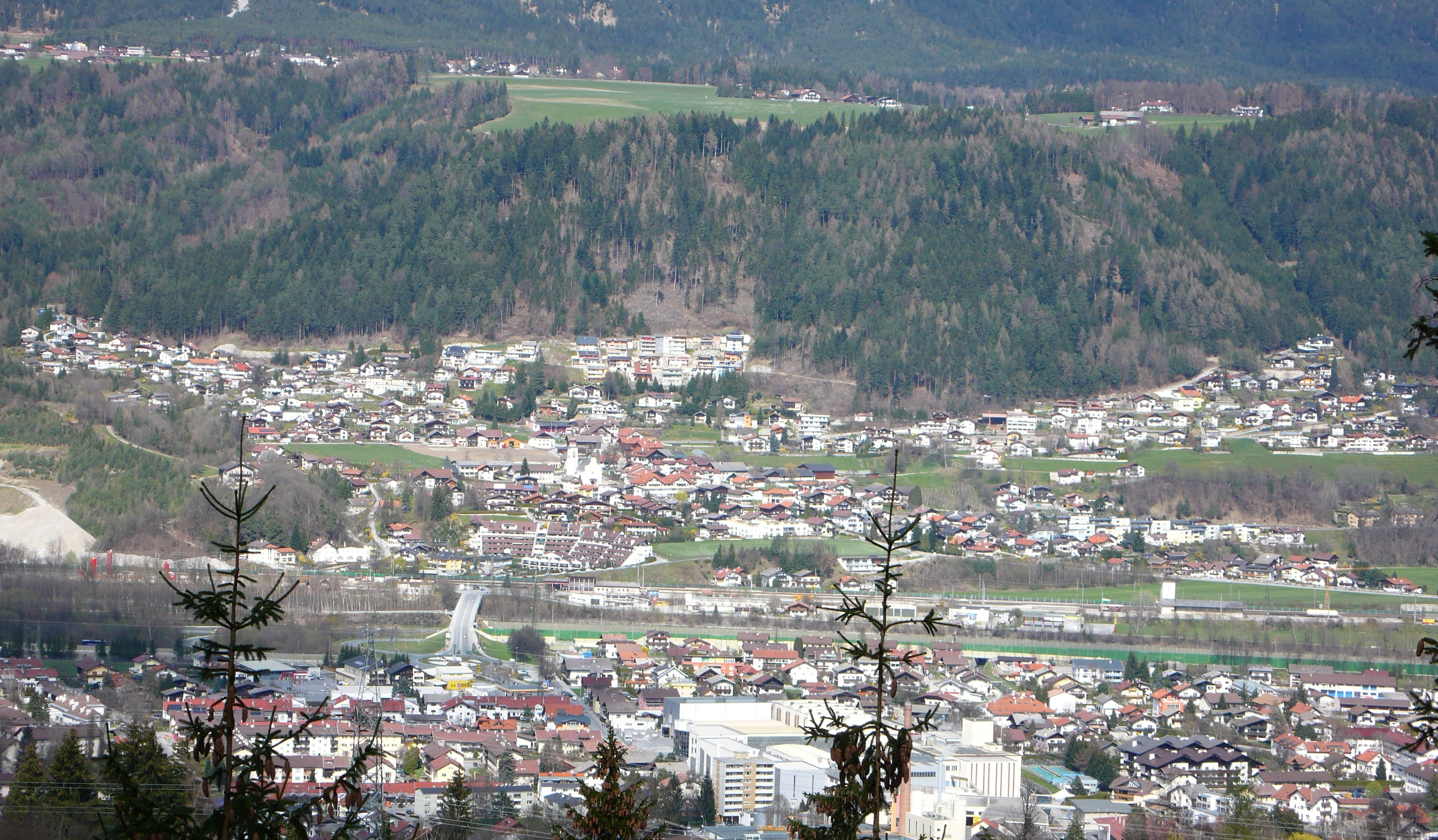

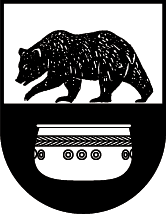
- Coat of arms

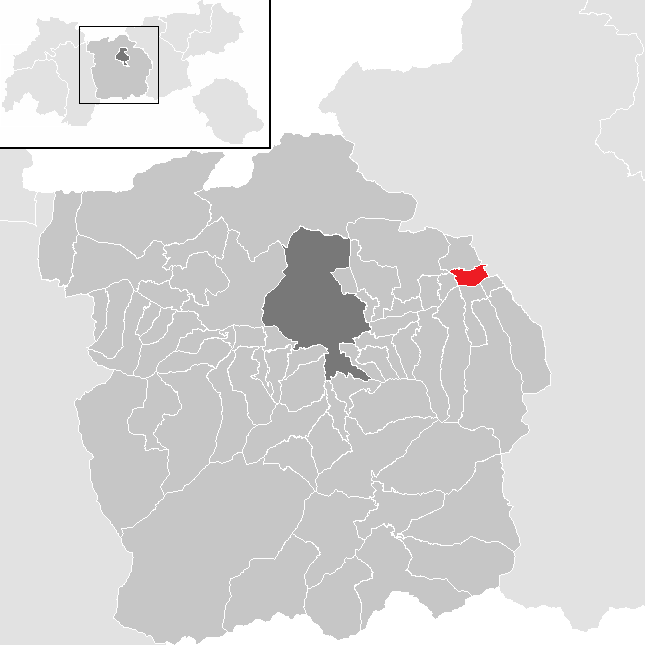
- Location in the district

- Location within Austria
- Coordinates: 47°18′19″N 11°35′25″E
- Country: Austria
- State: Tyrol
- District: Innsbruck Land

Government
  - Mayor: Josef Gahr (Fritzner Gemeindeliste)

Area
  - Total: 6.14 km^{2} (2.37 sq mi)
- Elevation: 591 m (1,939 ft)

Population (2021)
  - Total: 2,148
  - Density: 350/km^{2} (906/sq mi)
- Time zone: UTC+1 (CET)
  - Summer (DST): UTC+2 (CEST)
- Postal code: 6122
- Area code: 05224
- Vehicle registration: IL
- Website: www.fritzens.tirol.gv.at

Fritzens is a municipality in the district Innsbruck country in Tyrol (Austria). It lies 16 km east of Innsbruck on the north side of the Inn River. The Iron Age Fritzens-Sanzeno culture is named for archaeological finds from the village.

== Population ==
Historical population
Year	Pop.	±%
1869	234	—
1880	243	+3.8%
1890	259	+6.6%
1900	281	+8.5%
1910	365	+29.9%
1923	410	+12.3%
1934	602	+46.8%
1939	621	+3.2%
1951	812	+30.8%
1961	1,381	+70.1%
1971	1,714	+24.1%
1981	1,688	−1.5%
1991	1,848	+9.5%
2001	2,022	+9.4%
2011	2,063	+2.0%
2015	2,091	+1.4%
