= Baumkirchen =

- Municipality
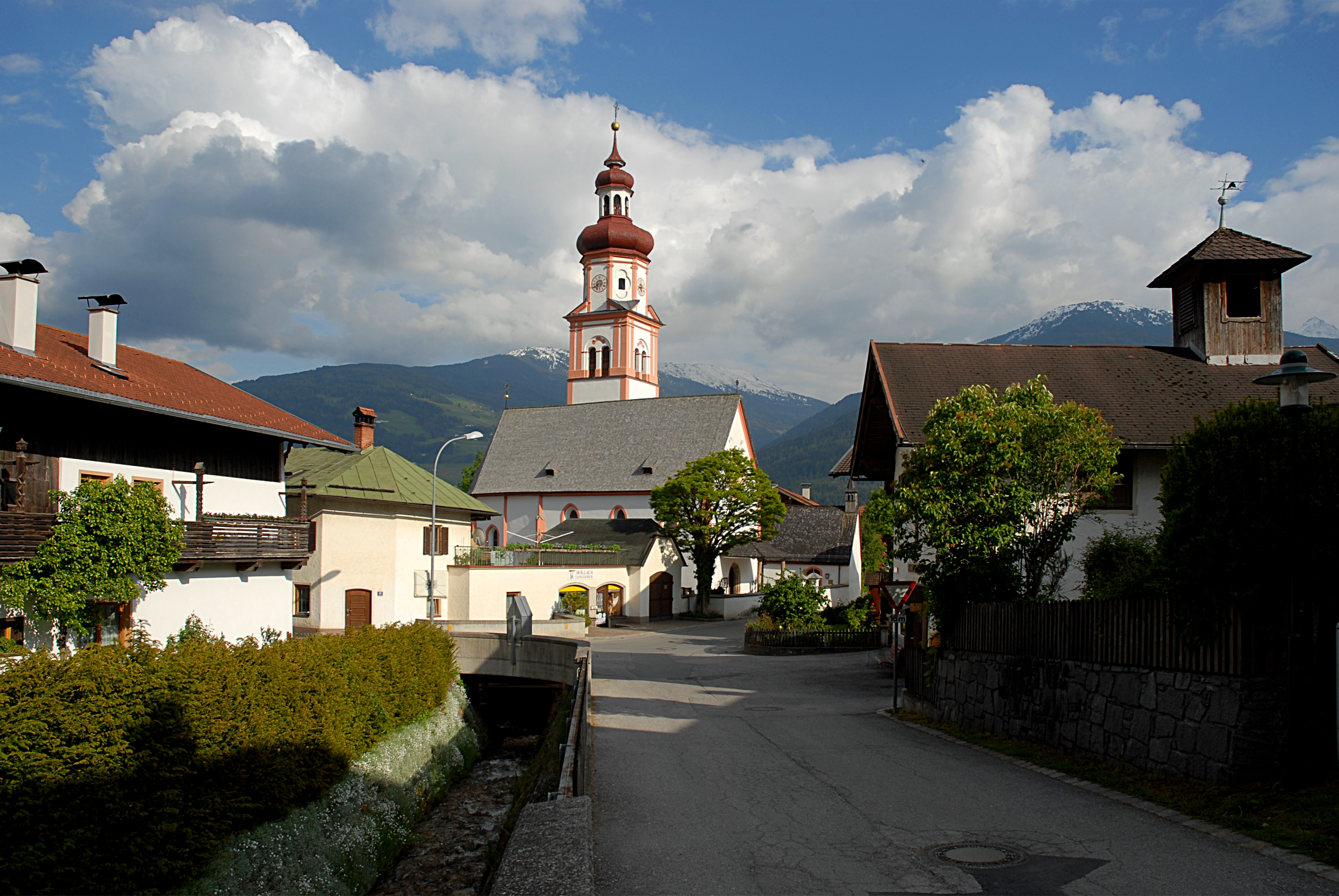

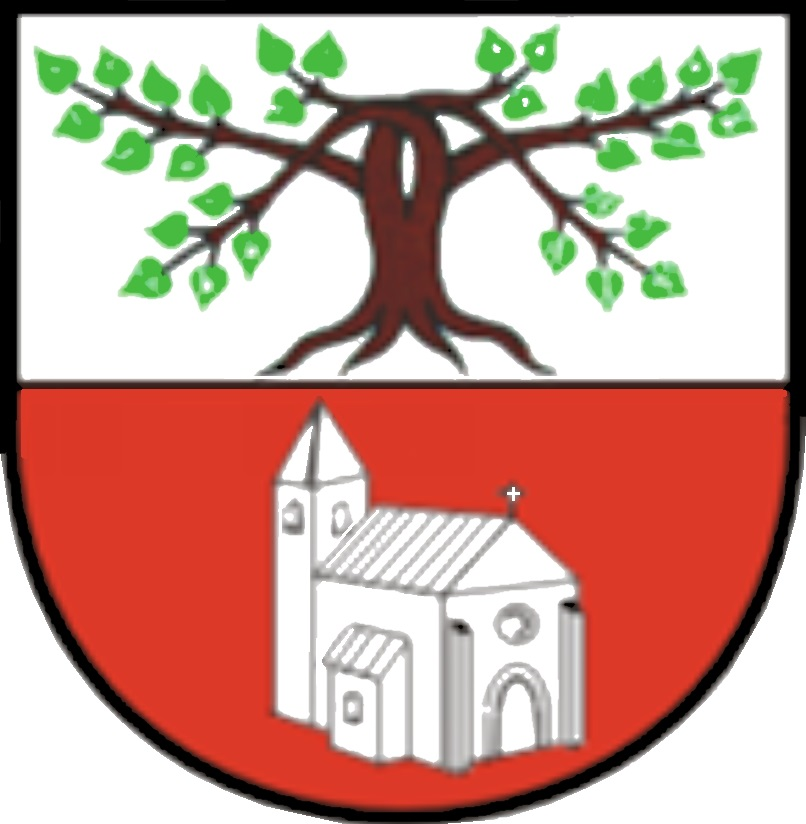
- Coat of arms

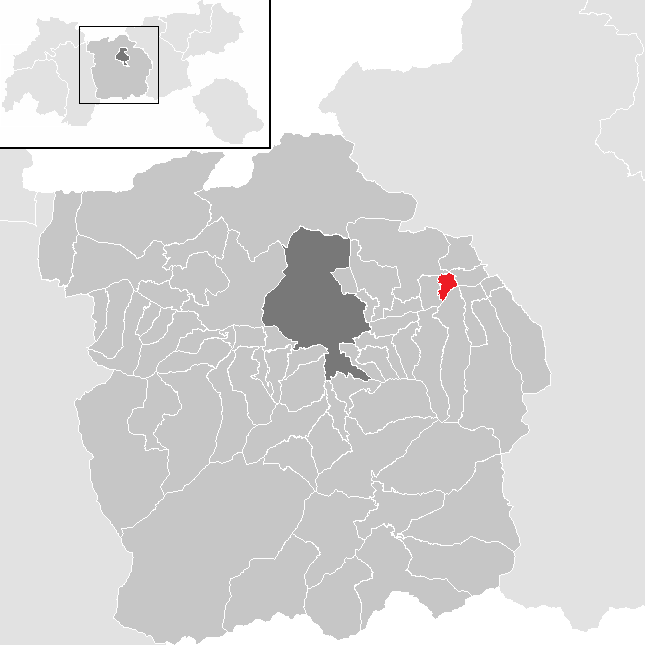
- Location in the district

- Location within Austria
- Coordinates: 47°17′59″N 11°33′00″E
- Country: Austria
- State: Tyrol
- District: Innsbruck Land

Government
  - Mayor: Josef Schindl (ÖVP)

Area
  - Total: 4.03 km^{2} (1.56 sq mi)
- Elevation: 593 m (1,946 ft)

Population (2021)
  - Total: 1,297
  - Density: 322/km^{2} (834/sq mi)
- Time zone: UTC+1 (CET)
  - Summer (DST): UTC+2 (CEST)
- Postal code: 6121
- Area code: 05224
- Vehicle registration: IL
- Website: www.baumkirchen.tirol.gv.at

Baumkirchen is a community in the district of Innsbruck Land. It lies in the Inn Valley north of the Inn River on a batter of the Gnadenwald terrace. The village can be reached via the Inn Valley Motorway.

== Population ==
Historical population
Year	Pop.	±%
1869	232	—
1880	260	+12.1%
1890	246	−5.4%
1900	256	+4.1%
1910	269	+5.1%
1923	292	+8.6%
1934	431	+47.6%
1939	416	−3.5%
1951	512	+23.1%
1961	543	+6.1%
1971	713	+31.3%
1981	870	+22.0%
1991	935	+7.5%
2001	1,085	+16.0%
2011	1,144	+5.4%
2015	1,217	+6.4%
