= Brannenburg =

- Municipality
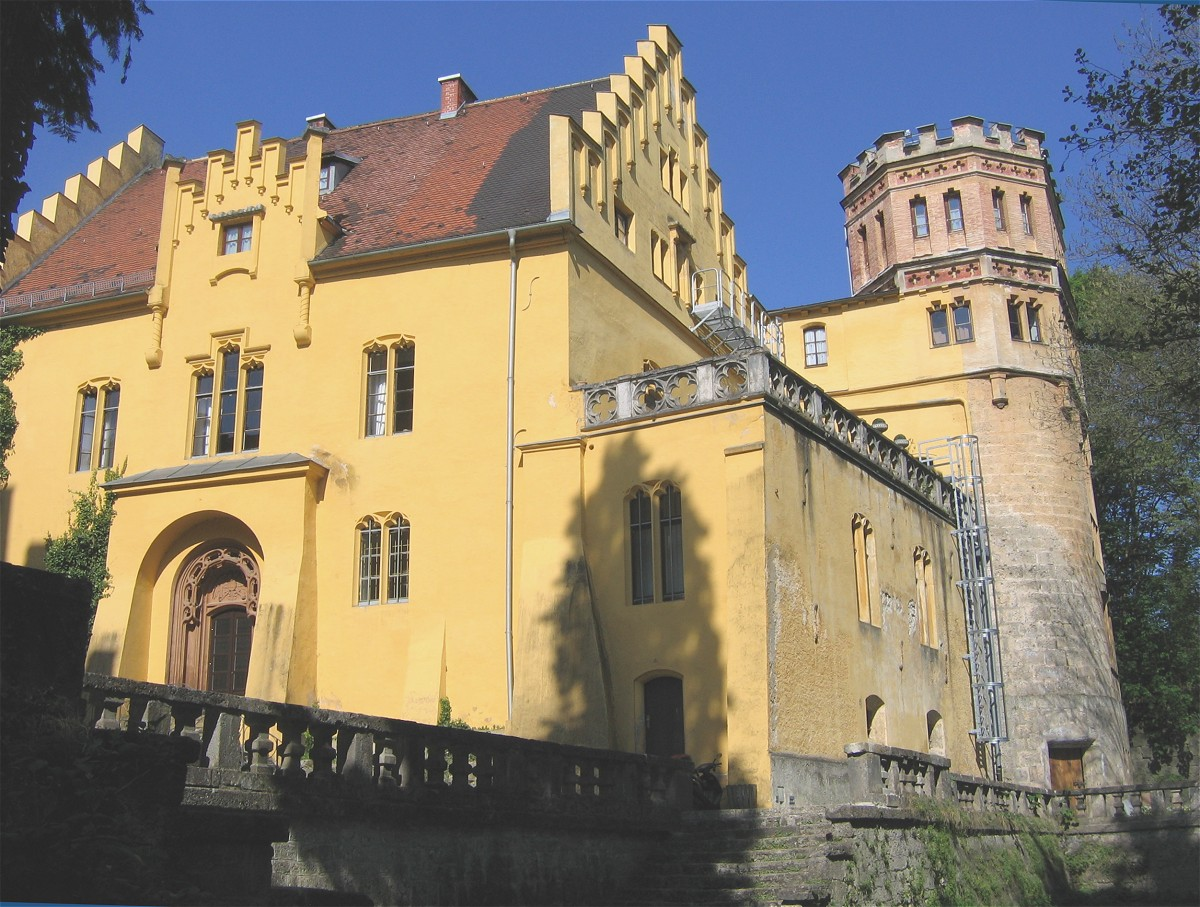
- Brannenburg Castle in 2007

- Coat of arms

- Location of Brannenburg within Rosenheim district
- Interactive map of Brannenburg
- Location within Germany Location within Bavaria
- Coordinates: 47°44′N 12°6′E
- Country: Germany
- State: Bavaria
- Admin. region: Oberbayern
- District: Rosenheim
- Subdivisions: 3 Ortsteile

Government
  - Mayor (2020–26): Matthias Jokisch (CSU)

Area
  - Total: 33.67 km^{2} (13.00 sq mi)
- Elevation: 509 m (1,670 ft)

Population (2025-12-31)
  - Total: 6,584
  - Density: 195.5/km^{2} (506.5/sq mi)
- Time zone: UTC+01:00 (CET)
  - Summer (DST): UTC+02:00 (CEST)
- Postal codes: 83098
- Dialling codes: 08034
- Vehicle registration: RO
- Website: www.gemeinde-brannenburg.de

Brannenburg (German pronunciation: [ˈbʁanənbʊʁk]) is a municipality in the district of Rosenheim in Bavaria in Germany. There is a railway station located in Brannenburg.
