= Tyrol–South Tyrol–Trentino Euroregion =

Euroregion formed by three different regional authorities in Austria and Italy

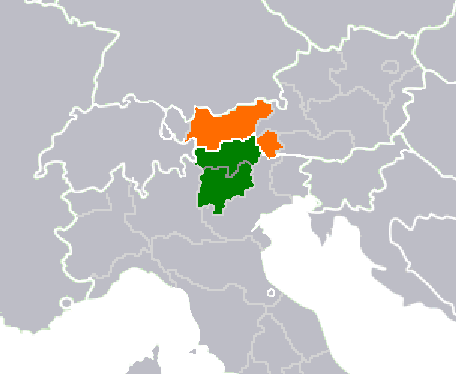
- Location of Tyrol–South Tyrol–Trentino in Central Europe
- Office(s): Bolzano and Brussels
- Official languages: German, Italian, Ladin, Cimbrian, Mocheno
- Type: Euroregion
- Membership: Tyrol; South Tyrol; Trentino

Leaders
  - President: Arno Kompatscher (SVP)
- Establishment: 1998

Area
  - Total: 26,254 km^{2} (10,137 sq mi)

Population
  - 2011 estimate: 1,755,186

The Tyrol–South Tyrol–Trentino Euroregion (German: Europaregion Tirol-Südtirol-Trentino; Italian: Euregio Tirolo-Alto Adige-Trentino) is a Euroregion formed by three different regional authorities in Austria and Italy: the Austrian state of Tyrol (i.e. North and East Tyrol) and the Italian autonomous provinces of South Tyrol and Trentino.

== Overview ==
The boundaries of the association correspond to the former Princely County of Tyrol, a crown land of the Habsburg monarchy (including the former Prince-bishoprics of Trent and Brixen) which for centuries shaped life in the Alpine region. Excluded from the association due to a change of the province by the fascists, are Cortina, Livinallongo, Colle Santa Lucia, Pedemonte, Valvestino and Magasa, but they have voted in 2007/2008 to revert to the provinces of South Tyrol/Trentino, which has not yet been approved by the Italian legislature in Rome. Divided after World War I, the region retained much of its cultural integrity by its traditionally strong attachment to the land and a profound desire for self-government on both sides of the border. The long-standing cultural, social and economic ties, as much as the recognition of convergent interests based on its traditional role as transit country and its largely identical environmental conditions in the Eastern Alps, led to the creation of the Euroregion by the three provinces in 1998.

Linguistically, the population in Austrian Tyrol is German-speaking, while the overwhelming majority of the inhabitants of Trentino is Italian-speaking. In South Tyrol, approximately two-thirds speak German as their mother tongue and one-quarter speak Italian. Overall, 62% of the Euroregion are German speakers and 37% Italian speakers. About 1% of the total population of the Euroregion speak Ladin as mother tongue, this group being mainly indigenous to South Tyrol, but also to the Trentino and Belluno.

== Member regions ==

The Euroregion in numbers as of 31 December 2006:

Region	Surface in km²	Population (31.12.2011)	Population density per km^{2}
Tyrol	12,648	710,042	56.1
South Tyrol	7,400	511,750	69.2
Trentino	6,207	533,394	85.9
Overall	26,255	1,755,186	66.8

== Co-operation ==
Cross-border cooperation between the three neighbours covers today many fields, including tourism, traffic, infrastructure, social services and environmental issues in the sensitive central Alps area. In 2001, the joint Alpendeklaration ('Alpine declaration'), a charter for sustainable development, called for a reconciliation of economic pressures with the wish of the local population to preserve its living environment. A common liaison office was set up in Brussels to foster relations with the EU.

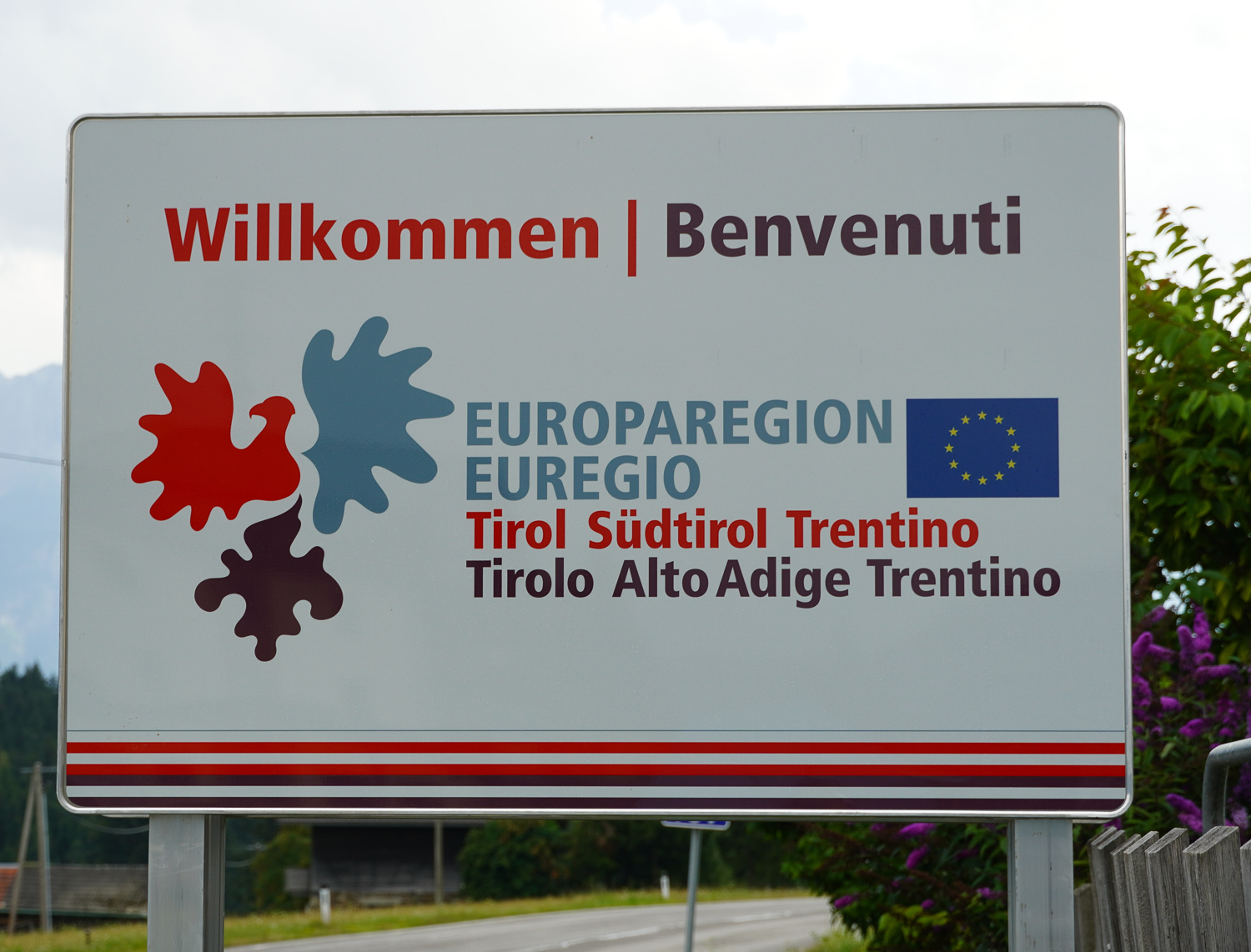
Welcome sign at the border between Carinthia and Tyrol, Austria

Following a historic meeting between the parliaments of Austrian Tyrol and South Tyrol in 1971, the first in 57 years, the joint meetings were extended 20 years later to include the Trentino. In the 1990s, the Austrian federal-state of Vorarlberg, which enjoyed close relations with the region in the past, was granted observer status in the Three Provinces' Parliament (Dreier Landtag). Meetings of the assembly were held at various places of historical importance, such as Innsbruck and the former capital of Tyrol, Merano.

== See also ==
- Tyrol
- History of Tyrol
- History of South Tyrol
- List of euroregions
