= Tyrol =

Region across the Alps

Tyrol Tirol (German) Tirol (Ladin) Tirolo (Italian) Tirol (Lombard) Tiroło (Venetian)
- Flag
- Motto: Land im Gebirge (German); Terra inter montes (Ladin); Terra fra i monti (Italian) "Country in the mountains"
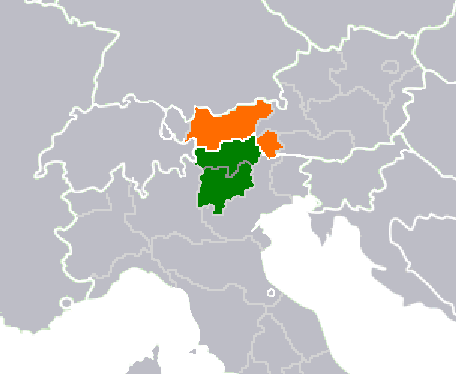
- Tyrol's southern part is located in Northern Italy and its northern part in Austria

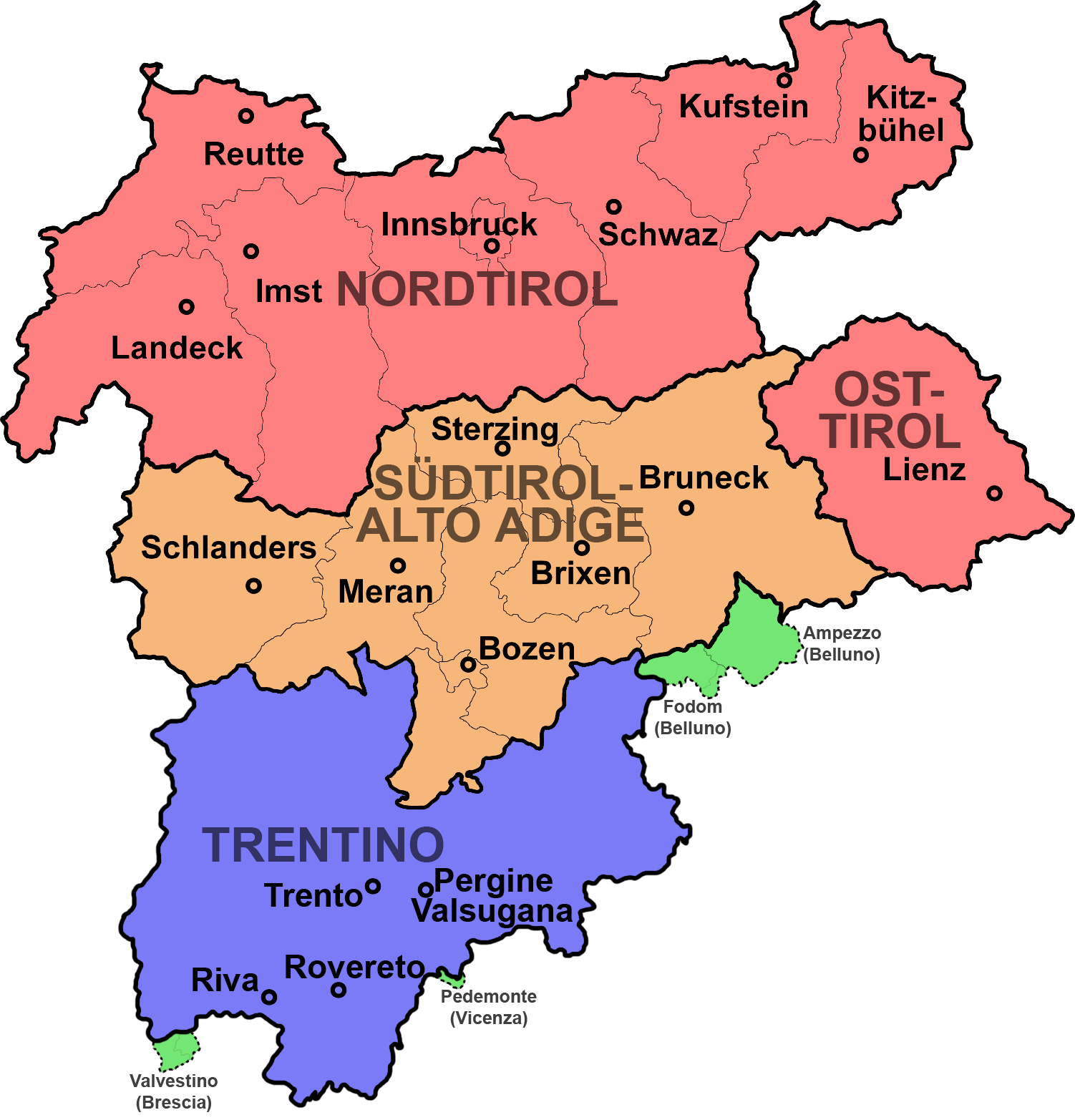
- The region consists of present-day Tyrol–South Tyrol–Trentino Euroregion (pink, orange and blue), plus Cortina d'Ampezzo, Fodóm (Buchenstein), Col (Verseil), Valvestino, Magasa and Pedemonte (all green)
- Capital: Tirol (1027–1418); Merano (1418–1848); Innsbruck (1848–1918); Innsbruck (1918–today)
- Official languages: German, Italian, Ladin, Cimbrian and Mòcheno
- Demonym: Tyrolean

Area
  - Total: 26,674 km^{2} (10,299 sq mi)

Population
  - 2017 estimate: 1,813,400
  - Density: 68/km^{2} (176.1/sq mi)
- Currency: Euro (€) (EUR)

Tyrol (/tɪˈroʊl, taɪˈroʊl, ˈtaɪroʊl/ tih-ROHL, ty-ROHL, TY-rohl; historically the Tyrole; German: Tirol [tiˈroːl]; Italian: Tirolo) is a historical region in the Alps of Northern Italy and western Austria. The area was historically the core of the County of Tyrol, part of the Holy Roman Empire, Austrian Empire and Austria-Hungary, from its formation in the 12th century until 1919.

In 1919, following World War I and the dissolution of Austria-Hungary, it was divided into two modern administrative parts through the Treaty of Saint-Germain-en-Laye:

- State of Tyrol: Formed through the merger of North and East Tyrol, as part of Austria.
- Region of Trentino-Alto Adige: At that time still with Souramont (Cortina d'Ampezzo, Livinallongo del Col di Lana and Colle Santa Lucia) and the municipalities Valvestino, Magasa, and Pedemonte. This was seized in 1918 by the Kingdom of Italy, and since 1946 has been part of the Italian Republic.

With the founding of the European region Tyrol-South Tyrol-Trentino, the area has had its own legal entity since 2011. It is known as a European Grouping for Territorial Cooperation.

== Etymology ==
According to Egon Kühebacher, the name Tyrol derives from a root word meaning terrain (i.e. area, ground or soil; compare Latin: terra and Old Irish: tír); first from the village of Tirol, and its castle; from which the County of Tyrol developed. Some sources suggest it derives from the Slavic language "ta rola" meaning "this land, farming terrain/farming ground." According to Karl Finsterwalder, the name Tyrol derives from Teriolis, a late-Roman fort and travellers' hostel in Zirl, Tyrol. There seems to be no scholarly consensus.

== Geography ==
=== Location ===
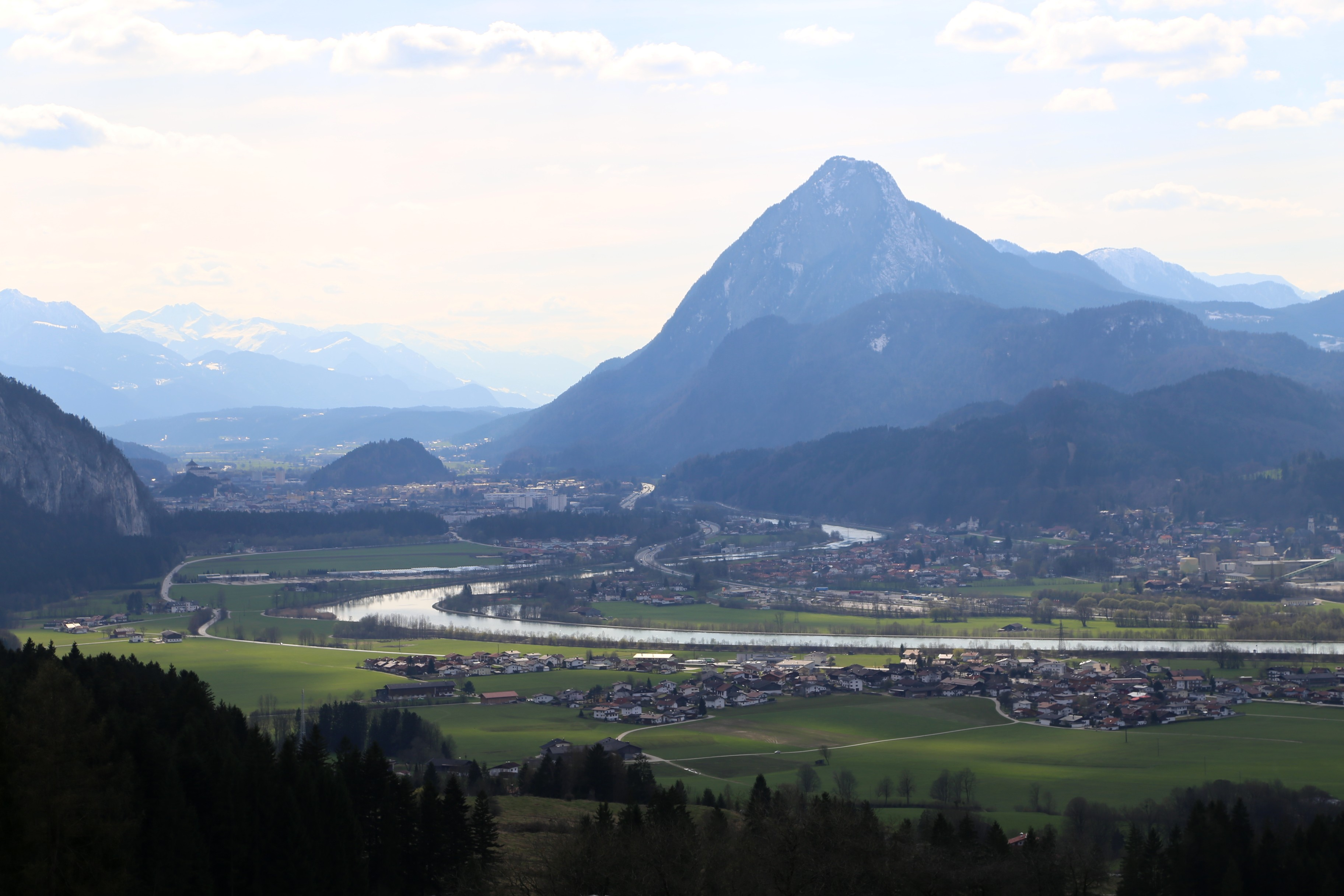
Inn Valley with a view of Kufstein and the prominent Pendling mountain

Tyrol has an area of 26,673 km^{2}. The region consists of the State of Tyrol, the Province of South Tyrol and the Province of Trento. In addition to the region belong the municipalities Cortina d'Ampezzo, Livinallongo del Col di Lana, Colle Santa Lucia and Pedemonte from the Region of Veneto and Valvestino and Magasa from the Region of Lombardy. The largest cities in Tyrol are Innsbruck, Trento and Bolzano.

The whole region of Tyrol is located in the Alps. Tyrol is bordered to the north by the state of Bavaria and to the east by the states of Carinthia and Salzburg. West of Tyrol lies the state of Vorarlberg and the canton of Grisons. On the southern side of Tyrol, the land is bordered by the regions of Veneto and Lombardy.

Important rivers in Tyrol are the Adige, Inn and Drau. The region is characterized by many valleys. Some of these valleys are still difficult to reach today. The most important valleys are the Inn Valley and Adige Valley. A large part of the population lives in these two valleys and also the five largest cities of Tyrol (Innsbruck, Bolzano, Trento, Merano, and Rovereto) lie in these valleys.

For centuries, the region has been known for transit trade. The most important trade route across the Alps, namely the Brenner Route, traverses the whole of Tyrol and is regarded as a connecting link between the Italian and German-speaking areas.

=== Mountains ===
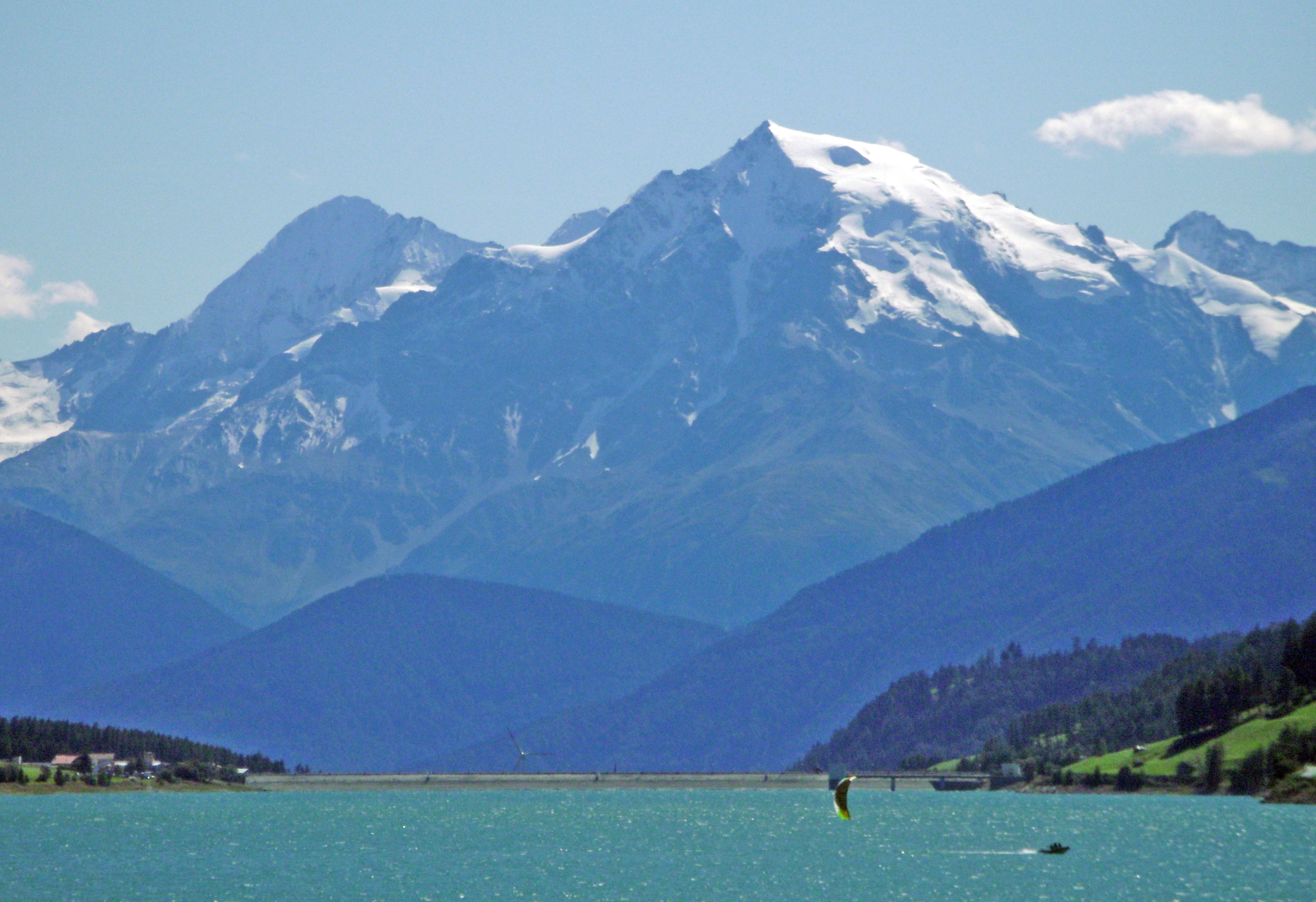
left summit: the Königspitze, right summit: the Ortler; seen from Lake Reschen

As the Tyrolean region is located in the Alps, the landscape is heavily influenced by the mountains. The highest mountains in Tyrol include:

- the Ortler – 3,905 m a.s.l.
- the Königspitze – 3,851 m a.s.l.
- the Großglockner – 3,798 m AA
- the Monte Cevedale – 3,769 m a.s.l.
- the Wildspitze – 3,768 m AA

Across Tyrol, on the border between North and South Tyrol, runs the main chain of the Alps. The main chain of the Alps geographically divides the Alps into a southern and northern half.

=== Biggest municipalities ===
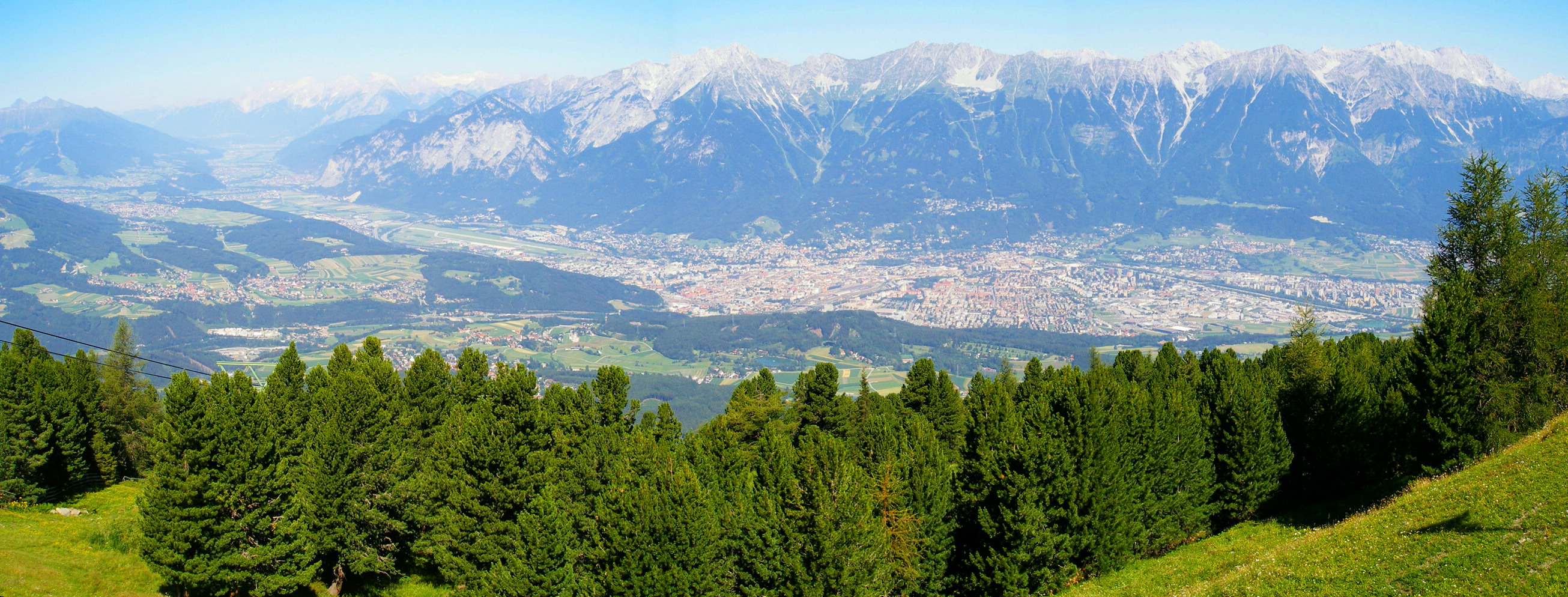
Innsbruck with the Nordkette

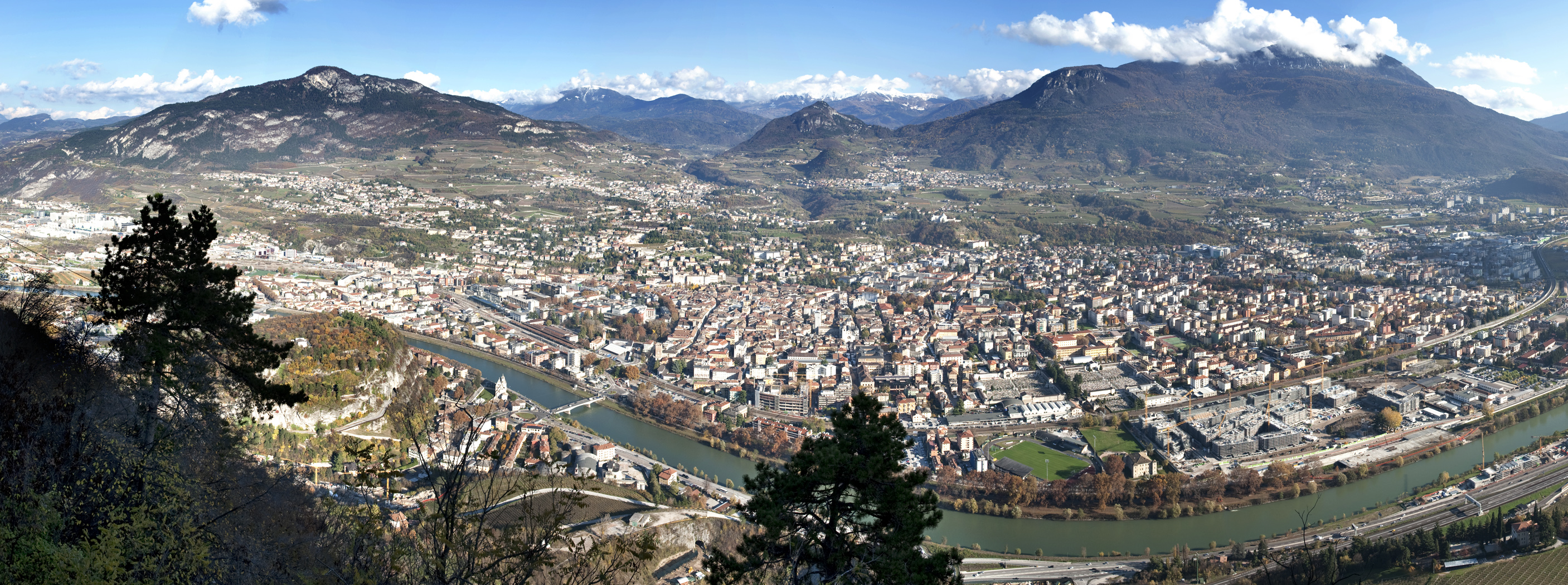
Trento

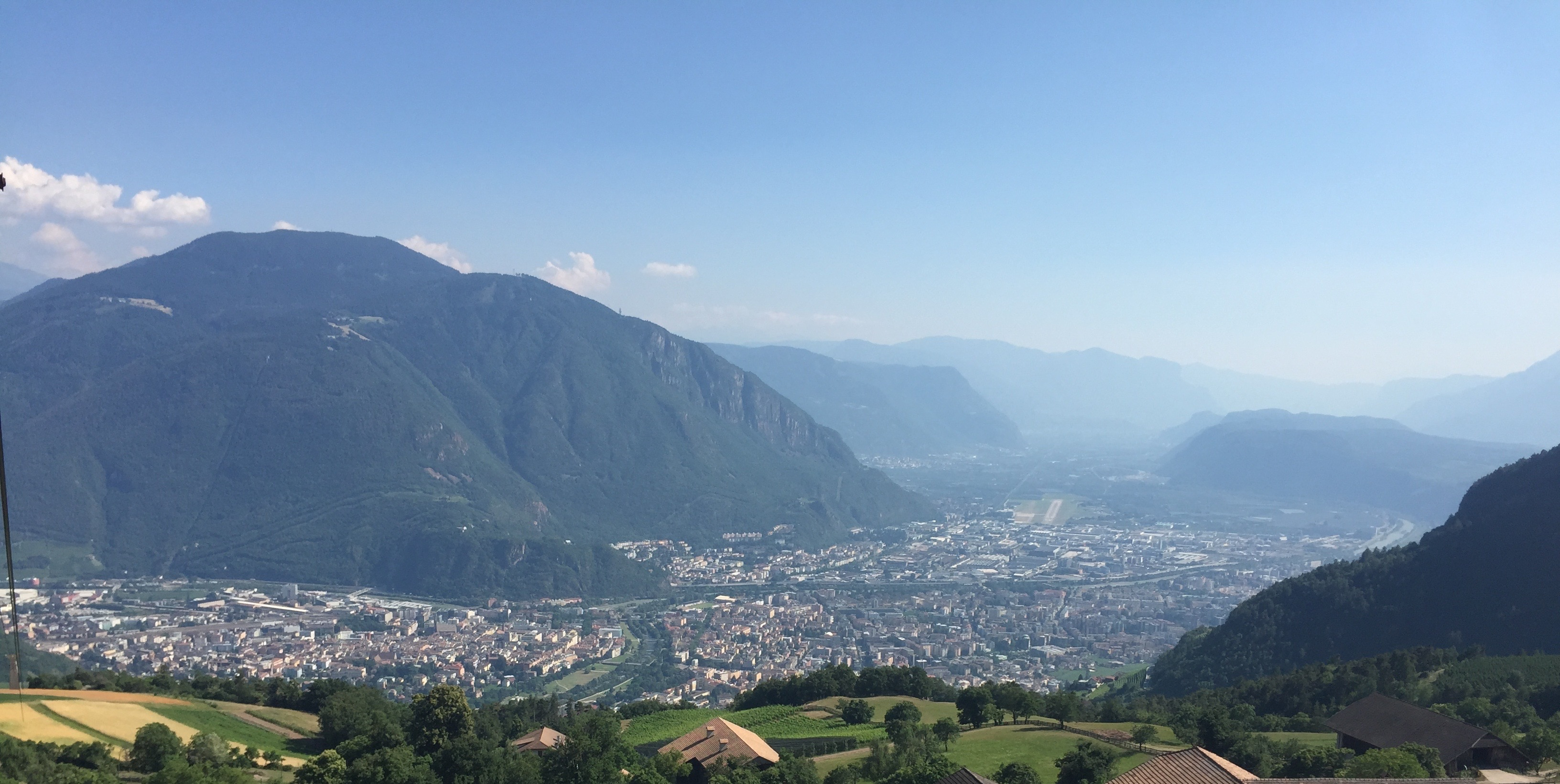
Bolzano

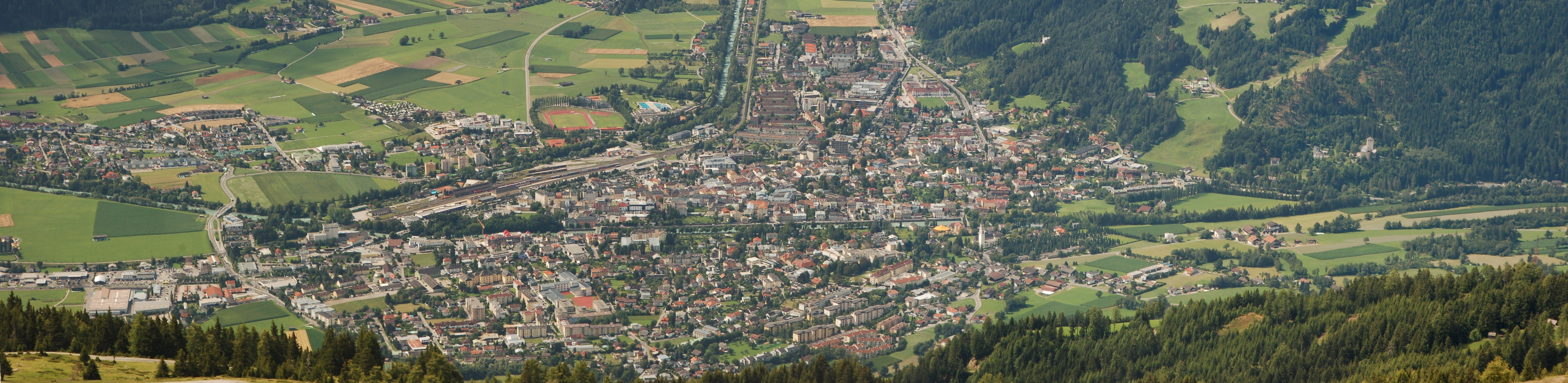
Lienz

Municipalities of Tyrol with over 10,000 inhabitants:

| Rank | Municipality | Inhabitants |
|---|---|---|
| 1 | Innsbruck | 132,236 |
| 2 | Trento | 117,417 |
| 3 | Bolzano/Bozen | 106,951 |
| 4 | Merano/Meran | 40,047 |
| 5 | Rovereto | 39,482 |
| 6 | Brixen/Bressanone | 21,688 |
| 7 | Pergine Valsugana | 21,363 |
| 8 | Kufstein | 18,973 |
| 9 | Laives | 17,780 |
| 10 | Arco | 17,588 |
| 11 | Riva del Garda | 17,190 |
| 12 | Bruneck/Brunico | 16,356 |
| 13 | Telfs | 15,582 |
| 14 | Eppan/Appiano | 14,900 |
| 15 | Hall in Tirol | 13,801 |
| 16 | Schwaz | 13,606 |
| 17 | Wörgl | 13,537 |
| 18 | Lana | 12,046 |
| 19 | Lienz | 11,945 |
| 20 | Imst | 10,371 |

Austria: 1 January 2017
Italy: 31 December 2016

== Society ==
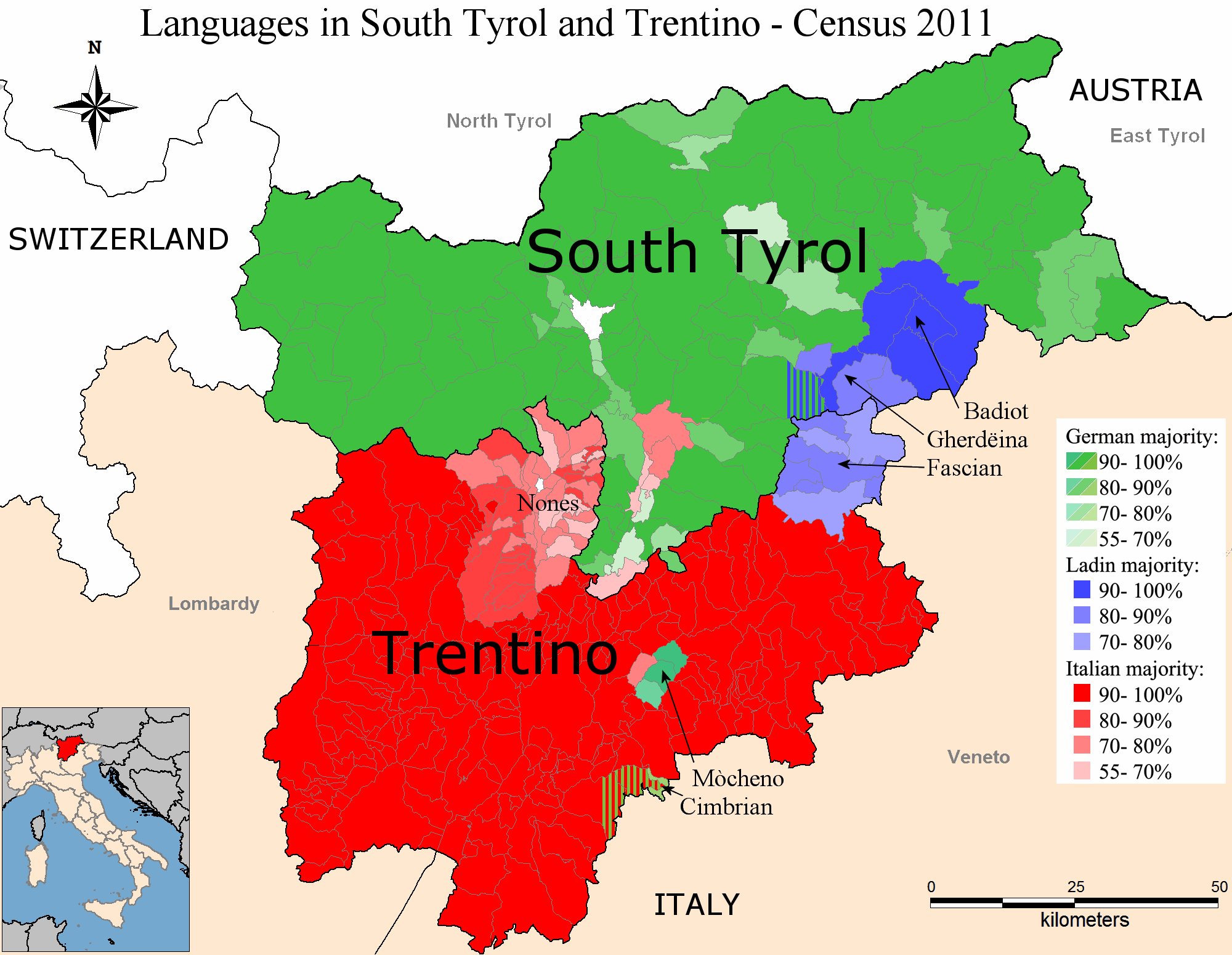
Language distribution in Trentino-Alto Adige/Südtirol

=== Language distribution ===
Tyrol can be subdivided into 5 different language groups. In addition to the majority languages such as German and Italian, languages such as Ladin, Cimbrian and Mócheno are also spoken. The last three languages are recognized as minority languages. These language groups are mostly located in the Trentino-Alto Adige region and are thus promoted and protected by the region. The Ladin language is also spoken outside the region in Souramont (Province of Belluno). Ladin is considered a Rhaeto-Romance language. The Cimbrian language is also used in various linguistic islands (Sette Comuni) outside the region of Trentino-Alto Adige/Südtirol. The Cimbrian and the Mòcheno languages are considered as upper-Bavarian dialects. In Trentino two Romance languages are spoken: Lombard in western valleys, and Venetian in eastern ones; in central Trentino a transitional dialect between the Lombard language and the Venetian language is spoken.

==== Dialects ====
In the Austrian state of Tyrol, the German language is used by a large majority. As in many other regions in German-speaking countries, Tyrol also has its own German-language dialect. The Tyrolean dialect comes from the Bavarian language. In South Tyrol, the Tyrolean dialect was mixed with a few individual Italian words. Due to the difficult accessibility of the valleys in earlier years, many other valleys developed a slightly differentiated dialect compared to the Tyrolean. The Ladin language also has no uniform language, so every valley also has a slight difference in Ladinia.

== Heraldry ==
Although the details of the arms of Tyrol have changed over the centuries, one feature has remained more-or-less constant: argent, an eagle displayed gules, armed (and sometimes crowned) or. Since 1983, the Province of South Tyrol has its own coat of arms. It is very similar to the coat of arms of the State of Tyrol. The Province wanted to emphasize the historical commonality of the countries. The Province of Trento received its coat of arms in 1340 and refers to the prince-bishopric of Trento. The former County of Tyrol had a uniform coat of arms, which was slightly changed over the centuries.

Coat of arms of Tyrol (State)

Coat of arms of the Province of South Tyrol

Coat of arms of the Province of Trentino

Coat of arms of the Region of Trentino-Alto Adige/Südtirol

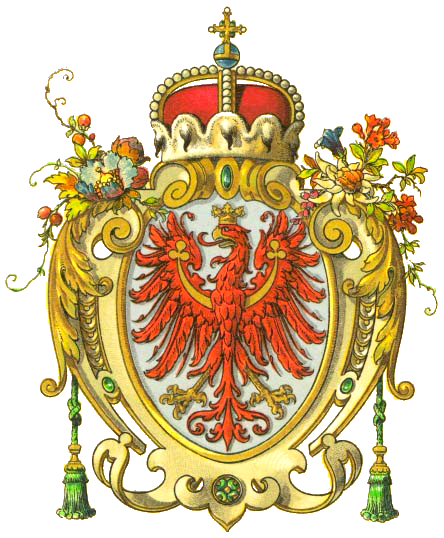
Coat of arms of the former County of Tyrol during the Austro-Hungarian Empire

== History ==
=== Prehistory ===
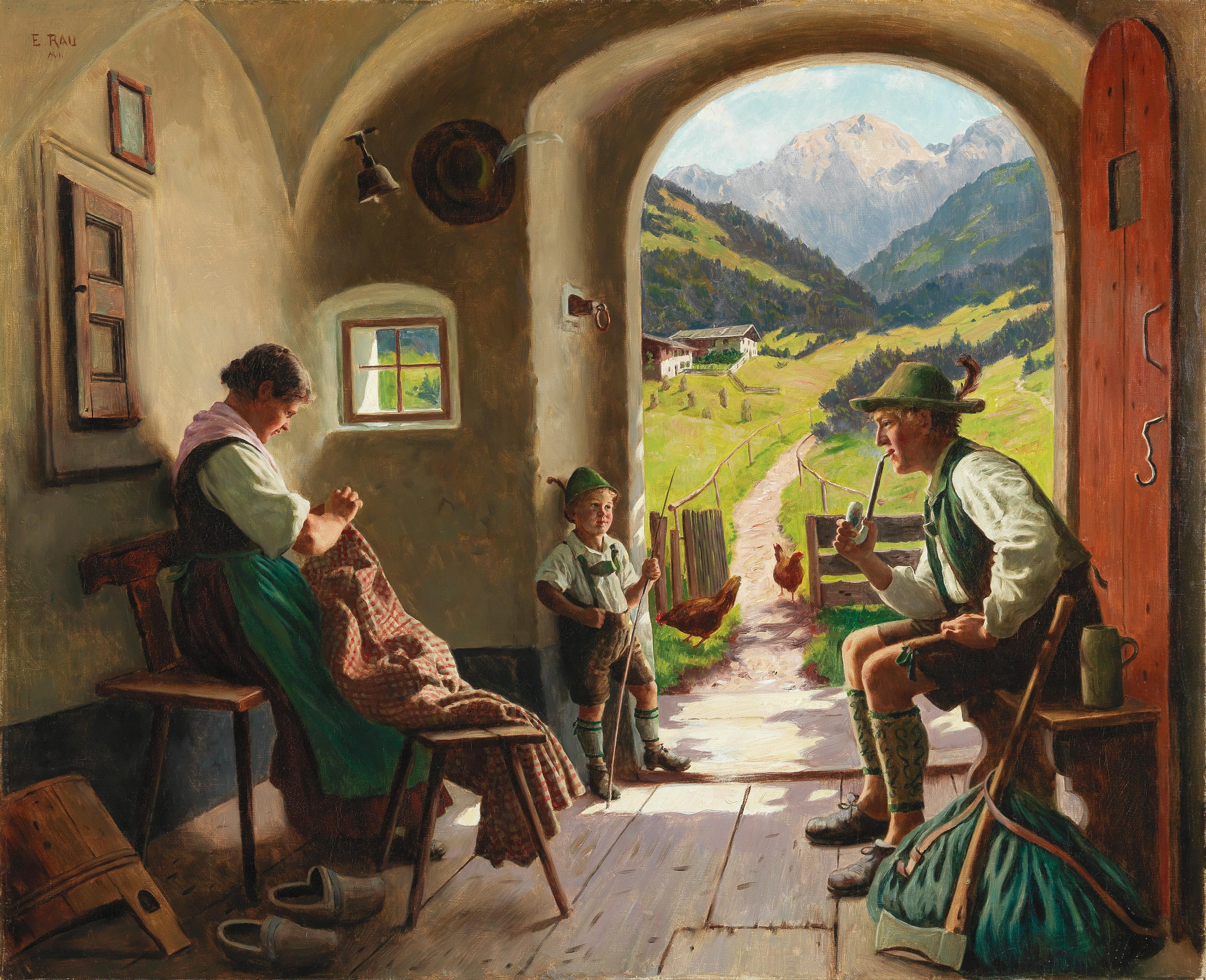
Traditional costumes of Tyrol, painting by Emil Rau (1858–1937)

The earliest archaeological records of human settlement in Tyrol have been found in the Tischofer Cave. They date from the Palaeolithic, about 28,000–27,000 BP. The same cave has also yielded evidence of human occupation during the Bronze Age (very roughly, 4000–3000 BP (2000–1000 BC)).

In 1991, the mummified remains of a man who had died around 3300–3100 BC were discovered in a glacier in the Ötztal Alps, in Tyrol. Researchers have called him Ötzi (and also other names, including "The Iceman"). He lived during the Chalcolithic or Copper Age, after man had learned how to exploit copper but before man had learned how to make bronze. His body and belongings were very well-preserved, and have been subjected to detailed scientific study. They are preserved in the South Tyrol Museum of Archaeology, Bolzano, South Tyrol, Italy.

There is evidence that Tyrol was a center for copper mining in the 4th millennium BC; for example, at Brixlegg. There is also evidence of the Urnfield culture (roughly 1300–750 BC).

Evidence of the La Tène culture (roughly 450–100 BC, during the Iron Age) has also been found; as has evidence of the Fritzens-Sanzeno culture from about the same period. Toward the end of that time, Tyrol began to be noted in Roman written records. The inhabitants may have been Illyrians, in the process of being displaced by Celts (perhaps themselves displaced from Noricum by Proto-Slavs). There are also indications that Adriatic Veneti may have been present in the south of the region. The Romans called them Rhaetians; although it is not clear whether that then meant a specific tribe or confederation of tribes, or was a broader term for the inhabitants of the area. They made wine barrels (an idea which the Romans took from them), and had their own alphabet.

=== Roman times ===
In 15 BC, Tyrol was conquered by Roman forces commanded by Drusus and Tiberius. The Romans established Raetia and Noricum as provinces of the Roman Empire. Raetia included Vinschgau, Burggrafenamt, Eisacktal, Wipptal, Oberinntal and parts of the Unterinntal. Noricum included Pustertal, Defereggen and parts of the Unterinntal to the right of the Ziller and the Inn. Bolzano and the extreme south of Tyrol belonged to the province of Venetia et Histria.

The inhabitants adopted the Latin Language called vulgar Latin or the everyday spoken version vs. the standardized written formal form, and combined it with their own languages. The result was Romansh, which is still spoken today and is one of the official languages of Switzerland.

The Romans constructed metaled roads guarded by forts through Tyrol to connect the Italian peninsula and the lands beyond; notably the Via Claudia Augusta and the Via Raetia. The Romans did not seem to find Tyrol an attractive area in which to build new towns, because there are few of them. One town they did build was Aguntum, near modern Lienz.

In late antiquity (from AD 476), Tyrol belonged to the Ostrogoths, and it was included in the Ostrogothic Kingdom. In 534, the Ostrogoths lost Meran, Vinschgau and Passer to the Franks. The Ostrogothic Kingdom collapsed in 553, after being overrun by Bajuvarians from the north and Lombards from the south. The Lombards established the Duchy of Tridentum (or, Trent; roughly corresponding to modern Trentino) and lower parts of south Tyrol. Slavic peoples, who had recently taken Carinthia from the Bajuvarians, settled in east Tyrol.

=== Middle Ages ===
Most of Tyrol came under the control of the Duchy of Bavaria (created c. 555). The southern parts, including Bolzano, Salorno, and the right bank of the Adige (including Eppan and Kaltern) remained under the Lombards. Tyrol was Christianized through the bishoprics of Brixen and Triento. The frontier remained the same through Carolingian and Ottonian times. The area was subject to Stammesrechte (Ancient Germanic laws), such as Lex Romana Curiensis, Lex Alamannorum, Lex Baiuvariorum and Leges Langobardorum.

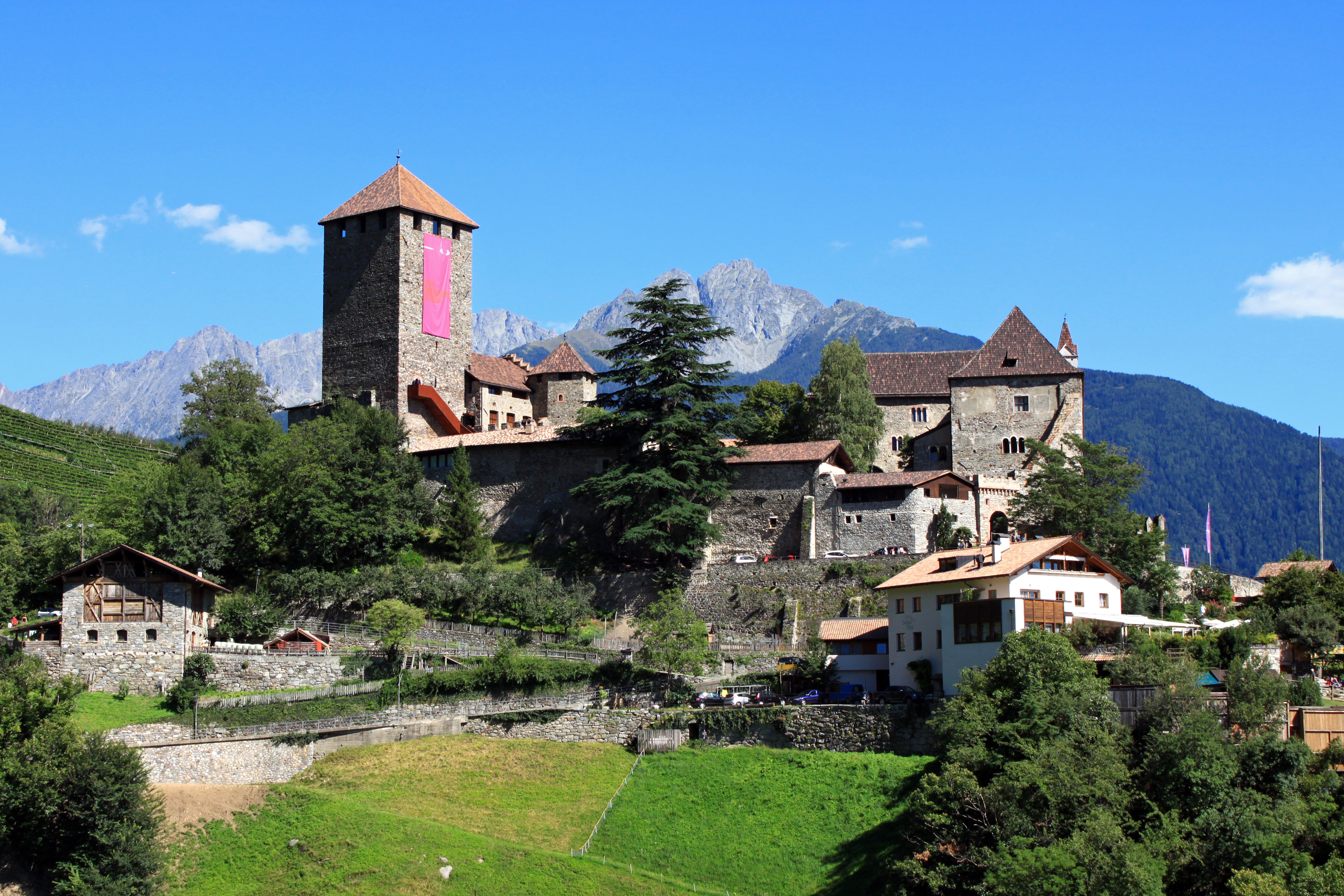
Tyrol Castle in Tirol, near Merano

In 1027, Emperor Conrad II, in order to secure the important route through the Brenner Pass, allotted the left bank of the Adige (from Lana to Mezzocorona) to the Duchy of Bavaria. During the 12th century, the local nobility went further: they built Tyrol Castle in the modern comune of Tirol in South Tyrol, near modern Merano; and around 1140, established the County of Tyrol as a state within the Holy Roman Empire.

The Counts of Tyrol were at first Vogt (underlords) subject to the Bishoprics of Brixen and Triento; but they had other ideas. They expanded their holdings at those bishoprics' expense. They displaced competing nobles like the House of Eppan, and declared their independence from the Duchy of Bavaria; though not without dispute. In 1228, they conceded the Saalforste to the House of Wittelsbach, rulers of Bavaria; as a result, that area remains part of Bavaria to this day.

In 1253, rulership of the County passed by inheritance to the Meinhardiner family. In 1335, the last male heir to the Meinhardiner lands, Henry of Bohemia, died. His daughter, Margaret, thereupon became Countess of Tyrol; but her title was in doubt because of different laws in different lands as to what a woman could or could not inherit. She navigated her way between the competing claims of the Houses of Wittelsbach, Luxembourg and Habsburg by, in 1342, marrying Louis of Wittelsbach. Louis died in 1361. Margaret died in 1369, and bequeathed Tyrol to Rudolf of Habsburg. The various dynastic squabbles were resolved that same year by the Treaty of Schärding, under which (for suitable compensation) the Wittelsbachs agreed to relinquish their claims to Tyrol in favour of the Habsburgs.

When the Habsburgs took control of Tyrol, it had roughly its modern size. However, the Unterinntal downstream from Schwaz still belonged to Bavaria; the Zillertal and Brixental to Salzburg; Brixen and the Pustertal were episcopal territories, or part of the County of Gorizia. On the other hand, the Montafon and the Unterengadin were Tyrolean.

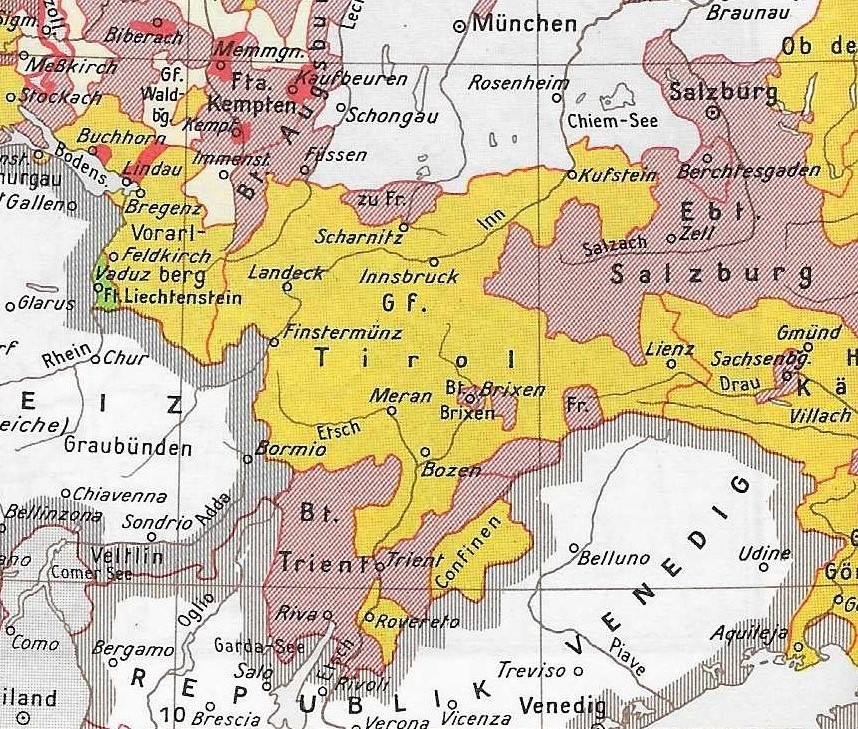
Map of the County of Tyrol in 1648

Tyrol was of great strategic importance to the Habsburgs. It controlled several important Alpine passes. It connected their landholdings in Further Austria. In 1406, as the Habsburg lands were split up by inheritance, Tyrol once again became a separate entity (a Landstand), in which the greater landowners had the right to be consulted (Mitspracherecht). During a confusing succession of events, in 1420 Frederick IV, Duke of Austria moved the capital of Tyrol from Meran to Innsbruck, and Meran lost its earlier importance.

=== Modern Tyrol ===
Tyrol's importance for the Habsburgs was underlined when the Tyrolean capital of Innsbruck became a centre of European politics and culture as Holy Roman Emperor Maximilian I took up residence there. From the mid-16th century, Tyrol was ruled by younger sons of the Habsburg Emperors, but in 1665, all Habsburg lands were again under the united rule of the Emperor Leopold I. From the time of Maria Theresa (1740−1780) onward, Tyrol was governed by the central government of the Habsburgs at Vienna in all matters of major importance. In 1803 the lands of the Bishoprics of Trent and Brixen were secularised and incorporated into the county.

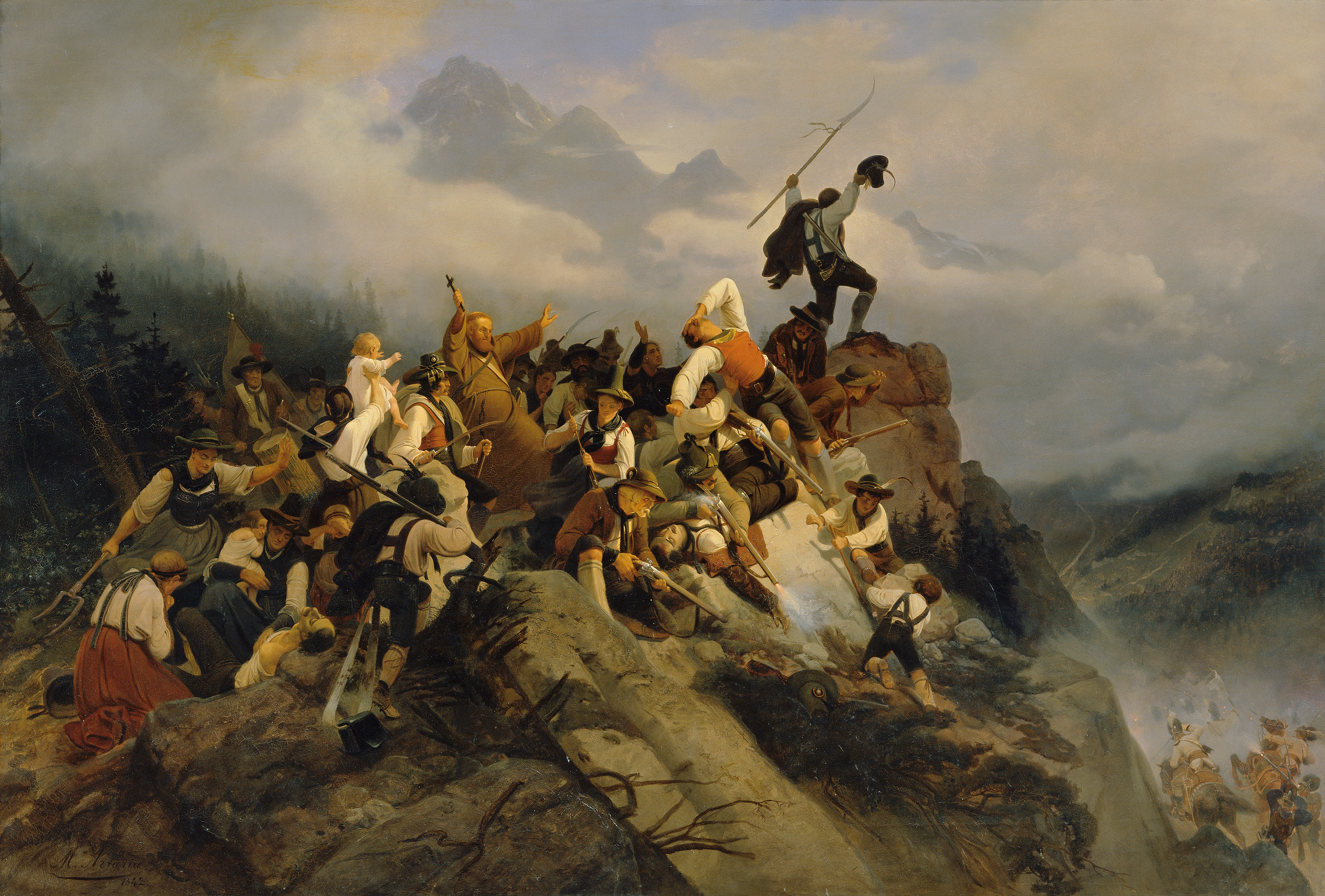
Tyrolean Rebellion against French and Bavarian troops

In the 19th century, Tyrol became an early pawn in the Napoleonic Wars during War of the Third Coalition. Following defeat by Napoleon at Battle of Austerlitz in 1805, Austria was forced to cede Tyrol to the Kingdom of Bavaria, and as a part of Bavaria, it became a member of the Confederation of the Rhine the following year. The Tyrolean Rebellion, a popular insurrection against Bavarian rule began in 1809, and throughout Tyrol, the Bavarian troops were killed or driven out. The Tyroleans, led by Andreas Hofer, fought mainly as mobile sharpshooters, but despite their success, Austria's defeat in the wider War of the Fifth Coalition confirmed Bavarian rule in Tyrol, but with southern Tyrol (roughly contemporary Trentino with Bozen and its hinterland) transferred to Napoleon's Kingdom of Italy.

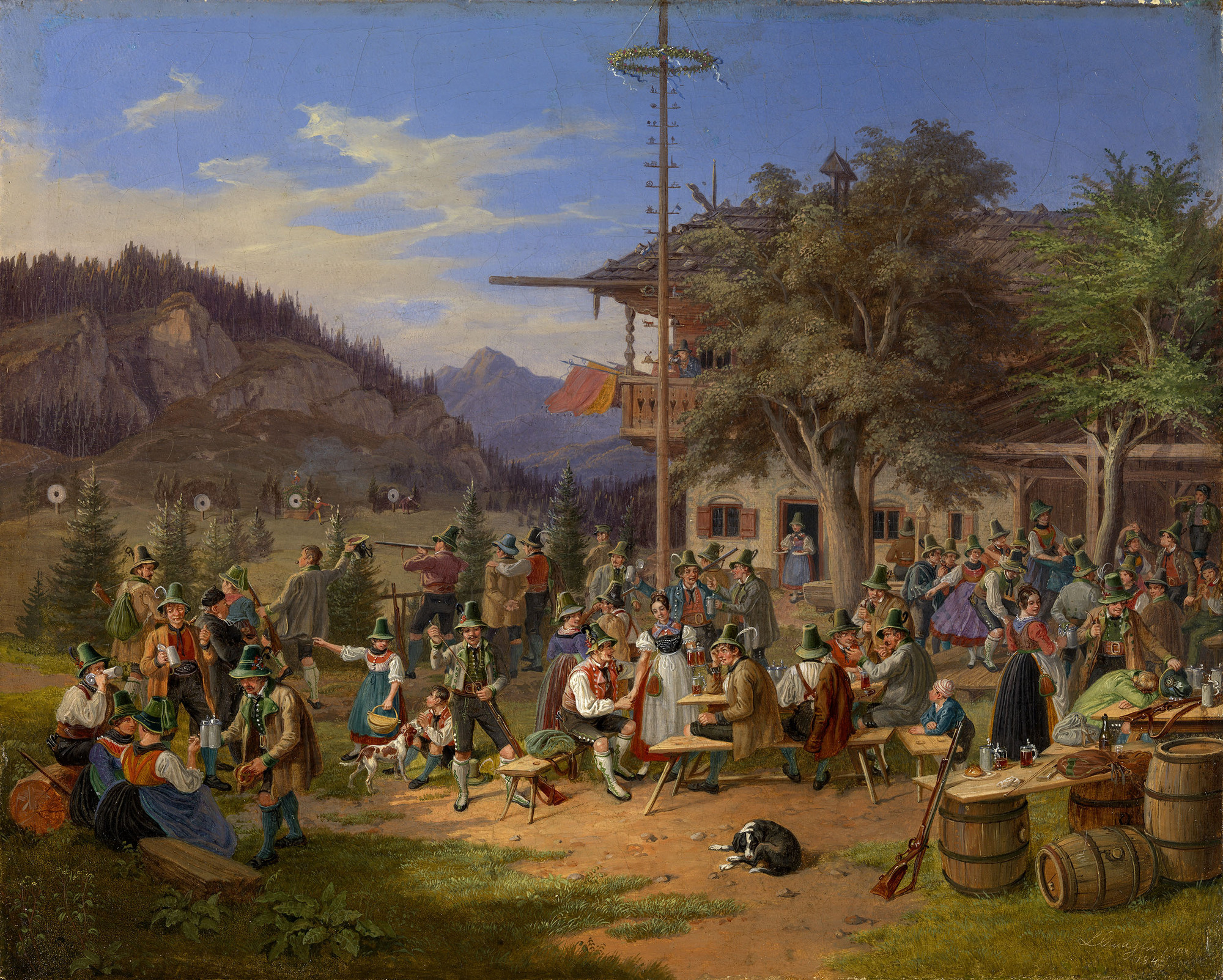
Tyrolean festival in the 19th century

Tyrol was reunified and returned to the Habsburgs following the downfall of Napoleon and decisions at the Congress of Vienna in 1814. Integrated into the Austrian Empire, from 1867 onwards, it was a Kronland (crown land) of Cisleithania, the western half of Austria-Hungary.

After World War I, the victors ruled in 1919 that the southern part of the Austrian crown land of Tyrol was to be ceded to the Kingdom of Italy, including the territory of the former Bishopric of Trent, roughly corresponding to the modern-day Trentino, as well as the southern part of the medieval County of Tyrol county, the present-day province of South Tyrol. Italy thus took control of the strategically important Alpine water divide at the Brenner Pass and over the south of Tyrol proper with its large German-speaking majority. The remaining northern and eastern parts of Tyrol became the state of Tyrol in the new rump Austrian republic. In 1945 following World War II, Austrian attempts and South Tyrolean petitions to reunite South Tyrol with Austria were not successful, but from 1972 onward, the Italian Republic has granted further autonomy to the Trentino-Alto Adige/Südtirol region.

== Politics ==
=== Tyrol–South Tyrol–Trentino Euroregion ===
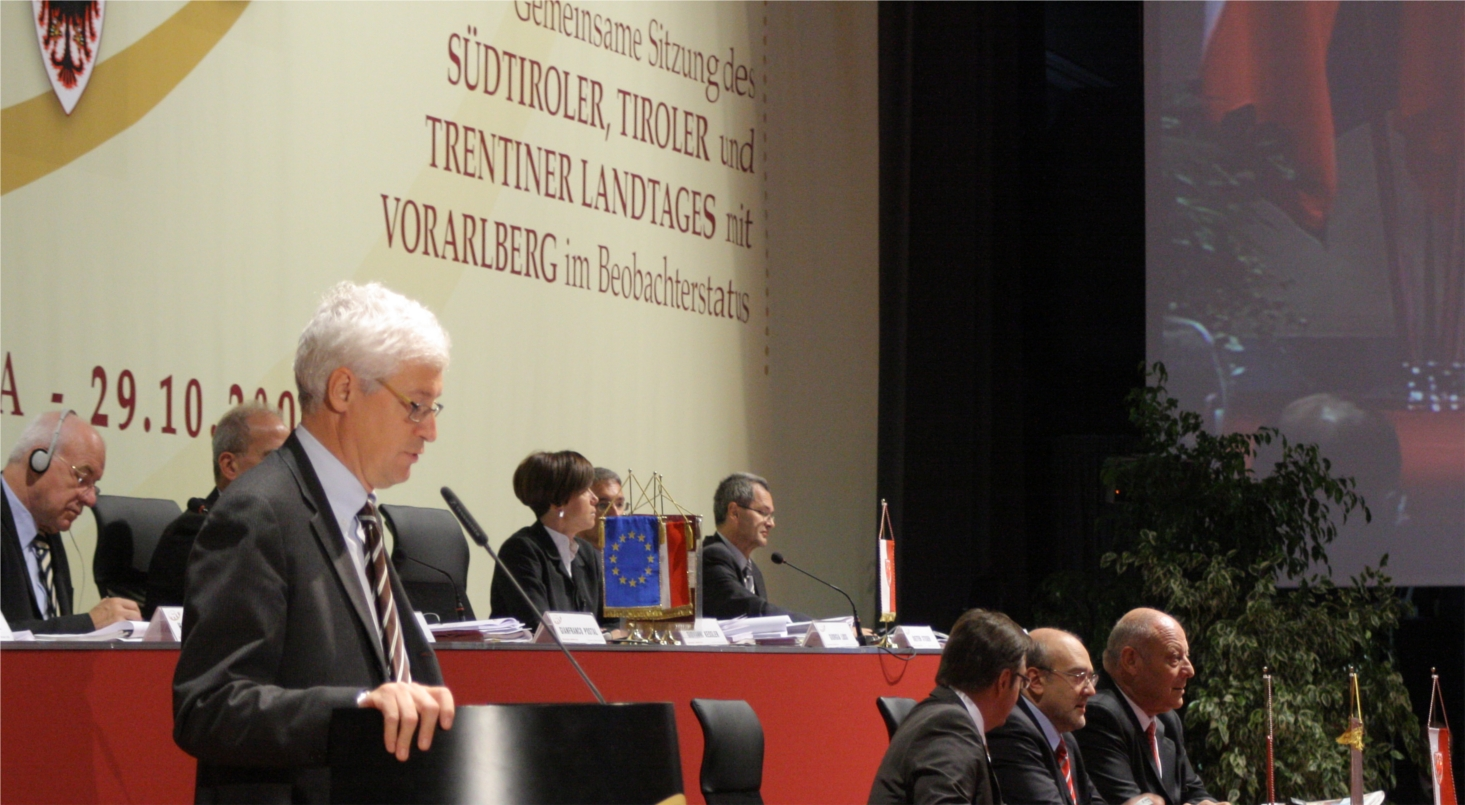
Dreier-Landtag

The Tyrol–South Tyrol–Trentino Euroregion was founded in 1998. The aim is to strengthen cooperation between the separated countries. In several areas, such as mobility, agriculture, education and culture will be tried to promote exchange and to raise the awareness of the cultural and historical heritage of the region of Tyrol in the minds of the population. Cross-border projects will be initiated to improve the relationship between the different language groups. To represent common ideas and values in Europe, the Euroregion has a joint office in Brussels since 1995. The headquarters of the office is in Bolzano. Joint decisions are taken by organized three diet (in German: Dreier-Landtag), which have been held since 1991 mostly every two to three years with the state Diets of Trento (provincial council of Trentino), Bolzano (provincial council of South Tyrol) and Innsbruck (state council of Tyrol (State)). In 2011, the region was institutionalized and since then has its own legal entity.

=== Political parties ===
Political parties in the Italian part of Tyrol (provinces of Bolzano and Trento) include:

- Partito Democratico (PD)
- Südtiroler Volkspartei (SVP)
- Movimento Cinque Stelle (M5S)
- Lega Nord (LN)
- Greens
- South Tyrolean Freedom
- Die Freiheitlichen
- Trentino Tyrolean Autonomist Party (PATT)

The Austrian part of Tyrol shares the Austrian party system:

- Tiroler Volkspartei; organization of the ÖVP in the state of Tyrol, which has dominated local politics since 1945
- Social Democratic Party of Austria (SPÖ)
- Freedom Party of Austria (FPÖ)
- The Greens – The Green Alternative
- NEOS

The multiplicity of parties is due to the fact that Tyrol lies in two different nation states and thus are politically independent of each other. Another reason for the large number of parties is the great independence of the two Provinces of Bolzano and Trento. By the second statute of autonomy in 1972, the province of Bolzano acquired much of the region's competences and since then has been mostly independent of the province of Trento. The second autonomy statute enabled the linguistic minorities to be better protected. The Regional council of Trentino-Alto Adige/Südtirol, which consists of the two provincial councils of Bolzano and Trento, has less influence and competences. Thus, many parties determine their focus within the provinces. Other parties in Trentino-Alto Adige/Südtirol, especially in South Tyrol, were founded on the example of Austrian parties and have many similarities with the parties in Austria.

== Economy ==
In the economic sector statistics are shown, which are based largely on numbers and data of the Tyrol–South Tyrol–Trentino Euroregion. It lacks individual communities that are outside the Euroregion. As there are no 10,000 inhabitants living in these communities, the statistics hardly distort the territory of Tyrol and the remaining 1.8 million inhabitants.

Tyrol had a total GDP of 67.6 billion euros in 2014. Divided into individual countries, the State of Tyrol generated 28.8 billion euros, the Province of South Tyrol 20.6 billion euros and the Province of Trentino 18.2 billion euros. In GDP per capita (2015), that means 39,300 euros/capita in the State of Tyrol, 42,400 euros/capita in South Tyrol and 35,500 euros/capita in Trentino. The unemployment rate in the State of Tyrol is 3.2% (2014), in South Tyrol 3.4% (2017) and in Trentino 4.6% (2017). The Tyrol region is one of the wealthiest regions in Europe and, in terms of GDP/capita, is above the EU average, which amounted to 28,900 euros/capita in 2015. The Region of Trentino-Alto Adige/Südtirol is, in terms of GDP/capita, the wealthiest region in Italy with 37,813 euros/capita in 2015.

=== Primary sector ===
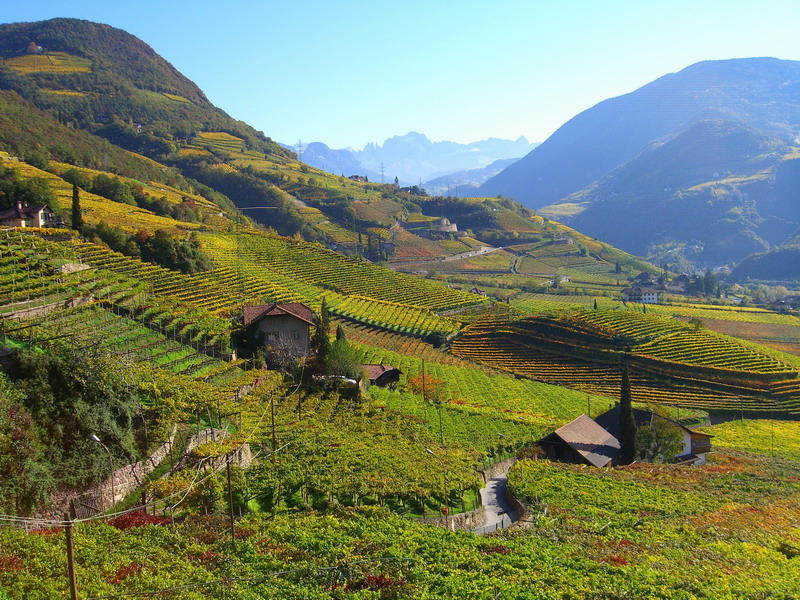
Vineyards in Bolzano

Agriculture and forestry occupy a special position in Tyrol. The many small and medium-sized farms have shaped the landscape and culture in Tyrol for many centuries. In order to be competitive with larger farms outside Tyrol, there is a strong cooperative system in Tyrol. South of Tyrol, in the Region of Trentino-Alto Adige/Südtirol, the cultivation of apples and wine plays an important role. So every tenth apple in Europe comes from South Tyrol. Known wines in Trentino-Alto Adige/Südtirol are the Vernatsch, the Lagrein, the Gewürztraminer and the Weißburgunder. Livestock, grazing and forestry are important at higher elevations and in more northerly areas. Mainly cattle, sheep, goats and pigs are kept. Accordingly, the production of milk and Tyrolean Speck in the farms is very important. Horses also play an increasingly important role in livestock, for equestrian sports and farm holidays. The Haflinger horses are known in the Tyrolean region and originate from Hafling, near Merano.

=== Secondary sector ===
The first industrialization reached Tyrol late in the 19th century. Most of these were small businesses that were important only in the local area. A second wave of industrialization took place at the beginning of the 20th century. Particularly affected at that time was the city of Bolzano with the Italianization policy under Fascism in the 1920s.

In 2011, approximately 10% of the workplaces in all parts of the country were active in the manufacturing sector. Thus lies Tyrol in the EU average at 10.3% (2011). Important branches of industry in Tyrol are the food industry, wood processing and mechanical engineering. The industry in Tyrol consists mostly of small and medium-sized companies. The craft still plays a special role throughout the region. A large part of these craft businesses are still partially small-structured and family businesses. From an economic point of view, the energy sector is important in the secondary sector. Much of the electricity produced is generated by hydropower.

=== Tertiary sector ===
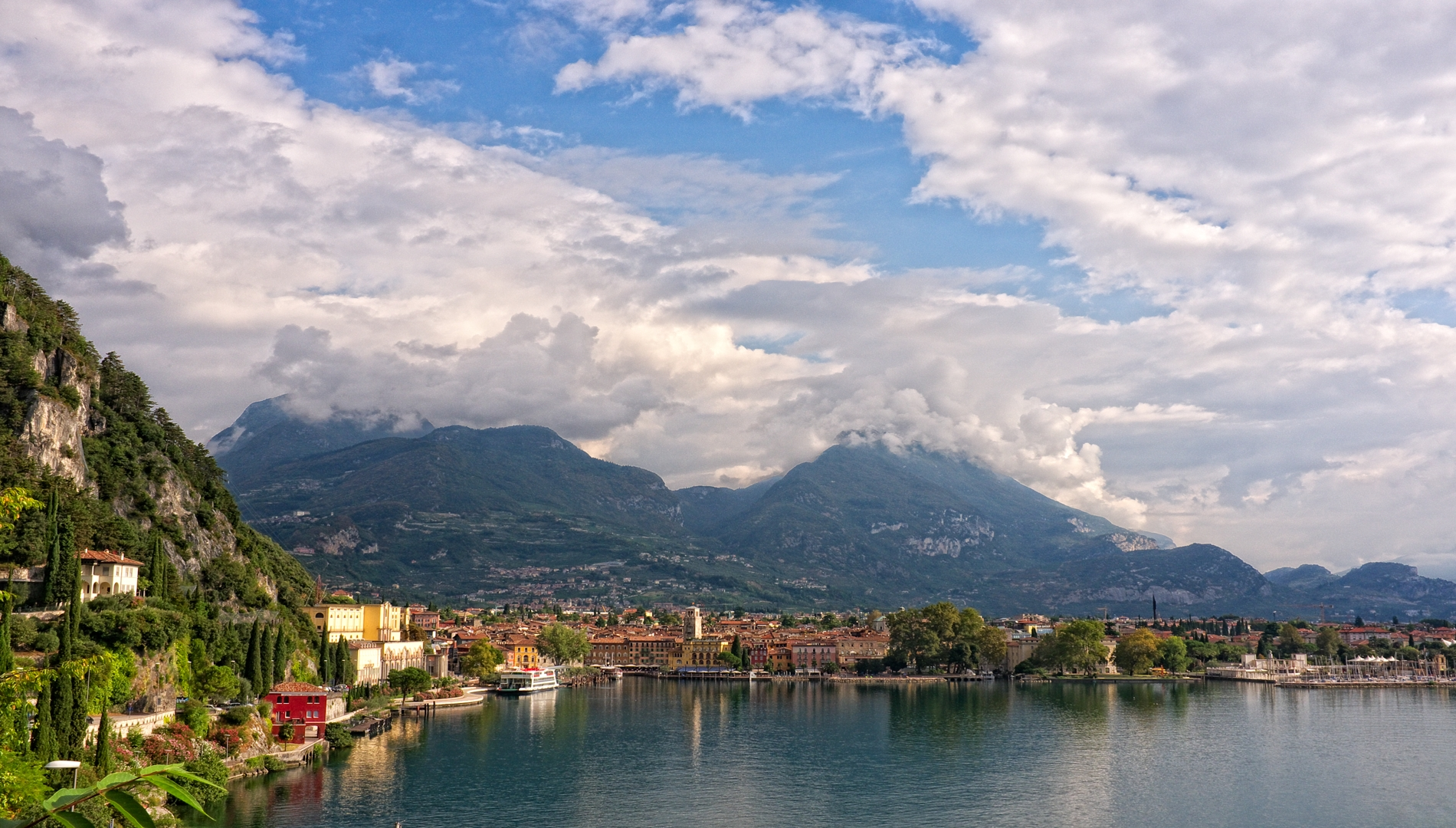
A known city for tourism: Riva del Garda on Lake Garda

The most important sector in Tyrol is the tertiary sector. Especially tourism has a special position in this region. Due to the connection of the areas by the railway in the 19th century, many villages in Tyrol developed into popular tourism locations. The construction of the Brenner motorway in the 1960s gave the region in the 20th century a renewed upswing in the tourism branch. Today, Merano, Kitzbühel, Cortina or Riva del Garda are among the most important tourism destinations in the Alpine region. In 2013, the Euroregion counted over 80 million overnight stays in the Tyrolean region (to compare, Province of Rome in 2011: 25.8 million overnight stays).

Also important for Tyrol is the trade. Among other things, the Exhibition of Bolzano has been a meeting point for Italian and German economy already for centuries. As a transit route country, more than 2.25 million trucks (2017) drove over the Brenner Pass. This means that two times more trucks travel on the Brenner Route than in all four Alpine crossing roads in Switzerland together.

== Transport ==
Tyrol is known as a transit route. The most important route between northern and southern Europe, the Brenner route, traverses the entire region. At 1370 m above the Adriatic, the Brenner Pass is the lowest pass crossing of the main chain of the Alps. Due to the linguistic diversity and the climatic transition from temperate climate (alpine climate) to mediterranean climate, the area is regarded as a bridge between the Italian and German speaking countries.

=== Airports ===
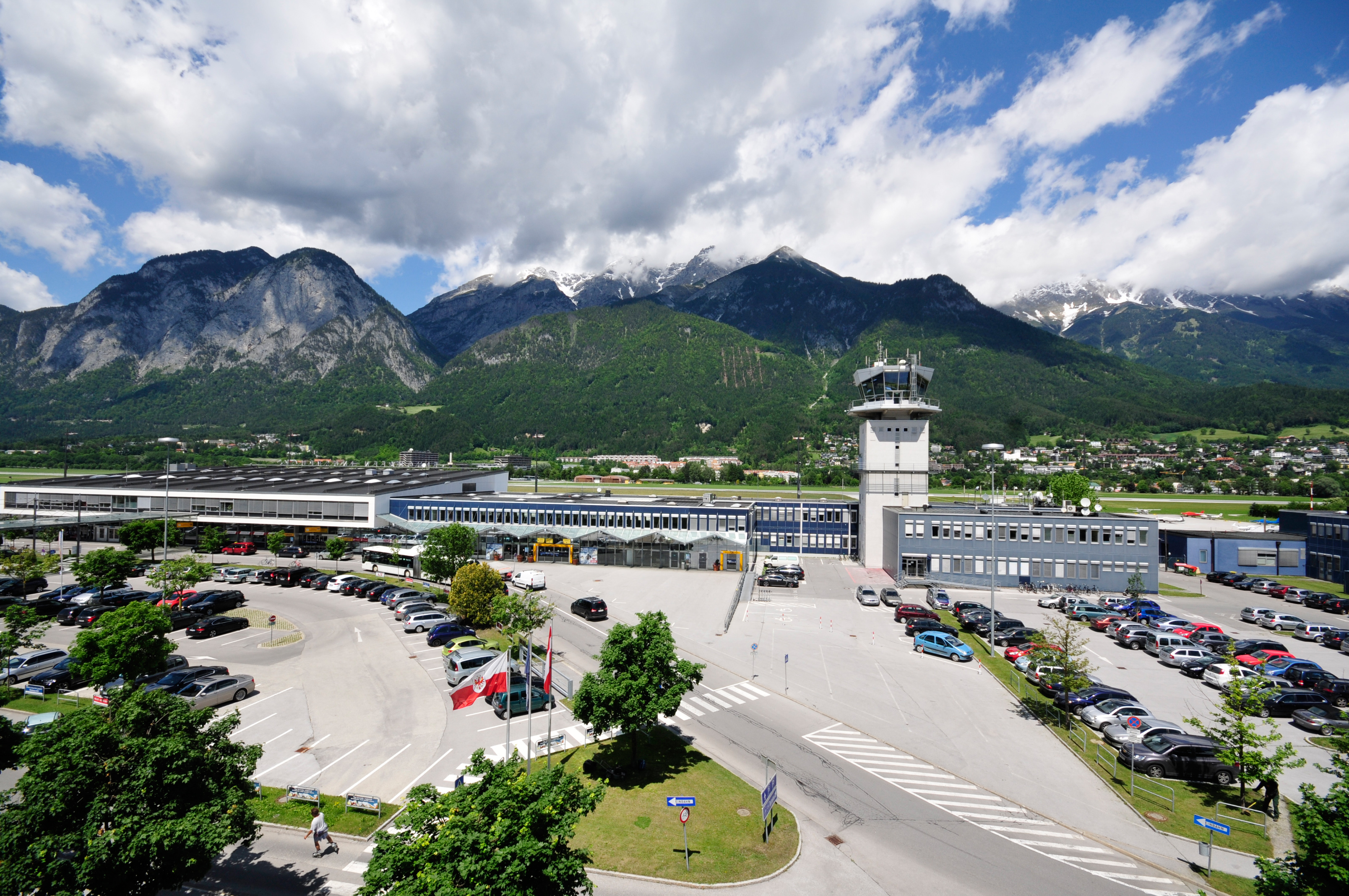
Innsbruck Airport

The most important airport in Tyrol is Innsbruck Airport. With over one million passengers, it is the third largest airport in Austria. Other airports in the region are in Bolzano and Trento. These do not offer regular scheduled flights and the Bolzano Airport currently offers charter flights. There are other small airfields in Toblach, Kufstein, St. Johann in Tirol, Reutte and Cortina. The airfield in Cortina was closed in 1976 due to a crash.

=== Road transport ===
Highways in Tyrol are the Brenner motorway and the Inntal motorway. The Brenner motorway runs from Innsbruck (in Austria A13) to Modena (in Italy A22). Together with the Inntal motorway from Innsbruck to Kufstein is the part of the European route E45. The dual carriageway from Merano to Bolzano (MeBo) ends in Bolzano South in the Brenner motorway. Important road section in Trentino, next to the Brenner motorway, is the SS 47 (Strada Statale 47), which connects via Sugana Valley Trento with Padua. A large part of this route is dual-lane and flows into the Brenner state road (SS 12). Due to the Alps, there are many mountain passes that connect valleys. The most important pass roads for transit trade are the Reschen Pass and Brenner Pass. Popular pass roads include the Stelvio Pass, Arlberg Pass, Karer Pass, Mendel Pass and the Gardena Pass. The Provinces of Trento and Bolzano have been responsible for the preservation and management of the state roads in their provinces since 1998.

=== Railways ===
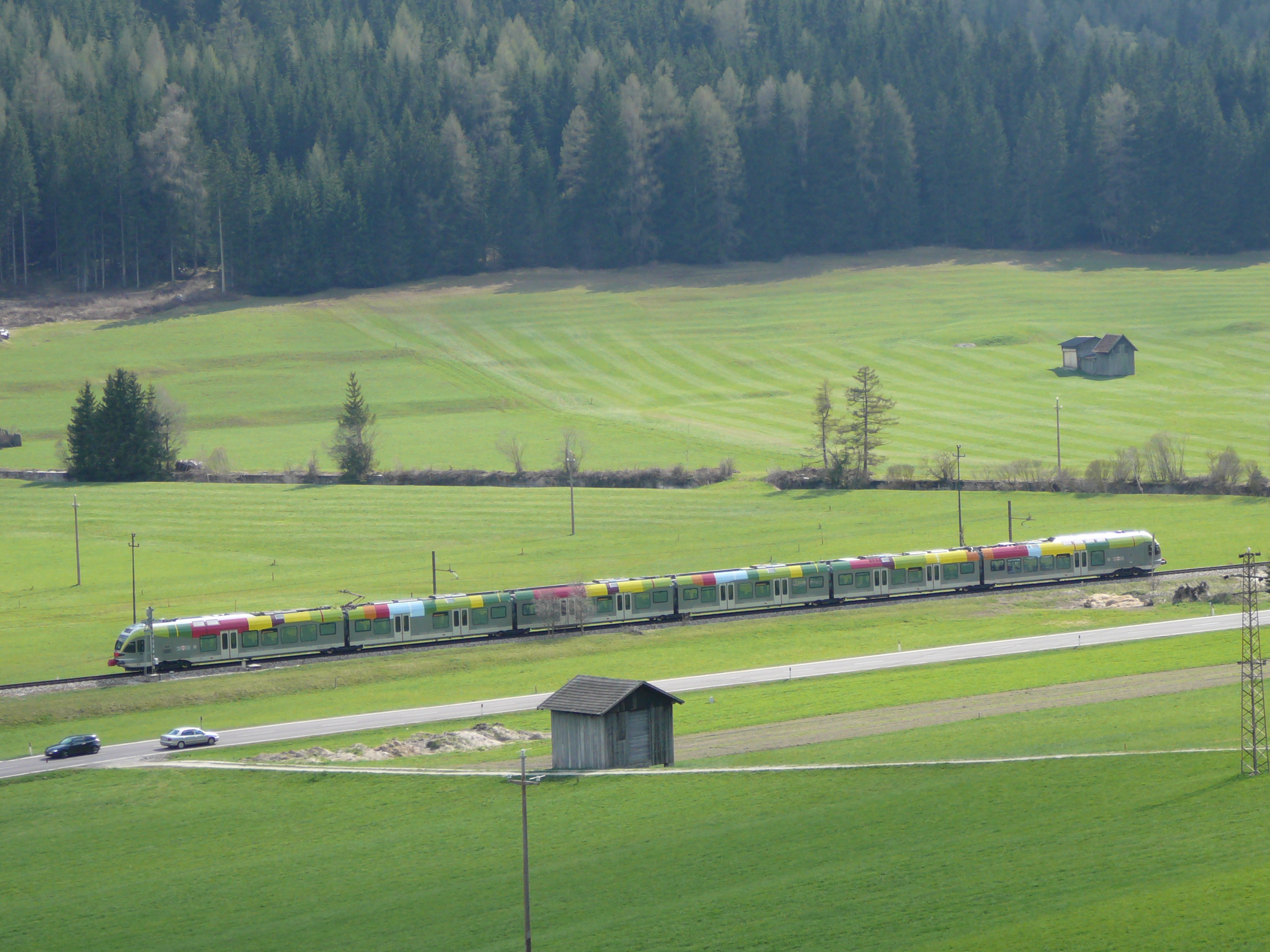
Pustertal railway

The most important railway line in Tyrol is the Brenner Line via the Brenner Pass. The Brenner Railway was opened in 1867 and runs from Innsbruck to Verona via the cities of Bolzano and Trento. Together with the Lower Inn Valley Railway in North Tyrol, this section of the route is part of the important European railway axis Berlin-Palermo, which connects northern Europe with southern Europe across the Alps. With the construction of the Brenner Base Tunnel and its completion in 2027, transit traffic on the rail will be promoted and relocated. After completion, the Brenner Base Tunnel, together with the Innsbruck bypass, will be the longest railway tunnel in the world at 64 km and will reduce the travel time between Bolzano and Innsbruck from 2 hours to 45 minutes.

Further important railway lines in Tyrol are the Arlberg railway, Zillertal railway, Salzburg-Tyrol railway, Pustertal railway with continuation of the Drautal railway, the railway line Bolzano-Merano and the continuation of the Vinschgau railway, the Trento–Malè–Mezzana railway and the Valsugana railway, which leads from Trento to Venice over the Sugana Valley. Cross-border connections are offered only a few. The ÖBB travels over the Brenner Pass on the Eurocity trains and several regional trains connect South Tyrol with North Tyrol an East Tyrol. The Euroregion Tyrol-South Tyrol-Trentino has set itself the goal of promoting and expanding cross-border connections. The aim is to shift traffic through the Alps to sustainable means of transport, thus protecting the Alpine environment.

=== Local public transport ===
Many villages and communities are difficult to reach because of the large differences in altitude, so the region sets much on ropeway concepts. Although most of the cable cars are located in ski resorts, they are also used for the local public transport. Known cable cars in Tyrol are the Ritten cable car in Bolzano, the Sardagna cable car in Trento and the Nordkette cable car in Innsbruck. Also funicular railways are being built to cope with the differences in altitude more quickly. Famous funiculars are among others the Hungerburgbahn in Innsbruck and the Mendel funicular in Kaltern.

Local public transport is usually offered with intercity buses or city buses. The city of Innsbruck has its own tram network. Another tram is located in Ritten. The cities of Bolzano, Merano and Trento formerly had their own tram network, but these were displaced and replaced by the city buses and private transport in the 50s and 60s.

== Culture ==
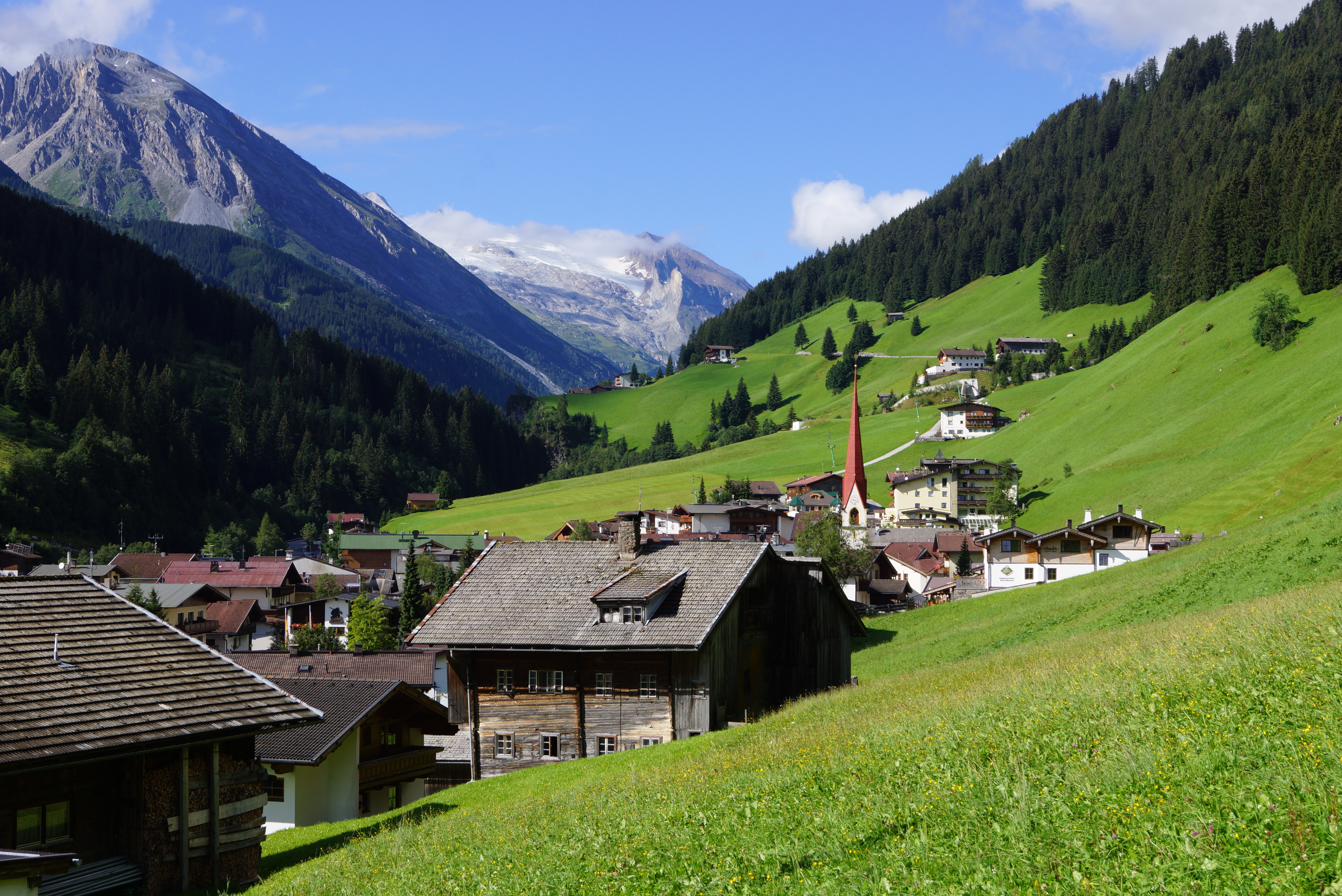
A typical alpine village in the Tuxertal valley of Tyrol

The Tyrolean culture has been cultivated for several centuries and passed on to future generations. The state border between South and North Tyrol is more a political border and is considered less as a cultural border. Many traditions are cultivated throughout the Tyrolean region and show little differences. In all cultural areas such as food, dress or customs there are many similarities. Nevertheless, the individual language groups, especially the minority languages, try to maintain and promote their own linguistic identity.

=== Tyrolean cuisine ===
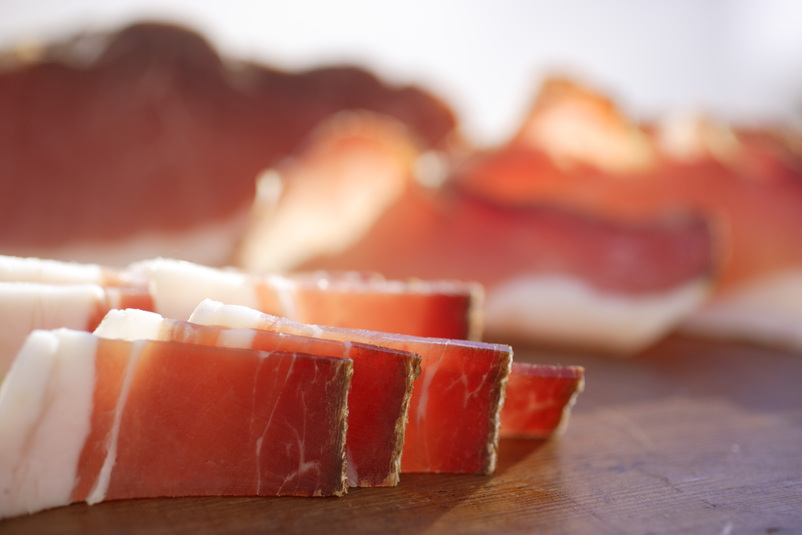
South Tyrolean Speck

The Tyrolean cuisine has similarities with the Austrian cuisine and is characterized by its alpine influence. Also the historical influence of the former K.U.K. Monarchy can be found in the Tyrolean dishes. These include dishes such as goulash, Kaiserschmarrn and apple strudel which are consumed in large parts of the Danube monarchy and today still in Tyrol. Since the region is still relatively strong agricultural and peasant today, also many peasant dishes are offered on the farms. Schlutzkrapfen, boiled dumplings or cold cuts with bacon (in German: Speck) or grey cheese is eaten on the farms.

The Tyrolean dishes show only slight differences throughout Tyrol. Due to the Mediterranean conditions in the southern part of Tyrol, a lot of wine is grown and is therefore also an important part of the Tyrolean dish, especially in South Tyrol and Trentino. Famous wines from this area are the Gewürztraminer, Pinot Blanc, Pinot Grigio and Chardonnay. Furthermore, a lot of apples are grown in the Region of Trentino-Alto Adige/Südtirol. In this region also a food culture is cultivated with a mixture of Italian and Tyrolean specialties.

=== Tyrolean Rifles ===
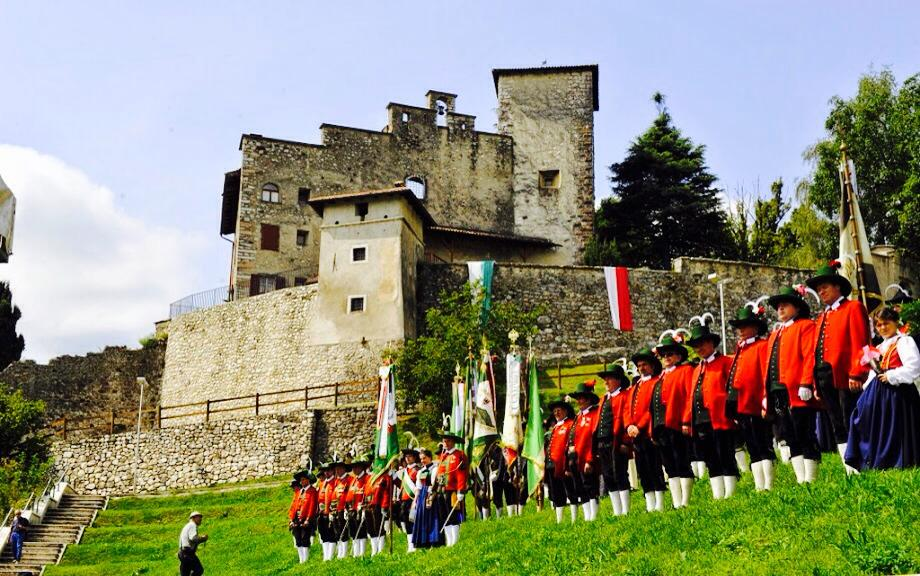
Trentino Rifle Company in front of Castle of Castellano

The Tyrolean Rifles were a militia organized in case of an attack on crown land, which required Tyrol to defend its territory. The militia consisted mostly of citizens and peasants who were responsible only for the defence of their own land and were not obliged to go to war on behalf of the Habsburg monarchy. They were authorized by an order signed by Emperor Maximilian I in 1511 that remained valid until 1918. The Tyrolean Rifles became known in 1809 when Tyrolese peasants rose up and fought against the French-Bavarian occupation under Napoleon. The ensuing four Battles of Bergisel were led by Andreas Hofer. The Rifles were also used in World War I in 1915 on the Dolomite front. After the separation of Tyrol and the downfall of the monarchy, the companies also lost their task of defending their country. Nevertheless, they remained as a non-governmental organization. Today, the Rifles are responsible as an organization for the preservation of the Tyrolean culture and are always present at important political events in Tyrol.

=== Customs ===
Many Tyrolean customs were created centuries ago and are passed on by the population for the next generations. Typical in the Alpine region are the many individual customs in the valleys. Due to the seclusion of the valleys, the locals developed their own customs. Many customs have been created by legends and narratives, others by the close connection to the church. There are also traditions that are cultivated everywhere in the Tyrolean region and do not differ from other valleys and villages. These customs give local people an identity and thus feel the community more connected.

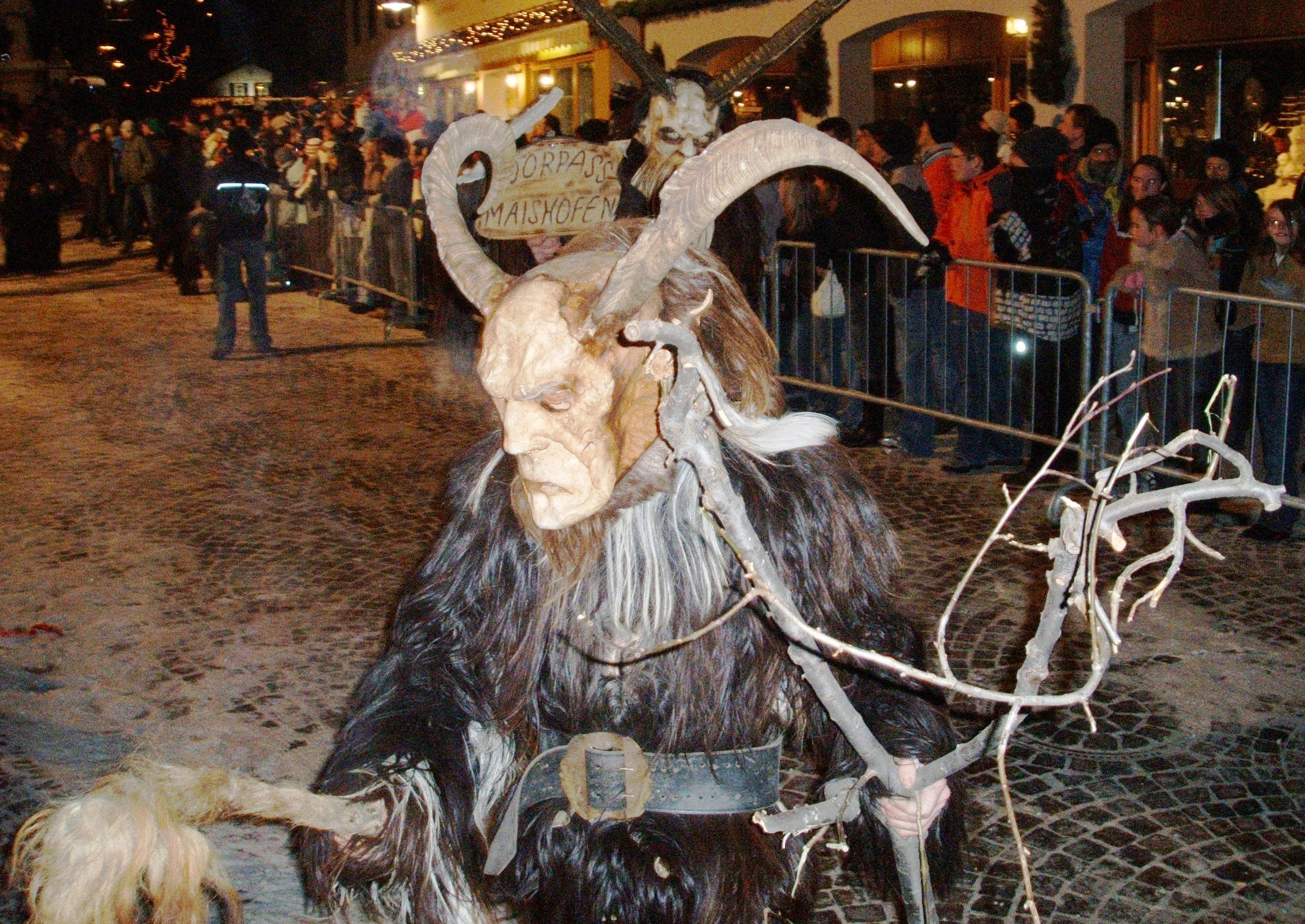
Krampus in Dobbiaco. Typical in the alpine region.

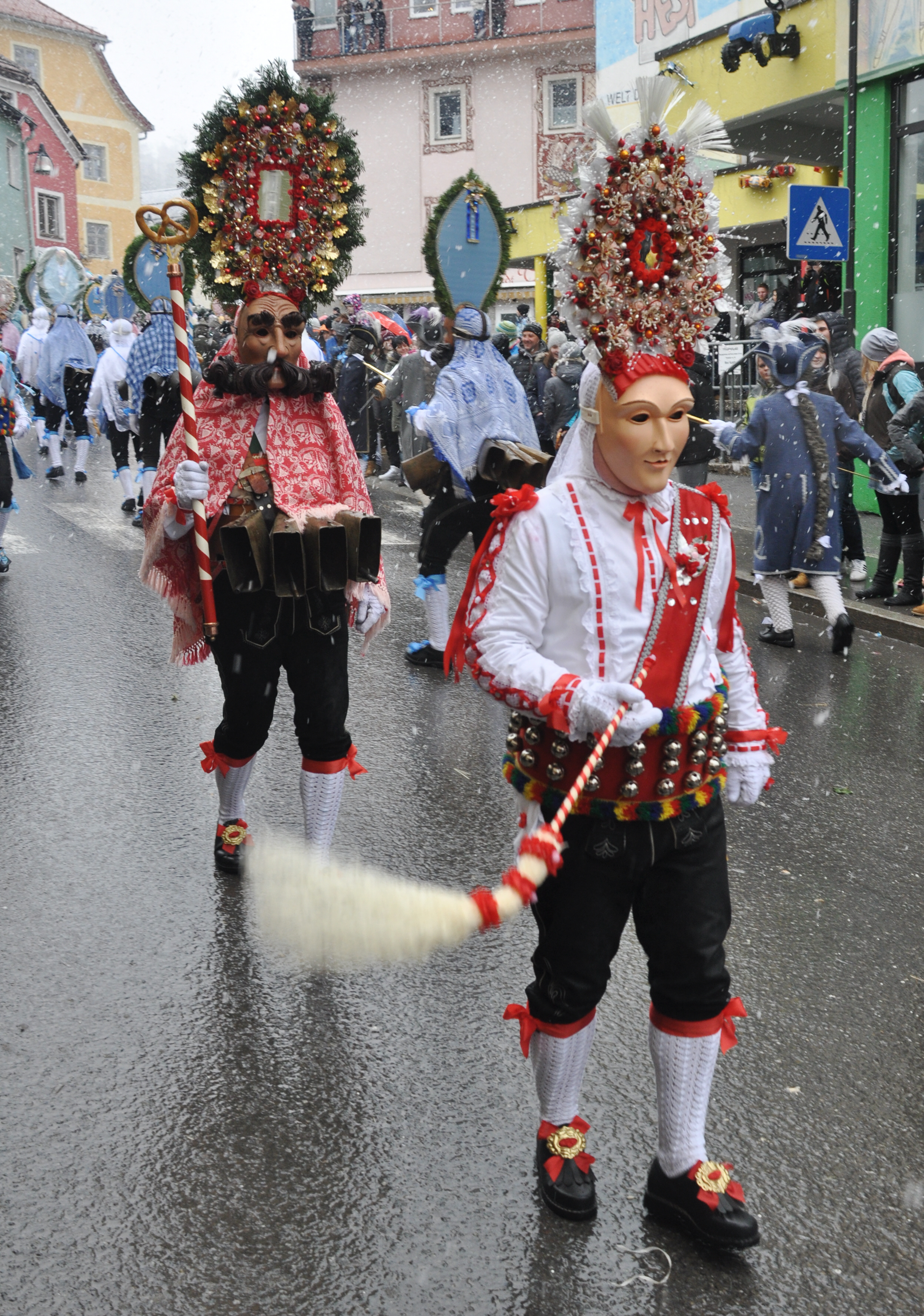
Imster Schemenlaufen in Imst

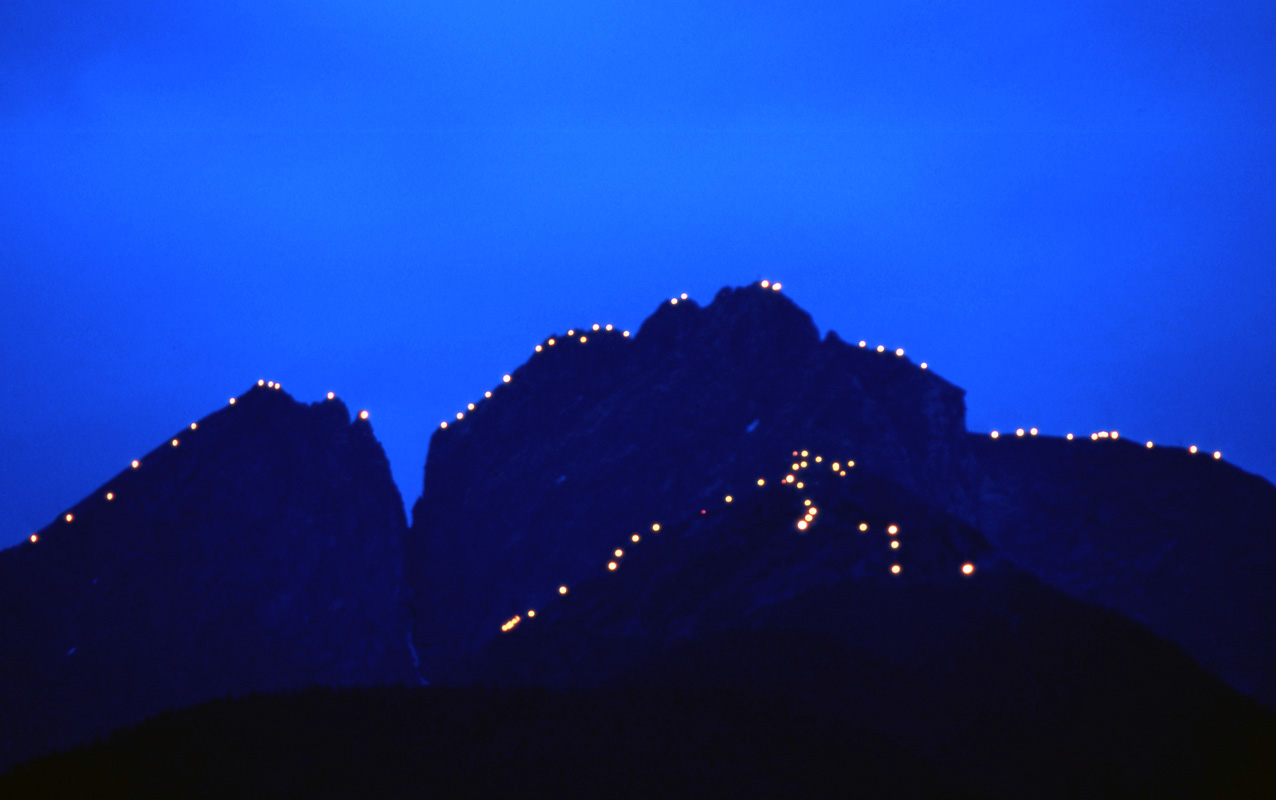
Herz Jesu Fire in whole Tyrol

== Sports ==
Tyrol is traditionally a winter sports country. Many athletes, such as Gustav Thöni, Benjamin Raich, Carolina Kostner, Gregor Schlierenzauer, Toni Sailer and Armin Zöggeler have won overall World Cups and medals at World Championships and Olympic Games. Even in summer sports, several athletes from Tyrol were and still are among the best in the world. In water jumping Tania Cagnotto and Klaus Dibiasi won several medals. In cycling, Francesco Moser won the Giro d'Italia. Andreas Seppi played against the best tennis players in the world for many years. In bouldering Anna Stöhr was one of the best in the world. Many Tyrolean mountaineers such as Reinhold Messner and Hans Kammerlander influenced the alpinism.

=== Football ===
FC Wacker Innsbruck is one of the most traditional and successful clubs in Austria. Since the club was founded in 1915 and several name changes, the football club has won the Austrian Championship ten times and the Austrian Cup seven times. In 1987, it reached the semi-finals of the UEFA CUP. In 1970, the team defeated Real Madrid in Madrid. Currently (2018) Wacker Innsbruck plays in the "Erste Liga" (second highest league of Austria).

In the Region of Trentino-Alto Adige/Südtirol, the FC Südtirol and AC Trento are the two most important clubs. Both teams have spent the majority of their history between the Italian Serie C (third highest league in Italy) and the league below, Serie D, although the former reached Serie B in 2023 for the first time. AC Trento has a long history as it was founded in 1921, whereas FC Südtirol was founded in 1995.

=== Ice hockey ===
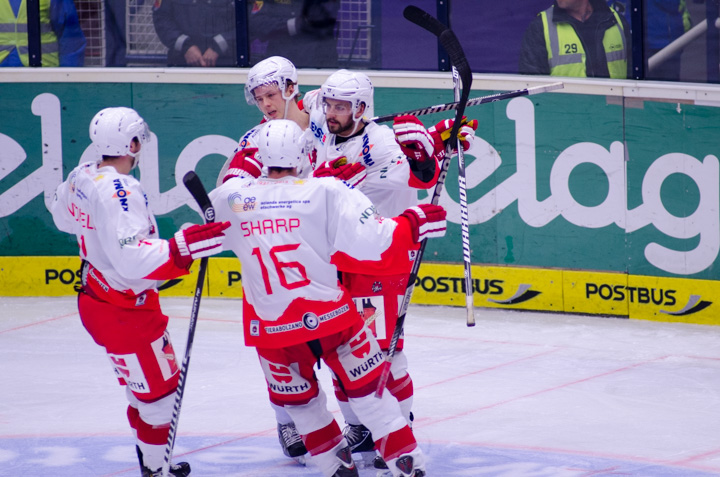
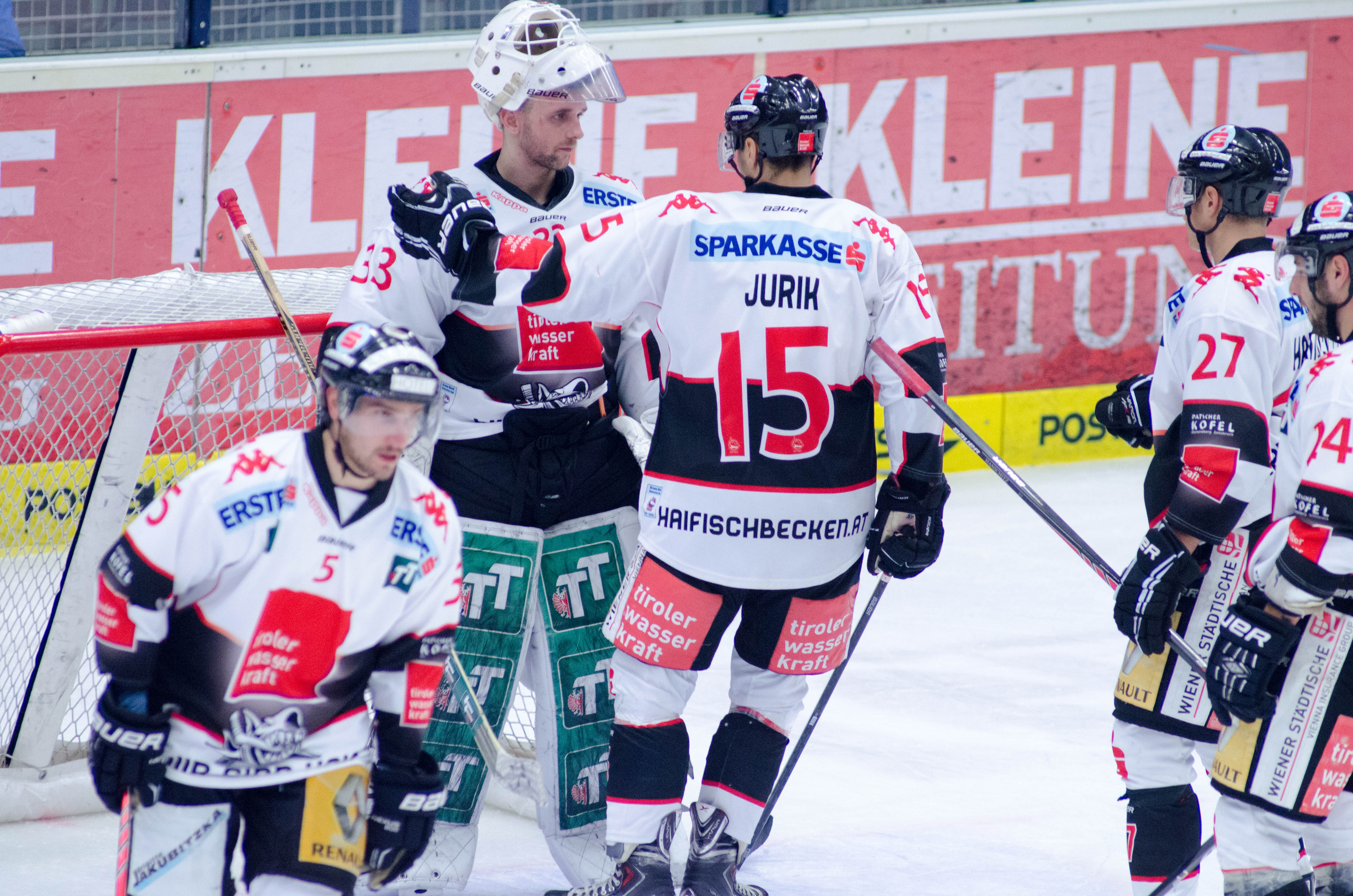
Tyrolean derby; HC Bolzano against HC Innsbruck in the EBEL.

Ice hockey is a very popular sport in Tyrol. Important clubs are the HC Bolzano and the HC Innsbruck. Both teams play in the EBEL. The HC Innsbruck, formerly EV Innsbruck, won the Austrian championship seven times. With 19 won Italian championships, the HC Bolzano is the record champion in Italy. The club celebrated the biggest international successes by winning the Alpenliga, the EBEL and the Six Nations Tournament with Jaromír Jágr. The Italian ice hockey league consists mostly of South Tyrolean teams. 5 of the 8 Italian teams in the Alps Hockey League come from South Tyrol (HC Neumarkt-Egna, HC Pustertal, Ritten Sport, HC Gardena and WSV Sterzing Broncos). In this league, three more Tyrolean teams play (SG Cortina, HC Fassa and EC Kitzbühel).

In 2005, the Ice Hockey World Championship was held in Innsbruck and Vienna. The 1994 Ice Hockey World Championship took place in Bolzano, Canazei and Milan.

=== Volleyball ===
In volleyball, Trentino Volley is one of the best teams in the world. Three times the Champions league title, four times the club world championship title and four times the Italian championship title could win the club from Trento. Founded in 2000, the club quickly established itself at the top of the league. In 2011, Trentino Volley won the CEV Champions League ahead of its own fans at the PalaOnda in Bolzano.

Hypo Tirol Innsbruck conquered the Austrian title 10 times. Of the last 13 seasons, the team won 10 times the Austrian championship. Since the season 2017/18 the club plays in the German volleyball league under the name "Hypo Tirol Alpenvolleys Haching". The club went into cooperation with the German team TSV Unterhaching.

=== Sports events ===
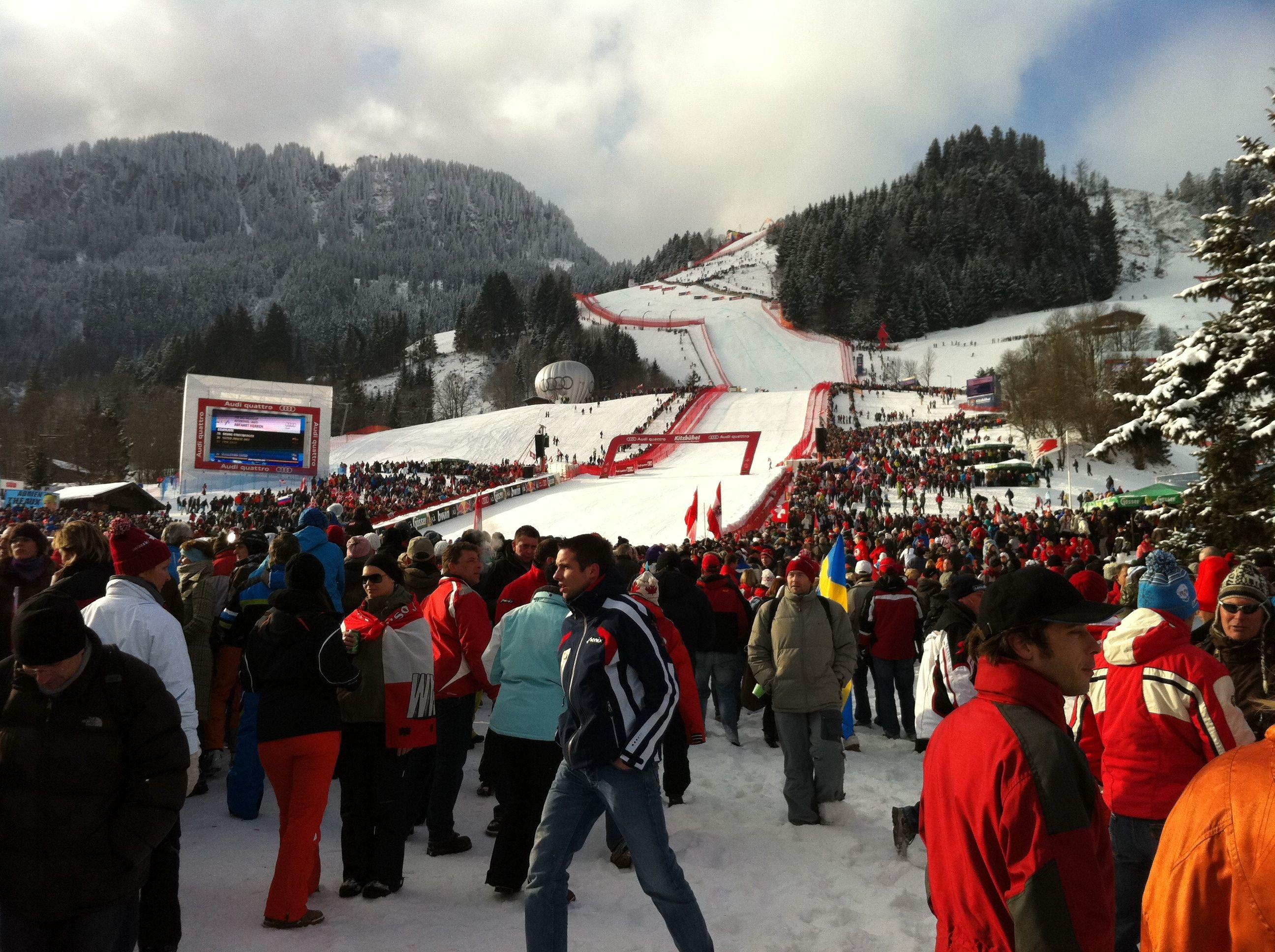
Alpine Skiing World Cup in Kitzbühel

In Tyrol, the Olympic Winter Games have been organized four times so far. In 1964 and 1976 they were held in Innsbruck and Cortina in 1956 and 2026 (alongside Milan). Most of the big annual sporting events in Tyrol take place in winter. The Alpine Skiing World Cup is held in Kitzbühel, Val Gardena, Cortina and Madonna di Campiglio. These races are classics in the Ski World Cup and have a long tradition. A famous biathlon location is in Antholz. There were often held the Biathlon World Championships. Several Nordic Combined World Championships were organized in Val di Fiemme. Part of the Four Hills Tournament is the Bergisel Ski Jump in Innsbruck. A stage of the Tour de Ski is also located in Toblach.

Some summer sports events are also held in Tyrol. The Tour of the Alps take place every year in Tyrol. The tour was launched by the Euroregion Tyrol-South Tyrol-Trentino. It is the successor of the Giro del Trentino, which has been around for over 40 years. In 2017, the UCI Downhill World Championships took place in Val di Sole, near Trento. The BOclassic in Bolzano takes place on New Year's Eve and is one of the best occupied New Year's Eve races in the world. Every year, an ATP World Series tennis tournament is organized in Kitzbühel.

== Universities and research institutions ==
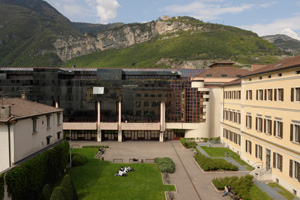
Faculty of Economics – University of Trento

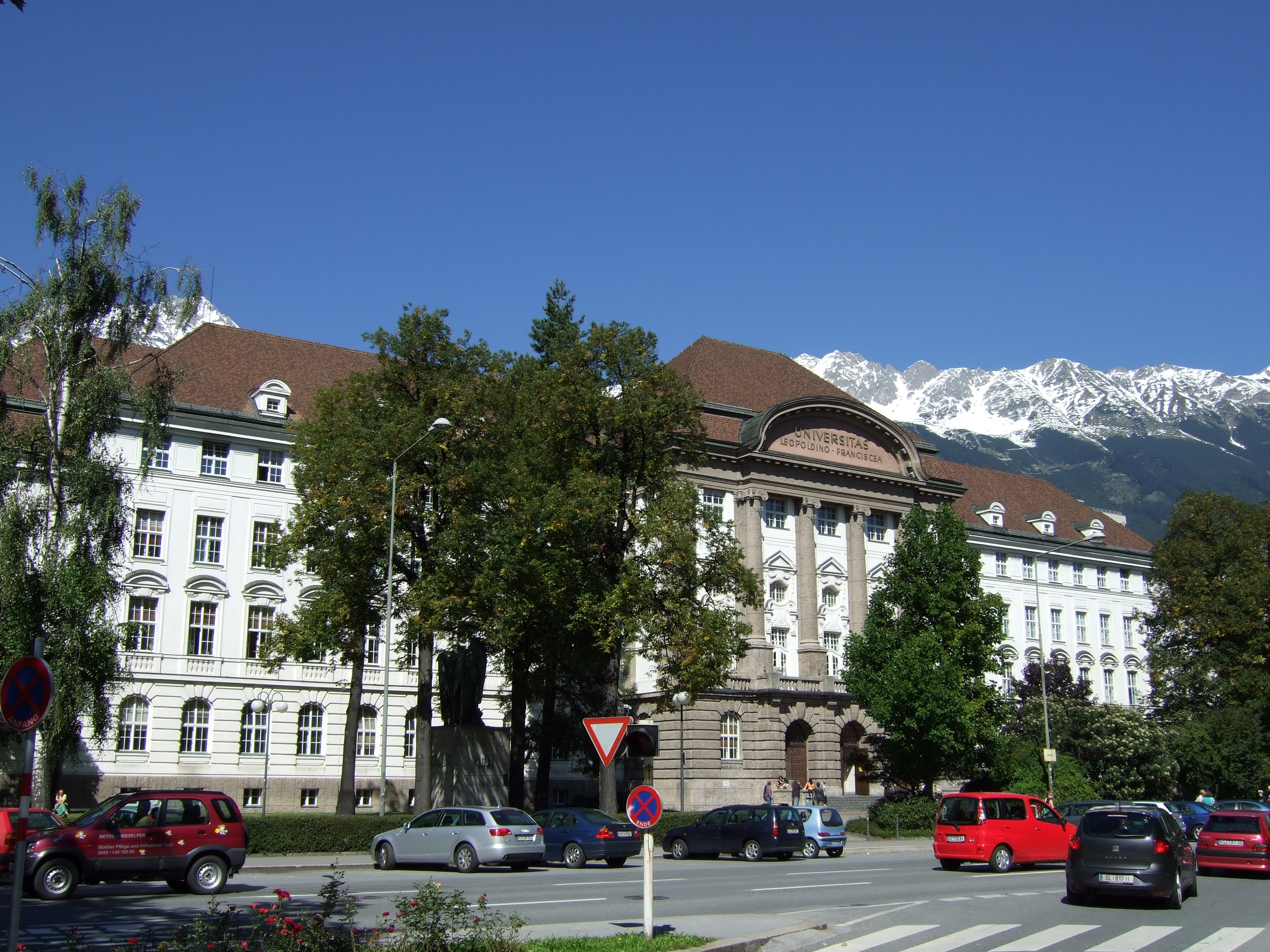
Main building of University of Innsbruck

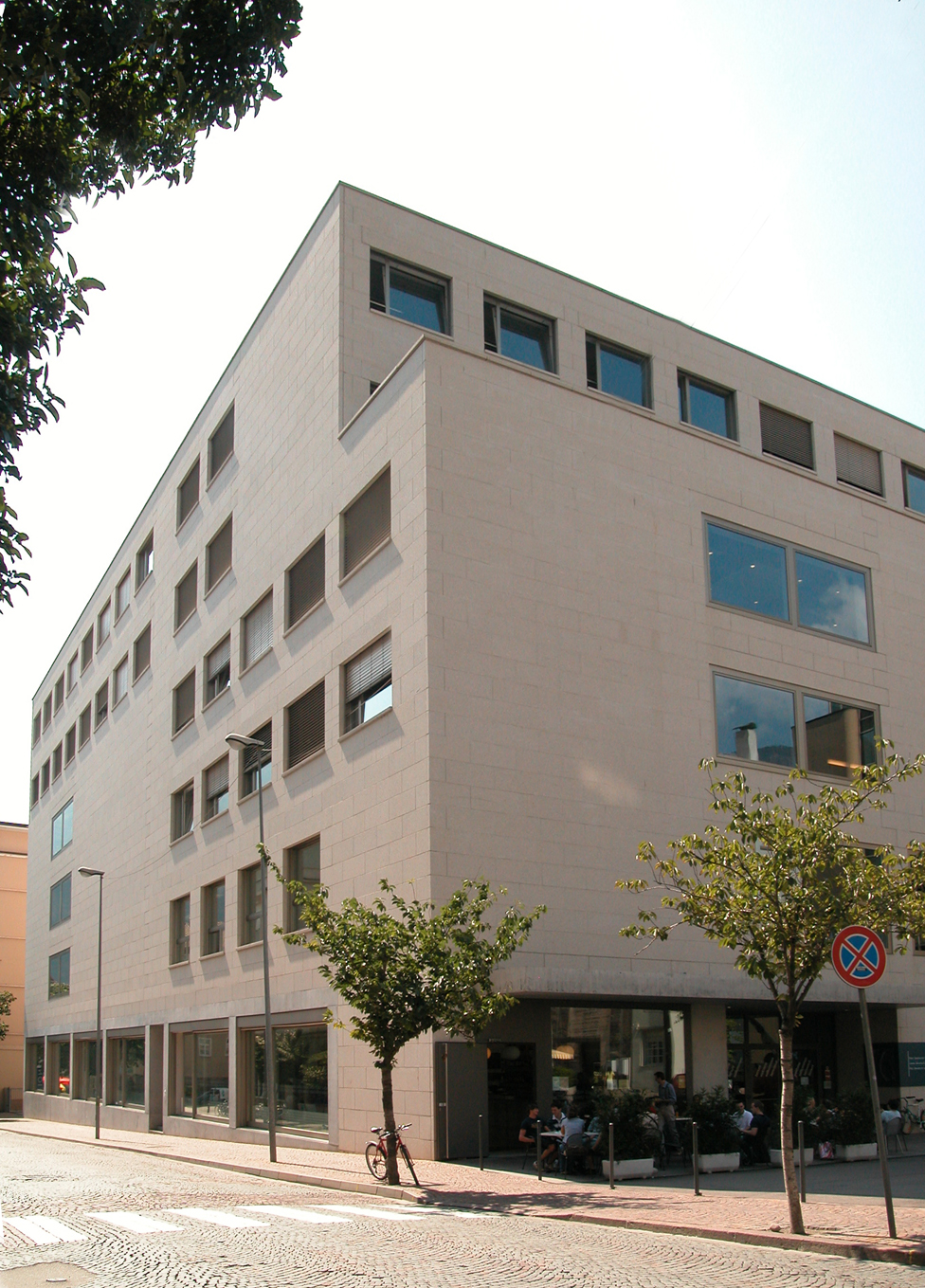
Main building of Free University of Bozen-Bolzano

=== Universities ===
- University of Innsbruck
- University of Trento
- Free University of Bozen-Bolzano
- UMIT – Private University for Health Sciences, Medical Informatics and Technology
- Medical University of Innsbruck

=== Colleges ===
- Philosophical-theological Academy Brixen
- Conservatory "Claudio Monteverdi"
- Tyrolean State Conservatory
- University of Applied Sciences Kufstein
- Health university of Applied Science Tyrol
- MCI Management Center Innsbruck
- Pedagogical University of Applied Science Tyrol
- Ecclesiastical Pedagogical University of Applied Science – Edith Stein
- State College of Health Professions "Claudiana"

=== Independent research institutions ===
- Institute for Interdisciplinary Mountain Research, a facility of Austrian Academy of Sciences
- Eurac Research
- NOI Techpark
- Foundation Bruno Kessler
- Edmund Mach Foundation
- Research-Center Laimburg

== See also ==
- County of Tyrol
- Tyrol–South Tyrol–Trentino Euroregion
- Austria–Italy border
