= Pedemonte =

- Comune
- Comune di S.Pietro in Cariano
- Location within Italy Location within Veneto
- Coordinates: 45°55′N 11°19′E
- Country: Italy
- Region: Veneto
- Province: Verona (VR)
- Frazioni: Brancafora, Carotte, Casotto, Ciechi, Longhi, Scalzeri

Area
  - Total: 12 km^{2} (4.6 sq mi)

Population (2018-01-01)
  - Total: 829
  - Density: 69/km^{2} (180/sq mi)
- Time zone: UTC+1 (CET)
  - Summer (DST): UTC+2 (CEST)
- Postal code: 36040
- Dialing code: 0445
- ISTAT code: 024076
- Website: Official website

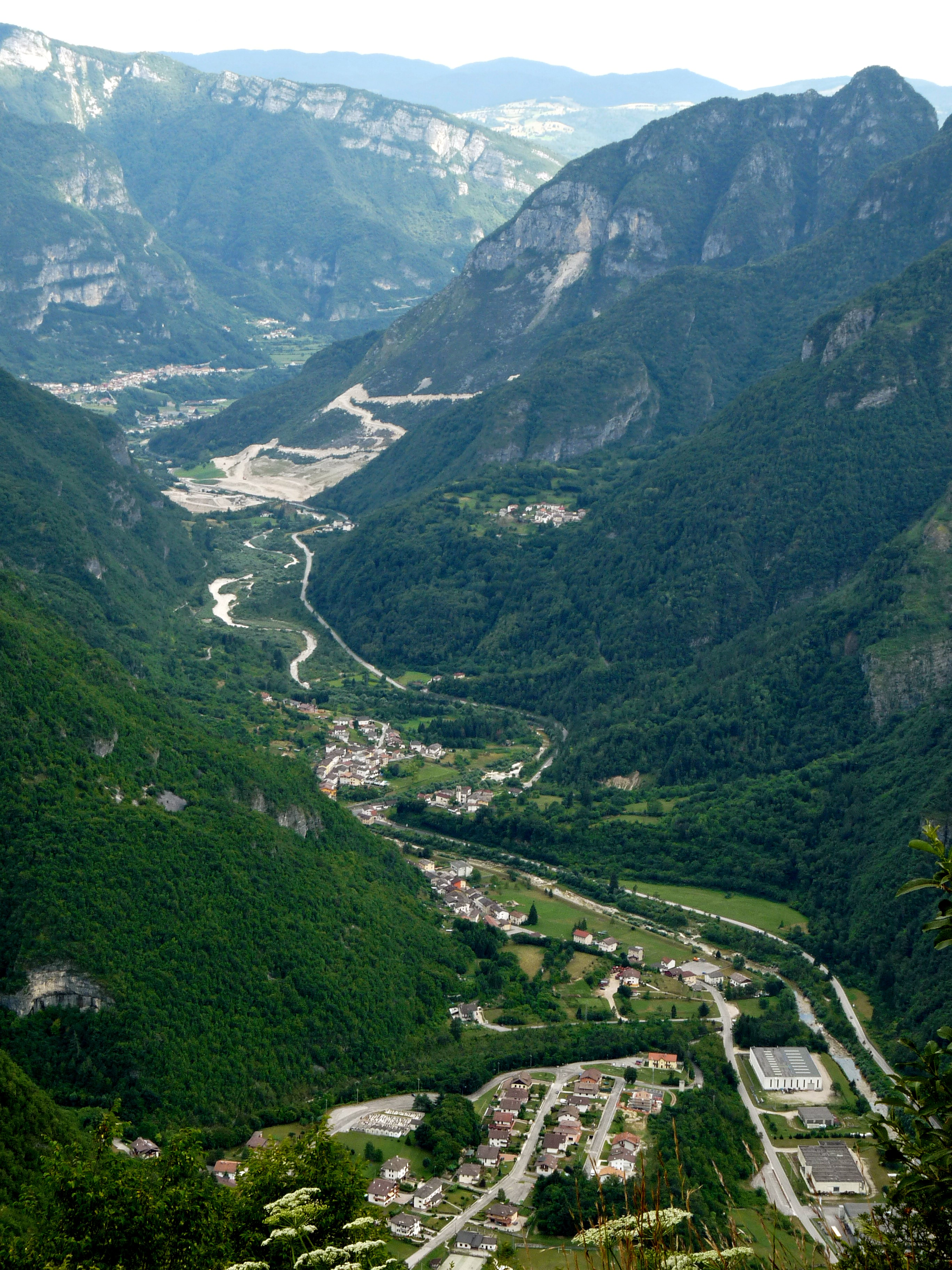
Pedemonte seen from Forte Belvedere Gschwent

Pedemonte is a town in the province of Verona, Veneto, Italy. It is north of SP350.

== Sources ==
- (Google Maps)
