= Sand in Taufers =

- Comune
- Marktgemeinde Sand in Taufers; Comune mercato di Campo Tures
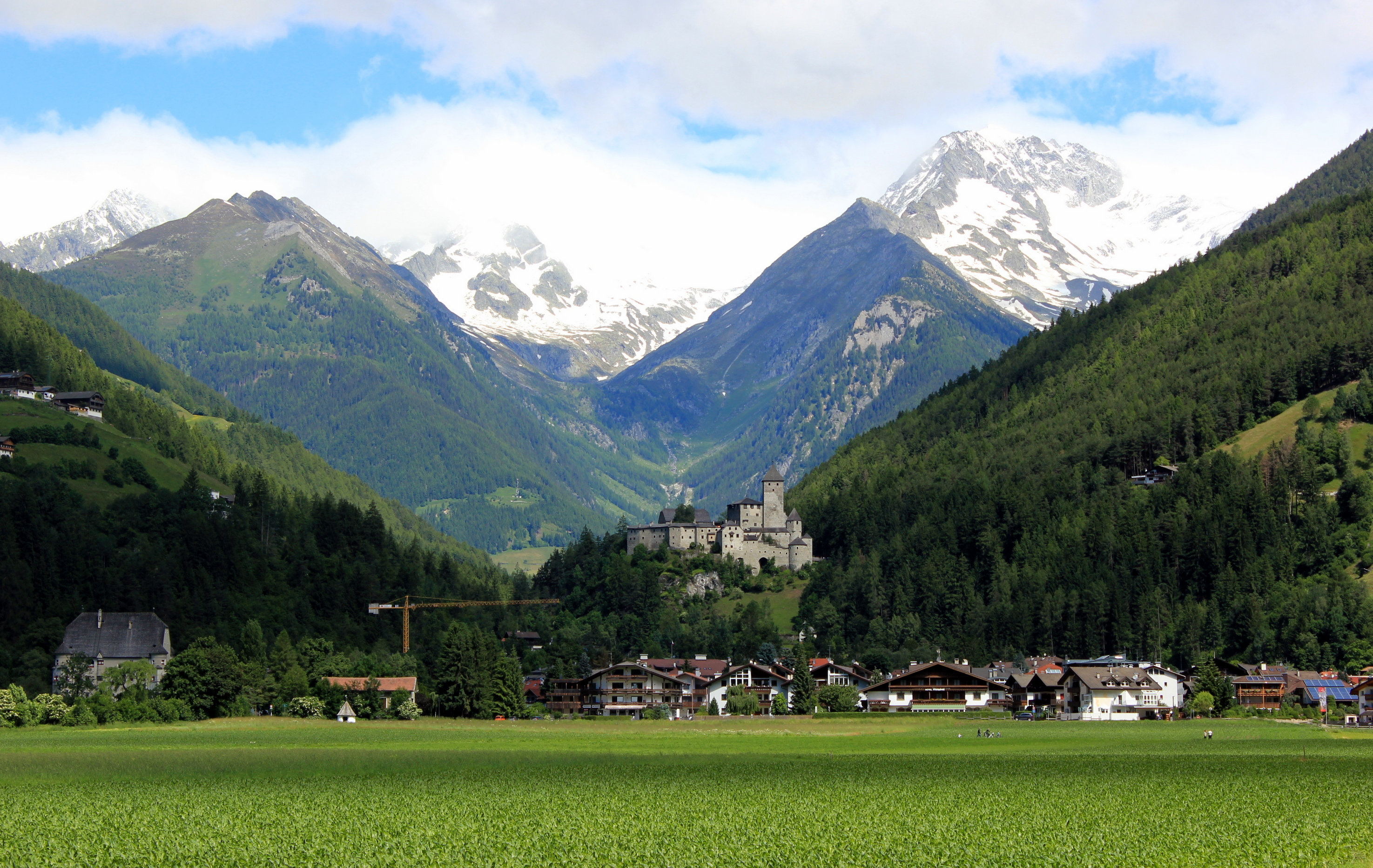
- Town centre with Taufers Castle

- Coat of arms

- Location within Italy Location within Trentino-Alto Adige/Südtirol
- Coordinates: 46°55′16″N 11°57′20″E
- Country: Italy
- Region: Trentino-Alto Adige/Südtirol
- Province: South Tyrol (BZ)
- Frazioni: Ahornach (Acereto di Tures), Kematen (Caminata di Tures), Mühlen in Taufers (Molini di Tures), Rein in Taufers (Riva di Tures)

Government
  - Mayor: Josef Nöckler

Area
  - Total: 164.3 km^{2} (63.4 sq mi)
- Elevation: 864 m (2,835 ft)

Population (Dec. 2015)
  - Total: 5,371
  - Density: 32.69/km^{2} (84.67/sq mi)
- Demonym(s): German: Sandner; Italian: di Campo Tures
- Time zone: UTC+1 (CET)
  - Summer (DST): UTC+2 (CEST)
- Postal code: 39032
- Dialing code: 0474
- Website: Official website

Sand in Taufers (German pronunciation: [sant ʔɪn ˈtaʊfɐs]; Italian: Campo Tures [ˈkampo ˈtuːres]) is a comune mercato (market town) in South Tyrol in northern Italy.

== Geography ==
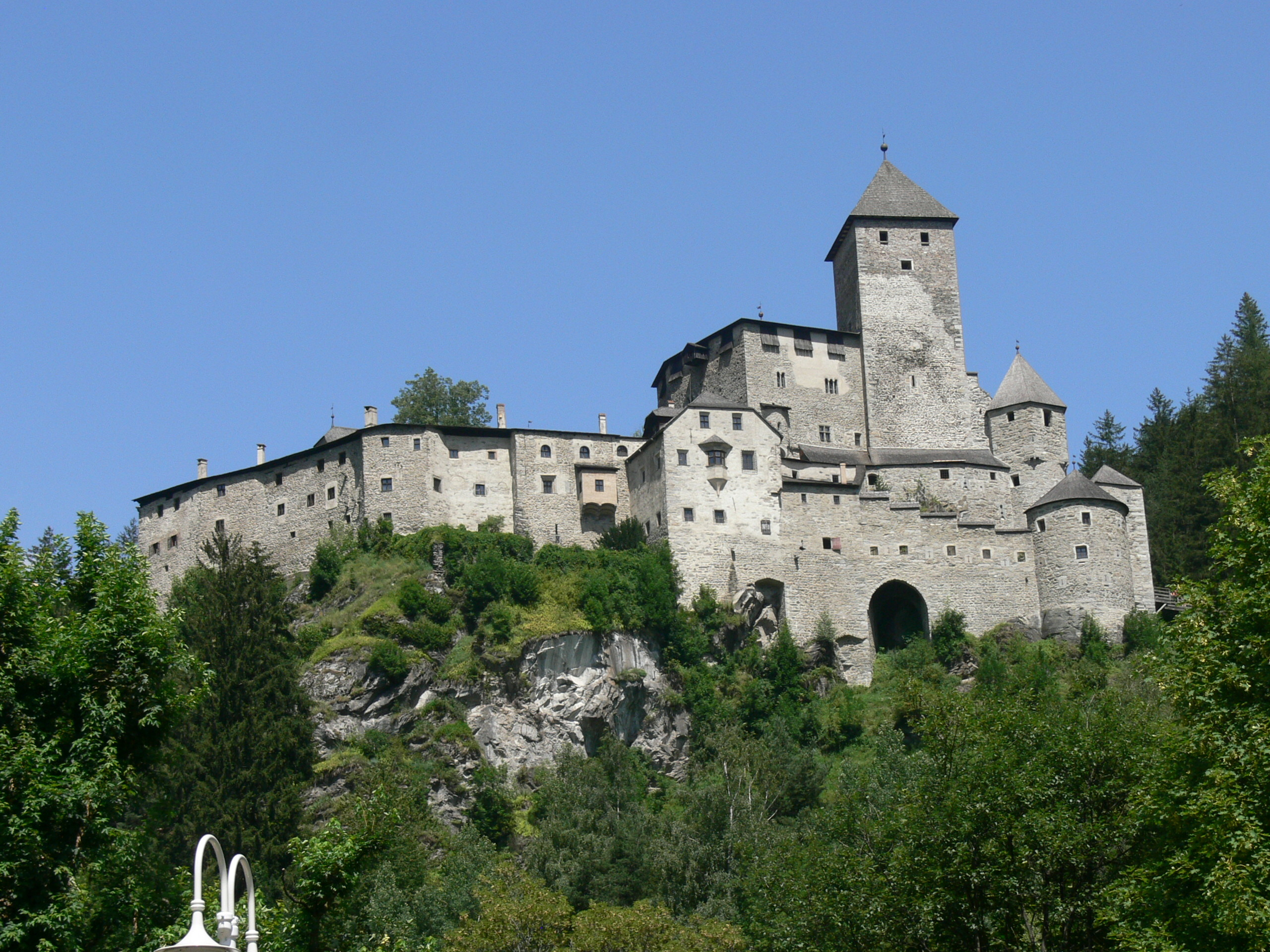
Taufers Castle

Located about 70 kilometres (43 mi) northeast of Bolzano, the town centre is situated in the Tauferer Ahrntal (Taufers) valley of the Ahr river, stretching from Bruneck in Pustertal up northwards to the Venediger Group mountains of the Hohe Tauern range and the border with Austria. The municipal area comprises the frazioni of Ahornach, Kematen, Mühlen in Taufers, and Rein in Taufers. As of 31 December 2015, Sand in Taufers had a population of 5,371 and an area of 164.3 square kilometres (63.4 mi^{2}).

The market town borders the Tauferer Ahrntal municipalities of Gais in the south as well as Ahrntal and Prettau further north. In the east, the municipal area comprises the Reinbach gorge and the slopes of the Rieserferner Group. Large parts are covered by the Rieserferner-Ahrn Nature Park, a protected nature reserve which extends to neighbouring Percha, Rasen-Antholz and Sankt Jakob in Defereggen in Austrian East Tyrol. West of the village of Mühlen, the Mühlwald valley stretches westwards up along the Speikboden massif to the Neves reservoir and the crest of the Zillertal Alps.

The local Taufers Railway connection from Bruneck station to Sand in Taufers, built in 1908, was discontinued in 1957. Today, the region largely depends on tourism.

=== Climate ===
Climate data for Rein in Taufers (1991−2020 normals, extremes 1958−present): 1,562 m (5,125 ft)
Month	Jan	Feb	Mar	Apr	May	Jun	Jul	Aug	Sep	Oct	Nov	Dec	Year
Record high °C (°F)	9.0 (48.2)	15.0 (59.0)	18.0 (64.4)	21.4 (70.5)	29.0 (84.2)	29.3 (84.7)	30.0 (86.0)	31.0 (87.8)	27.0 (80.6)	21.0 (69.8)	19.0 (66.2)	10.0 (50.0)	31.0 (87.8)
Mean daily maximum °C (°F)	−2.4 (27.7)	1.1 (34.0)	5.6 (42.1)	9.1 (48.4)	13.7 (56.7)	18.1 (64.6)	20.3 (68.5)	19.8 (67.6)	15.1 (59.2)	9.7 (49.5)	2.3 (36.1)	−1.7 (28.9)	9.2 (48.6)
Daily mean °C (°F)	−6.4 (20.5)	−4.4 (24.1)	−0.2 (31.6)	3.5 (38.3)	7.8 (46.0)	11.6 (52.9)	13.7 (56.7)	13.4 (56.1)	9.3 (48.7)	4.8 (40.6)	−1.0 (30.2)	−5.1 (22.8)	3.9 (39.0)
Mean daily minimum °C (°F)	−10.3 (13.5)	−9.8 (14.4)	−5.9 (21.4)	−2.0 (28.4)	2.0 (35.6)	5.1 (41.2)	7.0 (44.6)	6.9 (44.4)	3.5 (38.3)	0.0 (32.0)	−4.3 (24.3)	−8.5 (16.7)	−1.4 (29.6)
Record low °C (°F)	−24.0 (−11.2)	−24.3 (−11.7)	−25.5 (−13.9)	−15.5 (4.1)	−10.0 (14.0)	−10.0 (14.0)	0.0 (32.0)	−2.0 (28.4)	−7.0 (19.4)	−13.2 (8.2)	−18.0 (−0.4)	−24.0 (−11.2)	−25.5 (−13.9)
Average precipitation mm (inches)	43.3 (1.70)	29.9 (1.18)	46.6 (1.83)	58.0 (2.28)	94.3 (3.71)	130.0 (5.12)	134.9 (5.31)	134.0 (5.28)	93.7 (3.69)	90.3 (3.56)	76.0 (2.99)	52.4 (2.06)	983.4 (38.71)
Average precipitation days (≥ 1.0 mm)	7.5	6.3	7.6	8.4	13.1	14.3	14.0	13.6	10.0	9.9	9.0	8.0	121.7
Source: Landeswetterdienst Südtirol

== Taufers Castle ==
The settlement of Tvfres was first mentioned in the mid 11th century in the registers of the Prince-bishops of Brixen. The Tyrolean lordship was ruled from Taufers Castle, a huge medieval fortress which towers on a rock above the village and was built from the early 13th century onwards. Restored in the 20th century, the preserved castle complex is a popular film location, providing the setting of the 1998 drama film The Red Violin, the 2003 comedy Just Married and the 2016 comedy Burg Schreckenstein. It also served as a picturesque backdrop for Roman Polanski's 1967 horror classic The Fearless Vampire Killers.

== Demography ==
=== Linguistic distribution ===
According to the 2024 census, 96.02% of the population speak German, 3.63% Italian and 0.35% Ladin as first language.

=== Demographic evolution ===
Historical population

Year	Pop.	±%
1860	?	—
1870	?	—
1880	2,384	—
1900	?	—
1910	2,387	—

Year	Pop.	±%
1921	2,627	+10.1%
1931	2,673	+1.8%
1936	2,932	+9.7%
1951	3,276	+11.7%
1961	3,426	+4.6%

Year	Pop.	±%
1971	3,780	+10.3%
1981	4,247	+12.4%
1991	4,436	+4.5%
2001	4,880	+10.0%

Source: Data from ISTAT

== Coat-of-arms ==
The arms is barry of six gules and argent. The first two of argent have three lozenge of azure, the third has two. The emblem was of the Lords of Taufers that became extinct in 1300. The emblem was adopted in 1967.

== Social housing ==
In 1974, due to provincial autonomy policy, Sand in Taufers has become in the Daimerstraße road the first postwar site of a social housing project in South Tyrol.

== Notable people ==
- Emil von Ottenthal (1855–1931) historian and archivist
- Josef Andreas Jungmann (1889–1975) a prominent Jesuit priest and liturgist
- Erich Kirchler (born 1954) Professor of Economic Psychology at the University of Vienna, researches tax psychology
- Hans Kammerlander (born 1956), mountaineer
- Barbara Ertl (born 1982) biathlete, competed at the 2006 Winter Olympics, she lives in Sand in Taufers
