= Molini =

Molini may refer to:

== Places ==
Croatia

- Molini Franceschi (or Zmijavci), contrada in the municipality of the Split-Dalmatia County in Croatia

Italy

- Molini, fraction of the municipality of Fraconalto in the Province of Alessandria
- Molini di Colognola, municipality of Casazza in the Province of Bergamo
- Selva dei Molini, comune (municipality) in South Tyrol
- Molini de Tures, village in the municipality of Sand in Taufers in South Tyrol
- Molini di Triora, comune (municipality) in the Province of Imperia

== See also ==
- Mola (disambiguation)
- Molina (disambiguation)
- Molino (disambiguation)
- Molyneux (disambiguation)
