= Speikboden (South Tyrol) =

Mountain in Italy

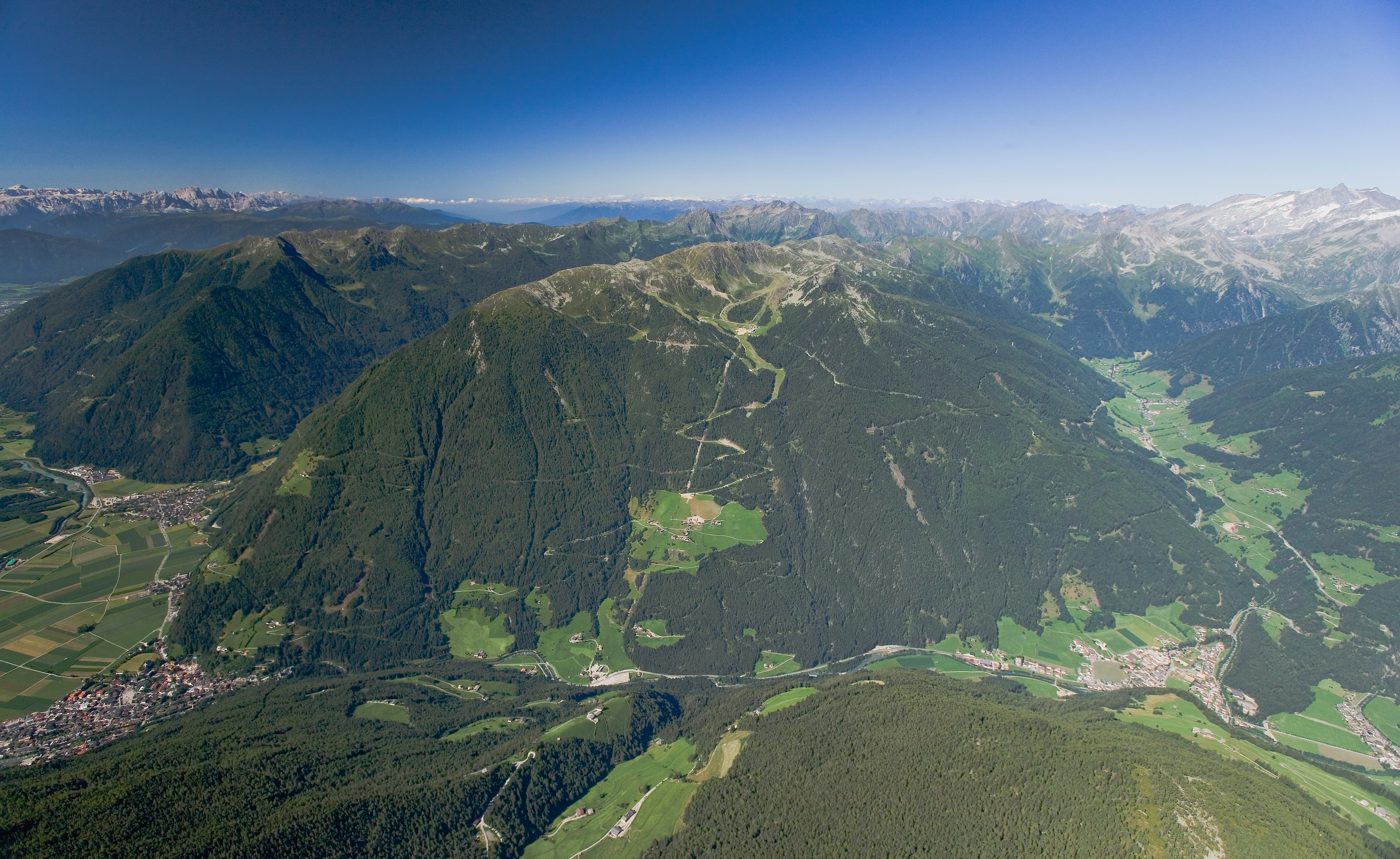
- Speikboden as seen from the north-east: On the right at the foot of the mountain the village of Luttach, behind it the Weißenbach valley (Ahrntal); on the left at the foot of the mountain the village of Sand in Taufers, behind it Mühlen in Taufers and the Mühlwald valley

Highest point
- Elevation: 2,517 m (8,258 ft)
- Coordinates: 46°55′8″N 11°53′11″E

Geography
- Location within Alps
- Location: South Tyrol, Italy
- Parent range: Zillertal Alps

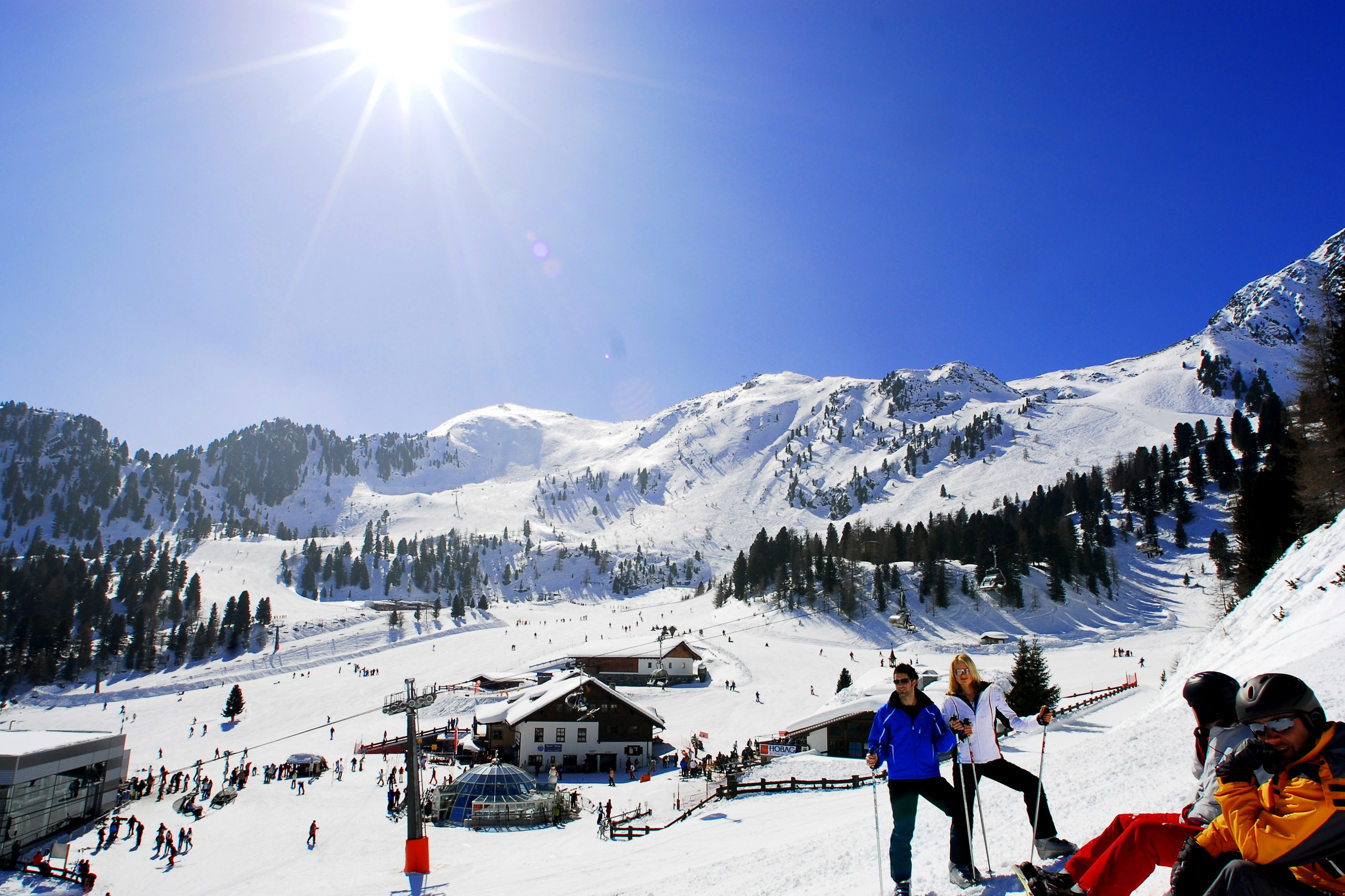
Speikboden Alm

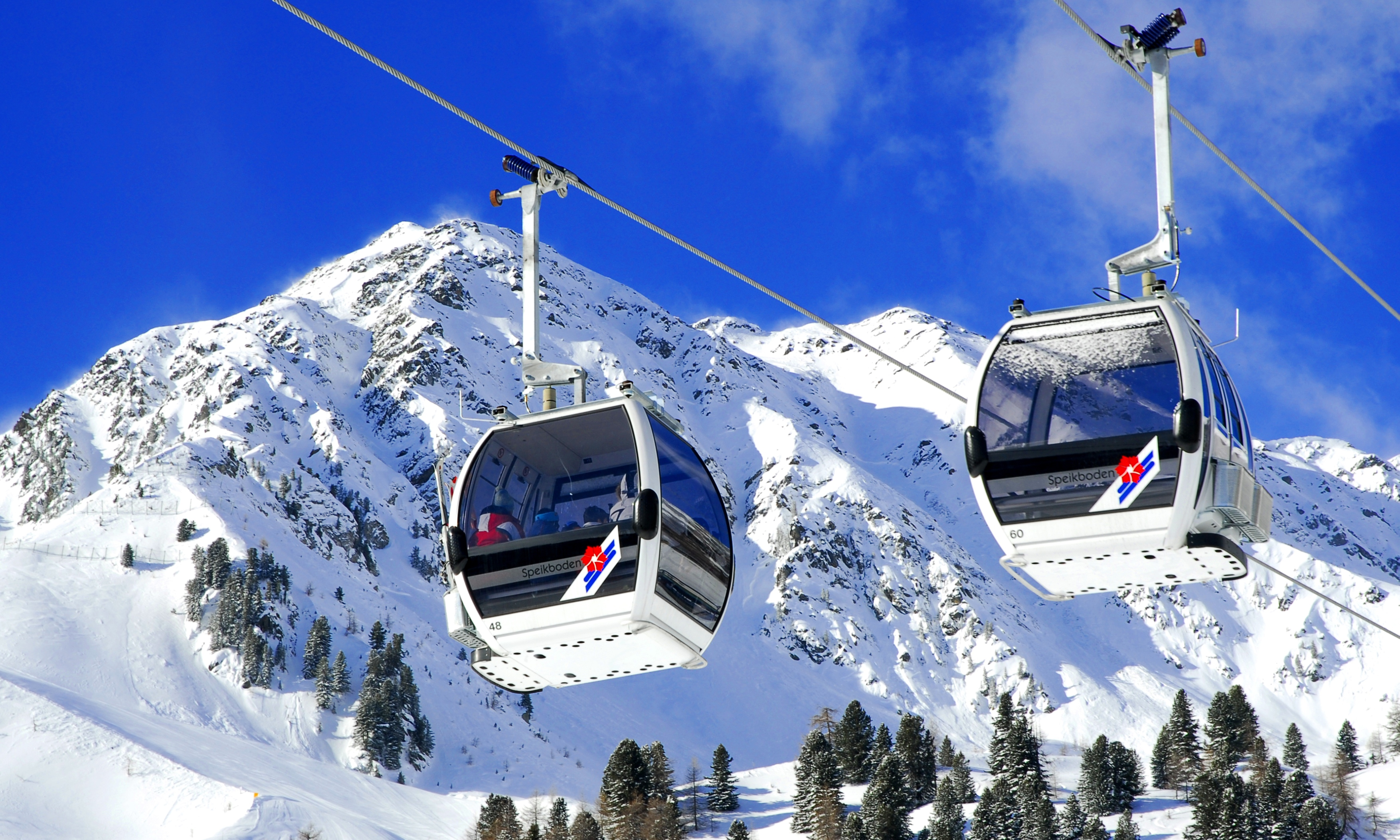
Gondola lift Speikboden

Speikboden is a massif in the Central Eastern Alps located between the three valleys Weißenbach, Mühlwald and Ahrntal. Running in a south-easterly direction, it forms the eastern part of an outlier of the western Zillertal Alps. Its highest point, likewise named Speikboden, is 2,517 m. Further well-known peaks in this massif include Seewassernock (2,516 m), Große Nock (2,400 m), Kleine Nock (2,227 m) and Gornerberg (2,475 m).

Villages in the valley include Lappach, Luttach, Mühlwald, Sand in Taufers, St. Johann and Weißenbach.

== Skiing and hiking area ==
The Speikboden massif is home to an extensive ski area of the same name with downhill runs leading all the way to Drittelsand at the far end of the Ahrntal valley. Created in the early 1970s by local investors with the support of Bavarian Bernhard Glück, the ski area, which was extended several times over, was originally called Michlreis-Speikboden, Michlreis being the name of the lower part of the ski resort.

The ski area is made up of two zones, the first being the full-length valley run. It is a red-graded (moderate) slope, named Michl. The slope starts at the mountain station of the gondola lift Speikboden and goes along Michlreis down into the valley (Drittelsand). The entire valley run from top to bottom is 7 kilometers long.

The upper section, a basin known as the Speikboden Alm, has four red-graded slopes, two blue pistes, and three black pistes, which can be reached using detachable chairlifts and gondola lifts. This section contains a compact network of groomed slopes and totals 40 kilometres of pistes. A nursery slope with two magic carpet conveyor belts is located next to the bottom station.

The lift facilities are open during the summer months too. Speikboden has a vast network of well-maintained hiking trails as well as two via ferratas (difficulty levels B/C and A).

=== Lifts ===
Type	Name	Capacity	Length	Altitude gain
Gondola	Speikboden	2400 P/h	2900 m	1008 m
Detachable chairlift	Seenock	2400 P/h	1200 m	300 m
Detachable chairlift	Bernhard Glück	1640 P/h	1200 m	360 m
Detachable chairlift	Sonnklar	1500 P/h	900 m	400 m
Gondola	Alm-Express	2400 P/h	660 m	150 m
Conveyor belt	Tottomandl	1000 P/h	220 m	40 m
Conveyor belt	Family Funpark Toni	1000 P/h	120 m	21 m
Conveyor belt	Family Funpark Leni	1000 P/h	72 m	12 m

=== Snowpark ===
Located at the edge of the Seenock piste is a 400-meter-long snowpark with jumps and rails covering all levels of difficulty.

=== Toboggan runs ===
There are two toboggan runs starting from the top station of the Speikboden gondola. One leads down to Weißenbach, the other to Luttach where a free ski-bus is available to take tobogganers back to the Speikboden bottom station.

=== Paragliding and hang-gliding ===
Speikboden has become world-renowned among cross-country paragliders thanks to Kurt Eder. Although he seldom leaves his home region, the South Tyrolean is a "regular" on the winners’ podium at international XC paragliding championships. Speikboden offers a XC destination for newcomers to the sport and experienced pilots alike. Flying is possible all year round but the months between June and September offer the optimal conditions. The panoramas from the launching sites are vast; on the south side you can see all the way to the Central Dolomites. Speikboden is located directly to the south of the Zillertal Alpine Divide which means it is poorly shielded from the wind from the north and flying is not recommended if this wind is too strong. The towering Durreck range behind Speikboden does, however, protect the launching areas from moderate north-winds.

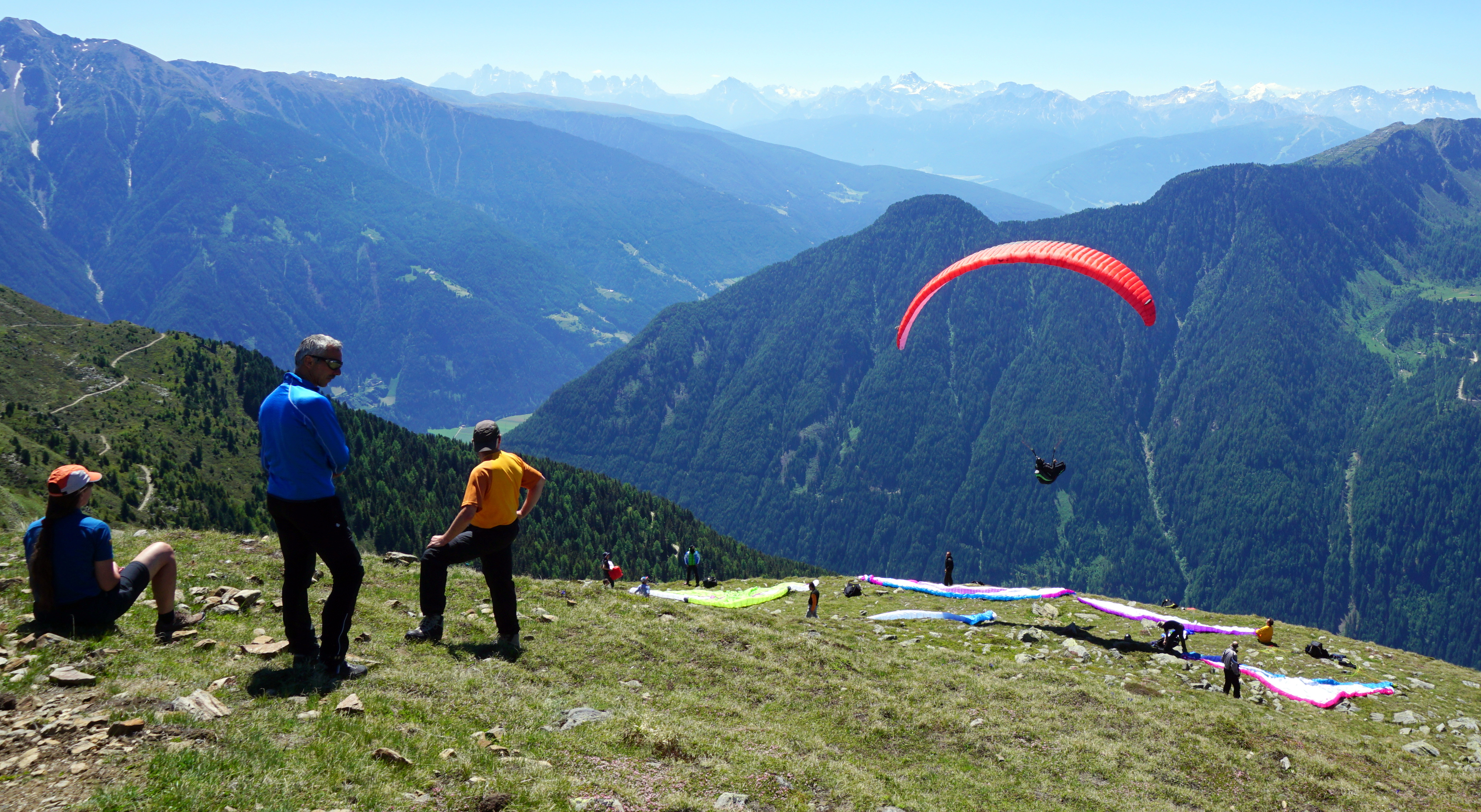
Launching site for paragliders on the Speikboden

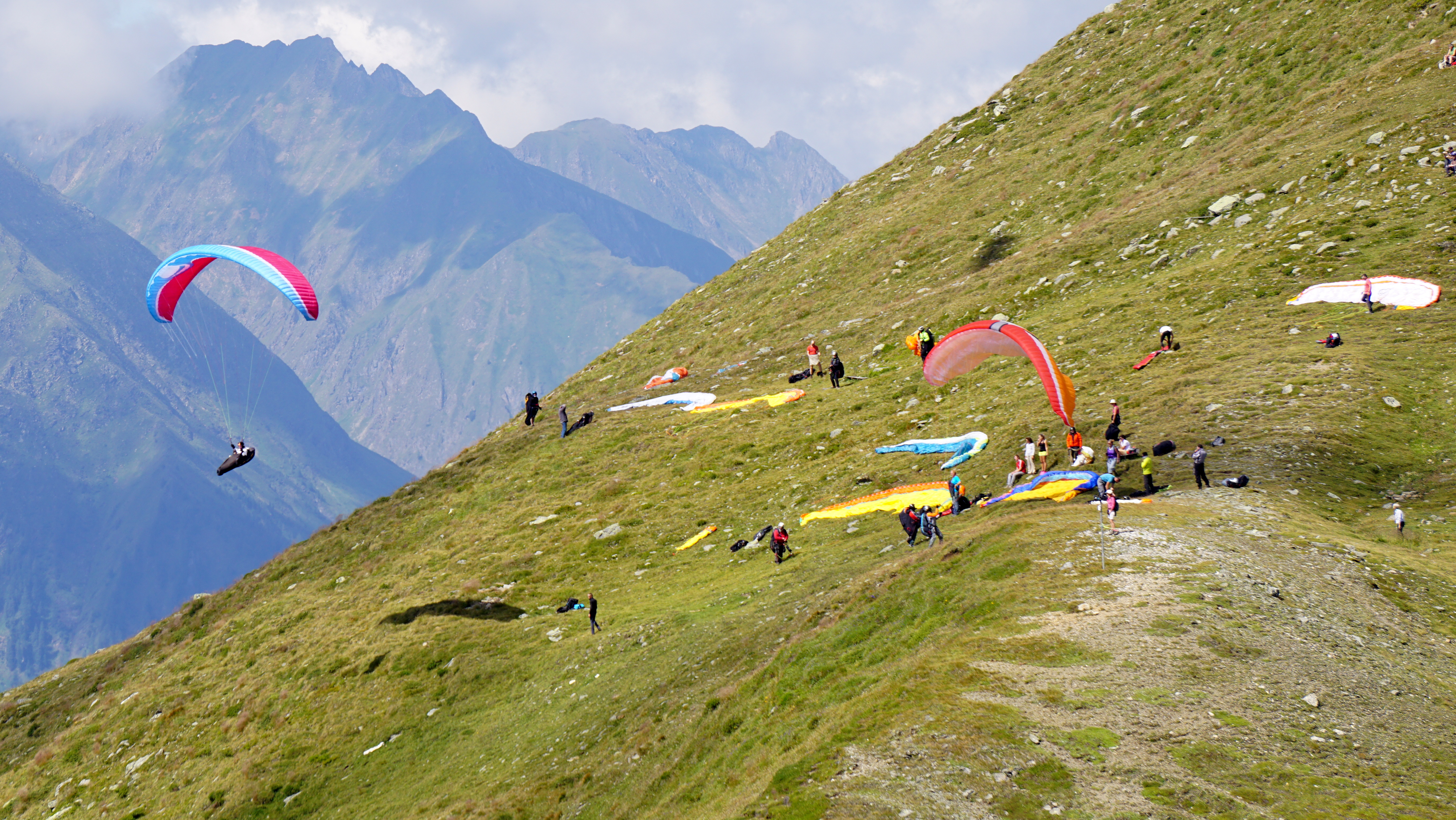
Launching site for paragliders on the Speikboden

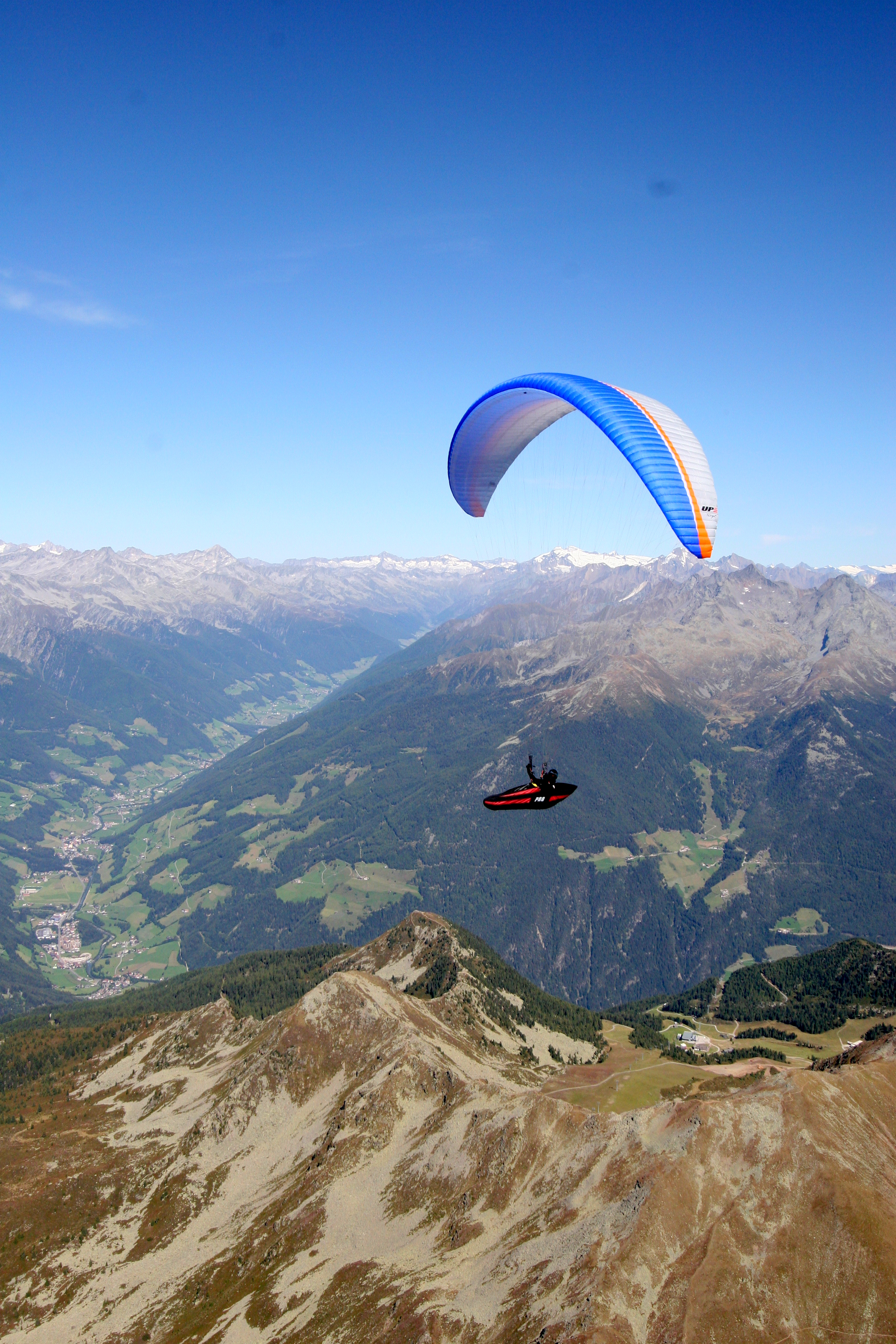
Paragliding in the Speikboden region

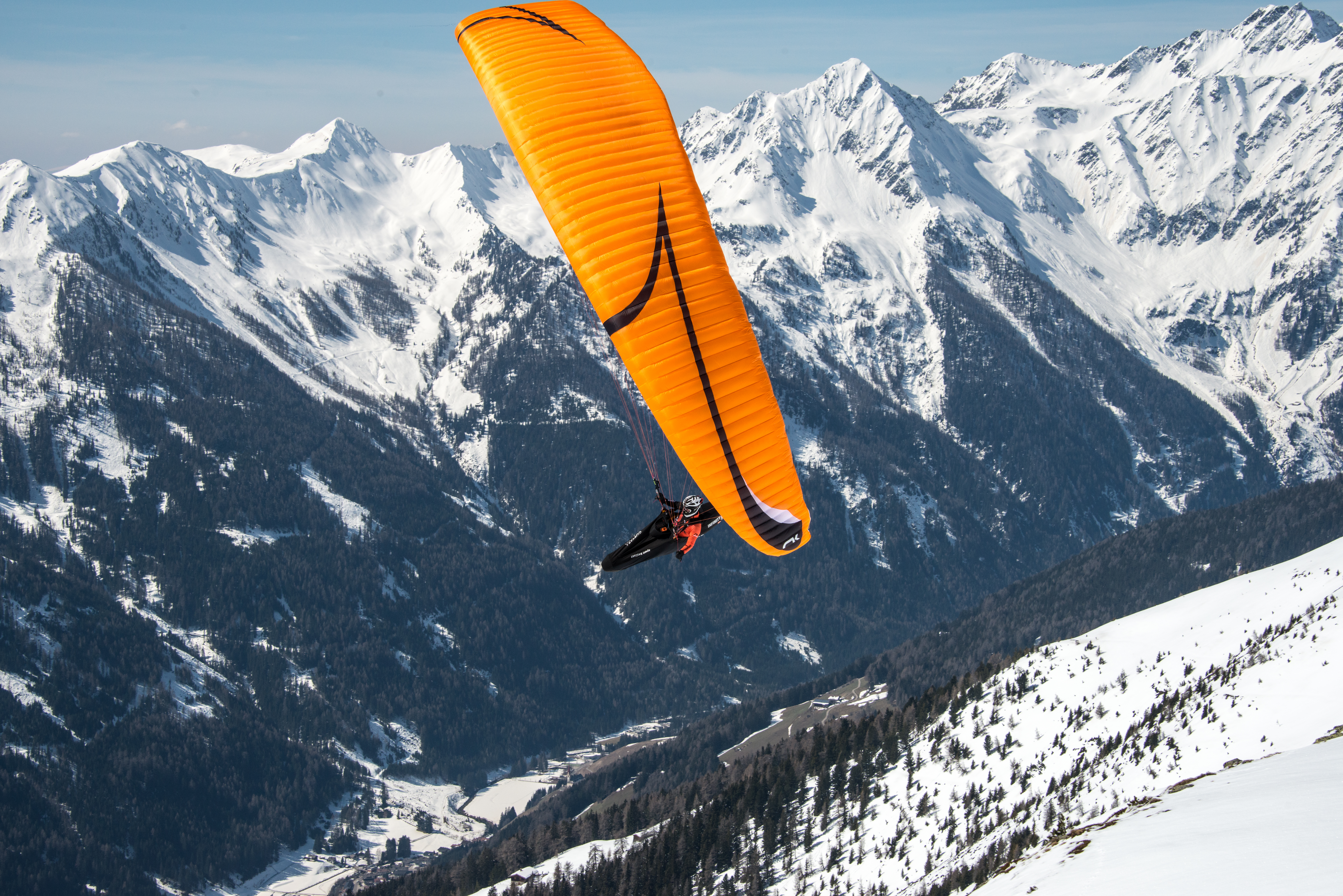
Paragliding in the Speikboden region

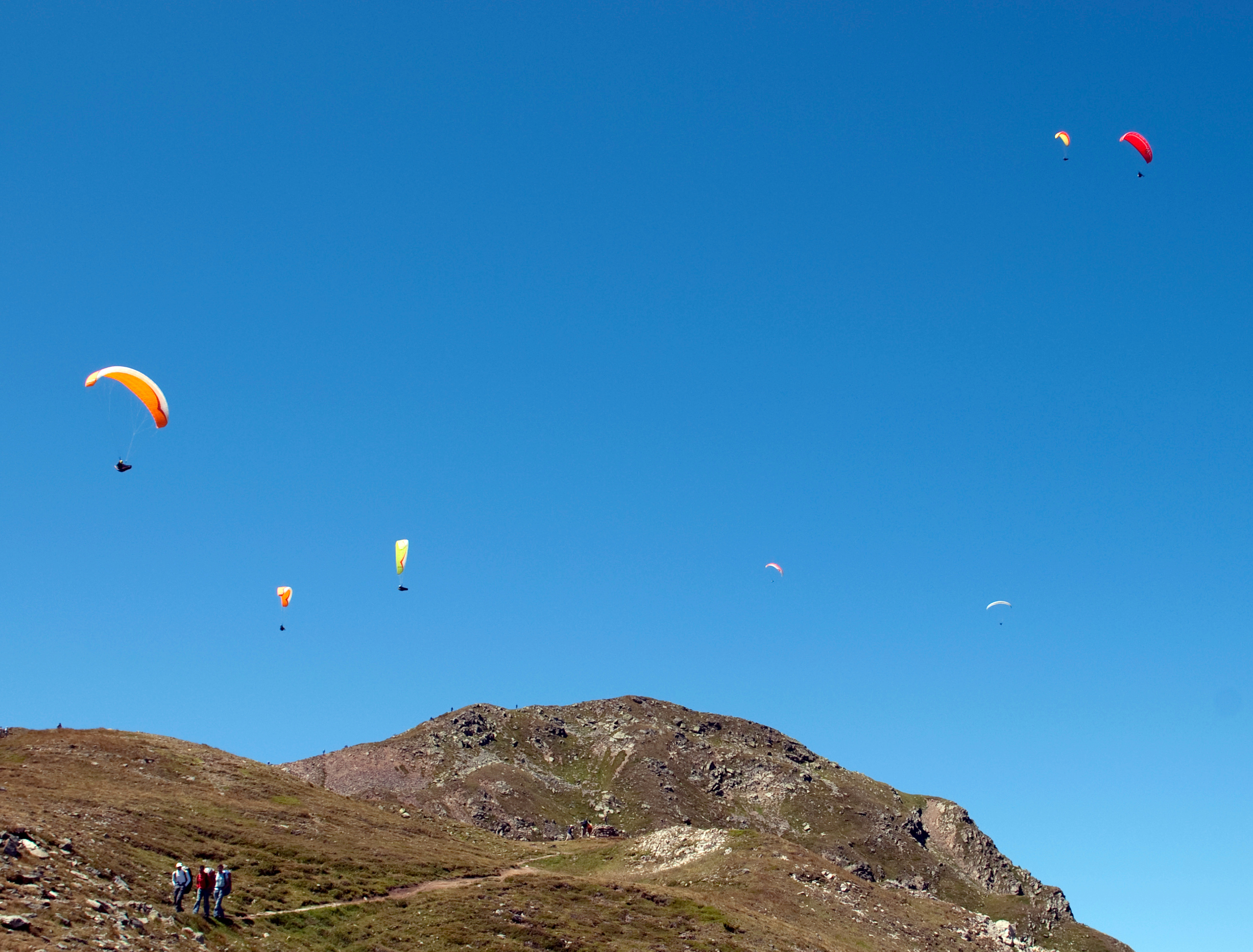
Paragliding in the Speikboden region

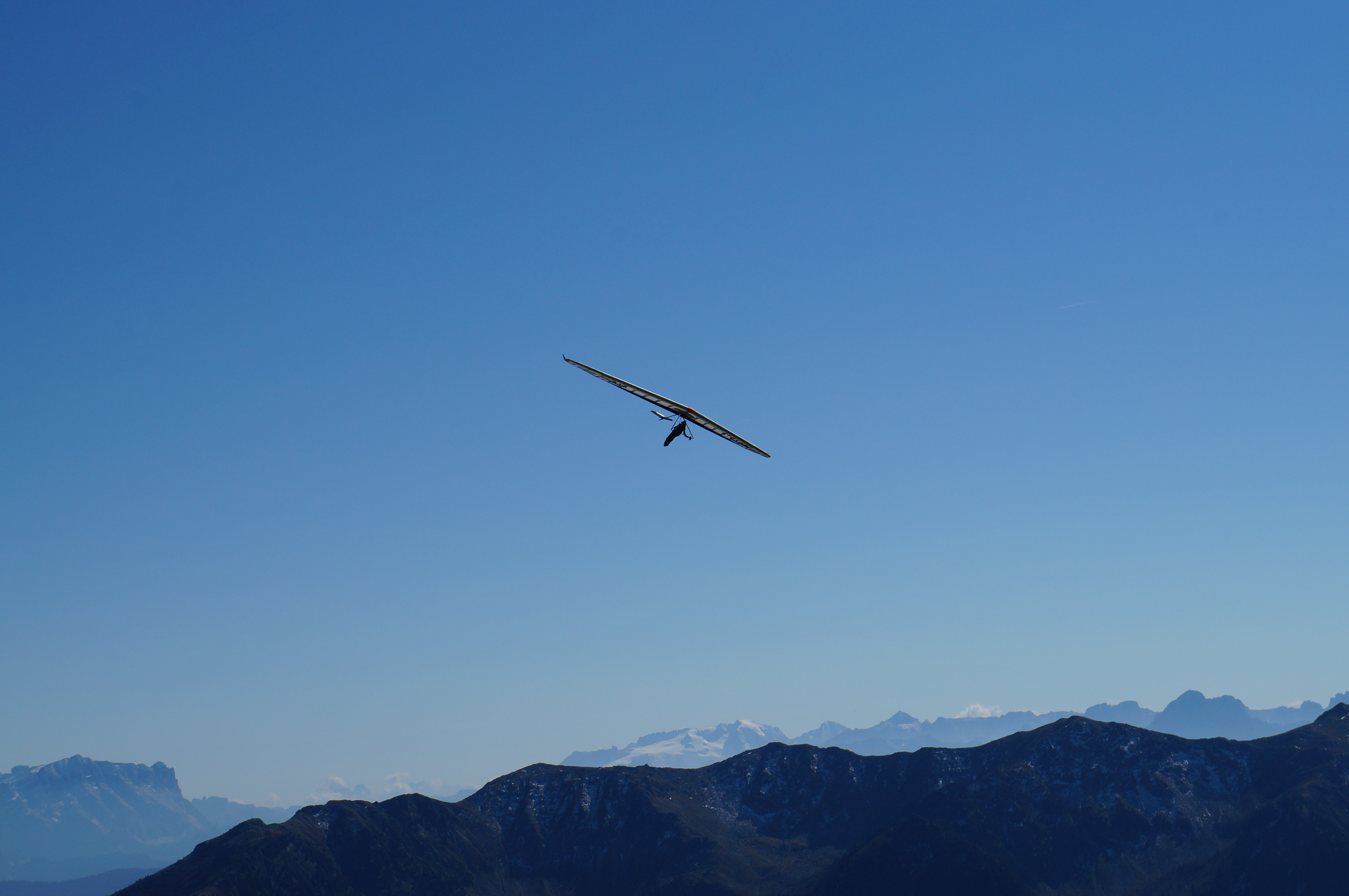
Hang-gliding in the Speikboden region

=== Hiking ===
The development of Speikboden as a hiking area began as far back as the 1870s. Founded by Josef Daimer in 1873, the Sand in Taufers section of the German and Austrian Alpine Club constructed the Sonklarhütte refuge and, leading up to the hut, the "Herrenweg" track which was renamed "Daimerweg" in 1903 in honour of Josef Daimer. The construction of the Chemnitzer Hütte mountain hut by the Alpine Club Chemnitz section in 1895 can also be credited to the initiative and untiring efforts of Josef Daimler. The high-altitude trail "Kellerbauerweg" was created in 1906 with the purpose of connecting the two mountain shelters Sonklarhütte and Chemnitzer Hütte.

In the 1990s efforts were rekindled to improve and expand the network of hiking trails centred around the Daimerweg and Kellerbauerweg trails - a process that is still on-going today. The Speikboden massif now boasts 90 kilometres of hiking tracks. The maintenance and further extension of this network are carried out by the employees of the lift company.

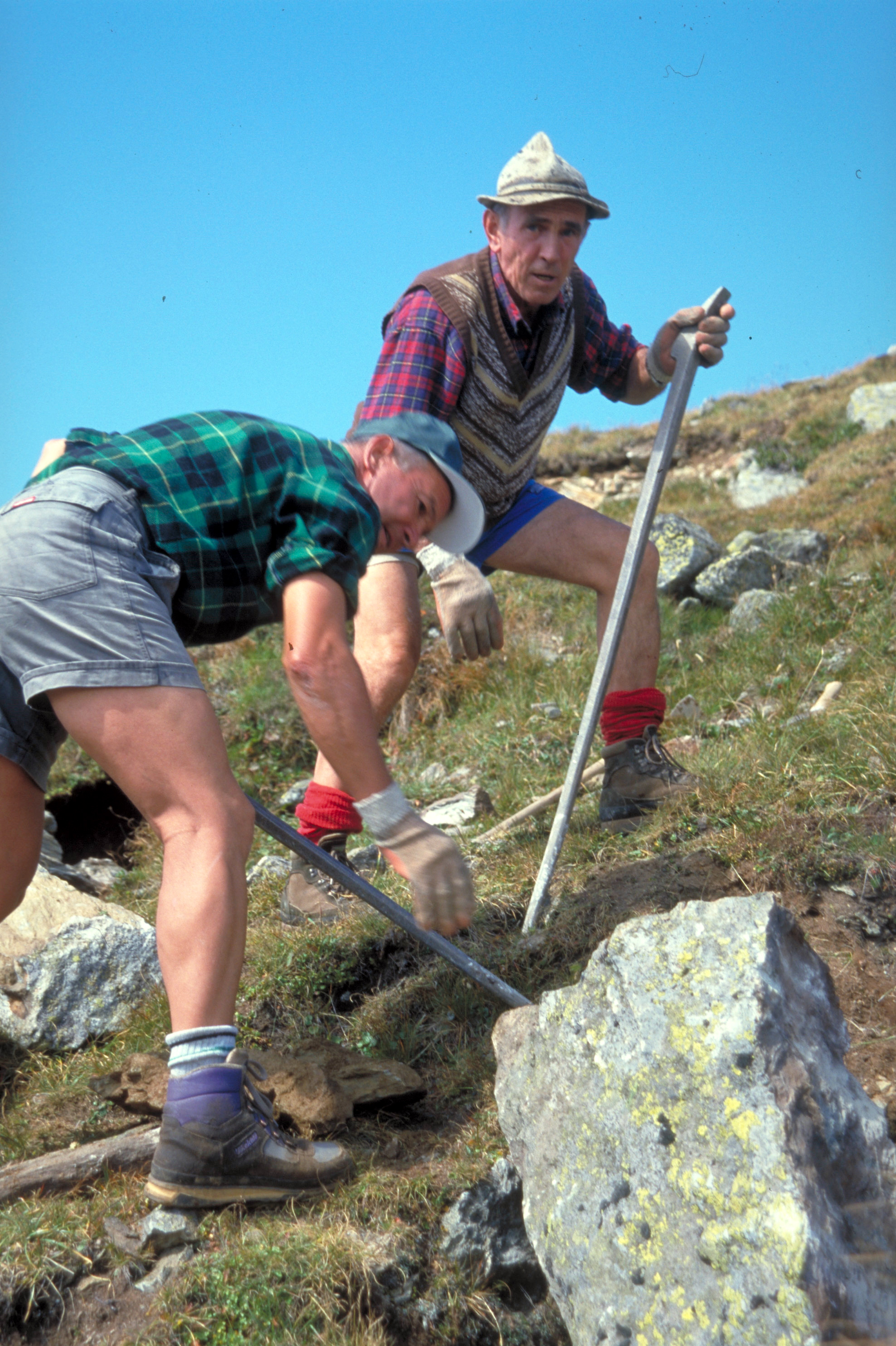
Trail construction on the Speikboden at the end of the 1990s and in the early 2000s

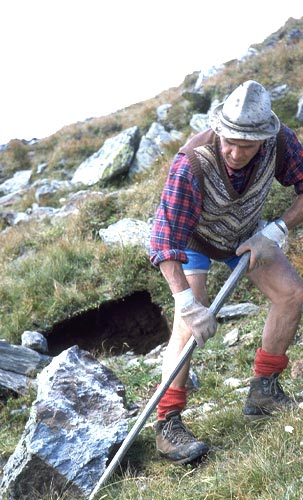
Trail construction on the Speikboden at the end of the 1990s and in the early 2000s

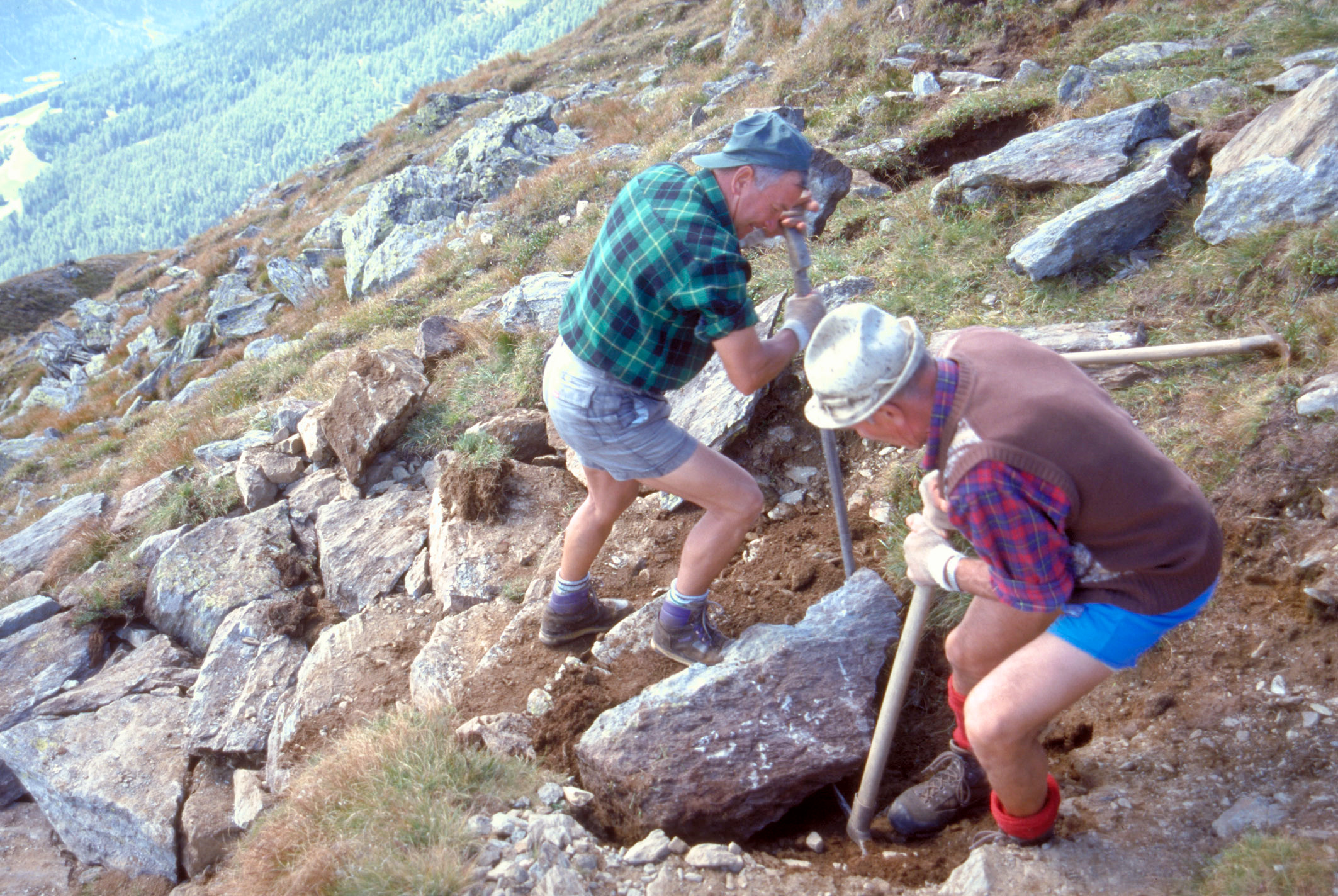
Trail construction on the Speikboden at the end of the 1990s and in the early 2000s

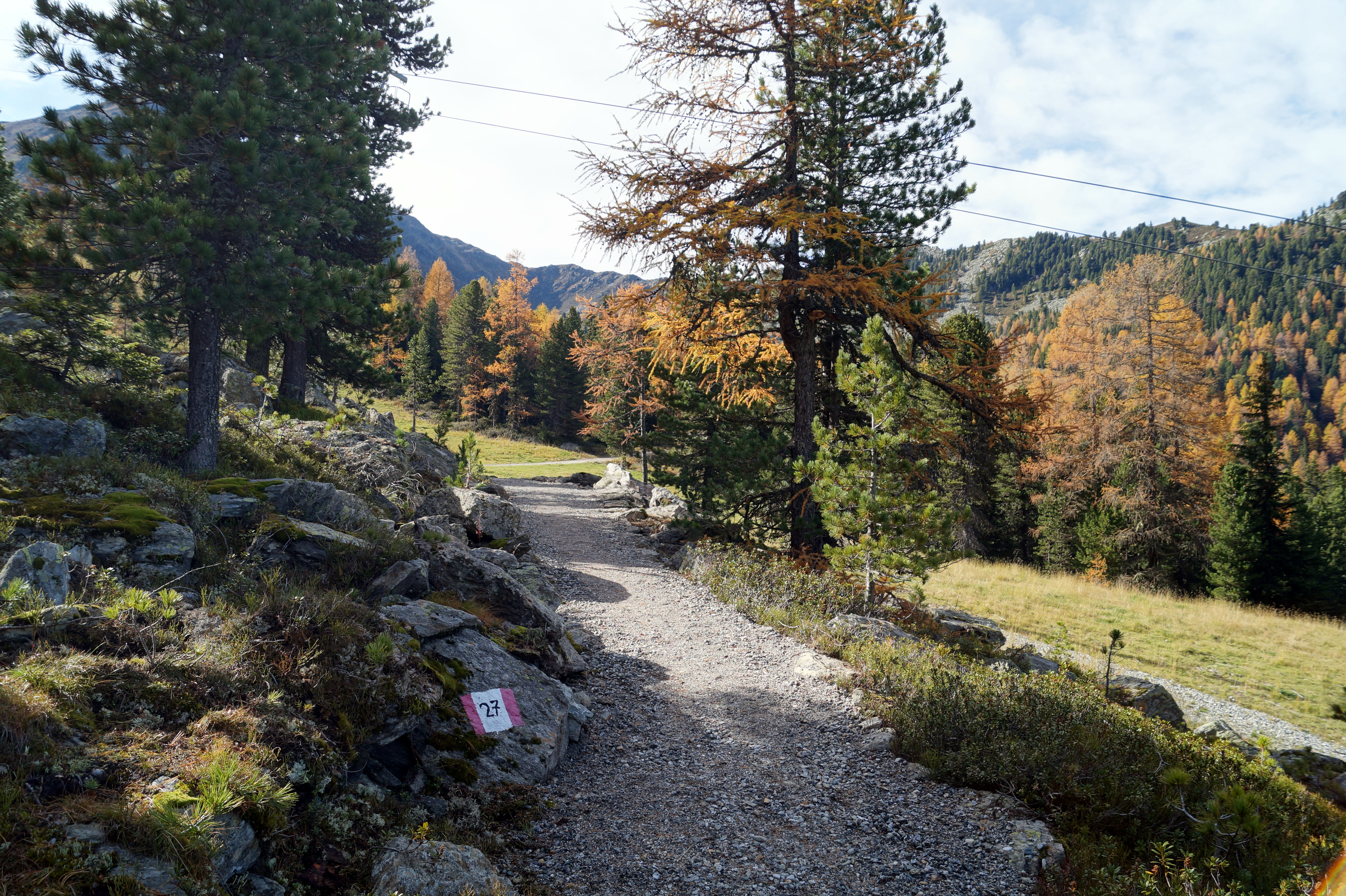
Hiking trails on the Speikboden

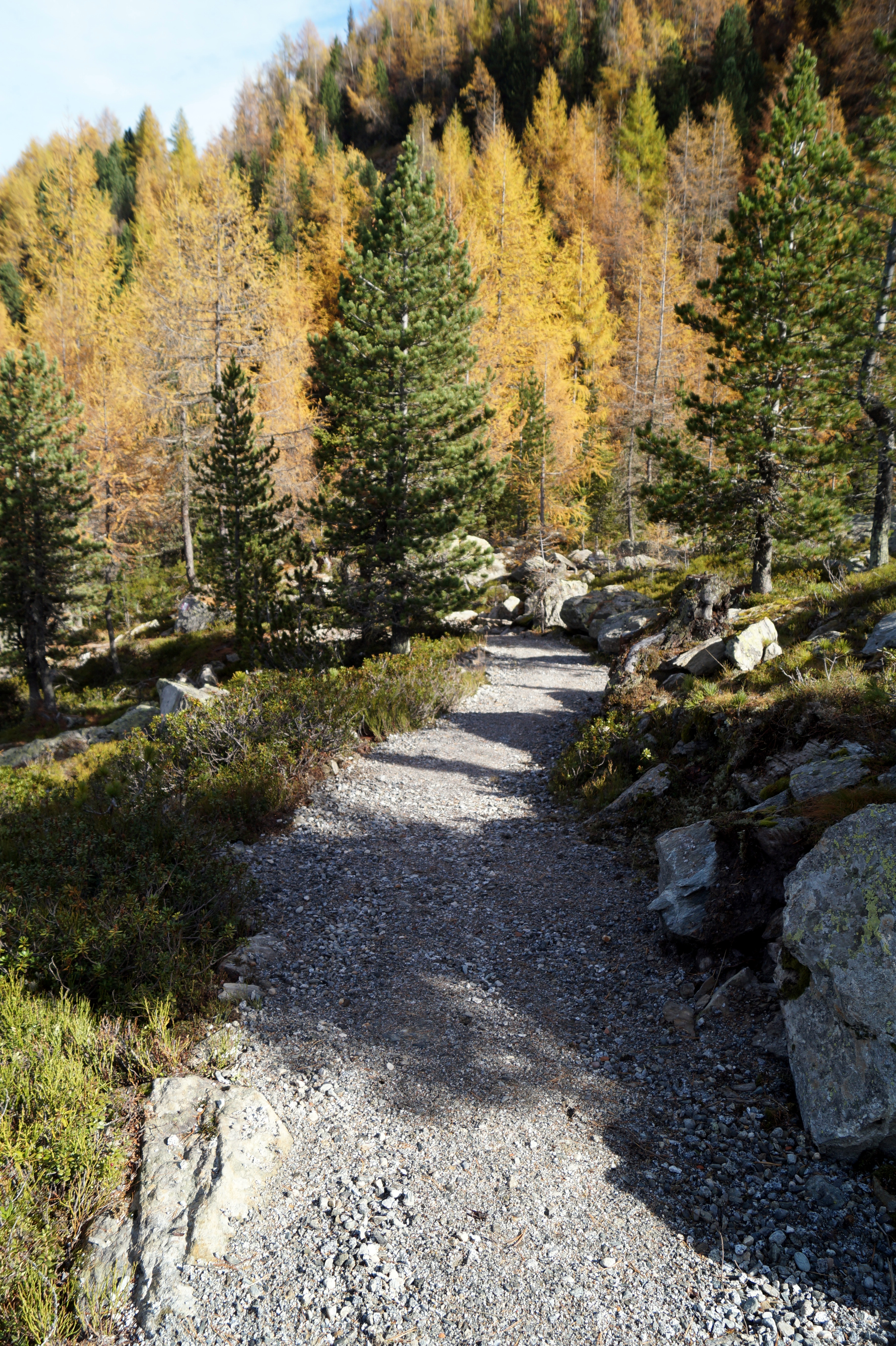
Hiking trails on the Speikboden

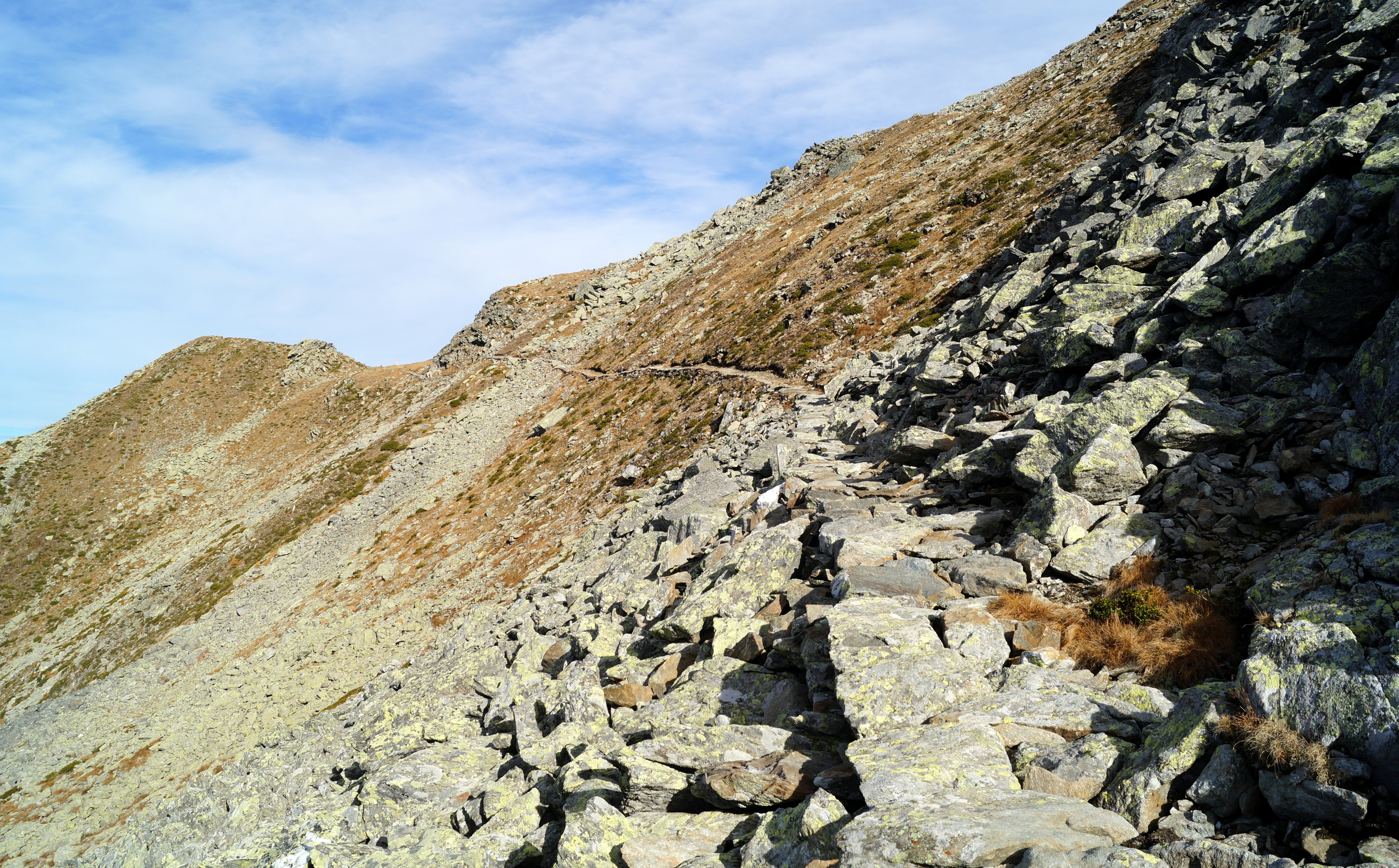
Hiking trails on the Speikboden

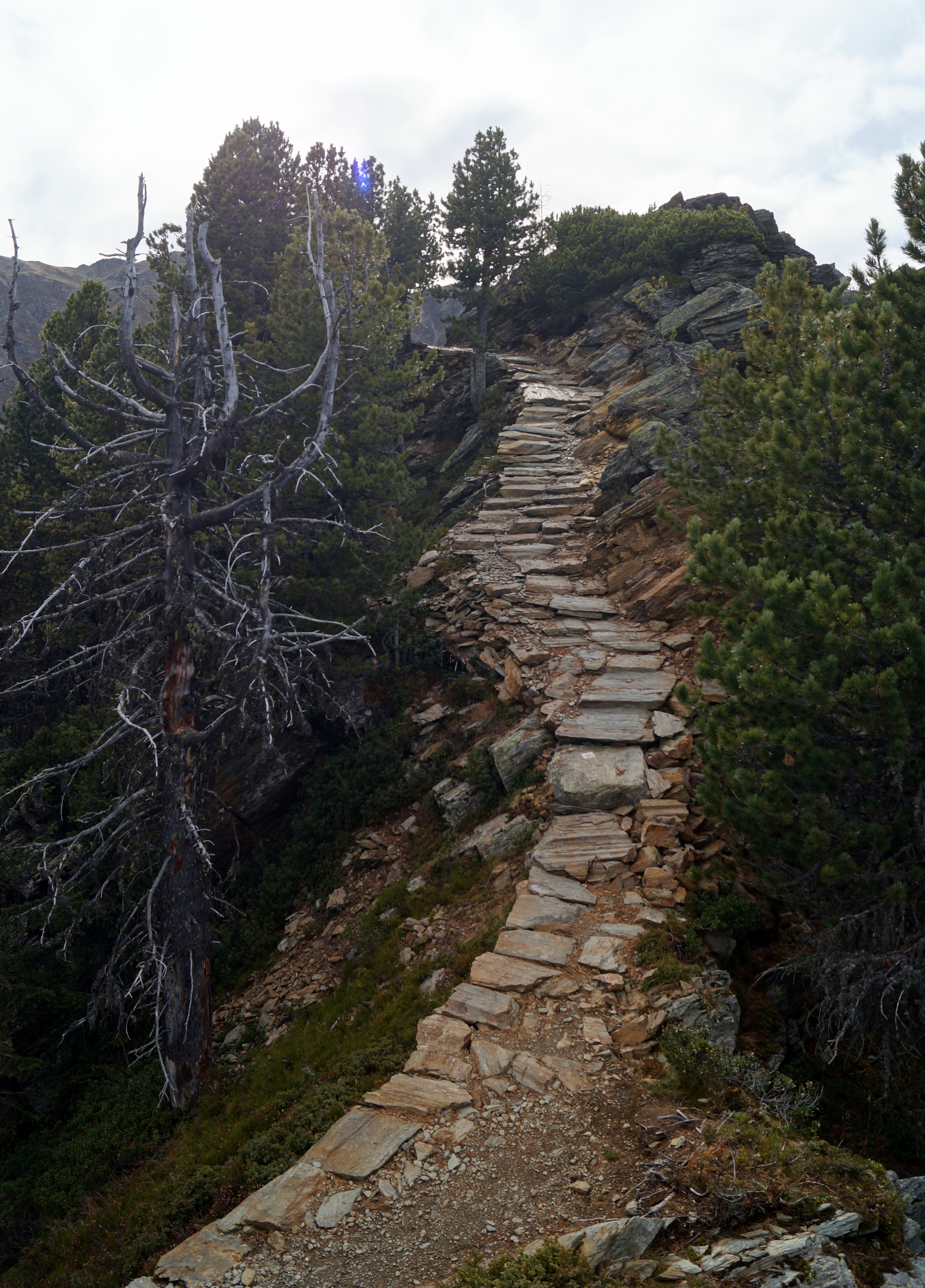
Hiking trails on the Speikboden

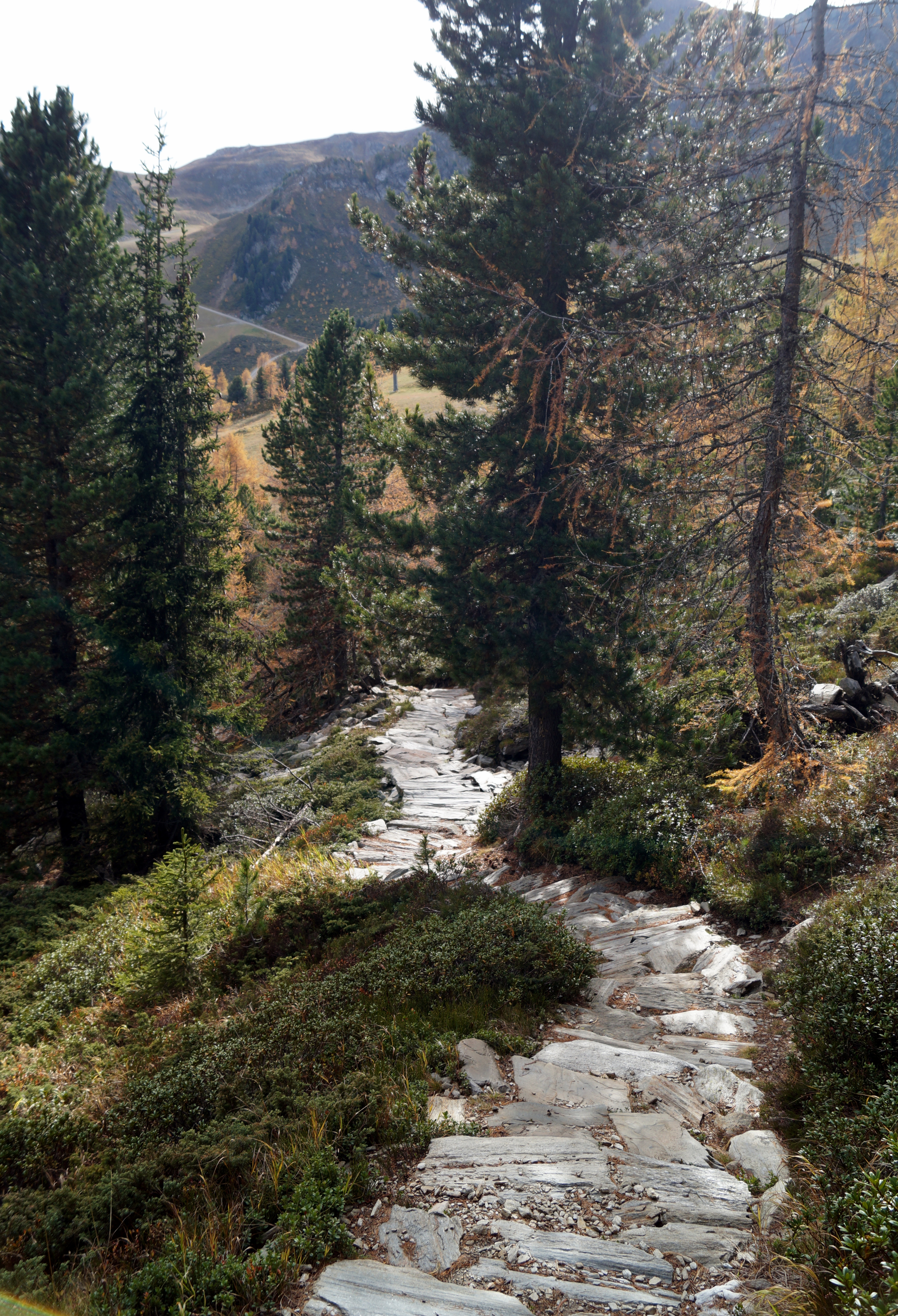
Hiking trails on the Speikboden

Sonklarhütte

Located to the south of the summit at an altitude of 2,420 m, the Sonklarhütte refuge was originally constructed back in 1876 by the former Sand in Taufers section of the German and Austrian Alpine Club and was named after Carl Sonklar. The hut was built in the space of just a few weeks and was one of the first of its kind in South Tyrol. Initially offering overnight accommodation for just 10 people it quickly proved too small and a new, larger hut was built in 1899. During the First World War the hut remained unmanaged and fell into disrepair after the end of the war. In 1926 the new owner, the Bruneck section of the Italian Alpine Club "CAI", made plans to restore the mountain refuge. This, however, never took place.

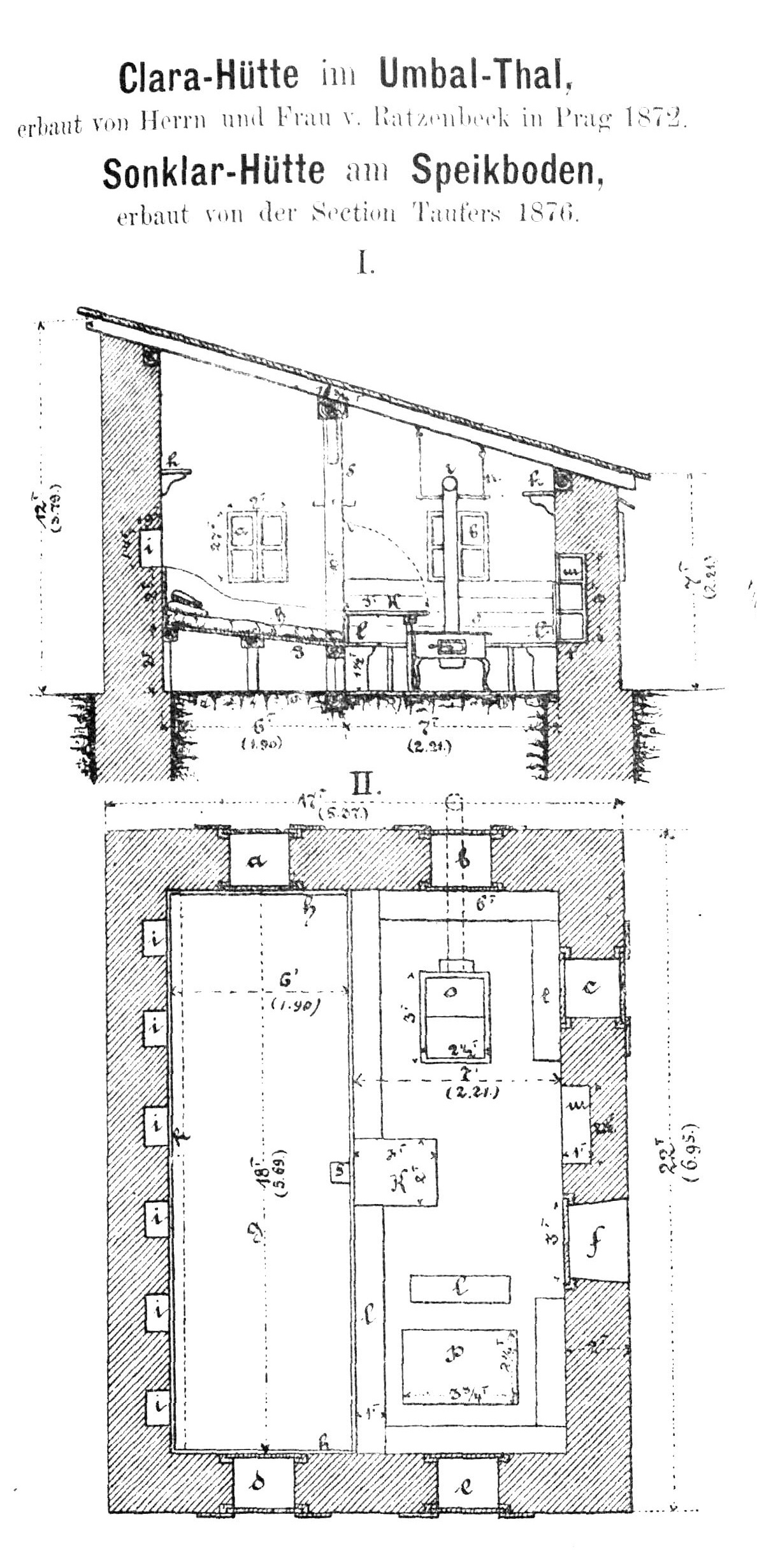
Draft of the Sonklarhütte drawn by Johann Stüdl

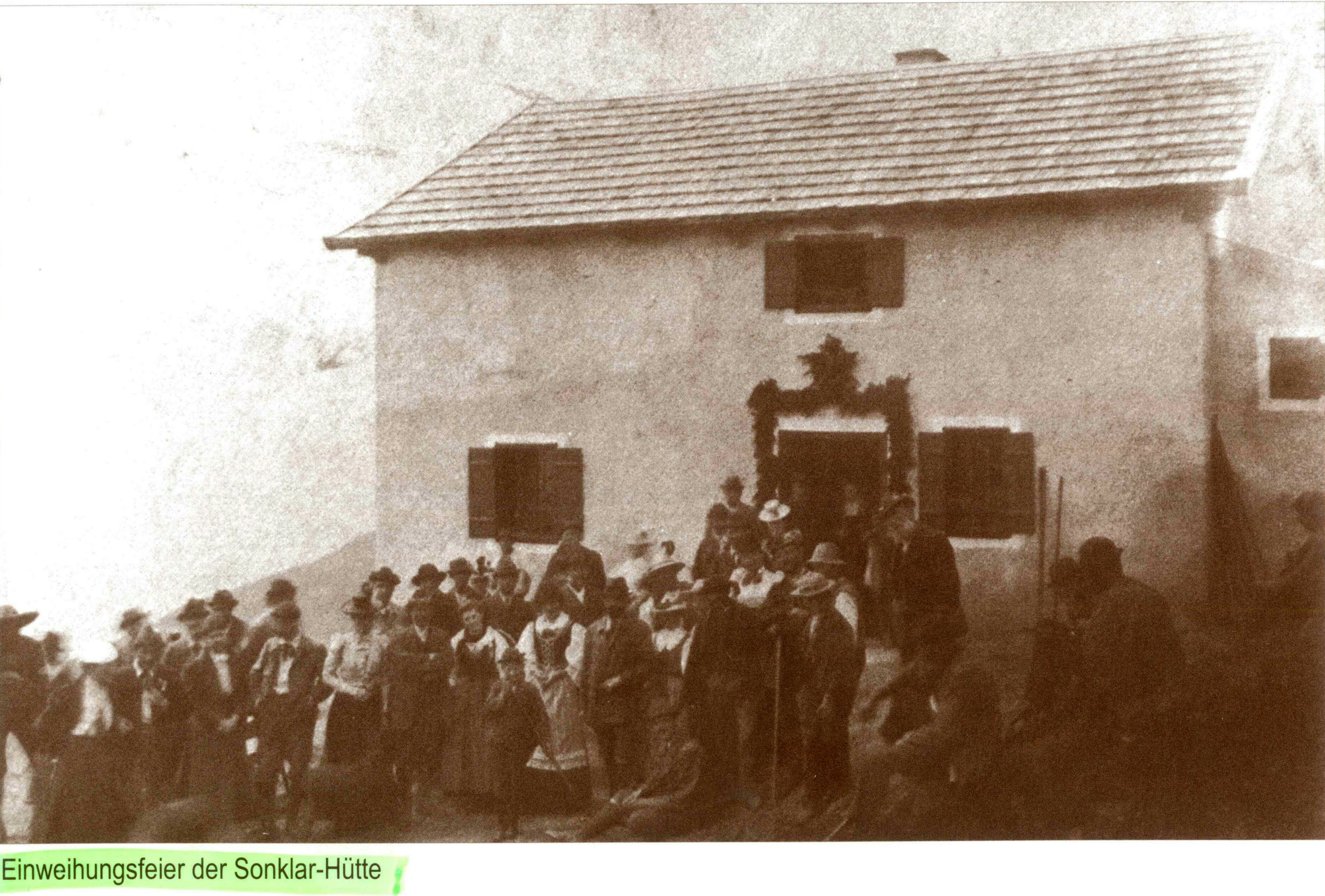
Report on the inauguration of the Sonklarhütte

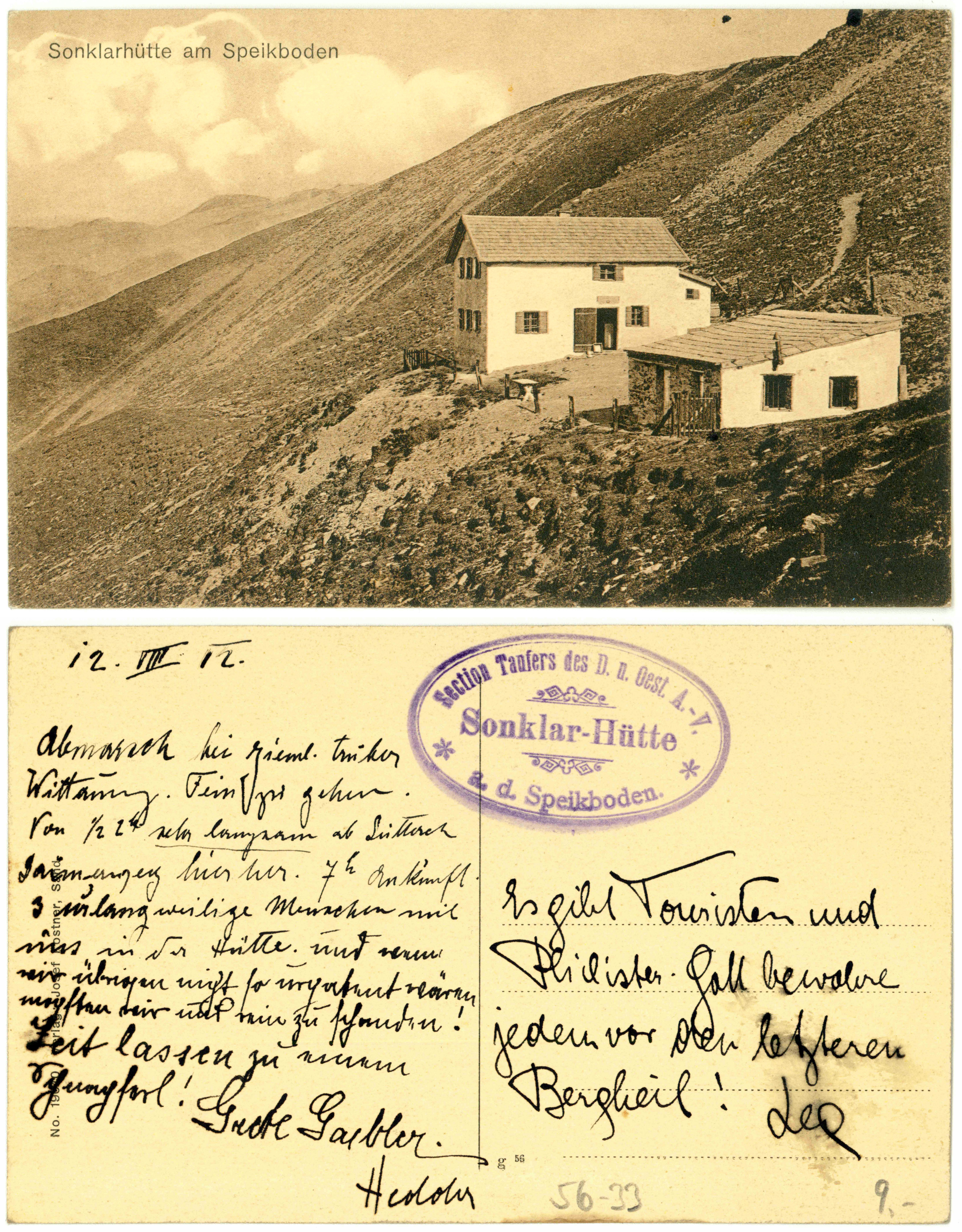
The Sonklarhütte on the Speikboden as depicted on an old postcard

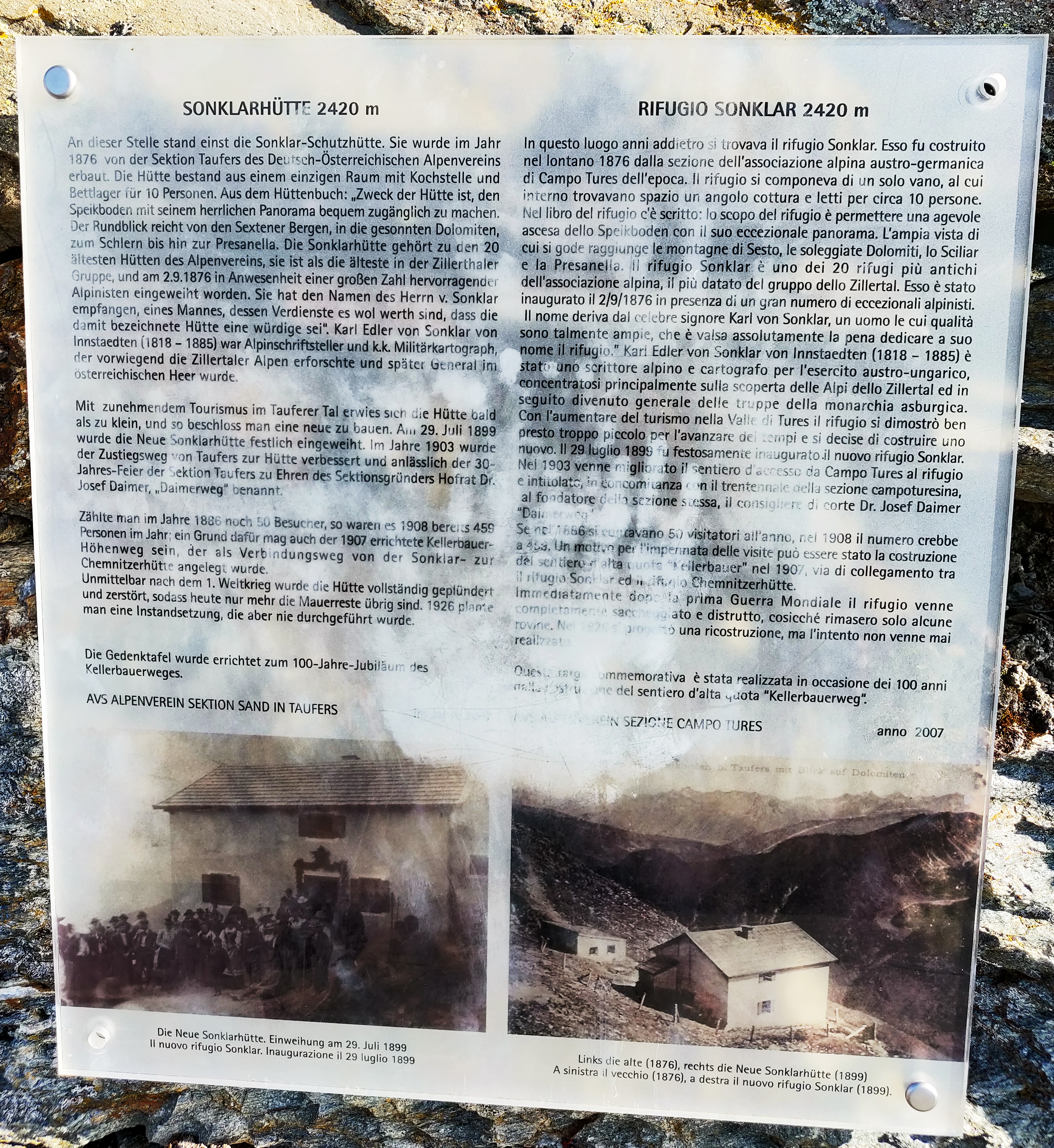
Sign beside the ruins of the Sonklarhütte on the Speikboden

=== Via ferratas ===
==== Speikboden via ferrata ====
The via ferrata on the Speikboden offers a climb with 350 meters of vertical gain up to the Speikboden summit cross at an altitude of 2,517 m

- Level of difficulty: B/C (moderately difficult)
- Start/finish: Speikboden Alm at 2,000 m, accessible via the Speikboden gondola lift
- Total ascent: 500 vertical meters| walking time: 3 hours
- Access track to the via ferrata: 150 vertical meters | walking time: 40 mins.
- Return walk to the Speikboden Alm lift station:
  - Via trail no. 27 | walking time approx. 1 ½ hours
  - Via the panorama trail | towards Sonnklarnock: 3 hours or towards Großer Nock: 2 hours
  - Using the Sonnklar chairlift | walking time: 30 mins.
- Total time required: Min. 4 hours
- Last descent with the Sonnklar chairlift: 4.30 pm
- Last descent with the Speikboden gondola: 5.00 pm
- Safety and securing aids: Steel ropes, clamps, rope bridge, hanging bridge
- Best time of year: June–October
- Views: Dolomites, Rieserferner Group, Venediger Group, Zillertal Alps
- Equipment: Climbing harness, via ferrata set, helmet, sturdy footwear (rental equipment is available from the Speikboden Alm gondola station)
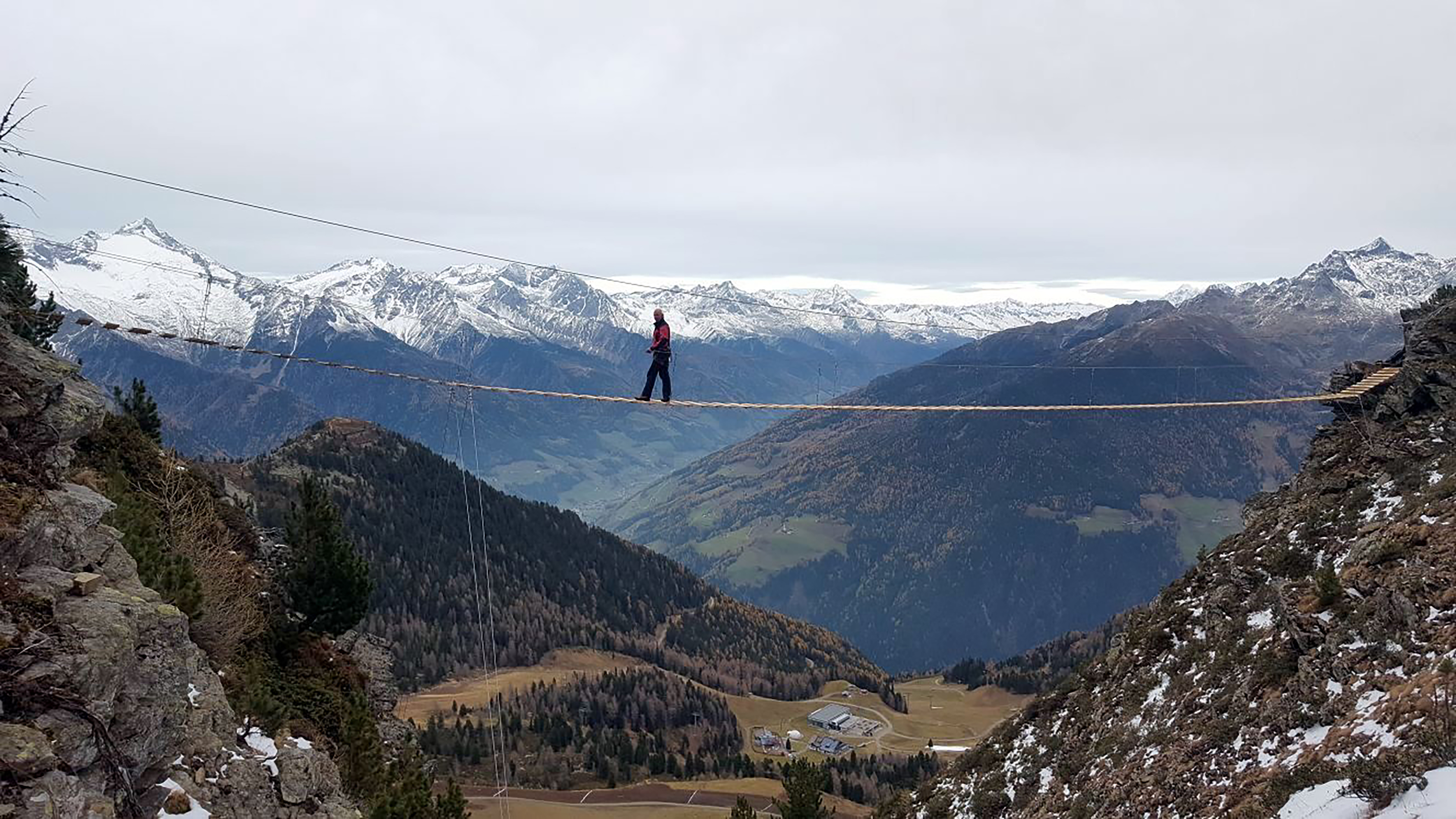
Via ferrata

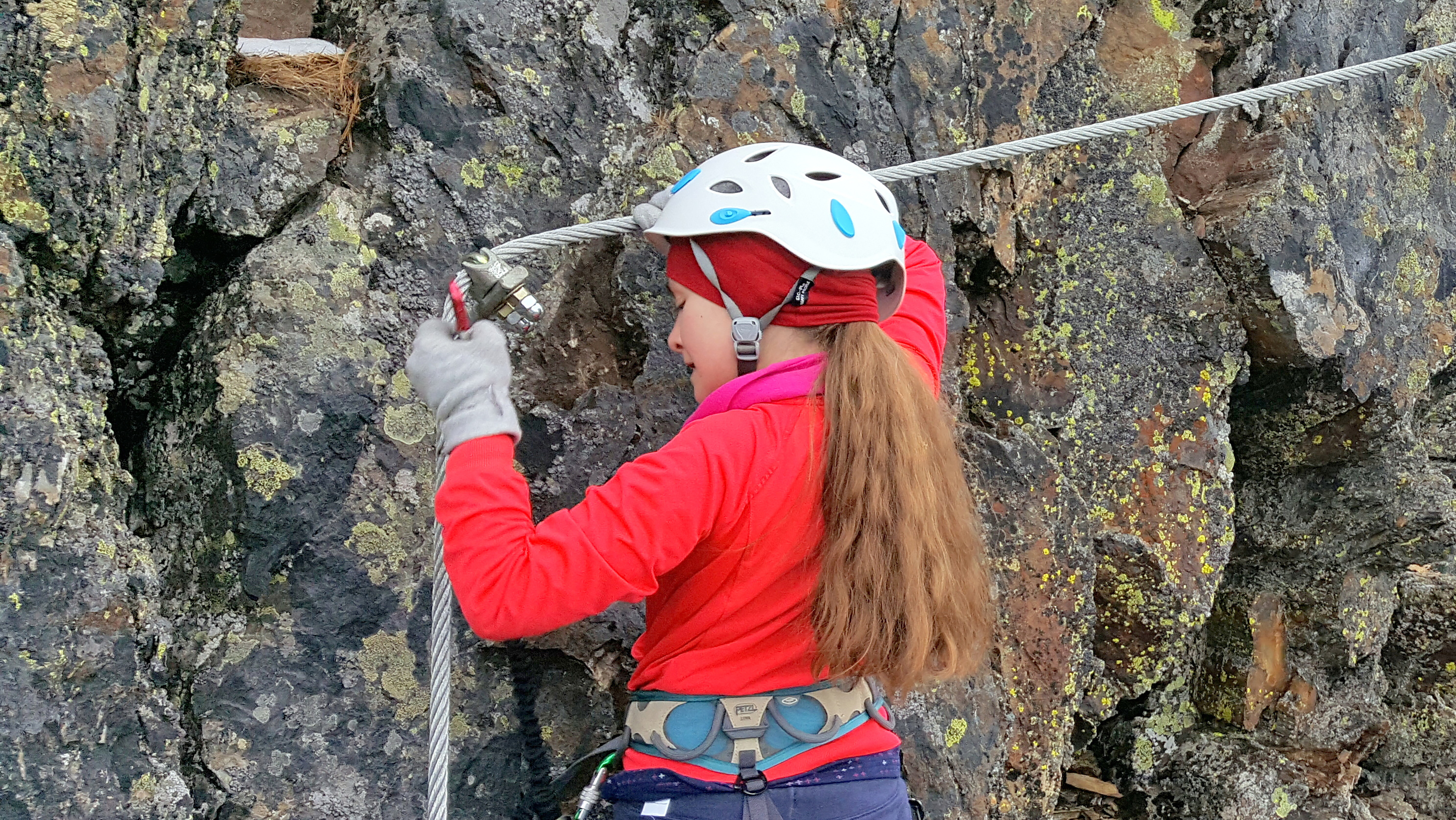
Via ferrata

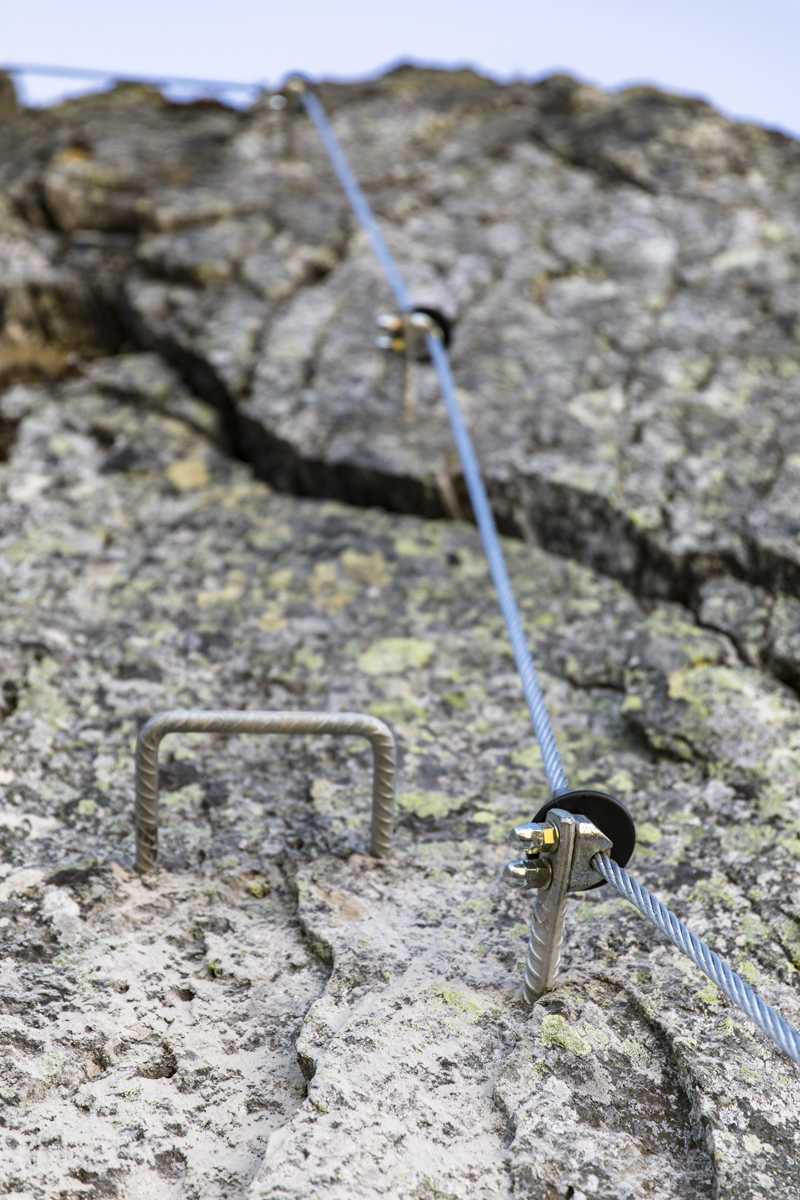
Via ferrata

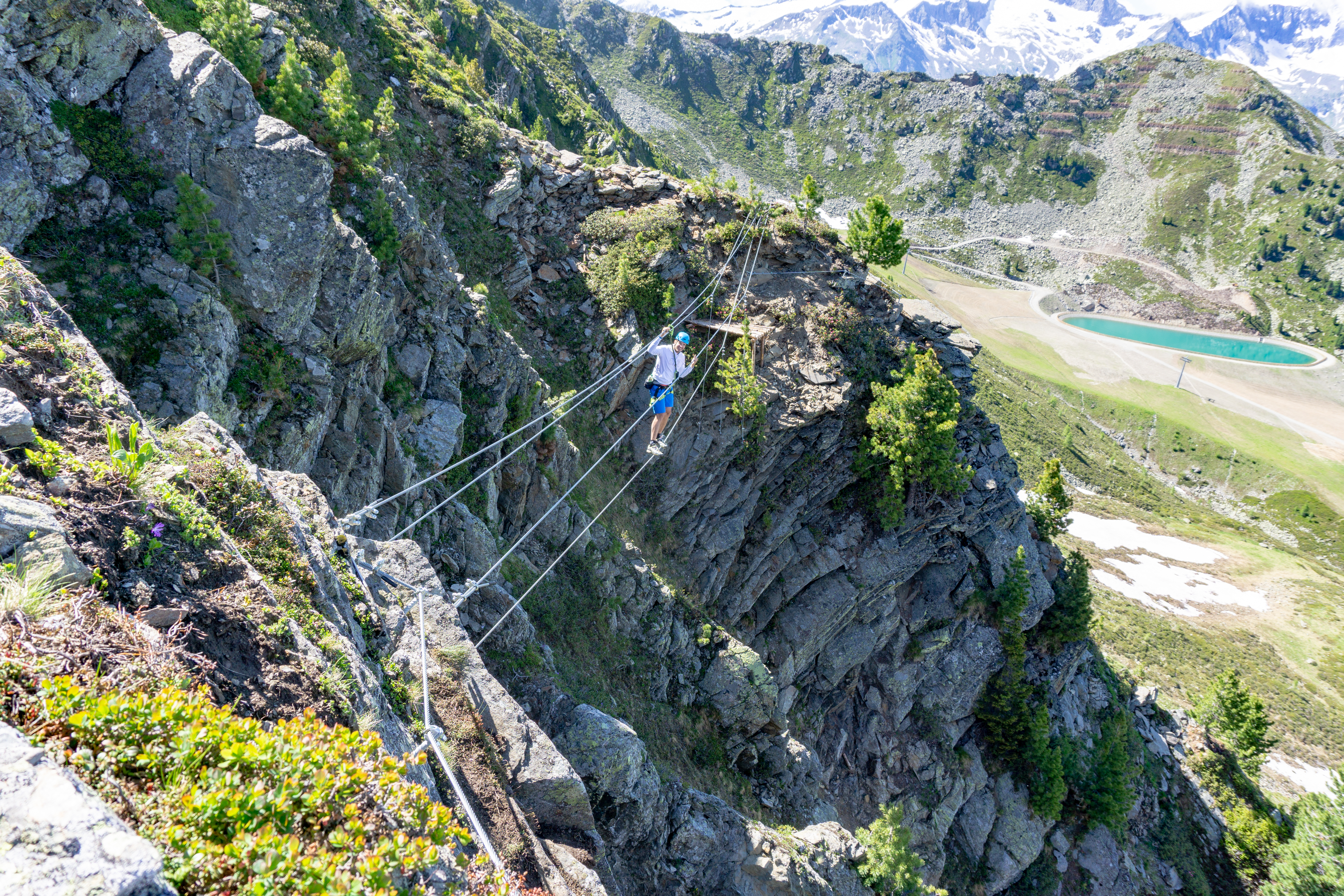
Via ferrata

==== Speikboden via ferrata for children ====
The children's via ferrata on the Speikboden was specially created for kids between the ages of 6 and 12 years. Based on a pirate theme, it offers a child-friendly route for practicing the art of climbing.

- Level of difficulty: A (easy)
- Start/finish: Speikboden Alm at 2,000 m, accessible via the Speikboden gondola lift
- Access track to the via ferrata: 50 vertical metres, 20 mins.
- Ascent: 70 vertical metres, 1 hour
- Total time required: min. 2 hours
- Equipment: Climbing harness, via ferrata set, helmet, sturdy footwear (rental equipment is available from the Speikboden Alm gondola station)

=== Ski pass association Skiworld Ahrntal ===
The two ski arenas Speikboden and Klausberg including the two town lifts Weißenbach and Rein in Taufers form together the Skiworld Ahrntal. The ski pass allows to use 21 lifts and 74 kilometers of slopes (from 950 to 2510 meters sea level). In the summer season the association Skiworld Ahrntal exists too. The tickets in summer can be used in the areas Speikboden and Klausberg.

== Panoramic view ==
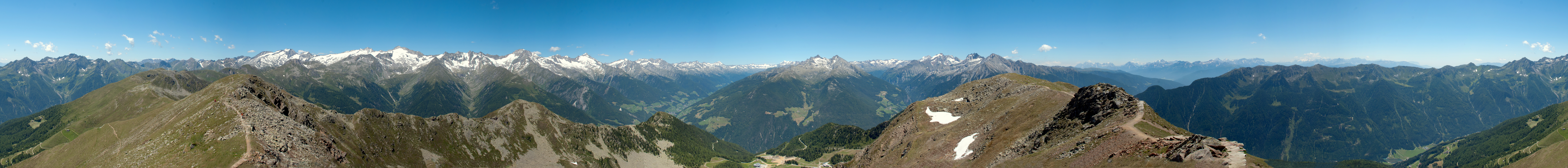
360° panoramic view from the Speikboden summit (2,517 m), Speikboden hiking area
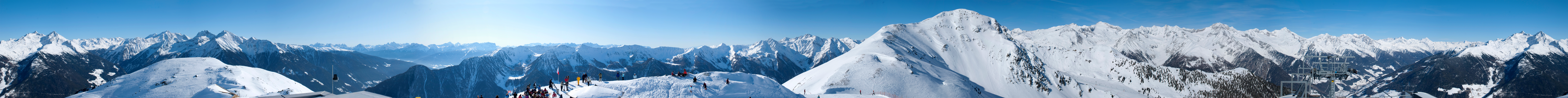
360° panoramic view from the Sonnklar top station (2,400 m), Speikboden ski area

== See also ==
- List of ski areas and resorts in Europe
