= Neves-Stausee =

Reservoir in South Tyrol, Italy

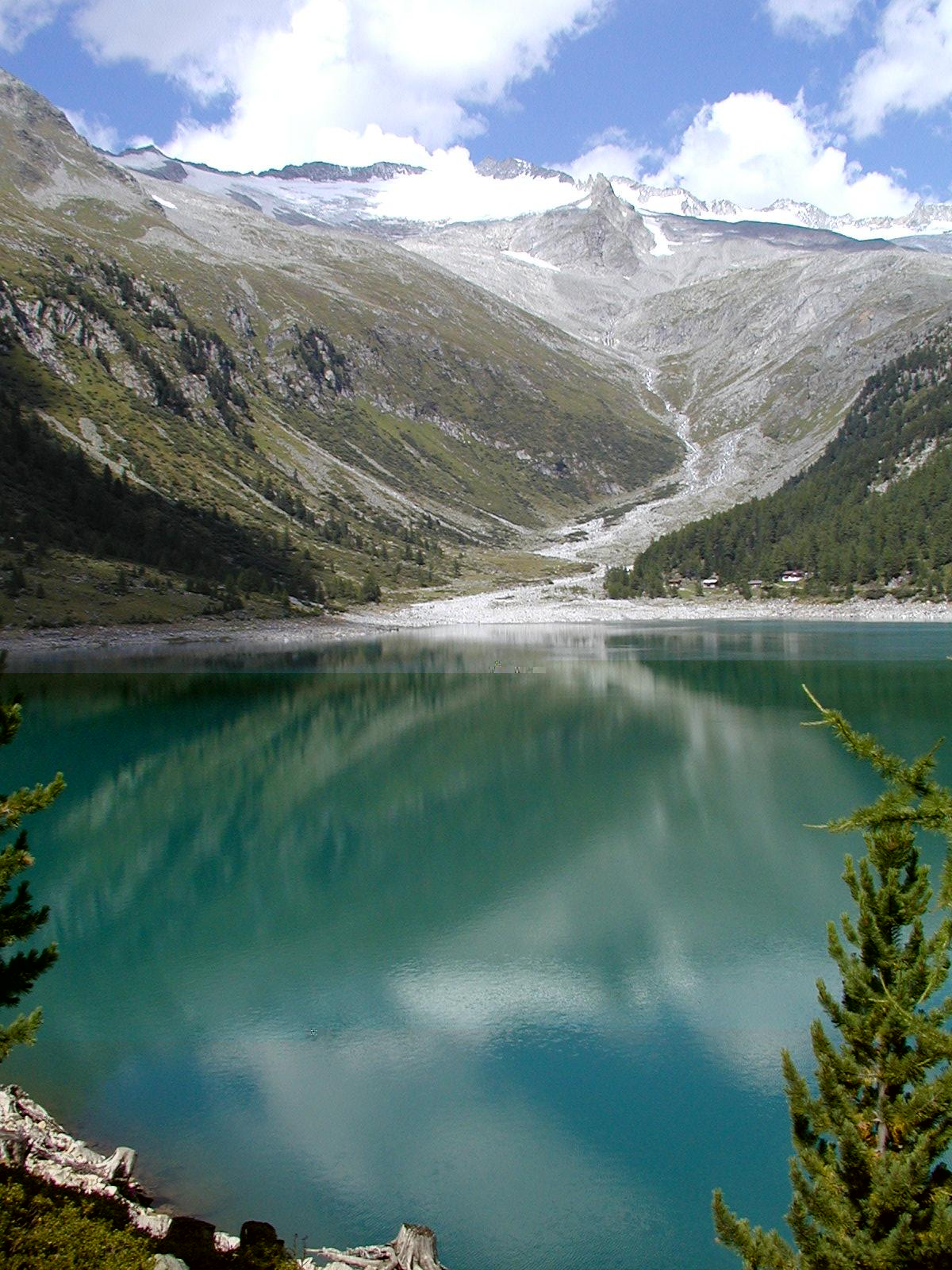

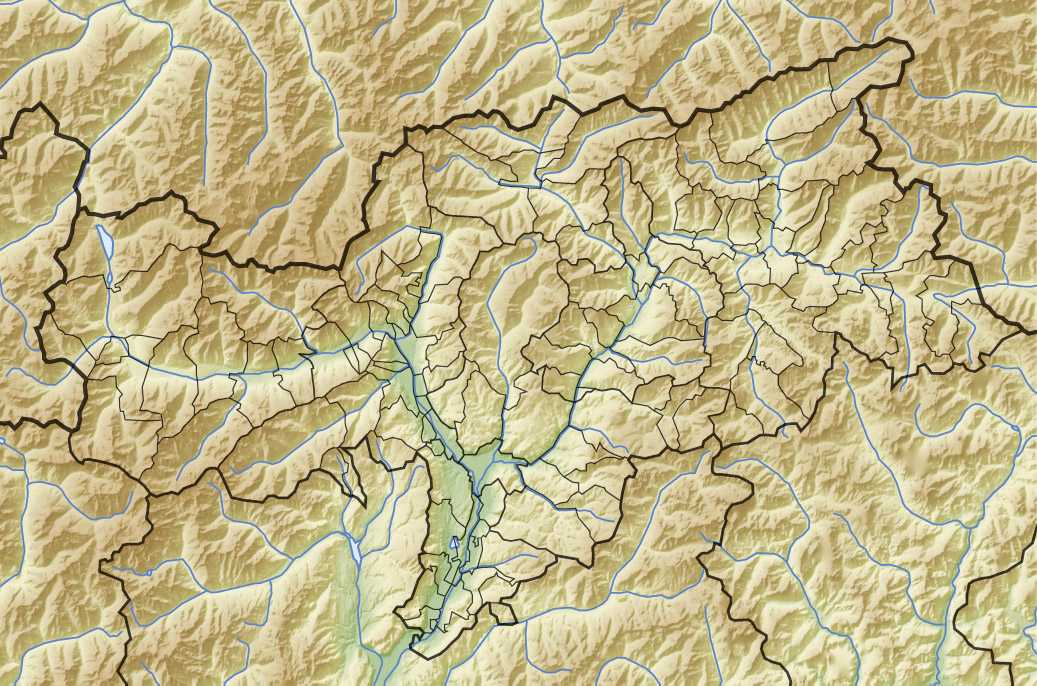
- Location within South Tyrol
- Location: South Tyrol
- Coordinates: 46°56′47″N 11°46′56″E
- Basin countries: Italy
- Surface elevation: Ca. 1,860 m (6,102 ft)
- Settlements: Lappach

The Neves-Stausee is a reservoir in the Mühlwaldertal in South Tyrol, Italy. It belongs to the municipality of Mühlwald.
