= Gais, South Tyrol =

Gais
- Comune
- Gemeinde Gais; Comune di Gais
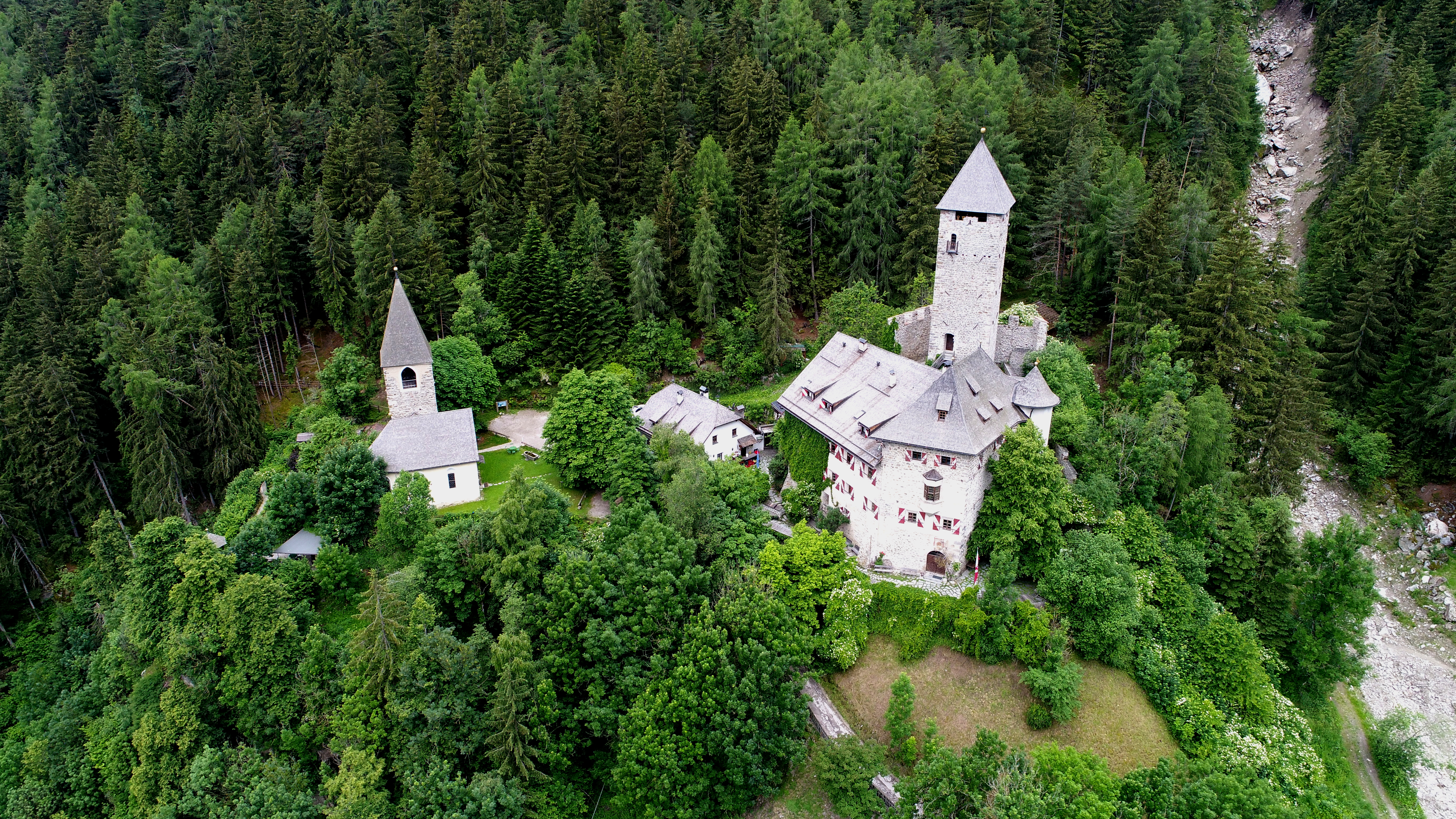
- Neuhaus Castle

- Coat of arms

- Location within Italy Location within Trentino-Alto Adige/Südtirol
- Coordinates: 46°50′N 11°57′E
- Country: Italy
- Region: Trentino-Alto Adige/Südtirol
- Province: South Tyrol (BZ)
- Frazioni: Lanebach (Lana di Gais), Mühlbach (Riomolino), Tesselberg (Montassilone) and Uttenheim (Villa Ottone)

Government
  - Mayor: Alexander Dariz (SVP)

Area
  - Total: 60.3 km^{2} (23.3 sq mi)
- Elevation: 841 m (2,759 ft)

Population (Nov. 2010)
  - Total: 3,162
  - Density: 52.4/km^{2} (136/sq mi)
- Demonym(s): German:Gaiser; Italian: di Gais
- Time zone: UTC+1 (CET)
  - Summer (DST): UTC+2 (CEST)
- Postal code: 39030
- Dialing code: 0474
- Website: Official website

Gais (Italian: [ˈɡais], German: [ˈɡaɪs]) is a comune (municipality) and a village in South Tyrol in northern Italy, located about 60 kilometres (37 mi) north-east of the city of Bolzano.

== Geography ==
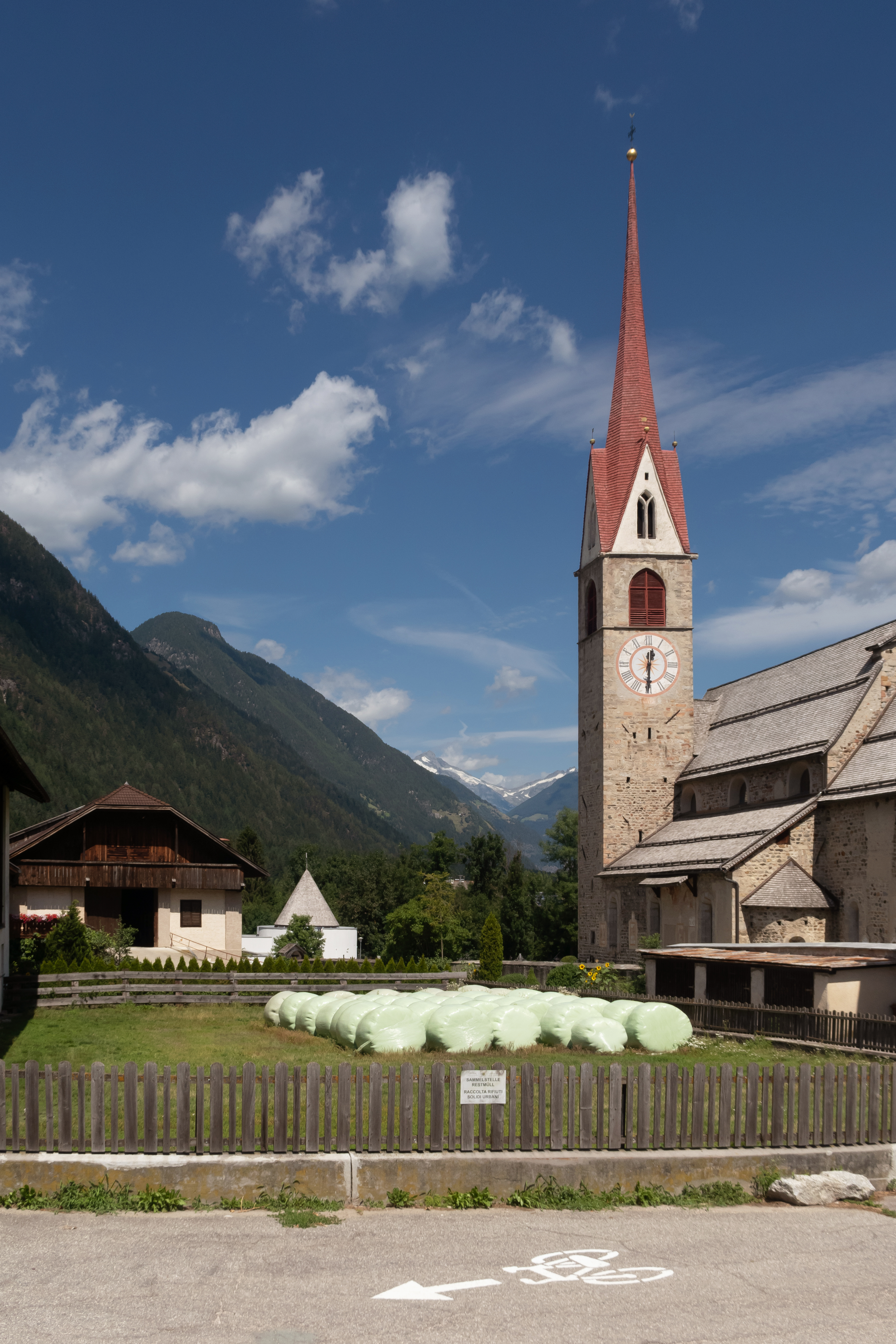
St. John in Gais

As of 30 November 2010, it had a population of 3,162 and an area of 60.3 km^{2} (23.3 sq mi).

Gais is one of the three communes of South Tyrol whose name, for the reason of sounding "romantic", remained unchanged by the early 20th century renaming programme which aimed at replacing mostly German place names with Italianised versions, the other two being Plaus and Lana.

Gais borders the following municipalities: Bruneck, Sand in Taufers, Pfalzen, Percha, and Mühlwald.

=== Frazioni ===
The municipality of Gais contains the frazioni (subdivisions, mainly villages and hamlets) Lanebach (Lana di Gais), Mühlbach (Riomolino), Tesselberg (Montassilone) and Uttenheim (Villa Ottone).

== History ==
=== Coat-of-arms ===
The emblem is party per bend or and azure with two bendlets azure; the remaining field represents a sable eagle with a halo and the head facing left. The eagle symbolizes John the Evangelist which the parish church is dedicated and the two azure bendlets the two castles Kehlburg and Neuhaus. The emblem was adopted in 1956.

== International relations ==
=== Twin towns — Sister cities ===
Gais is twinned with:

- Coburg, Germany

== Society ==
=== Linguistic distribution ===
According to the 2024 census, 96.07% of the population speak German, 3.60% Italian and 0.33% Ladin as first language.

=== Demographic evolution ===
Historical population

Year	Pop.	±%
1860	?	—
1870	?	—
1880	1,183	—
1900	?	—
1910	1,240	—

Year	Pop.	±%
1921	1,419	+14.4%
1931	1,511	+6.5%
1936	1,501	−0.7%
1951	1,597	+6.4%
1961	1,776	+11.2%

Year	Pop.	±%
1971	2,011	+13.2%
1981	2,281	+13.4%
1991	2,537	+11.2%
2001	2,865	+12.9%

Source: Data from ISTAT
