= Taufers Railway =

Coordinates: 46°55′08″N 11°57′12″E

Tauferer Bahn

Overview
- Status: abandoned
- Termini: Bruneck; Taufers
- Stations: 7

Service
- Type: passenger/freight
- Operator(s): Austrian Southern Railway / Ferrovie dello Stato

History
- Opened: July 21, 1908
- Closed: February 2, 1957

Technical
- Line length: 15.40 km (9.57 mi)
- Track gauge: 1,435 mm (4 ft 8 1/2 in)
- Electrification: 800 Volt direct current

The Tauferer Bahn (English: Taufers Railway) connected Taufers with the city of Bruneck and the Pusterer Bahn.

== Track ==
Just after leaving the station of Bruneck and after crossing the Rienz, the track followed the Ahr river until the final station in Taufers. Only two bridges were necessary to build the line. One in Uttenheim over the Ahr river and one in Mühlen in Taufers over the Mühlwalder brook. The train stations coming from Bruneck to Taufers were St. Georgen, Gais, Uttenheim, Mühlen in Taufers, Kematen and Taufers.

== History ==
The railroad was built by the Tirolean railway engineer Josef Riehl and from 1907 onwards 300 people were working on the construction site. The needed 800 Volt direct current for the train was produced by a small power plant in the valley using the water of the Ahr River. Until World War I the service was provided by the Austrian Südbahngesellschaft, which also ran the Brennerbahn and the Pusterer Bahn.

The cars had two motors with each 48 Kilowatt power. Because the line had only a single track, only one train could drive back and forward. Six trains made the trip from Bruneck to Taufers and back each day: the journey time was 50 minutes.

During the 1950s, there was a rapid rise in car ownership and train travel was seen to be in retreat. Track maintenance in mountain areas was costly. The final train service operated on the line on 31 January 1957. The rolling stock was sent to Merano and, in September 1958, sold for scrap.

As with many other former secondary train lines, the service today is provided by buses.

== Today ==
Today the track is part of the South Tyrolean bike trail network, no signs of the old railway are visible.
