= Mühlen in Taufers =

Municipality in South Tyrol, Italy

Coordinates: 46°54′N 11°56′E

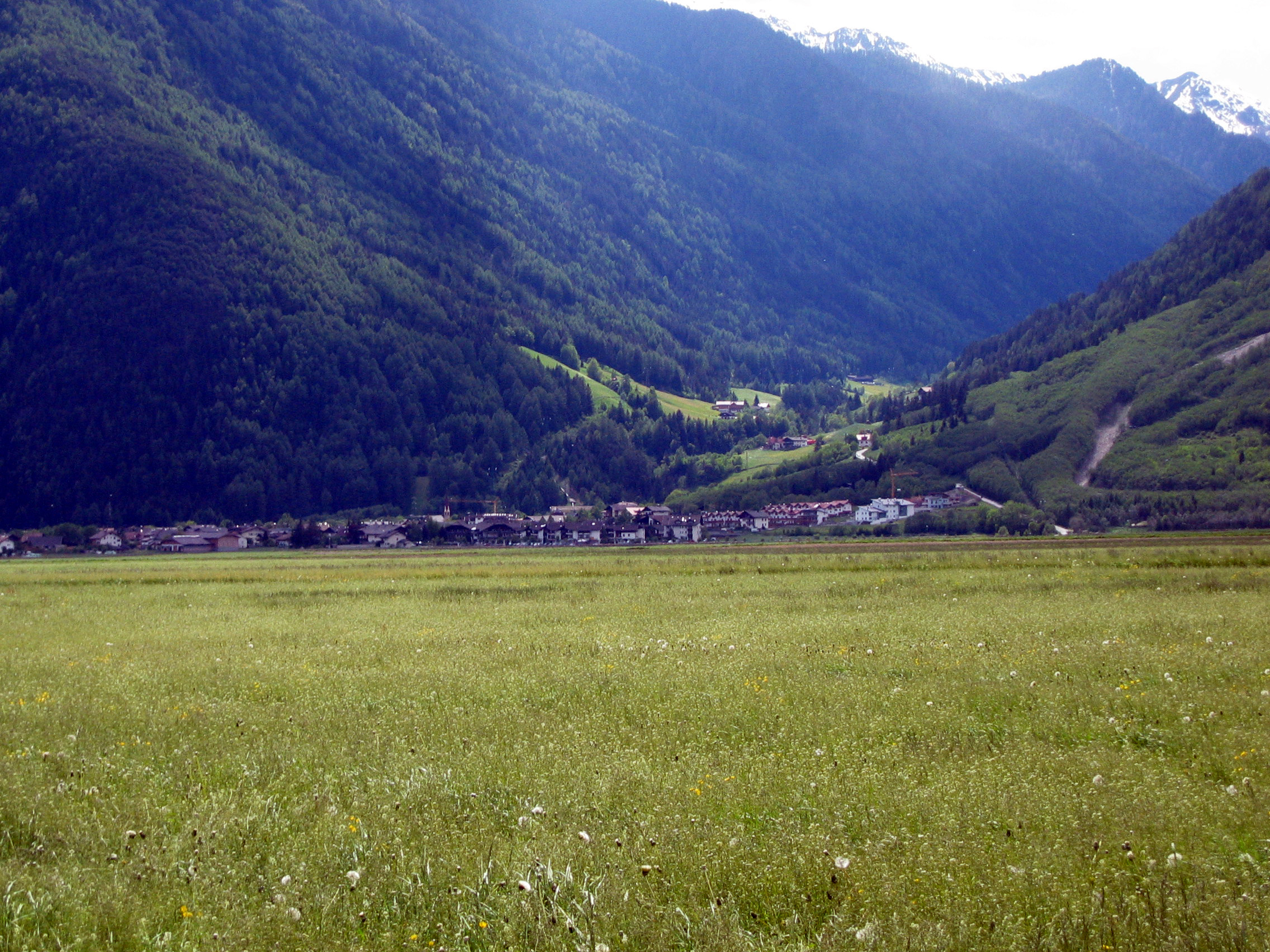
Mühlen in Taufers

Mühlen in Taufers (Italian: Molini di Tures) is a village in the municipality of Sand in Taufers (Italian: Campo Tures) in South Tyrol, Italy.
