= Mühlwald =

- Comune
- Gemeinde Mühlwald; Comune di Selva dei Molini
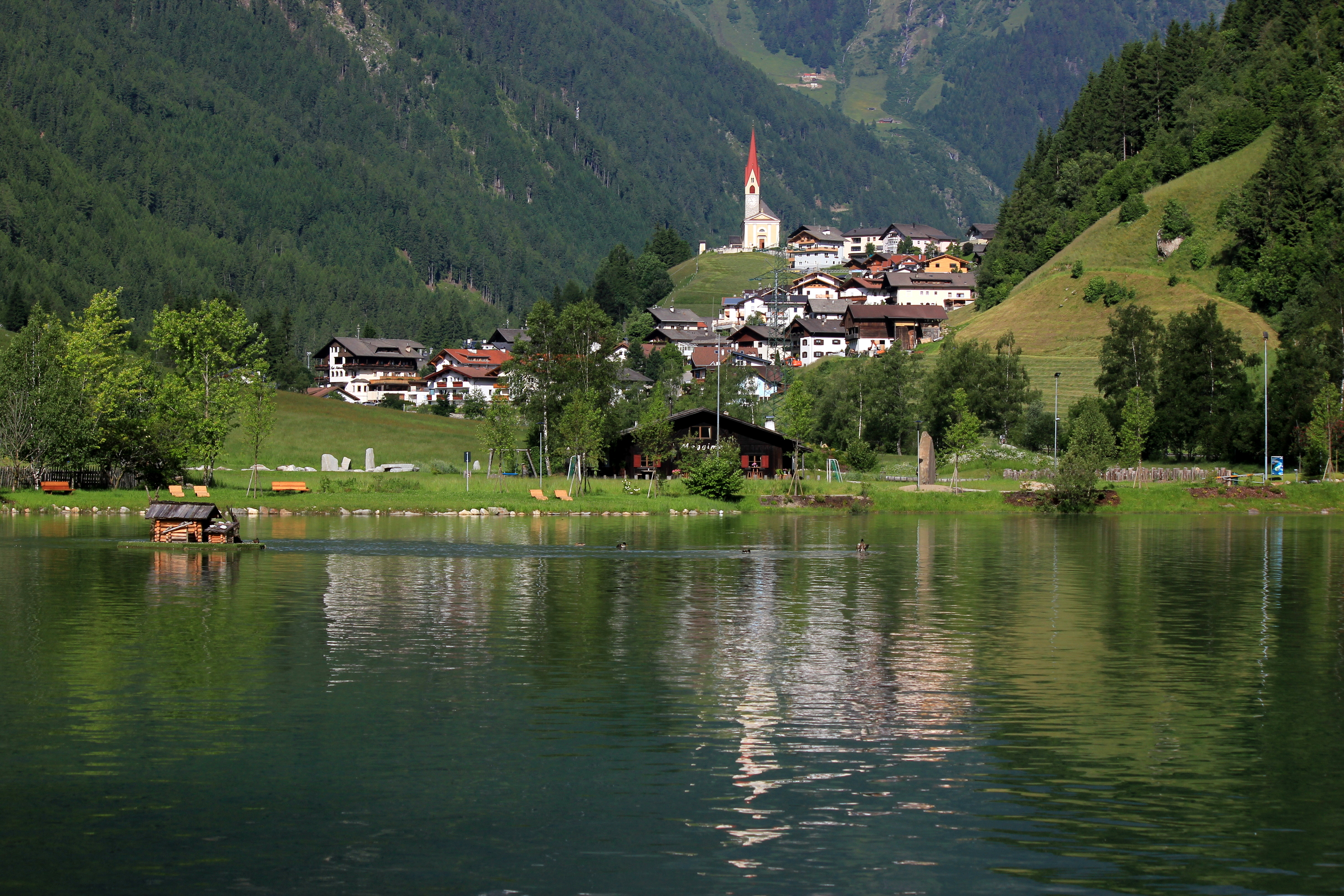
- View of Mühlwald

- Location within Italy Location within Trentino-Alto Adige/Südtirol
- Coordinates: 46°53′N 11°52′E
- Country: Italy
- Region: Trentino-Alto Adige/Südtirol
- Province: South Tyrol (BZ)
- Frazioni: Außermühlwald, Lappach (Lappago)

Government
  - Mayor: Paul Niederbrunner

Area
  - Total: 104.7 km^{2} (40.4 sq mi)
- Elevation: 1,229 m (4,032 ft)

Population (Dec. 2015)
  - Total: 1,447
  - Density: 13.82/km^{2} (35.79/sq mi)
- Demonym: German: Mühlwaldner
- Time zone: UTC+1 (CET)
  - Summer (DST): UTC+2 (CEST)
- Postal code: 39030
- Dialing code: 0474
- Website: Official website

Mühlwald (German: [ˈmyːlvalt]; Italian: Selva dei Molini [ˈselva dei moˈliːni]) is a comune (municipality) and a village in South Tyrol, a province in northern Italy, located about 60 kilometres (37 mi) northeast of Bolzano, on the border with Austria.

== Geography ==
As of 31 December 2015, it had a population of 1,442 and an area of 104.7 square kilometres (40.4 mi^{2}).

The municipality contains the frazioni of (subdivisions, mainly villages and hamlets) Außermühlwald and Lappach (Lappago).

Mühlwald borders the following municipalities: Sand in Taufers, Kiens, Pfalzen, Finkenberg (Austria), Gais, Terenten, Pfitsch, Ahrntal, and Vintl.

== History ==
=== Coat-of-arms ===
The emblem represents four fir-trees, touching the edge at the top and a water wheel on the bottom, all on a silver background. The trees symbolize the forest and the wheel the mill depicting the name of the place. The emblem was adopted in 1967.

== Society ==
=== Linguistic distribution ===
According to the 2024 census, 99.10% of the population speak German, 0.75% Italian and 0.15% Ladin as first language.

=== Demographic evolution ===
Historical population

Year	Pop.	±%
1860	?	—
1870	?	—
1880	1,493	—
1900	?	—
1910	1,329	—

Year	Pop.	±%
1921	1,334	+0.4%
1931	1,378	+3.3%
1936	1,444	+4.8%
1951	1,490	+3.2%
1961	1,596	+7.1%

Year	Pop.	±%
1971	1,521	−4.7%
1981	1,455	−4.3%
1991	1,440	−1.0%
2001	1,455	+1.0%

Source: Data from ISTAT
