= Ahrntal =

- Comune
- Gemeinde Ahrntal; Comune Valle Aurina
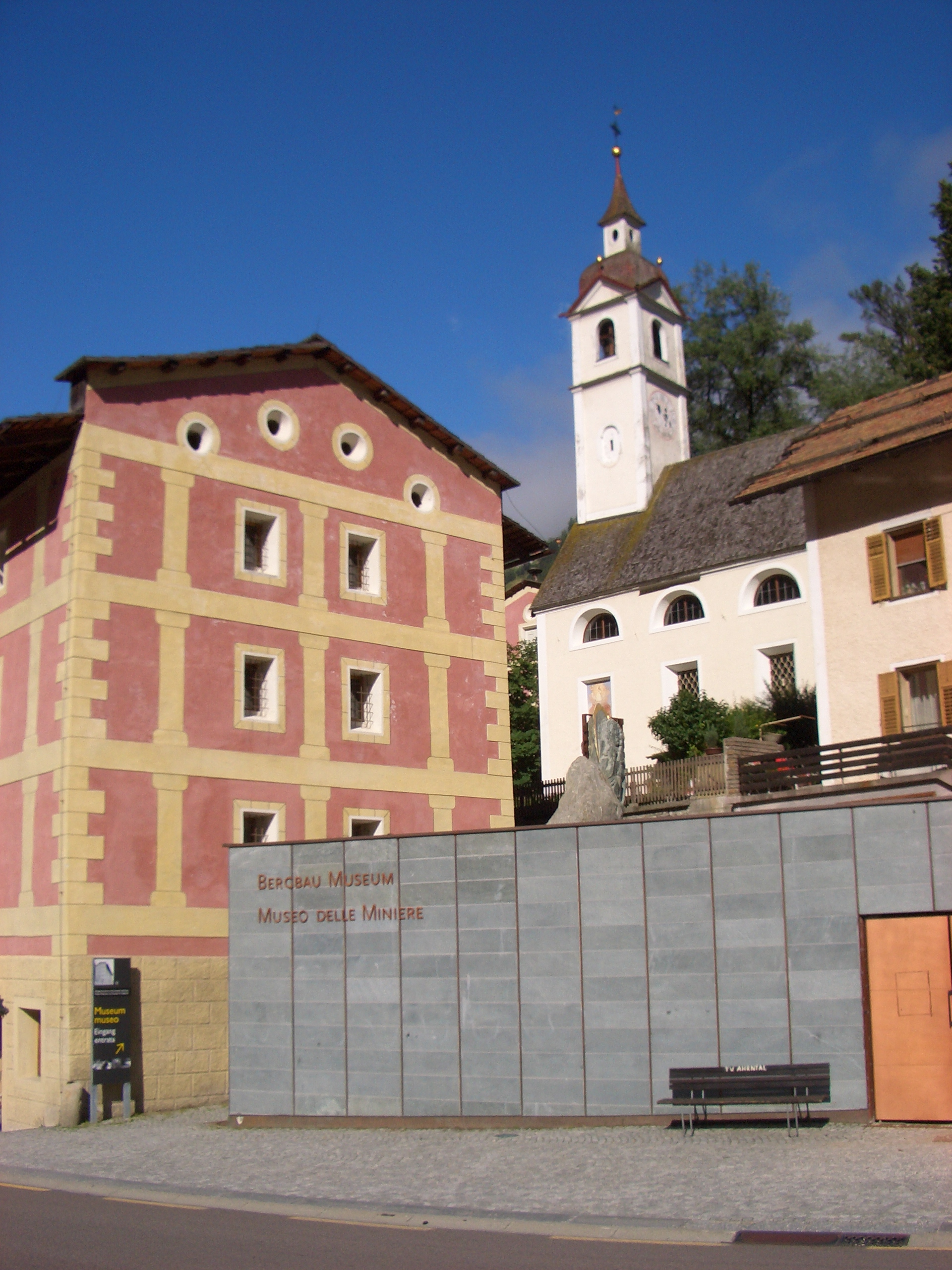
- Mining museum

- Coat of arms

- Location within Italy Location within Trentino-Alto Adige/Südtirol
- Coordinates: 47°0′N 11°59′E
- Country: Italy
- Region: Trentino-Alto Adige/Südtirol
- Province: South Tyrol (BZ)
- Frazioni: Luttach (Lutago), Steinhaus (Cadipietra), St. Jakob (San Giacomo), St. Johann (San Giovanni), St. Peter (San Pietro) and Weißenbach (Riobianco)

Government
  - Mayor: Markus Gartner (SVP)

Area
  - Total: 187.0 km^{2} (72.2 sq mi)
- Elevation: 1,054 m (3,458 ft)

Population (2015)
  - Total: 5,968
  - Density: 31.91/km^{2} (82.66/sq mi)
- Demonyms: German: Ahrntaler or Töldra; Italian: della Valle Aurina
- Time zone: UTC+1 (CET)
  - Summer (DST): UTC+2 (CEST)
- Postal code: 39030
- Dialing code: 0474
- Website: www.gemeinde-ahrntal.net

Ahrntal (German pronunciation: [ˈaːɐ̯ntaːl]; Italian: Valle Aurina [ˈvalle auˈriːna]) is a comune (municipality) in South Tyrol in northern Italy, located about 70 kilometres (43 mi) northeast of the city of Bolzano (Bozen), near the border to Austria.

== Geography ==
Ahrntal borders the following municipalities: Mühlwald, Prettau, Sand in Taufers, Brandberg (Austria), Finkenberg (Austria), and Mayrhofen (Austria).

=== Frazioni ===
The municipality contains the frazioni (subdivisions, mainly villages and hamlets) Luttach (Lutago), Steinhaus (Cadipietra), St. Jakob (San Giacomo), St. Johann (San Giovanni), St. Peter (San Pietro) and Weißenbach (Riobianco).

Weißenbach is composed of picturesque Alpine farmhouses, grouped around the foaming white glacial stream from which its name is derived. With a population of around 550, it has an elevation of 1,350 metres (4,430 ft) above sea level.

=== Topography ===
To the north, west and southwest, the municipality is surrounded by the Zillertal Alps. The main chain of these Alps at the head of the valley also forms the border with Austria. Amongst the most important mountains in the municipality are the Turnerkamp (3,418 m), the Hornspitzen, the Schwarzenstein (3,369 m), the Großer Löffler (3,379 m), the Wollbachspitze (3,210 m) and the Napfspitze (3,144 m). The ranges to the west and southwest, including the Speikboden massiv, separate the village of Ahrntal from Mühlwald in the Mühlwalder Tal. To the southeast are the Durreck Group, a subrange of the Venediger Group with the Durreck (3,135 m) and the Hirbernock (3,010 m) which form the boundary of the municipality of Reintal and its village of Rein in Taufers. Large parts of the Durreck Group are protected as part of the Rieserferner-Ahrn Nature Park.

== History ==
A highlight is the Church of St. Jacob, dating from the 16th century. The church houses a valuable winged altar from 1516, which was restored in 1884. Also of note are both the modern extension to the church building and the newly arranged adjoining cemetery.

=== Place name ===
A name for the valley was first recorded in written sources in the 11th century. An Aurina vallis is mentioned in 1048. Between 1070 and 1080 Ourin or Ouren appear in documents.

=== Coat-of-arms ===
The emblem is tierced of paly: in the first and third are four and half points of argent on azure, in the second a vert pale with a wavy line of argent. The emblem show the position of the municipality along the green valley with the river Ahr and the mountains all around. The emblem was granted in 1969.

== Notable people ==
- Simon Maurberger (born 1995), World Cup alpine ski racer.

== Society ==
Church of Sankt Martin in Ahrntal Valley

=== Linguistic distribution ===
According to the 2024 census, 98.14% of the population speak German, 1.57% Italian and 0.29% Ladin as first language.

Language	2001	2011	2024
German	98.79%	98.76%	98.14%
Italian	1.07%	0.93%	1.57%
Ladin	0.13%	0.31%	0.29%

=== Demographic evolution ===
Historical population

Year	Pop.	±%
1860	?	—
1870	?	—
1880	3,125	—
1900	?	—
1910	3,126	—

Year	Pop.	±%
1921	3,263	+4.4%
1931	3,274	+0.3%
1936	3,581	+9.4%
1951	4,085	+14.1%
1961	4,360	+6.7%

Year	Pop.	±%
1971	4,630	+6.2%
1981	4,934	+6.6%
1991	5,261	+6.6%
2001	5,517	+4.9%

Source: Data from ISTAT

== Tourism ==
Ahrntal is a well-known summer and winter resort. Nestled in the alpine landscape of the Zillertal Alps, the Durreck group, and the Rieserferner Group, the region features an extensive network of hiking trails and over 50 managed alpine pastures. A large part of the municipal territory is protected within the Rieserferner-Ahrn Nature Park.

For winter sports, the Klausberg ski resort in Steinhaus and the nearby Speikboden ski resort are available. In the winter months, the municipality also offers groomed cross-country skiing trails and several natural toboggan runs, such as those in the mountaineering village of Weißenbach.

Year-round tourist and cultural attractions include various museums, such as the South Tyrol Mining Museum in the Kornkasten Steinhaus, the Maranatha Folk Art and Nativity Museum in Luttach, and the Kirchler Minerals Museum in St. Johann.

== See also ==
- Tauferer Ahrntal
