= Western Tauern Alps =

- German: Westliche Tauernalpen; Italian: Alpi dei Tauri occidentali
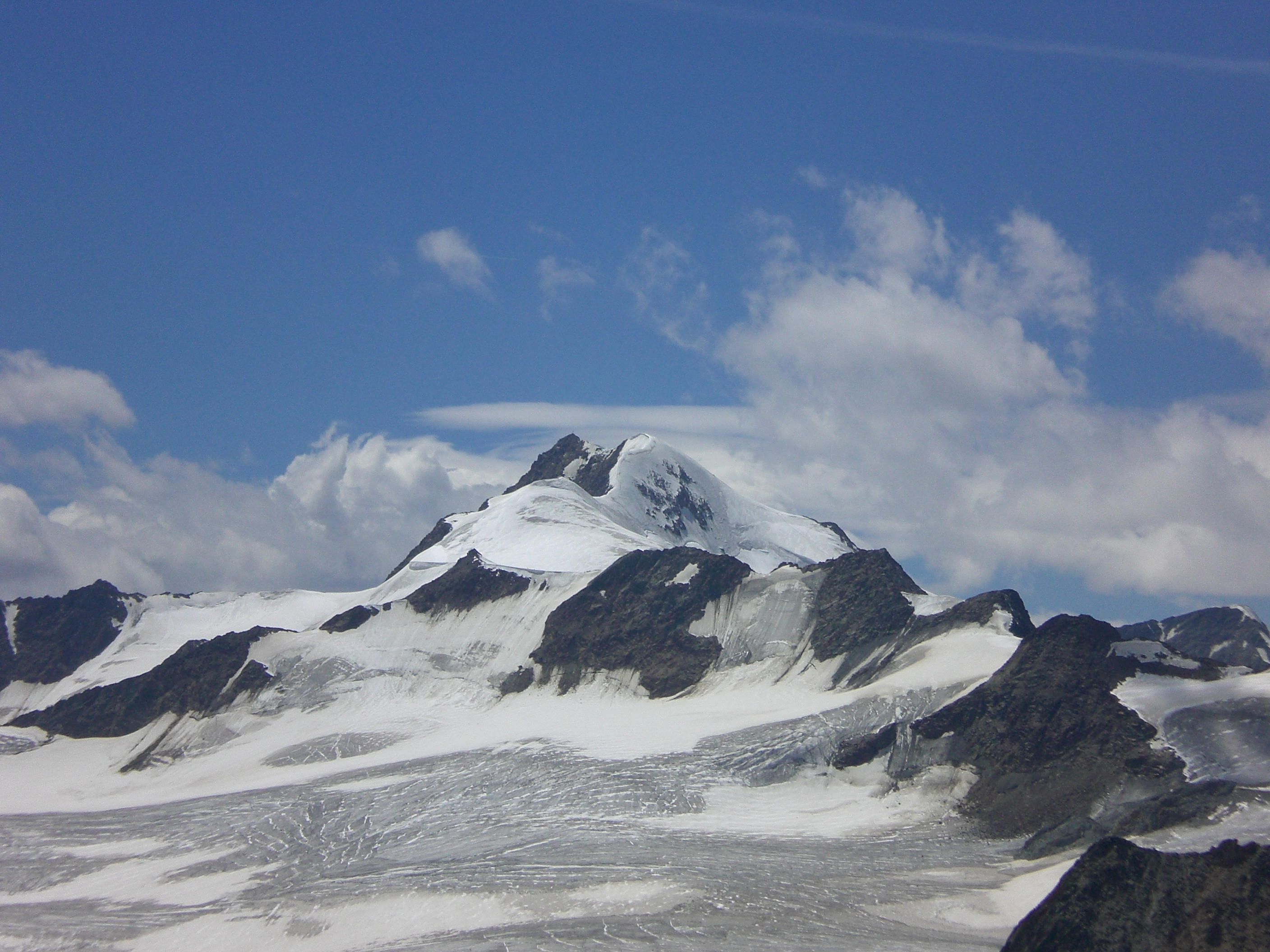
- The Grossglockner, the highest mountain of the range

Highest point
- Peak: Grossglockner
- Elevation: 3,798 m (12,461 ft)
- Coordinates: 47°04′29″N 12°41′42″E

Geography
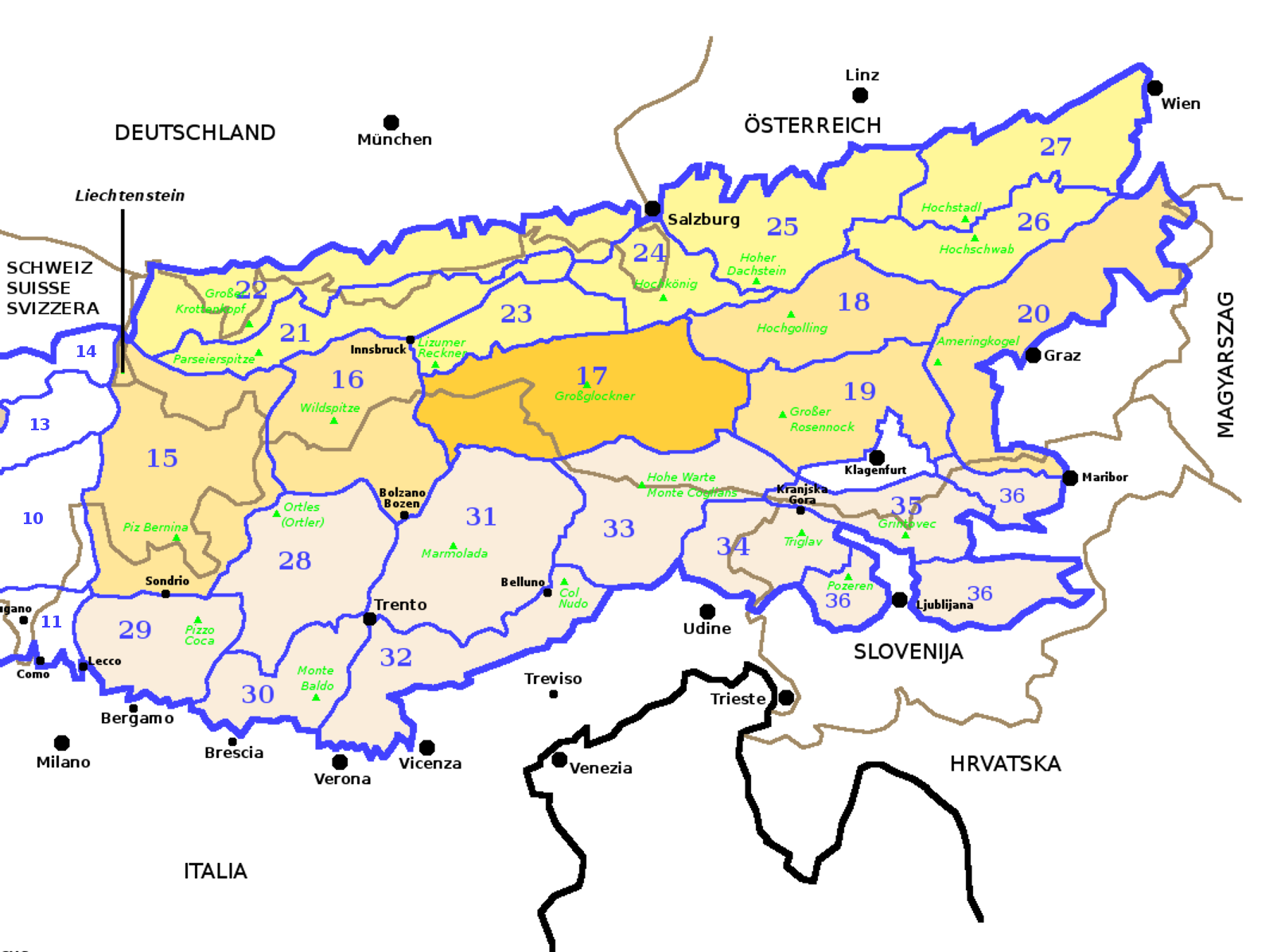
- Western Tauern Alps (17) within Eastern Alps
- Countries: Austria and Italy
- States of Austria, regions of Italy: Tyrol, Carinthia, Salzburg, Trentino-Alto Adige/Südtirol
- Parent range: Central Eastern Alps
- Borders on: Eastern Rhaetian Alps, Southern Rhaetian Alps, Dolomites, Carnic and Gailtal Alps, Carinthian-Styrian Alps, Eastern Tauern Alps, Northern Salzburg Alps and Tyrol Schistose Alps

Geology
- Orogeny: Alpine orogeny

The Western Tauern Alps (German: Westliche Tauernalpen, Italian: Alpi dei Tauri occidentali) are a mountain range of the Central Eastern Alps.

== Geography ==
The range is bound by the Salzach river in the north; in the south the upper Drava and the Rienz in the Puster Valley form the border with the Southern Limestone Alps. In the west the Wipptal Valley up to the Brenner Pass and the course of the Eisack (Isarco) river separate it from the Eastern Rhaetian Alps. Administratively the Western Tauern Alps belong to the Austrian states of Tyrol, Salzburg and Carinthia and, in the southwest, to the Italian region of Trentino-Alto Adige/Südtirol.

=== SOIUSA classification ===
According to SOIUSA (International Standardized Mountain Subdivision of the Alps) the mountain range is an Alpine section, classified in the following way:

- main part = Eastern Alps
- major sector = Central Eastern Alps
- section = Western Tauern Alps
- code = II/A-17

=== Subdivision ===
The range is divided into four Alpine subsections:

- Zillertal Alps (German: Zillertaler Alpen; Italian: Alpi Aurine) - SOIUSA code: II/A-17.I,
- High Tauern (German: Hohe Tauern; Italian: Alti Tauri) - SOIUSA code: II/A-17.II,
- Villgraten Mountains (German: Villgratner Berge or Deferegger Alpen; Italian: Alpi Pusteresi) - SOIUSA code: II/A-17.III,
- Kreuzeck group (German: Kreuzeckgruppe; Italian: Gruppo del Kreuzeck) - SOIUSA code: II/A-17.IV.

== Notable summits ==
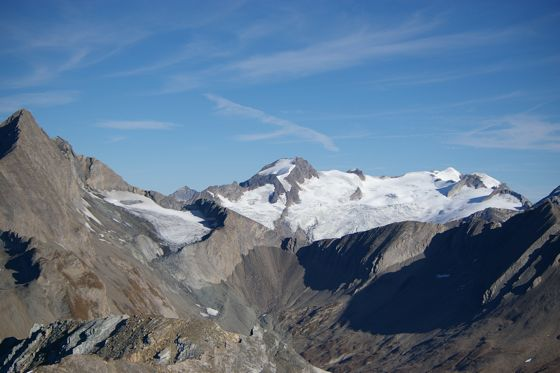
The Dreiherrnspitze, on the Austrian-Italian border

Some notable summits of the range are:

| Name | elevation (m) | Alpine subsection |
|---|---|---|
| Großglockner | 3.798 | High Tauern |
| Großvenediger | 3.666 | High Tauern |
| Hochfeiler | 3.510 | Zillertal Alps |
| Dreiherrnspitze | 3.499 | High Tauern |
| Rötspitze | 3.495 | High Tauern |
| Olperer | 3.476 | Zillertal Alps |
| Hochgall | 3.436 | High Tauern |
| Großer Löffler | 3.376 | Zillertal Alps |
| Hohe Wand | 3.289 | Zillertal Alps |
| Wollbachspitze | 3.210 | Zillertal Alps |
| Kitzsteinhorn | 3.203 | High Tauern |
| Wilde Kreuzspitze | 3.134 | Zillertal Alps |
| Glockenkarkopf | 2.911 | Zillertal Alps |
