= Großer Möseler =

Mountain in Italy

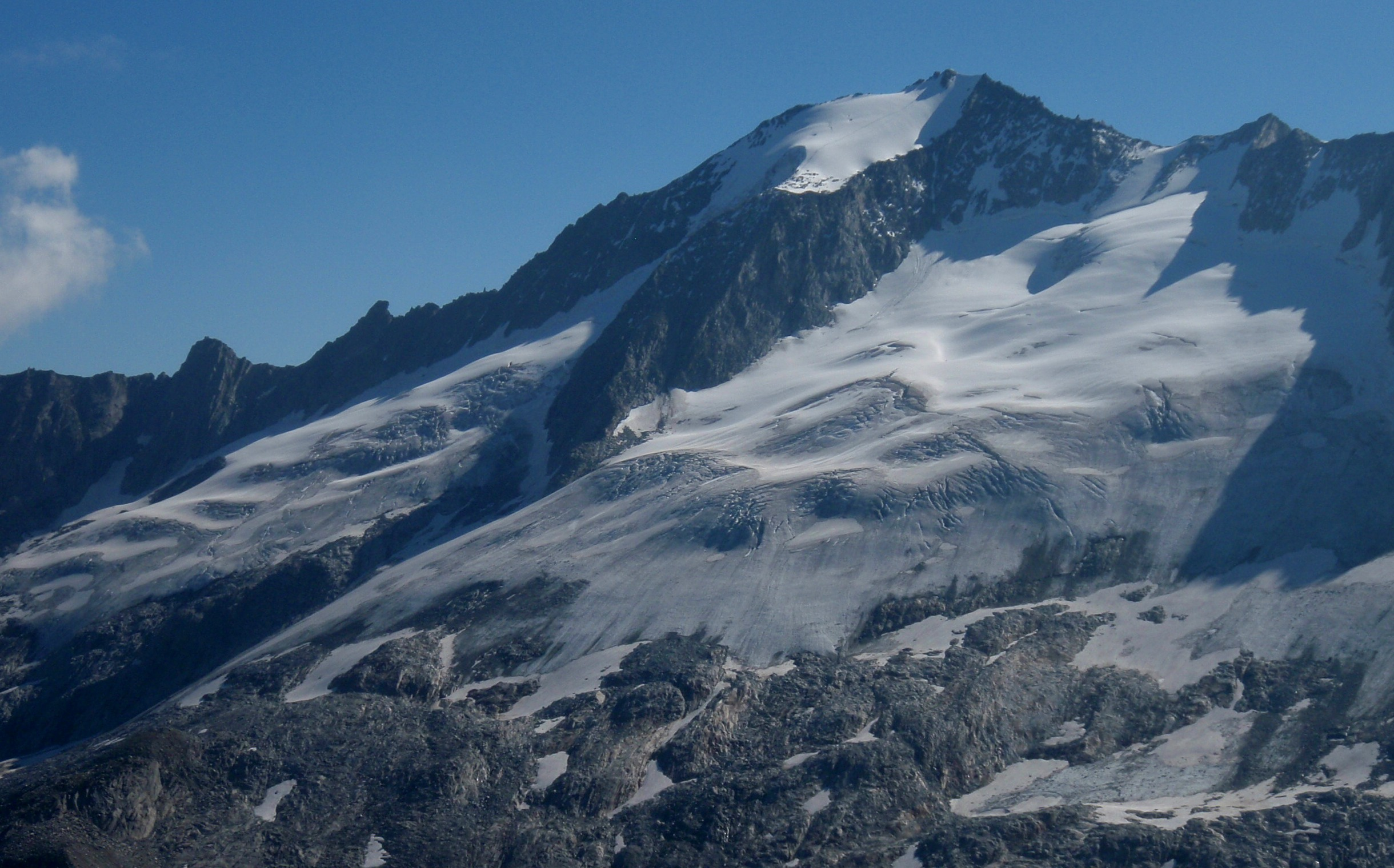
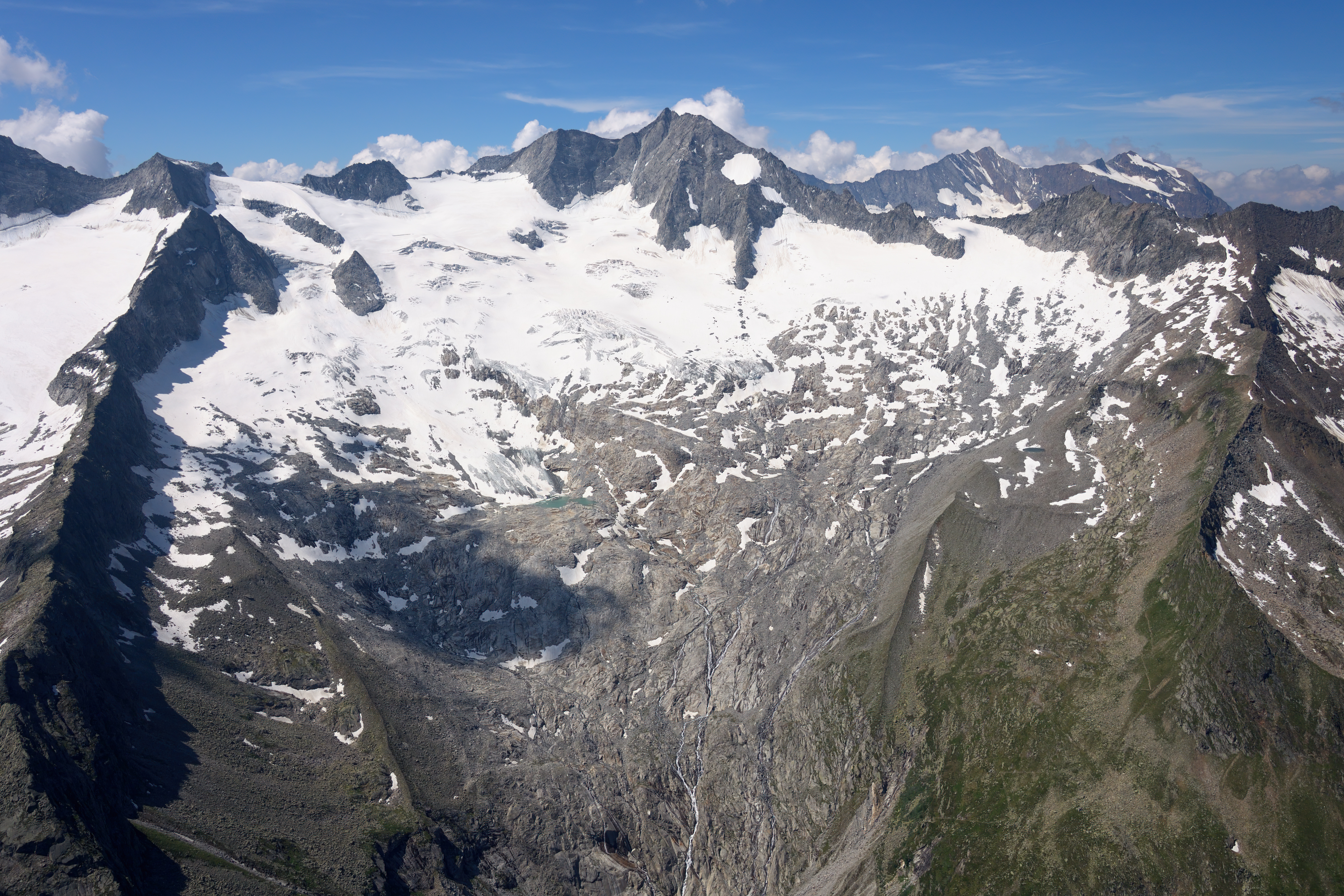
- View of the Großer Möseler from the Schlegeiskees (i.e. from the WSW) The Großer Möseler from the northeast with the Waxeggkees, 2026

Highest point
- Elevation: 3,480 m (AA) (11,420 ft)
- Prominence: 3,480-3,025 m ↓ Neveser Saddle
- Isolation: 4.7 km → Hochfeiler
- Listing: Alpine mountains above 3000 m
- Coordinates: 46°59′33″N 11°46′54″E

Geography
- Location within Austria
- Location: Tyrol, Austria and South Tyrol, Italy
- Parent range: Zillertal Alps

Climbing
- First ascent: 16 June 1865 by G. H. Fox, Douglas William Freshfield and Francis Fox Tuckett with mountain guides, François Devouassoud and Peter Michel

The Große Möseler (Italian: Grande Mèsule), also called the Mösele, is a mountain, 3,480 m (AA), and thus the second highest peak in the Zillertal Alps after the Hochfeiler (3,509 m). It lies on the Zillertal main ridge which forms the border here between the Austrian state of Tyrol and the Italian province of South Tyrol. Its great size makes it the dominant mountain in the area. Seen from the northwest it appears like a firn-covered dome; but from the northeast as a regularly shaped cone of rock. Prominent arêtes radiate from the peak to the northwest, east and south. The mountain is easily ascended from the Furtschaglhaus and is often visited as a result. It was first climbed on 16 June 1865 by G. H. Fox, Douglas William Freshfield and Francis Fox Tuckett with mountain guides, François Devouassoud from Chamonix and Peter Michel from Grindelwald, as well as two unknown bearers.

== Surrounding area ==
The Großer Möseler is part of the Zillertal main crest, a dominant mountain chain of peaks over 3,000 metres high. Its neighbouring summits are: the subpeak of Möselekopf (3,390 m) to the south and separated by the Westliche Möselescharte notch; the Breitnock (Dosso Largo, 3,215 m) further along the Southwest Arête and separated by Nöfes Saddle a crossing at 3,029 metres; the 3,188-metre-high Furtschaglspitze on the North Arête; and the 3,304-metre-high Roßruggspitze and the Turnerkamp (Cima di Campo, 3,418 m) to the east, separated by the 3,240-metre-high Östliche Möselescharte ("Eastern Mösele Notch"). The Möseler is surrounded by the glaciated areas of the Schlegeiskees and Furtschaglkees to the west, the Waxeckkees to the north and the West Nevesferner (Westlicher Nevesferner) and East Nevesferner (Östlichen Nevesferner) to the south.

== Climbing history ==
In the first half of the 19th century, it was believed that the Schwarzenstein was the highest mountain in the Zillertal Alps. But when, in 1858, the Austrian alpine researcher and geographer, Anton von Ruthner, stood on the summit of this mountain, he realized that the Möseler, which he called the Schneeberg, to the west had to be significantly higher. On 12 August 1863, von Ruthner attempted an ascent of the Möseler with two guides from Breitlahner in the Zemmgrund, but in thick fog only reached the Nöfes Saddle, which they initially thought was the Möseler. When, later, the fog lifted, they realized their error. However, they were not the first to have used this well-trodden, ancient crossing. Not until the tour by Englishman, Francis Fox Tuckett on 16 June 1865, with his Swiss mountain guides and local bearers, did someone successfully conquer the mountain. That tour began in South Tyrol's Lappach in the Lappach valley (now part of the municipality of Muehlwald) at four clock in the morning and headed north to the East Nevesferner. After crossing the glacier, they reached the South Arête of the Möseler in fog, but only got as far as the southern subpeak, the significantly lower Möselekopf. As the fog lifted, they realized that they had not climbed the main peak; instead the highest point appeared to the northeast as a broad rocky summit. Finally, crossing the icy South Arête they reached the Great Möseler after two and a half more hours at 12.30 pm. As the weather cleared, Tuckett now realized that even the tediously conquered Großer Möseler was not the highest mountain in the Zillertal Alps. To the west, an icy summit towered even higher above them. An angle measurement brought unwelcome confirmation: this ice pinnacle, later called the Hochfeiler, had to be the long-sought after, highest point of the mountain range. The mountaineers descended northwards to Schlegeistal valley and at around 9 pm they finally reached the Alpine hut at Breitlahner.

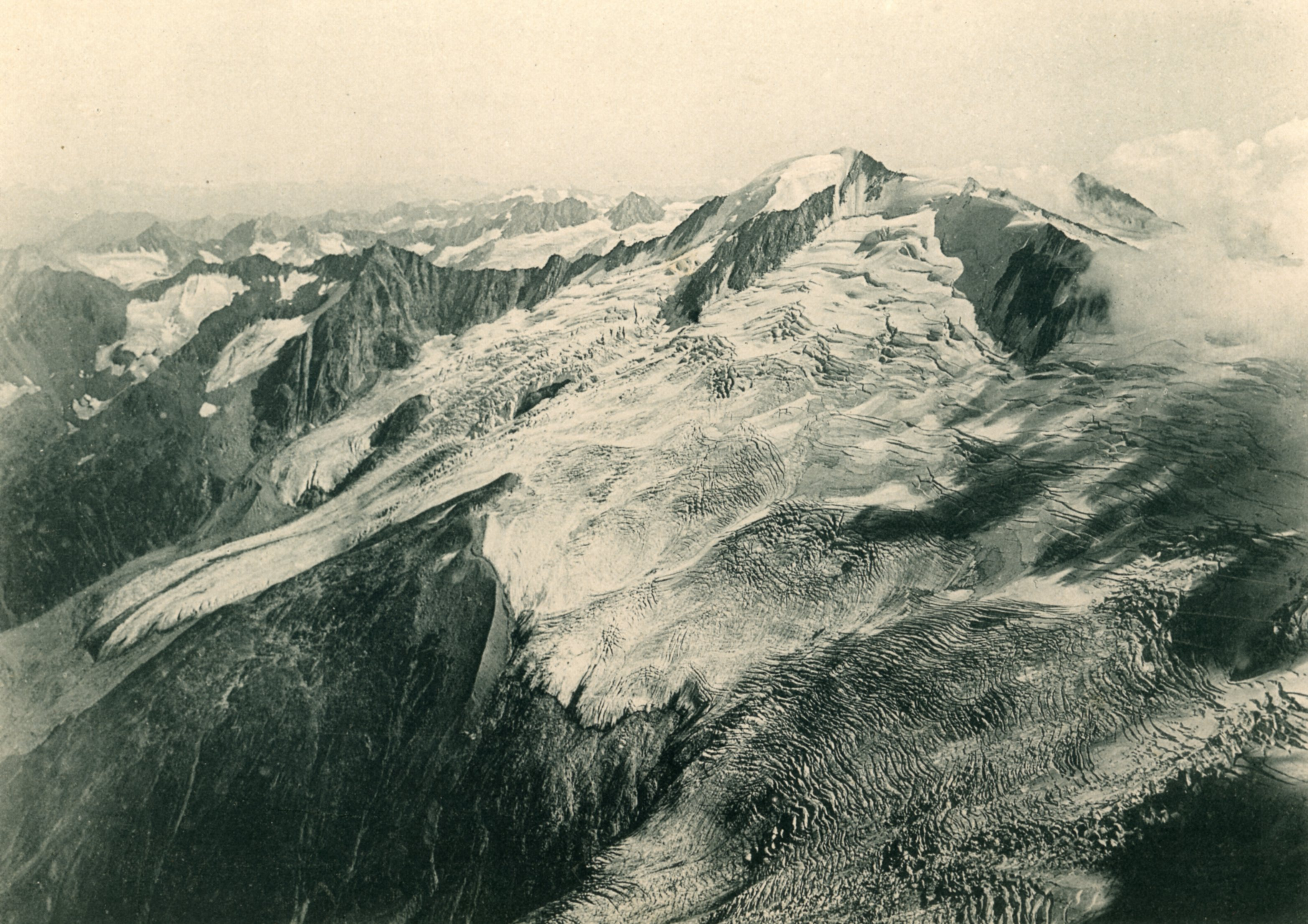
Historic photograph about 1890

== Bases and tours ==
- The present-day western normal route to the Großer Möseler is a combined ice and rock tour (mountain tour) in four hours from the Furtschaglhaus (2,295 m) over the heavily crevassed Furtschaglkees and the West Arête to the summit (according to the literature the icy summit ridge is often underestimated and problematic). Alpine experience and equipment for glacier crossing are essential.
- The southern normal route (in the late summer heat often clear of ice) takes also about four hours from the Chemnitzer Hut (Rifugio Giovanni Porro at 2,419 m) along the Neves Ridgeway (Neveser Höhenweg) and the scree field of Großer Trog to the top.
- Another possible ascent is via the Edelraut Hut (Rifugio Passo Ponte di Ghiaccio, 2,545 m) and the Neves Ridgeway.

== Literature and maps ==
- Heinrich Klier, Walter Klier: Alpine Club Guide Zillertaler Alpen, Munich, 1996, ISBN 3-7633-1269-2
- Alpine Club Map 1:25,000, Sheet 35/1, Zillertaler Alpen West
