= Rauhkofel =

Mountain in Italy

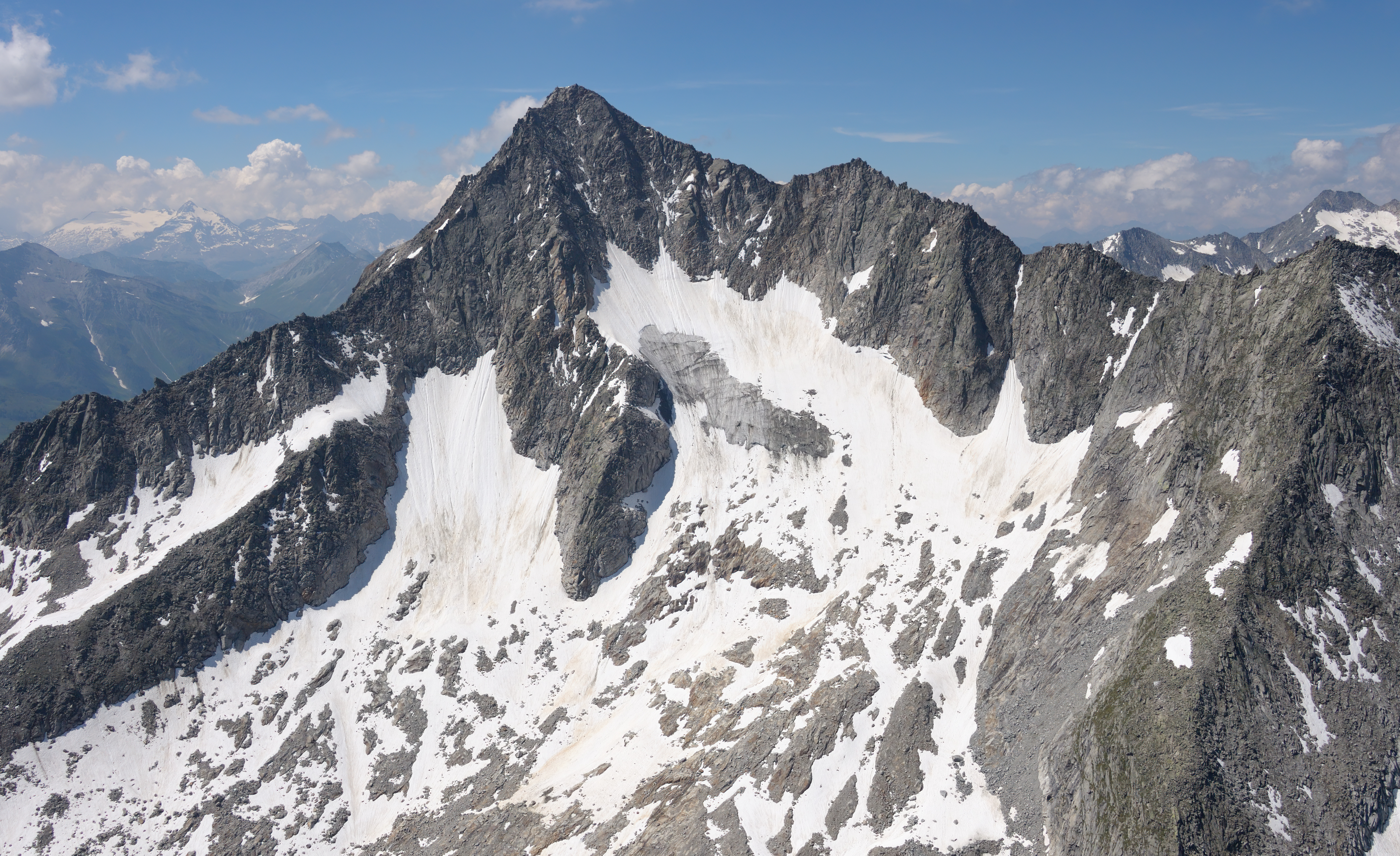
- Aerial view of Rauhkofel from the north

Highest point
- Elevation: 3,251 m (AA) (10,666 ft)
- Prominence: 3,251-2,658 m ↓ Heilig-Geist-Jöchl
- Isolation: 7.2 km → Reichenspitze
- Listing: Alpine mountains above 3000 m
- Coordinates: 47°04′33″N 12°05′30″E

Geography
- Location within Austria
- Location: Tyrol, Austria and South Tyrol, Italy
- Parent range: Zillertal Alps

Climbing
- First ascent: 1853 by two locals from Prettau
- Normal route: from Prettau via the Waldner See and south arête (grade I)

The Rauhkofel or Rauchkofel (3,251 m (AA), Italian: Monte Fumo) is a summit on the main crest of the Zillertal Alps, which forms the border between the Austrian state of Tyrol and the Italian province of South Tyrol. The name of the mountain ("rugged peak") comes from the rugged appearance of the granite blocks that form the summit . The Rauhkofel rises above its neighbouring peaks on the main Zillertal ridge considerably and it is considered the best lookout mountain in the eastern Zillertal Alps. The east and south arêtes of the Rauhkofel are part of the main crest of the Zillertal Alps. Another ridge runs from the summit heading northwest; on its continuation at a distance of just under two kilometres is the Kleinspitze (3,172 m). North of the summit are the remnants of the Rauhkofelkees glacier. At the southwestern foot of the peak is the Waldner See, the largest lake in the Ahrntal valley.

== Ascent ==
The summit is almost exclusively approached from the South Tyrolean side, but it is a very long climb. Around the turn of the 20th century the Lusatian Branch of the German and Austrian Alpine Club erected a hut south of the mountain and blazed a trail along the south arête. The hut has fallen into ruins, but parts of the trail have survived and form elements of the normal route today.

The most common route from Prettau in the Ahrntal runs via the Waldneralm and the Waldnersee to the south arête of the mountain. Here the climber can either walk from Kasern, the nearest village in the Ahrntal, via the Stadlalm and Marchsteinboden. At the southern spur of the mountain at a height of about 3,000 metres, the path ends and the route continues over coarse boulders and patches of snow, partly on the mountainside west of the arête, but it is waymarked to the summit. About 5 hours should be allowed for the ascent.

== Literature and maps ==
- Hanspaul Menara: Südtiroler Gipfelwanderungen. Athesia, Bozen, 2001, ISBN 88-8266-013-3
- Richard Goedeke: 3000er in den Nordalpen. Bruckmann, Munich, 2004, ISBN 3-7654-3930-4
- Eugen E. Hüsler: Tauferer Ahrntal mit Pfunderer Bergen. Bergverlag Rother, 3rd edn., Munich, 2009, ISBN 978-3-7633-4186-3
- Topografische Wanderkarte, Ahrntal / Rieserferner Gruppe, Sheet 035, 1:25,000, Casa Editrice Tabacco, ISBN 88-8315-035-X
