= Napfspitze =

Napfspitze may refer to various mountains in the Zillertal Alps in Austria and Italy:

- Napfspitze (Ahrntal) (3,144 m), also called the Dreiecketer
- Napfspitze (Schwaz) (2,925 m), a subpeak southwest of the Realspitze
- Napfspitze (Eisbruggjoch) (2,888 m)
