= Grabspitze =

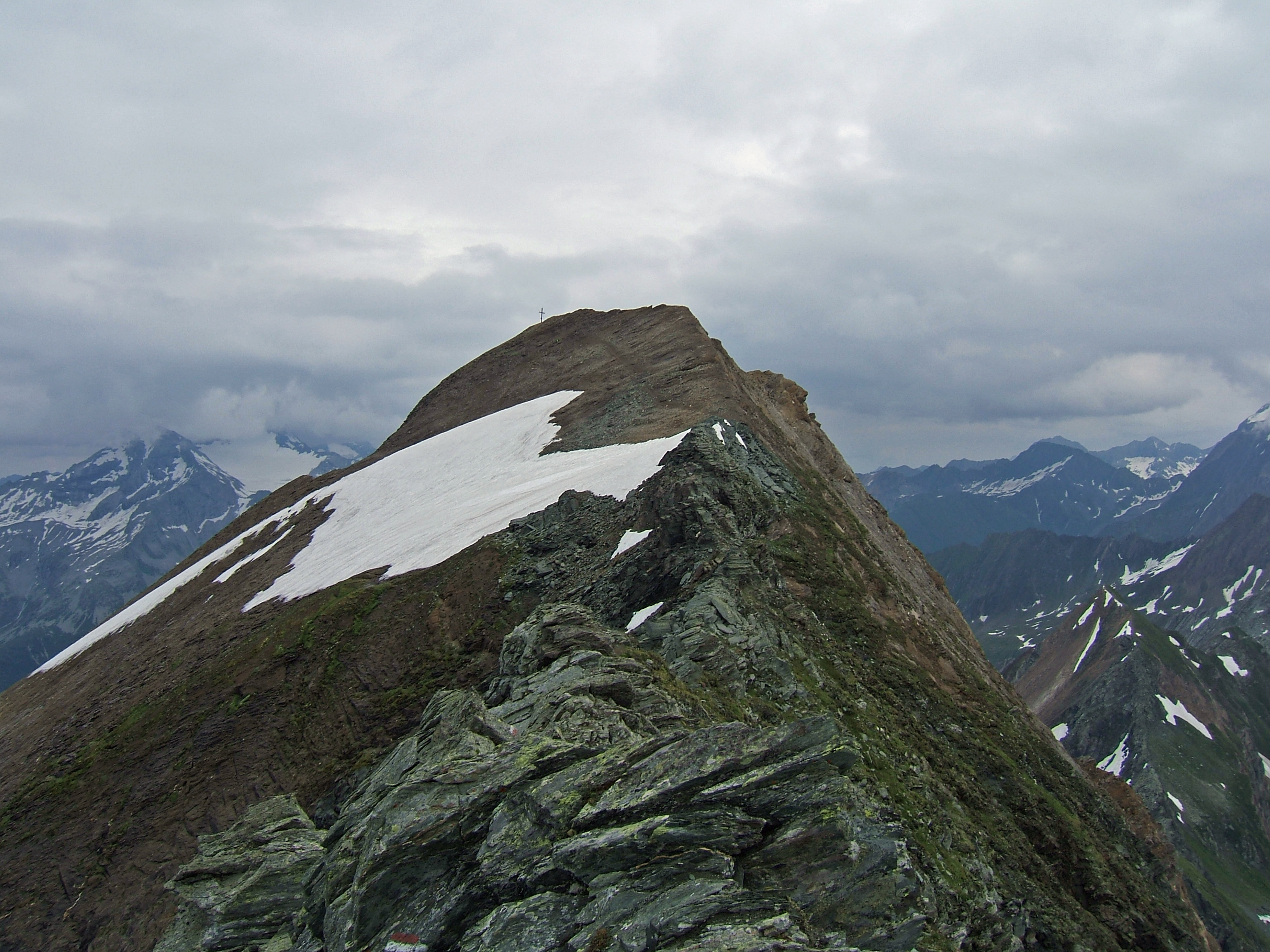
- Summit of the Grabspitze seen from its western subpeak

Highest point
- Elevation: 3,058 m s.l.m. (10,033 ft)
- Prominence: 428 m (1,404 ft)
- Listing: Alpine mountains above 3000 m
- Coordinates: 46°56′18″N 11°36′53″E

Geography
- Location within Italy
- Location: South Tyrol (Italy)
- Parent range: Zillertal Alps

Climbing
- Normal route: From the Pfitscher valley to the north, then along the western arête

The Grabspitze (3,062 m s.l.m., Italian: Cima Grava), formerly also called the Hochferner, is the second highest peak in the Pfunderer Mountains after the Wilde Kreuzspitze (3,135 m). The Pfunderer are a subrange of the Zillertal Alps located in the Italian province of South Tyrol. Its former name, "Hochferner", was derived from a firn field that lay to the side of the summit.

== Ascent ==
The easiest route starts from Platz (1,435 m) in the Pfitscher Tal valley and heads southwards part the small hamlet of Überwasser initially on the right hand side of the stream, climbing steeply through the forest. After the treeline the track continues to follow the Überwasserbach stream. At a height of about 2,600 m the route reaches a large basin from where the summit and its cross are visible. The path now turns, still rising steeply, in the direction of a notch on the west arête of the Grabspitze, which is reached at a height of about 2,780 m. The path along the western ridge is rather exposed in places and remains steep until the subpeak is gained. From there the route runs for a little way along the southern flank in an unremarkable ridge hollow near the summit. The last few metres make their way from there up the northern flank to the summit. The ascent from the Pfitscher valley needs about four to five hours. The path is mostly waymarked, but at various stream crossings the original waymarks are no longer recognisable due to high water. The Grabspitze is usually climbed in the new year as part of a ski tour; the ascent route largely following the marked path.

== Literature ==
- Hanspaul Menara: Die schönsten 3000er in Südtirol. Bildwanderbuch mit 70 Hochtouren. Athesia, Bozen, 2007, ISBN 978-88-8266-391-9
