= Napfspitze (Ahrntal) =

Mountain in Italy

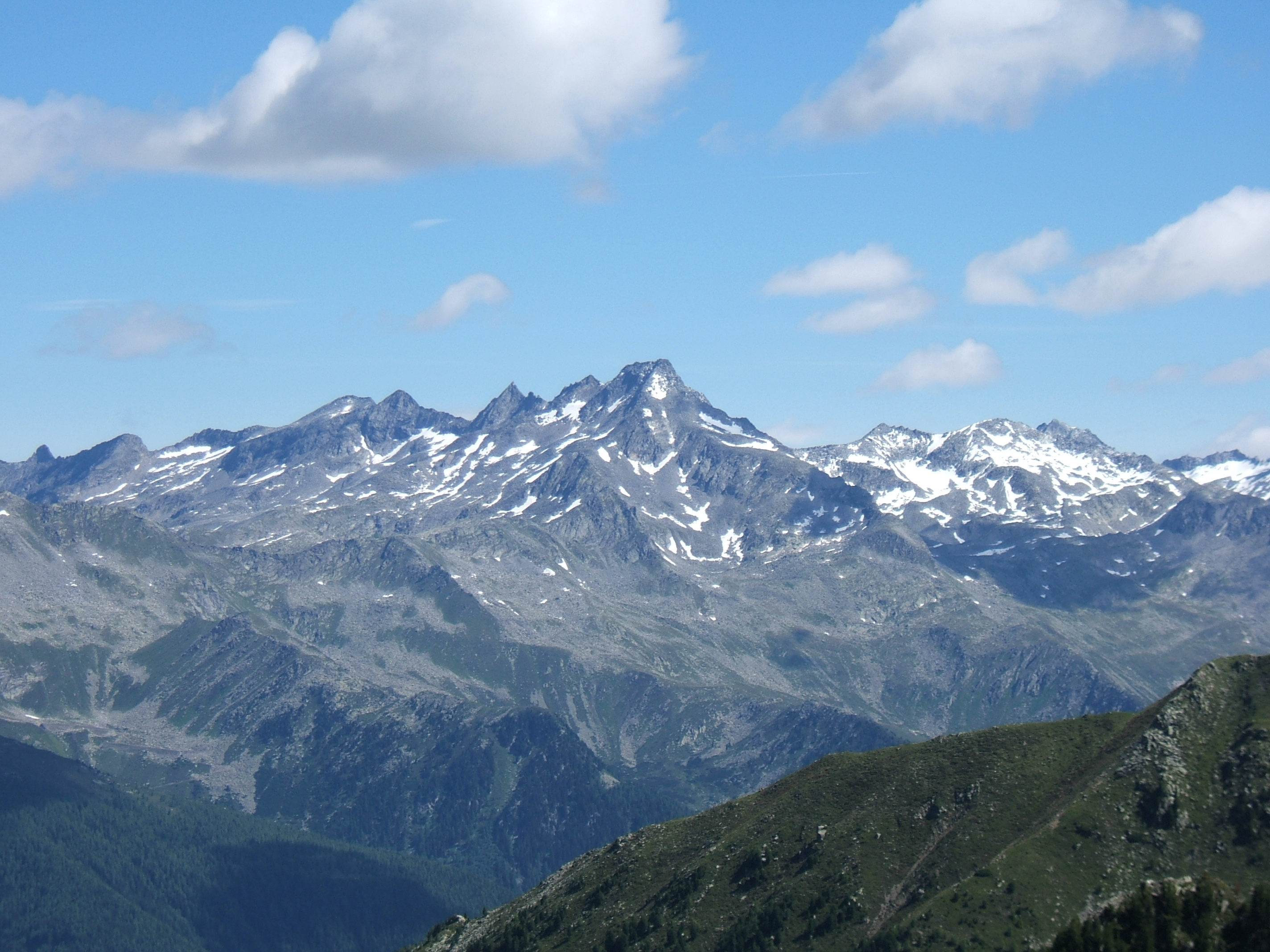
- The Napfspitze from the Obersteiner Holm to the southwest

Highest point
- Elevation: 3,144 m s.l.m. (10,315 ft)
- Prominence: 3,144-2,557 m ↓ Hundskehljoch
- Isolation: 4.2 km → Rauchkofel
- Listing: Alpine mountains above 3000 m
- Coordinates: 47°03′35″N 12°02′23″E

Geography
- Location within Italy
- Location: Tyrol, Austria und South Tyrol, Italy
- Parent range: Zillertal Alps

Climbing
- First ascent: 1880 by R. Seyerlein and St. Kirchner
- Normal route: from the Zillergrund to the north through the Sundergrund bottom, then from the west to the summit (UIAA grade I).

The Napfspitze (3,144 m s.l.m., also called the Dreiecketer, Italian: Cima Cadini), is a peak on the main chain of the Zillertal Alps and on the border between the Austrian federal state of Tyrol and the Italian province of South Tyrol.

== Geography ==
The Napfspitze lies north of St. Peter in the Tauferer Ahrntal valley and south of the Zillergrund bottom. The long ridge of Riblerkamm branches from the main chain of the Zillertal Alps at the Napfspitze heading in a northerly direction. Along the ridge are two more peaks that exceed 3,000 metres in height: an unnamed 3,103-metre-summit and, further south, the Hohe Warte at 3,095 metres. On the northeastern side of the Napfspitze lies a small glacier, the Grießbachjochkees.

== First ascent ==
The mountain was first climbed by R. Seyerlein and St. Kirchner in the year 1880; they reached the summit via the southern arête.

== Ascent options ==
The normal route runs from the Zillergrund to the north of the Napfspitze, beginning from the inn on the water meadows. Initially, it heads south towards Mitterjoch through the Sundergrund bottom. It then forks off this road at the upper level beneath the col called the Oberlangleben. It then continues, trackless and unmarked, over extensive, boulder-strewn mountainside to the summit area. There, the route makes its way up gullies to the summit block and continues up climb steep, heavily fissured rocks to the summit itself (UIAA scale I). Five to seven hours are needed for this long climb.

Alternatively, the Napfspitze can be scaled from the St. Peter im Ahrntal to the south. One option is the long south ridge (UIAA grade II). Another variant is the waymarked trail to the lake of Grießbachsee, which then climbs tracklessly from there to the Grießbachjöchl col and finally crosses the east ridge to the summit (UIAA scale I).

== Literature and maps ==
- Richard Goedeke: 3000er in den Nordalpen. Bruckmann, Munich, 2004, ISBN 3-7654-3930-4
- Topographic walking map, Ahrntal / Rieserferner Gruppe, Sheet 035, 1:25,000, Casa Editrice Tabacco, ISBN 88-8315-035-X
