= Wildkarspitze (Zillertal Alps) =

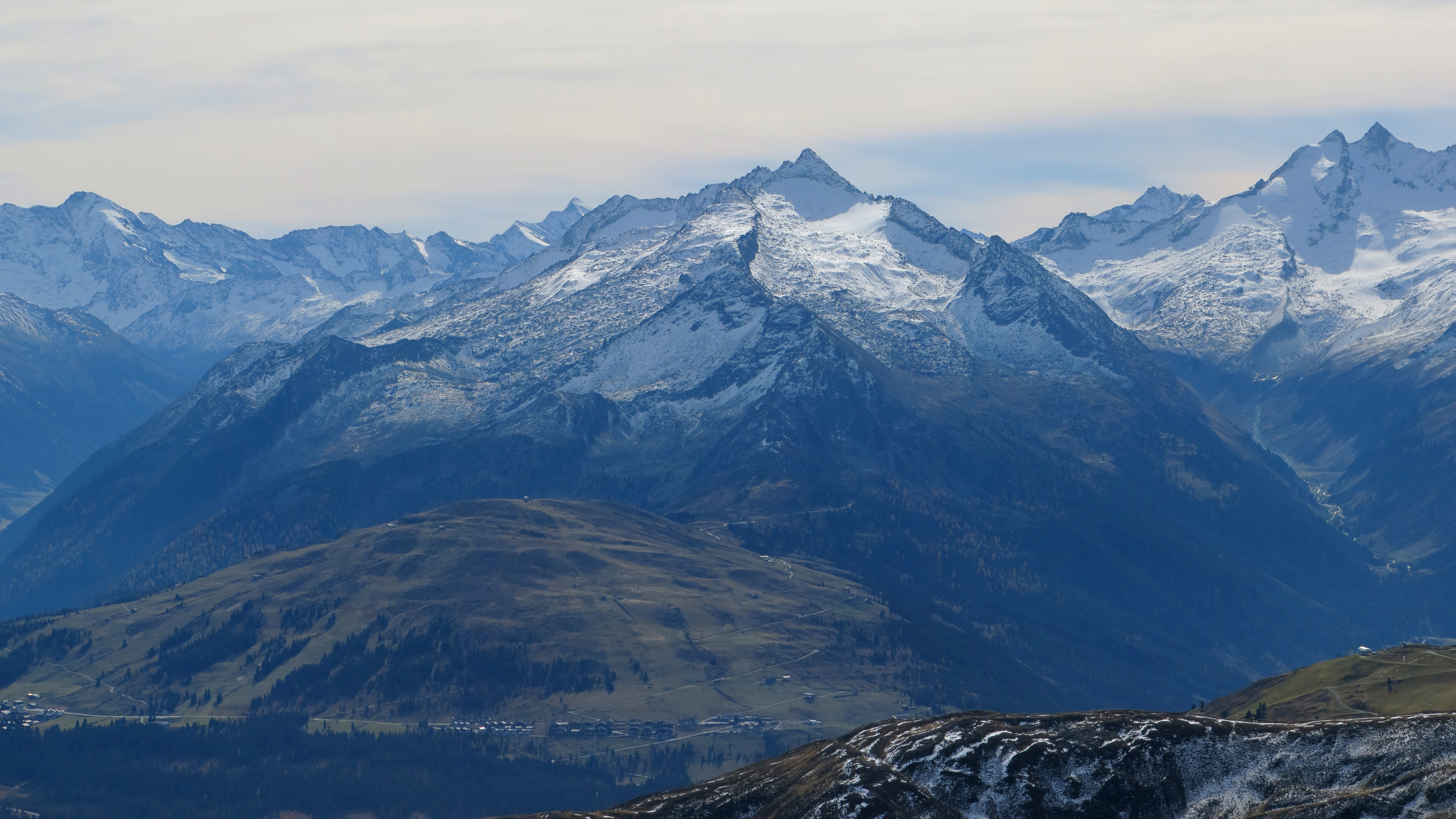
- The Wildkarspitze from the north

Highest point
- Elevation: 3,073 m (AA) (10,082 ft)
- Prominence: 384 m ↓ Rosskarscharte
- Isolation: 3.8 km → Reichenspitze
- Listing: Alpine mountains above 3000 m
- Coordinates: 47°10′23″N 12°08′21″E

Geography
- Location within Austria
- Location: Salzburg, Austria
- Parent range: Reichenspitze Group, Zillertal Alps

The Wildkarspitze is a mountain, 3,073 m (AA), in the Zillertal Alps in the Austrian state of Salzburg.

== Location and surrounding area ==
The Wildkarspitze rises on the municipal territory of Krimml in the Pinzgau. It is the highest summit on the Gerloskamm, a north-south running ridge in the Reichenspitze Group, which forms the eastern boundary of the Zillertal Alps. To the west of the mountain is the valley of Wildgerlostal, to the east that of the Krimmler Achental.

Whilst the western mountainside of the Wildkarspitze has a rocky character, the northern and eastern sides are heavily glaciated. To the north is the glacier of Wildkarkees, to the northeast, the Waldbergkarkees, and to the southeast, the Weißkarkees. The neighbouring peaks are the less prominent Seekarspitzl (also Walderbergkarkopf, 2,914 m) to the northeast and the Hoher Schaflkopf (3,057 m) to the south.

== Alpinism ==
The normal route up the Wildkarspitze runs tracklessly from the Zittauer Hut (2,330 m) to the southwest up to the arête between Wildkarspitze and Hoher Schaflkopf and then along it to the summit. This ascent requires climbing to UIAA grade II level. Another just as difficult route, which is accessible from the Wildgerlostal or from Krimml, runs across the Waldbergkarkees glacier, then over the Wildkarkees and finally along the northwest ridge to the top. In winter the mountain is climbed as a ski tour across the Wildkarkees.

The first ascent of the mountain, then called the Wildkarkopf, was undertaken by Karl Povinelli and Franz Hofer in 1892.
