= Wildkarspitze =

Several mountains in Austria bear the name Wildkarspitze:

- Wildkarspitze (Zillertal Alps) (3,076 m above sea level (AA)), a mountain in the Zillertal Alps of Salzburg state
- Wildkarspitze (Stubai Alps) (3,173 m above sea level (AA)), a mountain in the Stubai Alps of Tyrol
- Wildkarspitze (Kitzbühel Alps) (1,961 m above sea level (AA)), a mountain in the Kitzbühel Alps of Tyrol
