= Tauferer Ahrntal =

Valley in South Tyrol, Italy

Coordinates: 46°55′N 11°57′E

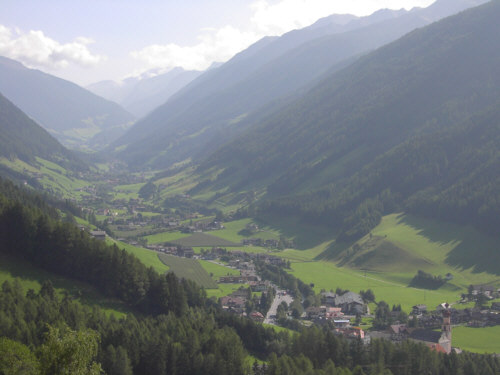
Ahrntal

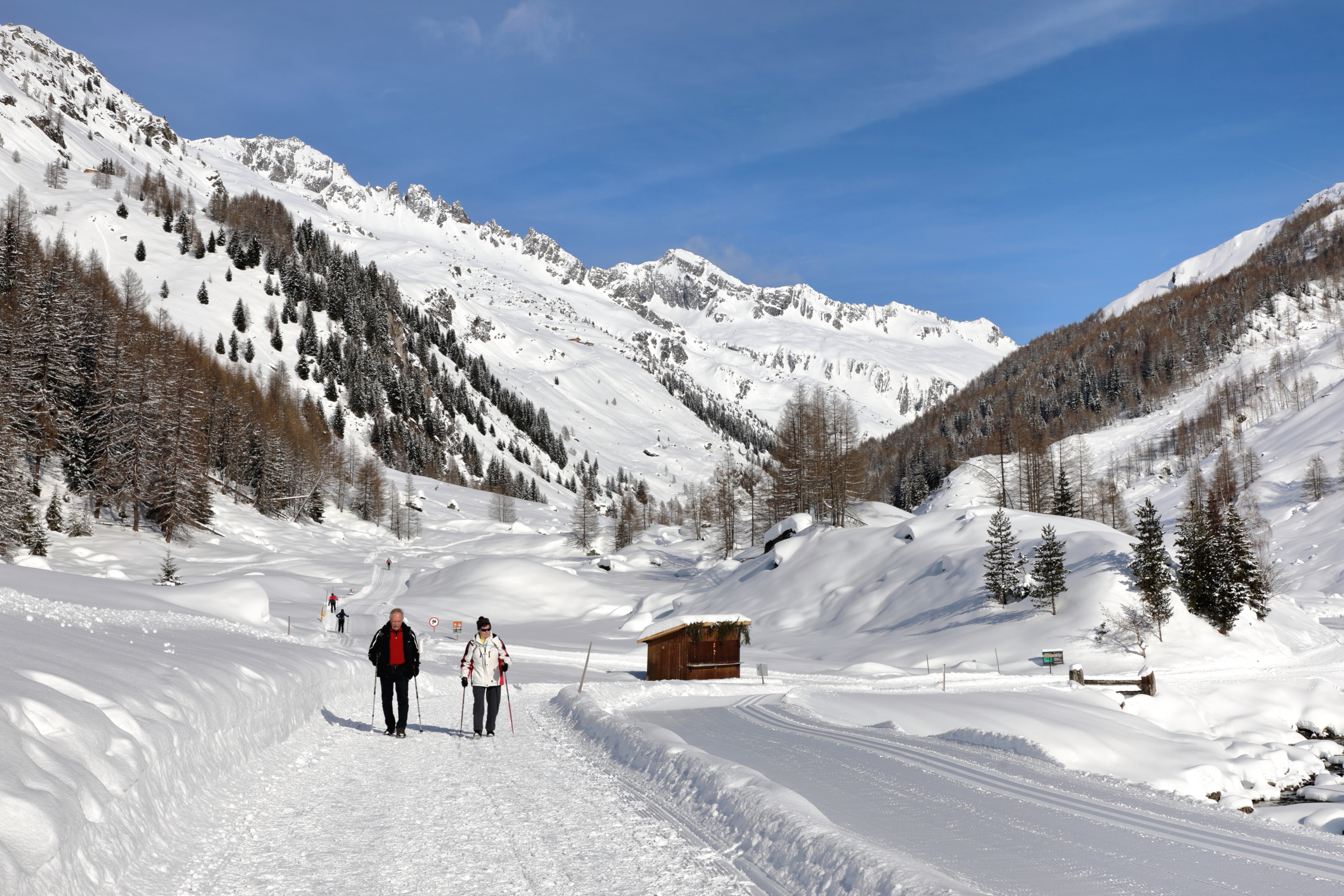
The rear part of the Ahrntal in winter

The Tauferer Ahrntal denotes the valley of the Ahr (Italian: Aurino) River, a tributary valley of the Puster Valley in South Tyrol, Italy. It is commonly divided into the Tauferer Tal (Val di Tures), stretching from the confluence with the Rienz River near Bruneck up to Sand in Taufers, and the Ahrntal (Valle Aurina) proper up to the source in Prettau.

== Geography ==
The valley in the Central Eastern Alps forms the northeasternmost part of South Tyrol close to the Austrian border, separating the Zillertal Alps in the north and west from the Hohe Tauern range (Rieserferner Group) in the south and east. The municipalities in the valley are Gais, Sand in Taufers, Ahrntal, and Prettau, the northernmost comune of Italy. The municipality of Mühlwald is congruent with a northwestern side valley of the Tauferer Ahrntal including the Neves Reservoir. In the southeast, the Reinbach stream joins the Ahr near Sand in Taufers; the area around the village of Rein in Taufers is part of the Rieserferner-Ahrn Nature Park nature reserve.

The valley is accessible by the state highway that runs from Bruneck northwards to Gais and Sand in Taufers where the entry into the Ahr ravine is marked by Taufers Castle. From here the valley stretches northeastwards up the river course to Prettau and the Birnlücke Pass. The former Taufers Railway connection from Bruneck to Sand in Taufers was discontinued in 1957.
