= III. Hornspitze =

Mountain in Italy

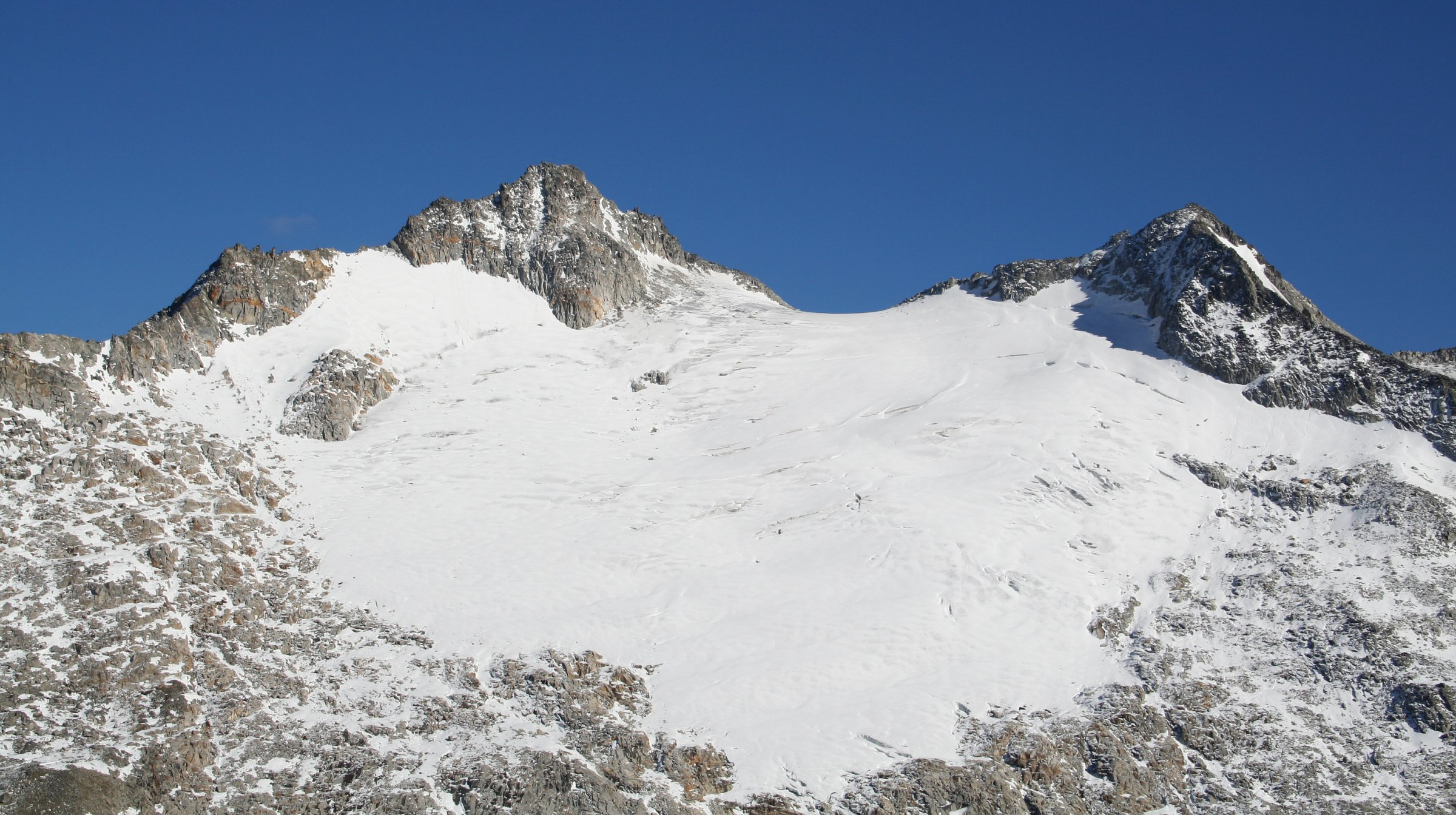

Highest point
- Elevation: 3,253 m (10,673 ft)
- Coordinates: 47°00′13″N 11°50′38″E

Geography
- Location: Tyrol, Austria / South Tyrol, Italy
- Parent range: Zillertal Alps

Climbing
- First ascent: 4 September 1874 by Josef and Karl Daimer, Stephan Kirchler

The III. Hornspitze is a mountain in the Zillertal Alps on the border between Tyrol, Austria, and South Tyrol, Italy.
