= Hochfernerspitze =

Mountain in Italy

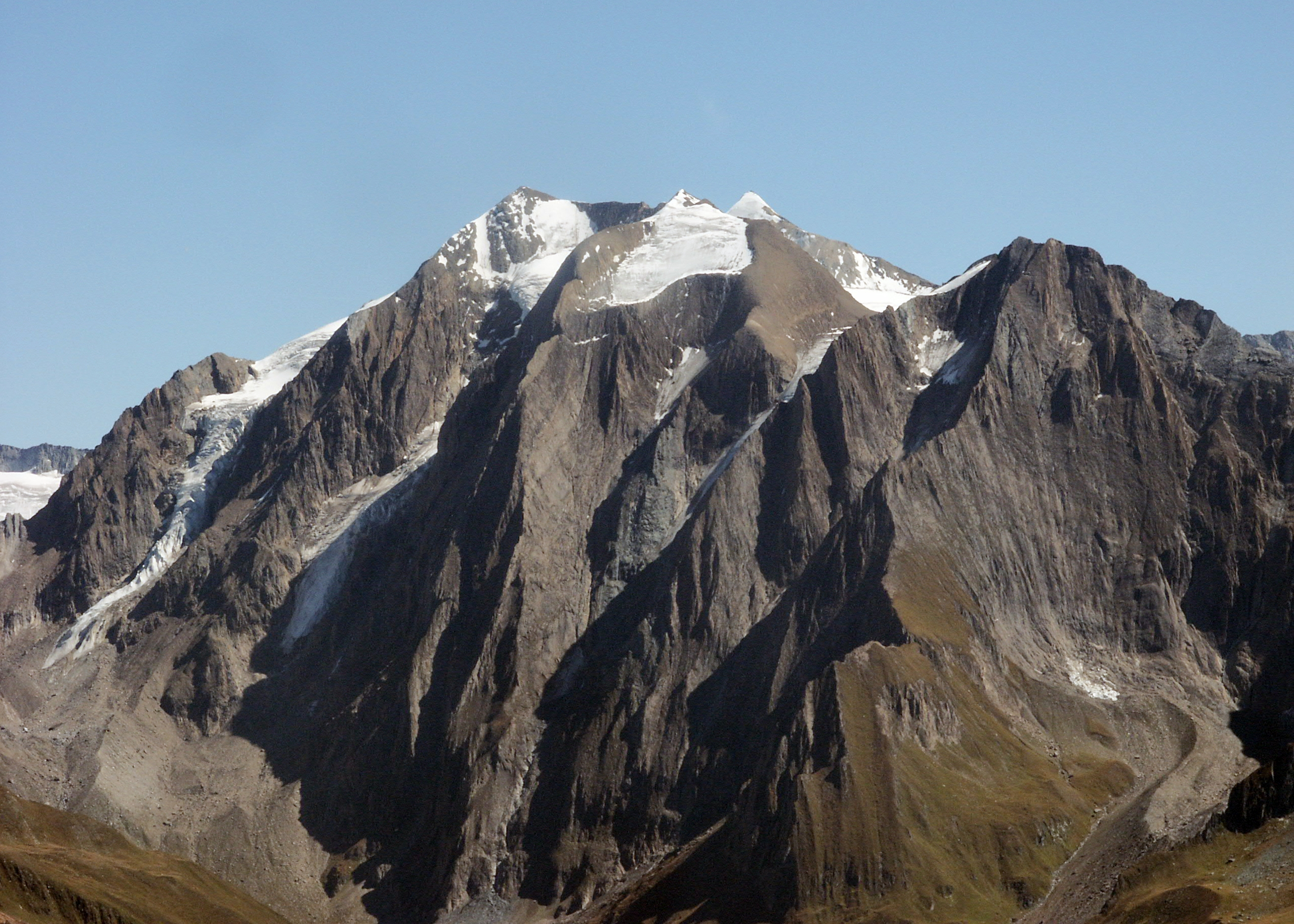

Highest point
- Elevation: 3,463 m (11,362 ft)
- Coordinates: 46°58′44″N 11°43′1″E

Geography
- Location: South Tyrol, Italy
- Parent range: Zillertal Alps

Climbing
- First ascent: 1875 by Victor Hecht and J. Maierhofer

The Hochfernerspitze is a mountain in the Zillertal Alps in South Tyrol, Italy.
