= Reichenspitze =

Mountain in Austria

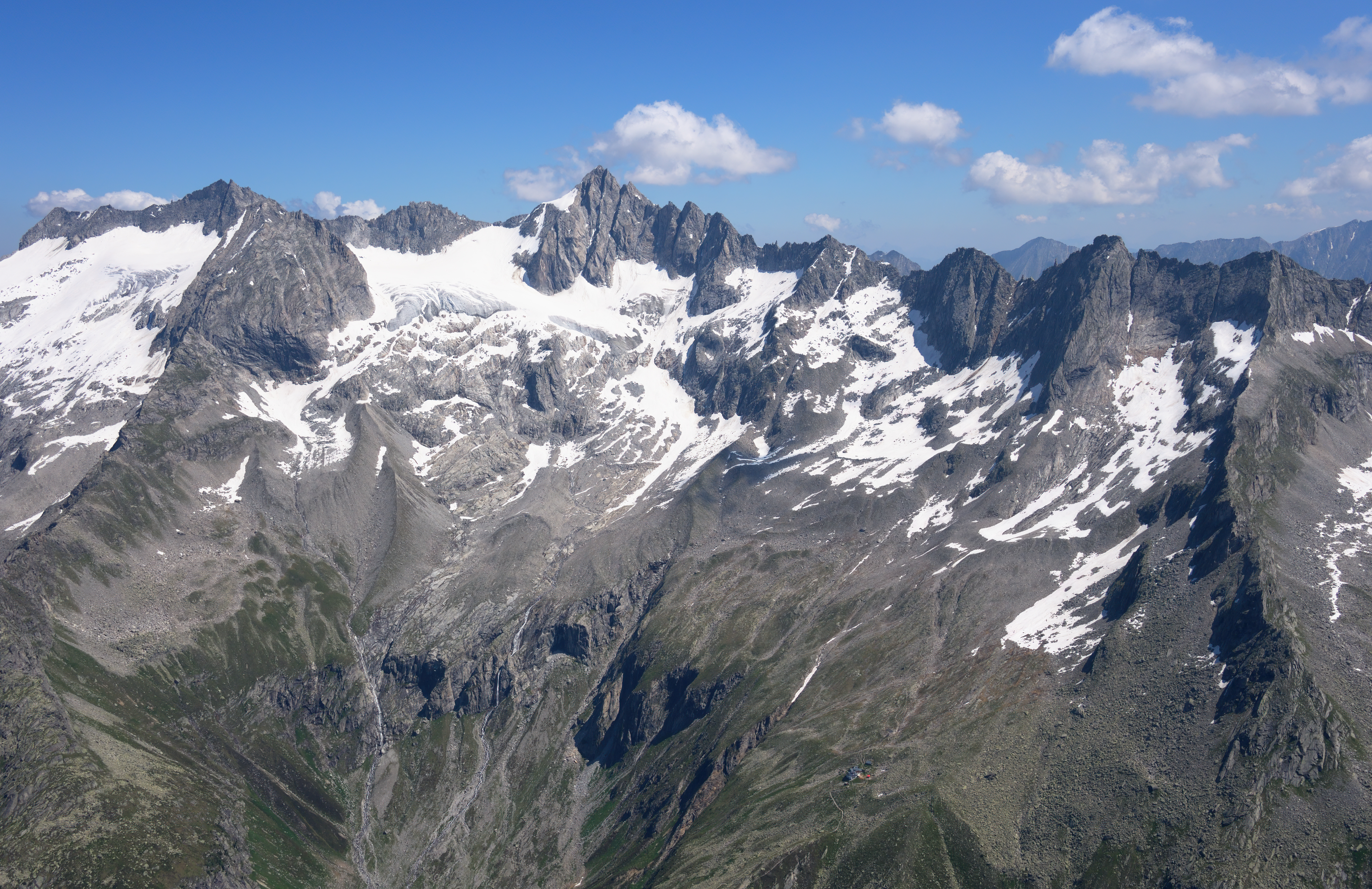
- The Reichenspitze, the highest peak in the Reichenspitze Group

Highest point
- Elevation: 3,303 m (AA) (10,837 ft)
- Prominence: 3,303-2,620 m ↓ Schütttaler Joch
- Isolation: 12.2 km → Dreiherrnspitze
- Listing: Alpine mountains above 3000 m
- Coordinates: 47°08′21″N 12°06′38″E

Geography
- Location within Austria
- Location: Salzburg and Tyrol, Austria
- Parent range: Reichenspitze Group, Zillertal Alps

Climbing
- First ascent: 1856 by a farmer from Prettau

The Reichenspitze is a mountain, 3,303 m (AA), in the eastern Zillertal Alps on the border between the Austrian states of Salzburg and Tyrol. It is the highest peak of the range named after it, the Reichenspitze Group, and offers good, all-round views. Its neighbouring peaks, all linked by arêtes, are the 3,263-metre-high Gabler to the northeast, the Richterspitze (3,052 m) to the south and the 3,278-metre-high Wildgerlosspitze to the northwest.

== First ascent ==
The mountain was first ascended in 1856 by a farmer from Prettau in the valley of Tauferer Ahrntal, whose name has been lost. He climbed from the southeast up the east face, a route that, today, is assessed near the summit as climbing grade UIAA III. The first touristic ascent took place on 16 July 1865 by Peter Haller from Gmünd and foresters, Anton Peer and Josef Unterrainer of Schönachtal.

== Routes ==
An ascent of the summit may be launched from the Plauener Hut (2,373 m), the Richter Hut (2,374 m) or the Zittauer Hut (2,328 m).

== Literature and maps ==
- Heinrich Klier and Walter Klier: Alpine Club Guide Zillertaler Alpen, Munich, 1990, ISBN 3-7633-1201-3
- Alpine Club Map 1:25,000. Sheet 35/3, Zillertaler Alpen, Ost
