= Ahr (South Tyrol) =

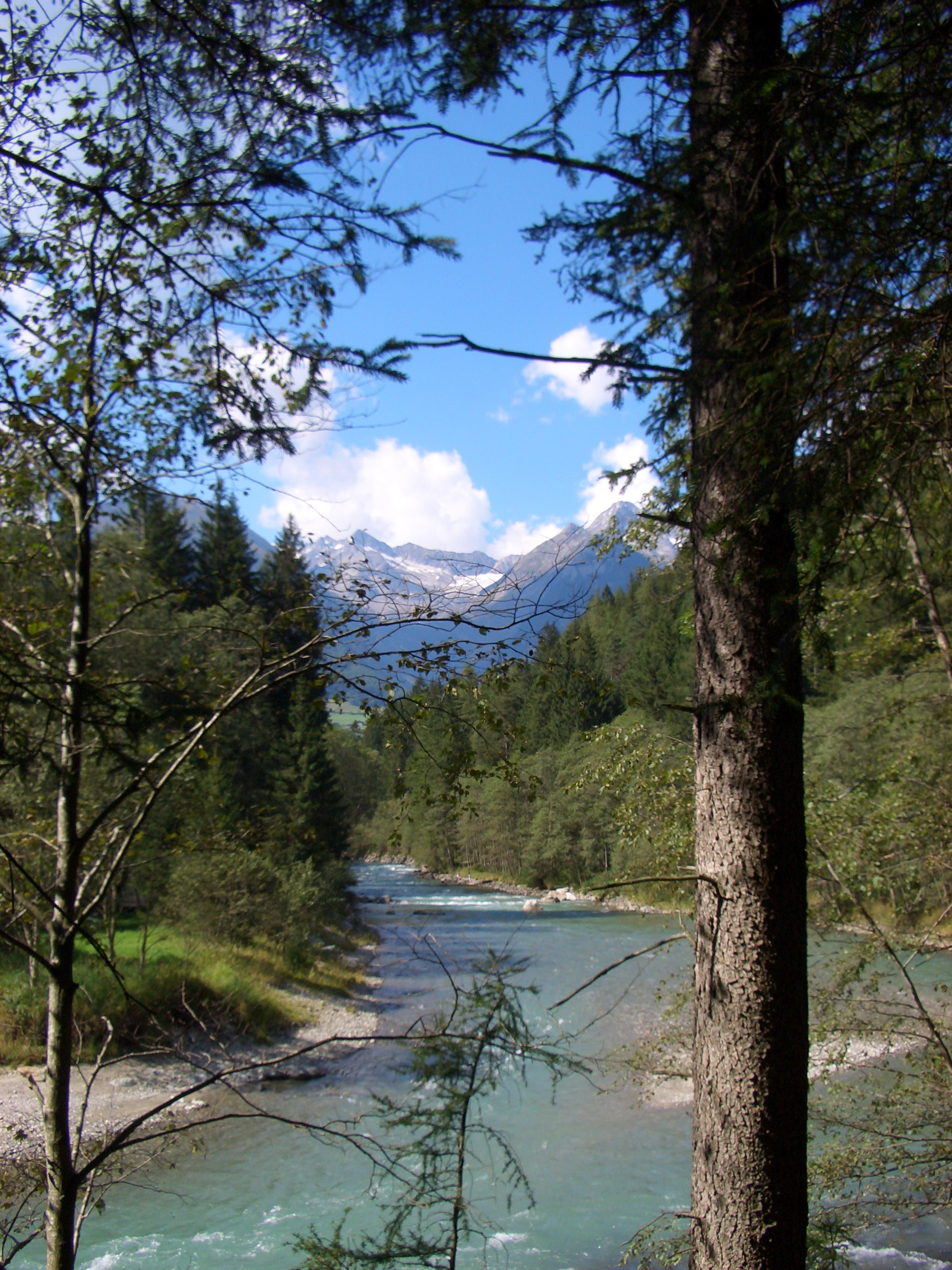
- Ahr between Luttach and Sand in Taufers

Location
- Country: Italy

Physical characteristics
- Source
  - location: Below the Birnlücke pass, South Tyrol, Italy
  - coordinates: 47°4′36″N 12°12′29″E
- Mouth: Rienz
  - location: near Bruneck, South Tyrol, Italy
  - coordinates: 46°47′36″N 11°55′22″E
  - elevation: 815 m (2,674 ft)
- Length: 50.3 km (31.3 mi)
- Basin size: 629 km^{2} (243 sq mi)

Basin features
- Progression: Rienz→ Eisack→ Adige→ Adriatic Sea
- Tributaries
  - left: Reinbach

The Ahr (German pronunciation: [aːɐ̯]; Italian: Aurino [auˈriːno]) is a river in South Tyrol, Italy, which flows through the Tauferer Ahrntal.
