= Hoher Weißzint =

Mountain in Italy

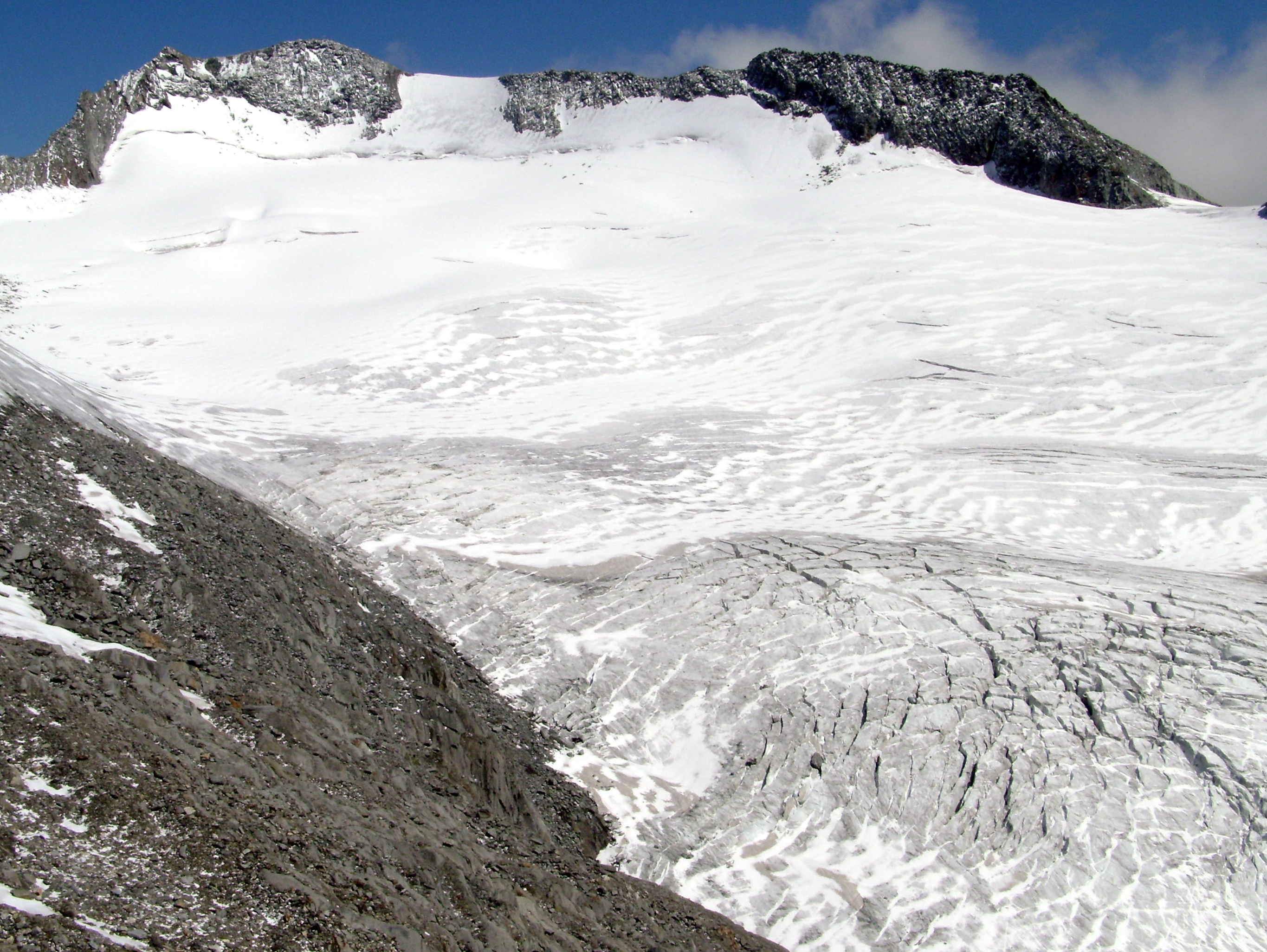

Highest point
- Elevation: 3,371 m (11,060 ft)
- Coordinates: 46°58′8″N 11°44′49″E

Geography
- Location: Tyrol, Austria / South Tyrol, Italy
- Parent range: Zillertal Alps

Climbing
- First ascent: 8 August 1871 by Erich Künigl and a peasant from Lappach

The Hoher Weißzint (Italian: Punta Bianca; German: Hoher Weißzint) is a mountain in the Zillertal Alps on the border between Tyrol, Austria, and South Tyrol, Italy.
