= Reinbach =

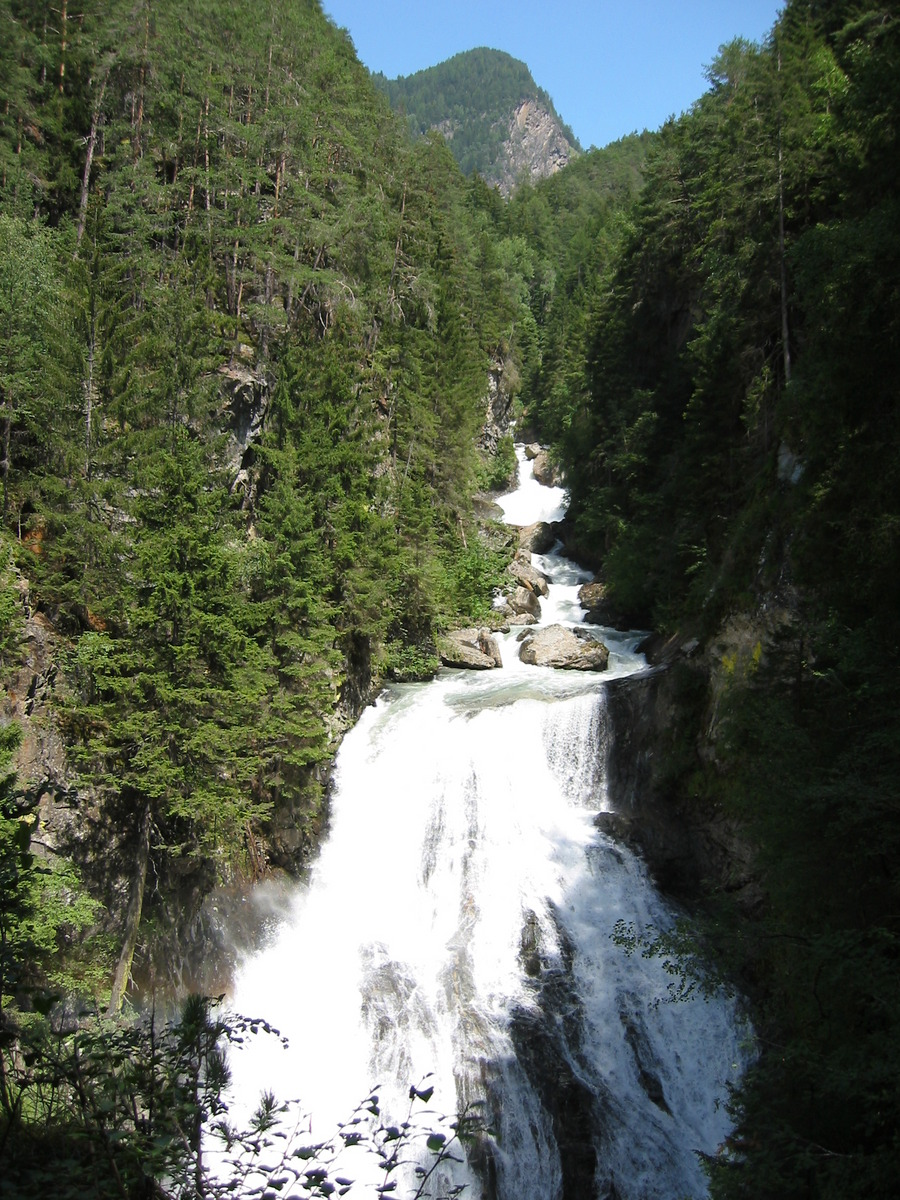

Physical characteristics
- Source
  - location: Above Rein in Taufers (South Tyrol)
- Mouth: Ahr at Sand in Taufers
  - coordinates: 46.9139°N 11.9646°E

Basin features
- Progression: Ahr→ Rienz→ Eisack→ Adige→ Adriatic Sea

The Reinbach is a stream in South Tyrol, Italy, known as the Rio di Riva in Italian. It flows into the Ahr in Sand in Taufers. It has three waterfalls, two 50 metres (160 ft) high, and one 10 metres (33 ft) high, all located in the Rieserferner-Ahrn Nature Park. The river is also a popular kayaking spot.
