= Luttach =

Italian village

Coordinates: 46°57′N 11°55′E

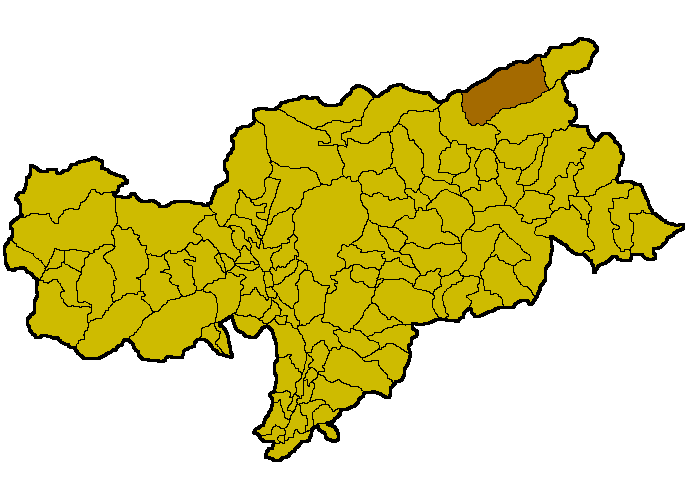
Map of South Tyrol showing Ahrntal.

Luttach (Italian: Lutago) is a mountain village in northern Italy. It is a frazione of the comune of Ahrntal in South Tyrol.

It is a popular tourist destination in all seasons and boasts several hotels, as well as numerous shops and an indoor swimming pool. Hiking and rafting on the river Ahr are on offer during the summer months, while the two nearby ski areas of Klausberg and Speikboden cater to winter sports enthusiasts.

== Geography ==
It nestles in the crease of a sharp alpine valley, at an elevation of some 970 m above sea level.

== History ==
Among the beautiful traditional buildings, the Church of St. Sebastian occupies a prominent place on a rise overlooking the town. Its charming cemetery features a number of wrought-iron crosses by the artisan blacksmith Jakob Pareiner.

== Famous residents ==
The town is also associated with the renowned journalist Vinzenz Oberhollenzer, who has written a great deal about his native valley. The British novelist Tim Parks set his story Cleaver (2006) in the surroundings of Luttach. The Italian tennis player Karin Knapp has her residence in Luttach.
