= Birnlücke =

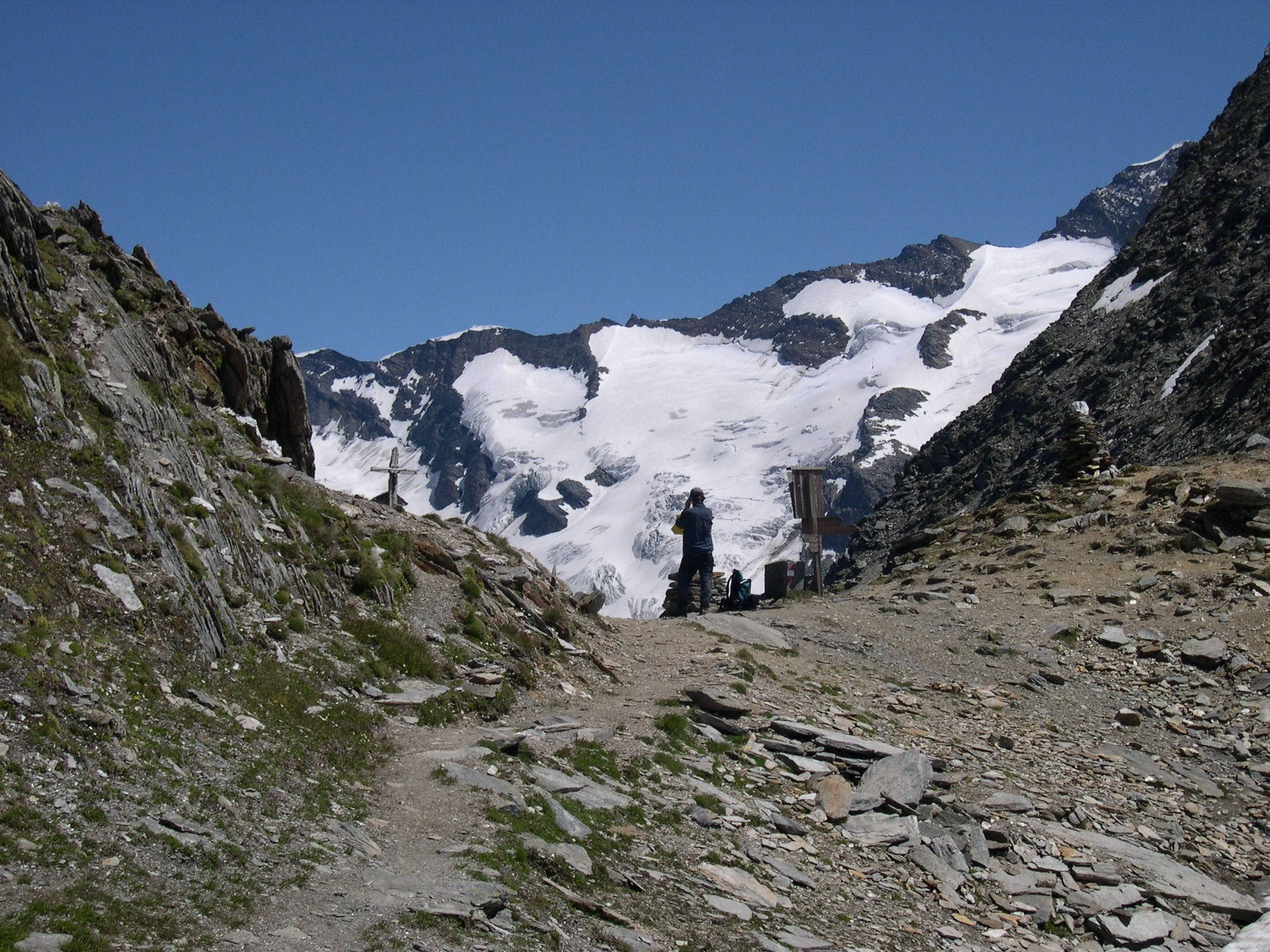
- The Birnlücke from Italy looking towards Krimmler Kees in Tyrol
- Interactive map of Birnlücke
- Elevation: 2,665 m (8,743 ft)
- Traversed by: Saumpfad

Third Approach
- Location: Salzburg, Austria; Südtirol, Italy
- Range: Venediger Group, Zillertal Alps
- Coordinates: 47°05′12.84″N 12°13′05.64″E

The Birnlücke (2,665 m (AA)) is the border pass at the western end of the Hohe Tauern mountains in Austria, between the Venediger Group and the adjoining Zillertal Alps. The border between Austria and Italy has run over the pass since 1919. The pass forms the border between the Austrian state of Salzburg and the Italian province of South Tyrol, the valleys of the Krimmler Achental and Ahrntal, and the Rieserferner-Ahrn Nature Park and Hohe Tauern National Park.

Until the Schengen Agreement there used to be a regular border checkpoint at Krimmler Tauern (2,634 metres [8,642 ft]).

Not far south of the border crossing at 2,441 m s.l.m. is the Birnlücken Hut (Rifugio Tridentina). It was built in 1900 and named after the pass.

== Name ==
The name Birnlücke is a corruption of the old spelling. As late as 1888 the pass was called Pyrlücke, after the old names for the stream, the Pirra or Birlbach, in the Ahrn valley. The Italian name is Forcella del Picco.

== See also ==
- List of mountain passes
