= Turnerkamp =

Mountain in Italy

Turnerkamp/Cima di Campo
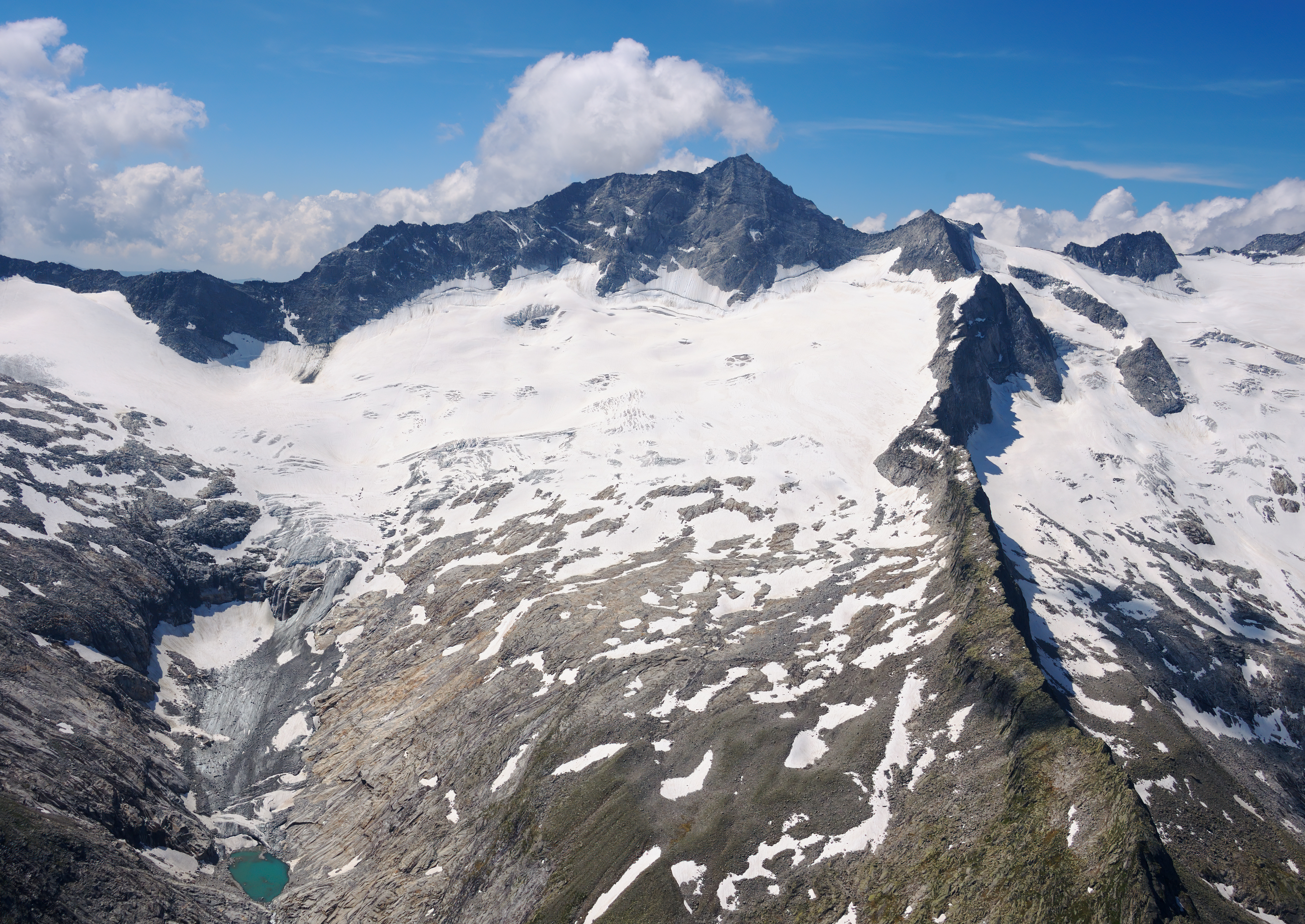

Highest point
- Elevation: 3,418 m (11,214 ft)
- Coordinates: 46°59′26″N 11°48′33″E

Geography
- Location: Tyrol, Austria / South Tyrol, Italy
- Parent range: Zillertal Alps

Climbing
- First ascent: In the 1860s by Johann Kirchler from Luttach (not clearly provable), or in 1872 by W. H. Hudson, C. Taylor and R. Pendlebury

The Turnerkamp (Italian: Cima di Campo) is a mountain in the Zillertal Alps on the border between Tyrol, Austria, and South Tyrol, Italy.
