= Wollbachspitze =

Mountain in Italy

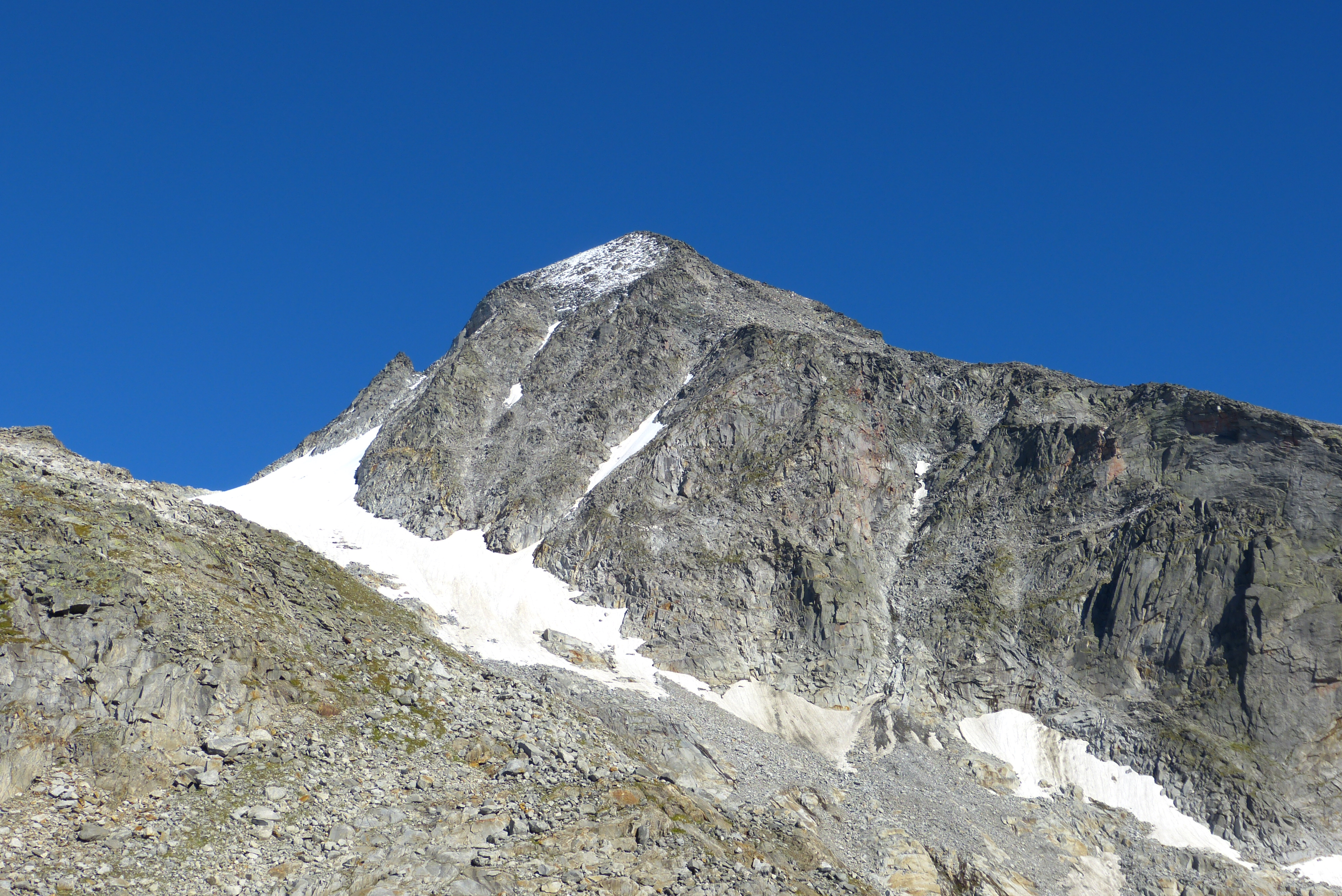
- Wollbachspitze seen from the Eastern Stillupkees.

Highest point
- Elevation: 3,210 m (10,530 ft)
- Coordinates: 47°2′58″N 11°58′46″E

Geography
- Location within Austria
- Location: Tyrol, Austria / South Tyrol, Italy
- Parent range: Zillertal Alps

Climbing
- First ascent: 1852 during a survey

The Wollbachspitze is a mountain in the Zillertal Alps on the border between Tyrol, Austria, and South Tyrol, Italy.
