= Schwarzenstein (Zillertal Alps) =

Mountain in Italy

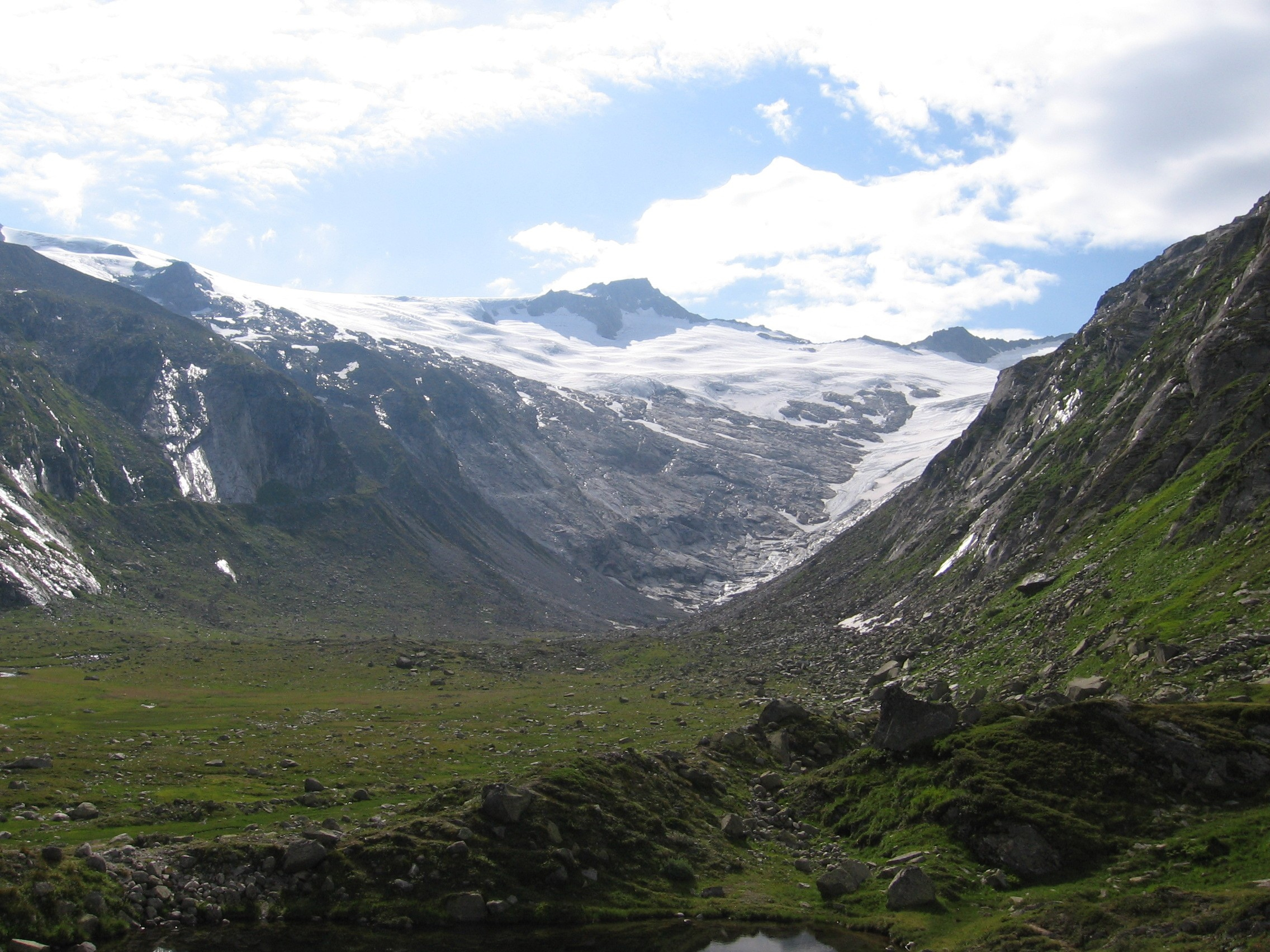

Highest point
- Elevation: 3,368 m (11,050 ft)
- Listing: Alpine mountains above 3000 m
- Coordinates: 47°1′N 11°52′E

Geography
- Location: Tyrol, Austria / South Tyrol, Italy
- Parent range: Zillertal Alps

Climbing
- First ascent: 1852 by Lieutenant Langer; 1858 by Anton von Ruthner, J. Daum, L.v. Barth and Georg Samer

The Schwarzenstein (Italian: Sasso Nero; German: Schwarzenstein) is a mountain in the Zillertal Alps on the border between Tyrol, Austria, and South Tyrol, Italy.
