= Hochfeiler =

Mountain in Italy

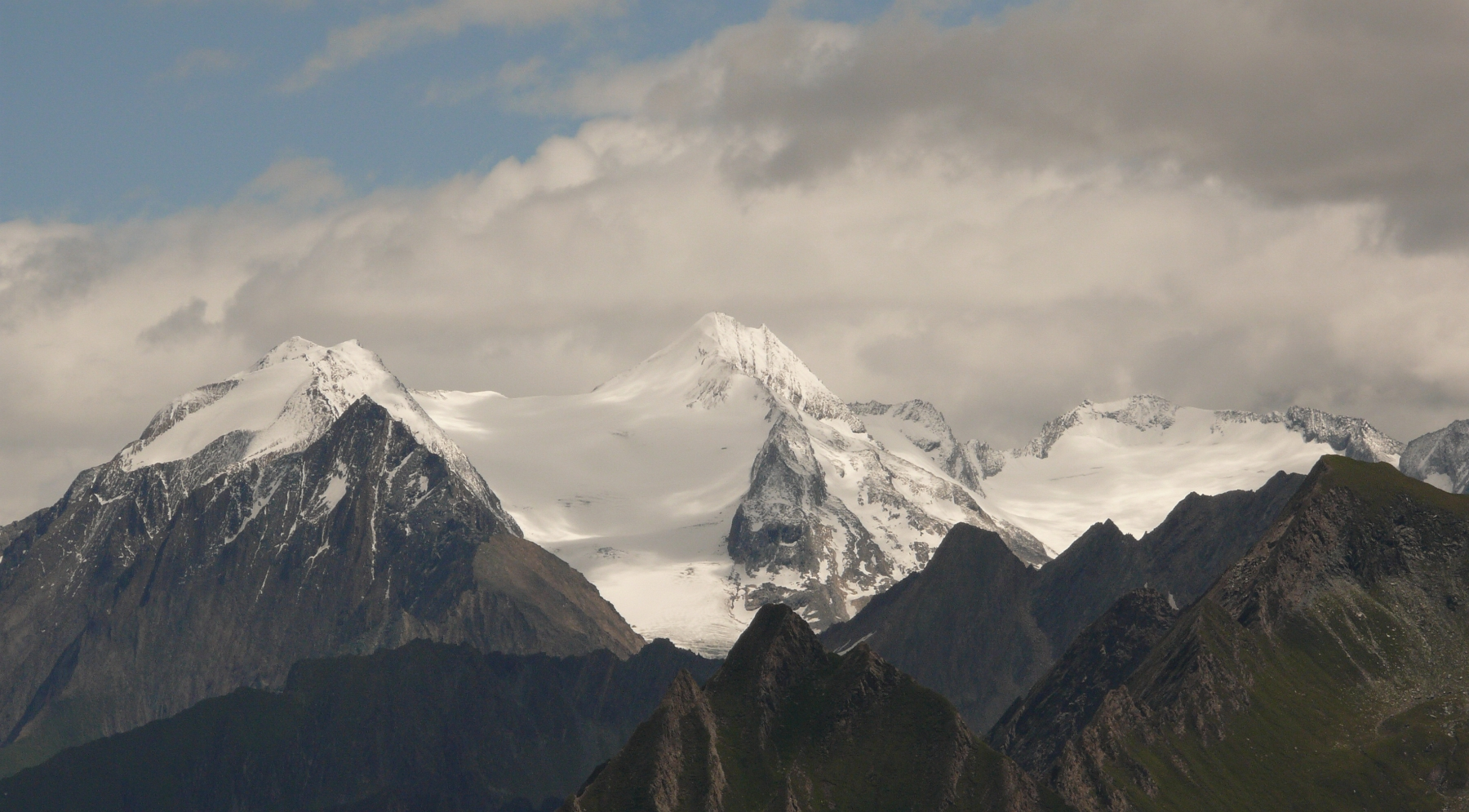

Highest point
- Elevation: 3,510 m (11,520 ft)
- Prominence: 981
- Listing: Alpine mountains above 3000 m
- Coordinates: 46°58′22″N 11°43′34″E

Geography
- Location within Alps Location within Austria Location within Italy
- Location: Tyrol, Austria / South Tyrol, Italy
- Parent range: Zillertal Alps

Climbing
- First ascent: 24 July 1865 by Paul Grohmann, Georg Samer and Peter Fuchs

The Hochfeiler (Italian: Gran Pilastro; German: Hochfeiler) is a mountain, 3,510 metres high, and the highest peak in the Zillertal Alps on the border between Tyrol, Austria, and South Tyrol, Italy.

== The normal route to the summit ==
Hochfeiler (Gran Pilastro) is at the Austrian-Italian border. The Austrian side of the mountain is completely under glacier. The normal south route from the Italian side is usually snow-free during the summer.
