= Wilde Kreuzspitze =

Mountain in Italy

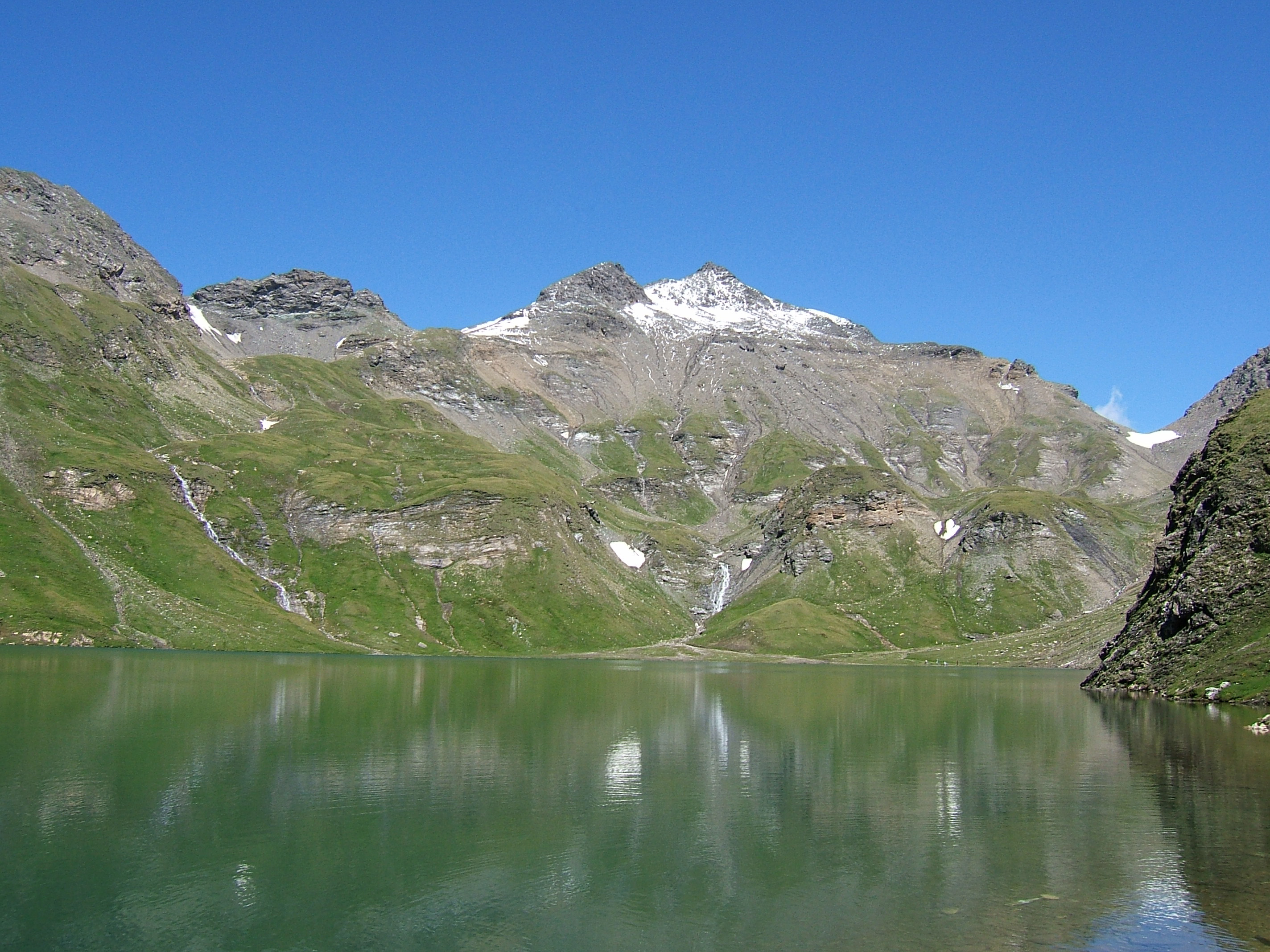

Highest point
- Elevation: 3,134 m (10,282 ft)
- Prominence: 564 m (1,850 ft)
- Listing: Alpine mountains above 3000 m
- Coordinates: 46°54′51″N 11°35′40″E

Geography
- Location within Italy
- Location: South Tyrol, Italy
- Parent range: Zillertal Alps

Climbing
- First ascent: 1861 by A. v. Ruthner and the peasant Peterer

The Wilde Kreuzspitze (Italian: Picco della Croce) is a mountain in the Zillertal Alps in South Tyrol, Italy.
