= Großer Löffler =

Mountain in Italy

- Monte Lovello
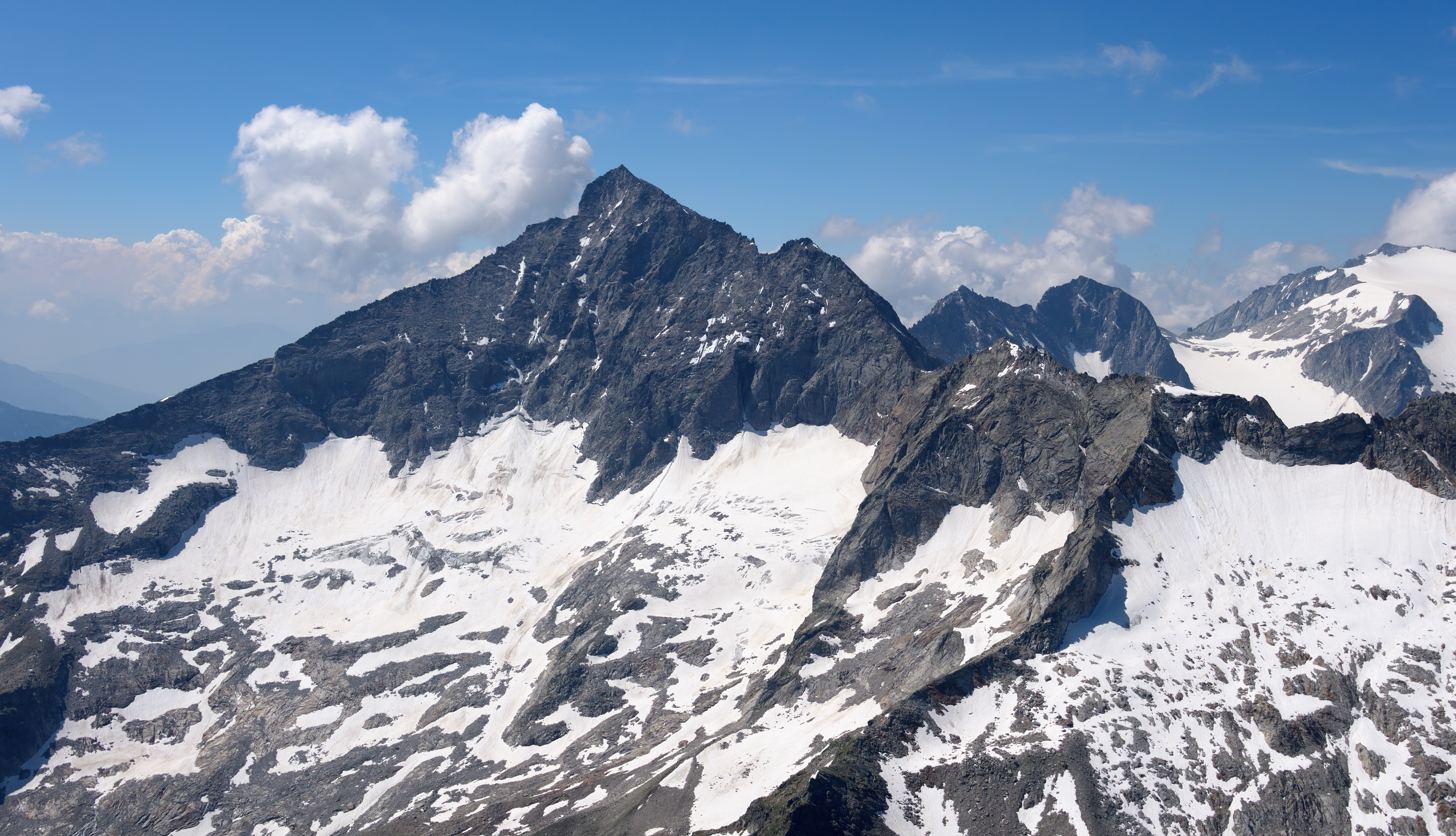

Highest point
- Elevation: 3,379 m (11,086 ft)
- Listing: Alpine mountains above 3000 m
- Coordinates: 47°1′57″N 11°54′56″E

Geography
- Location: Tyrol, Austria / South Tyrol, Italy
- Parent range: Zillertal Alps

Climbing
- First ascent: 12 September 1843 by Markus Vincent Lipold with an unknown companion

The Großer Löffler is a mountain in the Zillertal Alps on the border between Tyrol, Austria, and South Tyrol, Italy.
