= Prettau =

Comune of South Tyrol, Italy

Prettau Predoi
- Comune
- Gemeinde Prettau (German); Comune di Predoi (Italian)
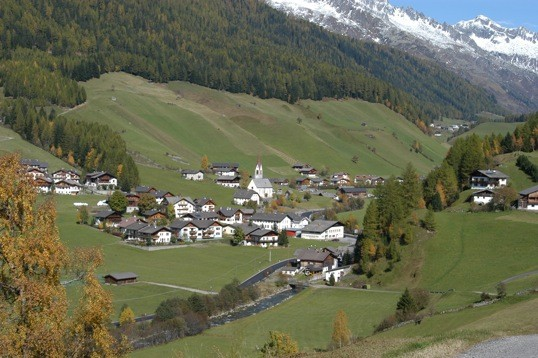
- View of Prettau

- Coat of arms

- Location within Italy Location within Trentino-Alto Adige/Südtirol
- Coordinates: 47°2′N 12°6′E
- Country: Italy
- Region: Trentino-Alto Adige/Südtirol
- Province: South Tyrol

Government
  - Mayor: Robert Alexander Steger

Area
  - Total: 86 km^{2} (33 sq mi)
- Elevation: 1,478 m (4,849 ft)

Population (2024)
  - Total: 518
  - Density: 6.0/km^{2} (16/sq mi)
- Demonym(s): German: Prettauer; Italian: di Predoi
- Time zone: UTC+1 (CET)
  - Summer (DST): UTC+2 (CEST)
- Postal code: 39030
- Dialing code: 0474
- Website: www.gemeinde.prettau.bz.it

Prettau (German: [prɛˈtaɪ]; Italian: Predoi [preˈdɔi]) is a comune (municipality) of South Tyrol, an Italian province in the country's north. It is the northernmost comune of Italy and is located within the Alps at the border with Austria. It is situated at 1,478 metres (4,849 ft) above sea level. As of 2024, the population was 518.

Copper mining was historically the major industry in Prettau, until the abandonment of its copper mine in 1893.

== History ==
Prettau became a comune in 1958.

Its coat of arms was granted in 1967 and is a blue and silver shield divided by four stylised adjacent mountain peaks and charged with two crossed pickaxes in the lower half. The shield depicts Prettau surrounded by tall glacial mountains, and the pickaxes are a reference to Prettau's historical copper mining industry.

== Geography ==
Prettau is located 1,478 metres (4,849 ft) above sea level. Its territory covers an area of 86 square kilometres (33 mi^{2}). About 70% of its area is protected land within the boundaries of Rieserferner-Ahrn Nature Park. Prettau is the northernmost comune of Italy.

== Demographics ==
The 2023 population census recorded 509 residents in Prettau. However, the municipal government website gives a population of 518 at the end of 2024.

At the time of the 2024 linguistic census, 98.59% of Prettau's residents spoke German and 1.41% spoke Italian as their first language.

== Economy ==
Copper mining was the main economic activity in Prettau until 1893. According to a local legend, a farmer discovered Prettau's copper deposits by chance while trying to tame a bull. The bull's horns struck the ground and brought out golden sand. Locals initially mistook it for gold before realising it was copper. The old copper mine has since been converted into a local history museum.

Prettau's economy is now served primarily by tourism. The comune is known for its local bobbin lace–making.
