= Zillertal Alps =

Mountain range on the border of Austria and Italy

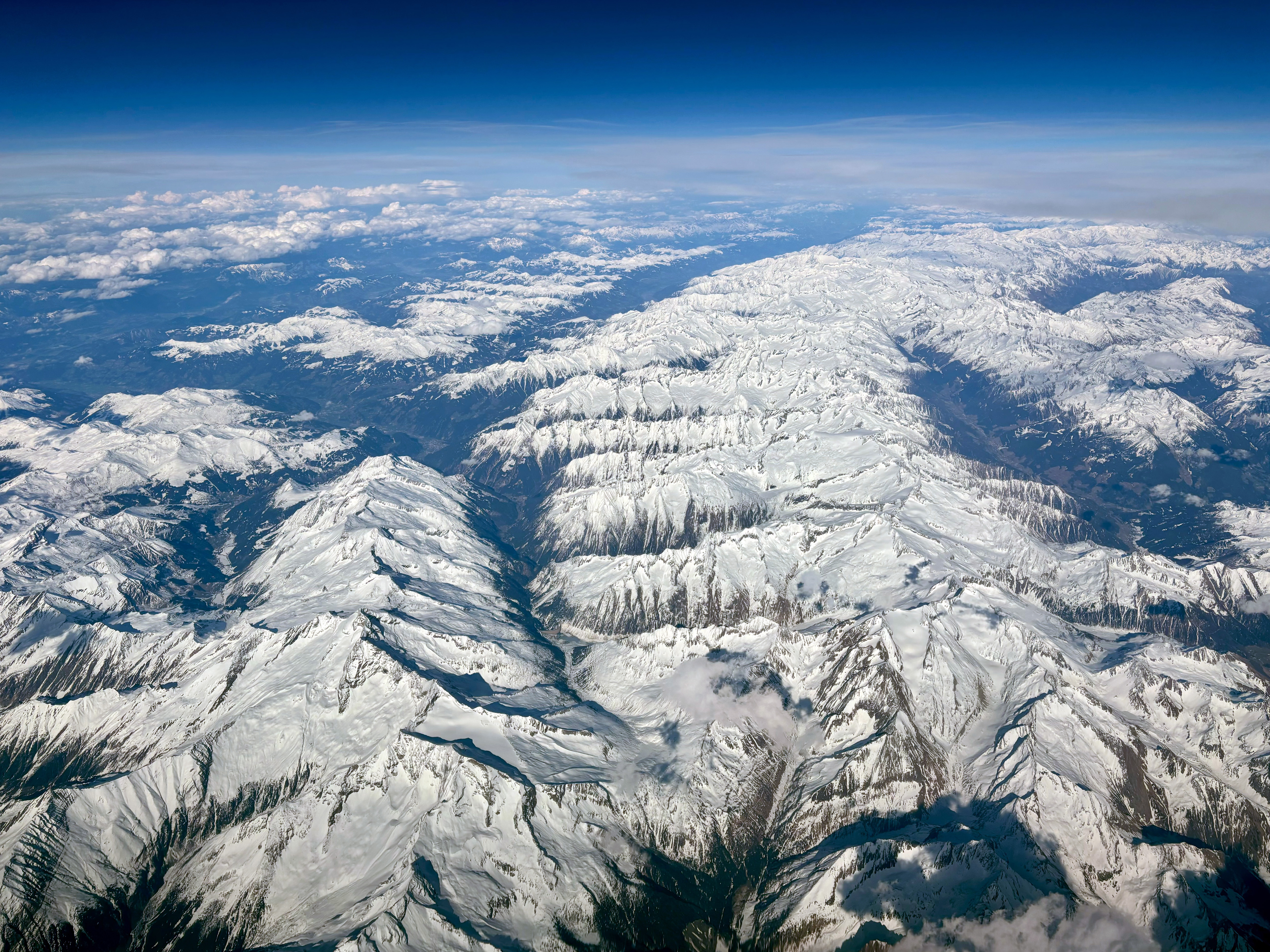
- The Zillertal Alps

Highest point
- Peak: Hochfeiler
- Elevation: 3,510 m (11,520 ft)
- Coordinates: 46°58′22″N 11°43′34″E

Geography
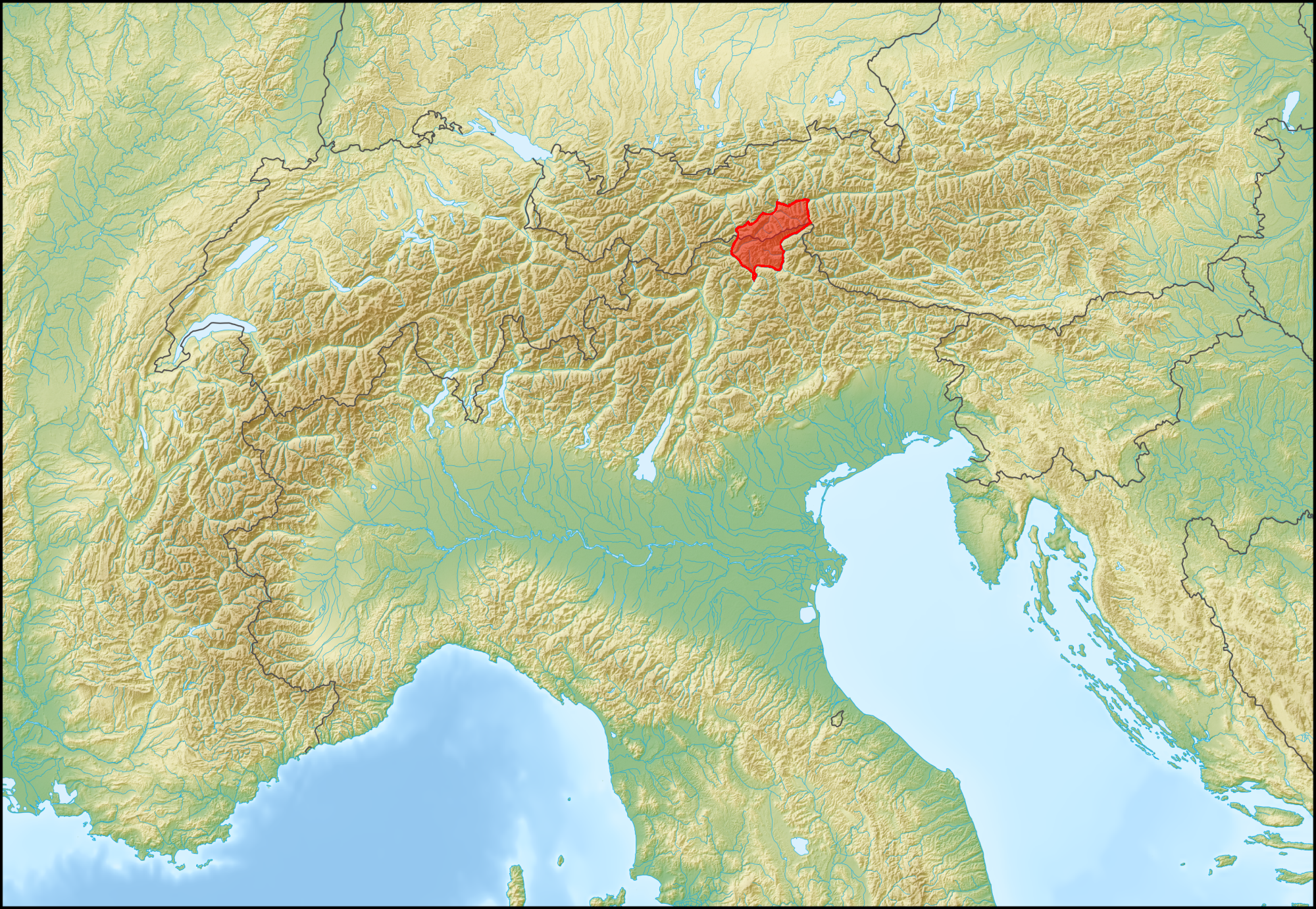
- Zillertal Alps (in red) within the Alps
- Countries: Austria; Italy
- States: Tyrol; Salzburg; South Tyrol
- Range coordinates: 47°00′N 11°55′E
- Parent range: Central Eastern Alps

The Zillertal Alps (Italian: Alpi Aurine; German: Zillertaler Alpen) are a mountain range of the Central Eastern Alps on the border of Austria and Italy.

== Name ==
The range is named after the Zillertal (Ziller river valley) on its north.

== Geography ==
The range is bounded by the Tuxerjoch mountain pass to the north (separating it from the Tux Alps); the Birnlücke - Forcella del Picco pass to the east (separating it from the Hohe Tauern); the Eisack and its tributary the Rienz to the south (separating it from the Southern Limestone Alps); and the Brenner Pass to the west (separating it from the Stubai Alps).

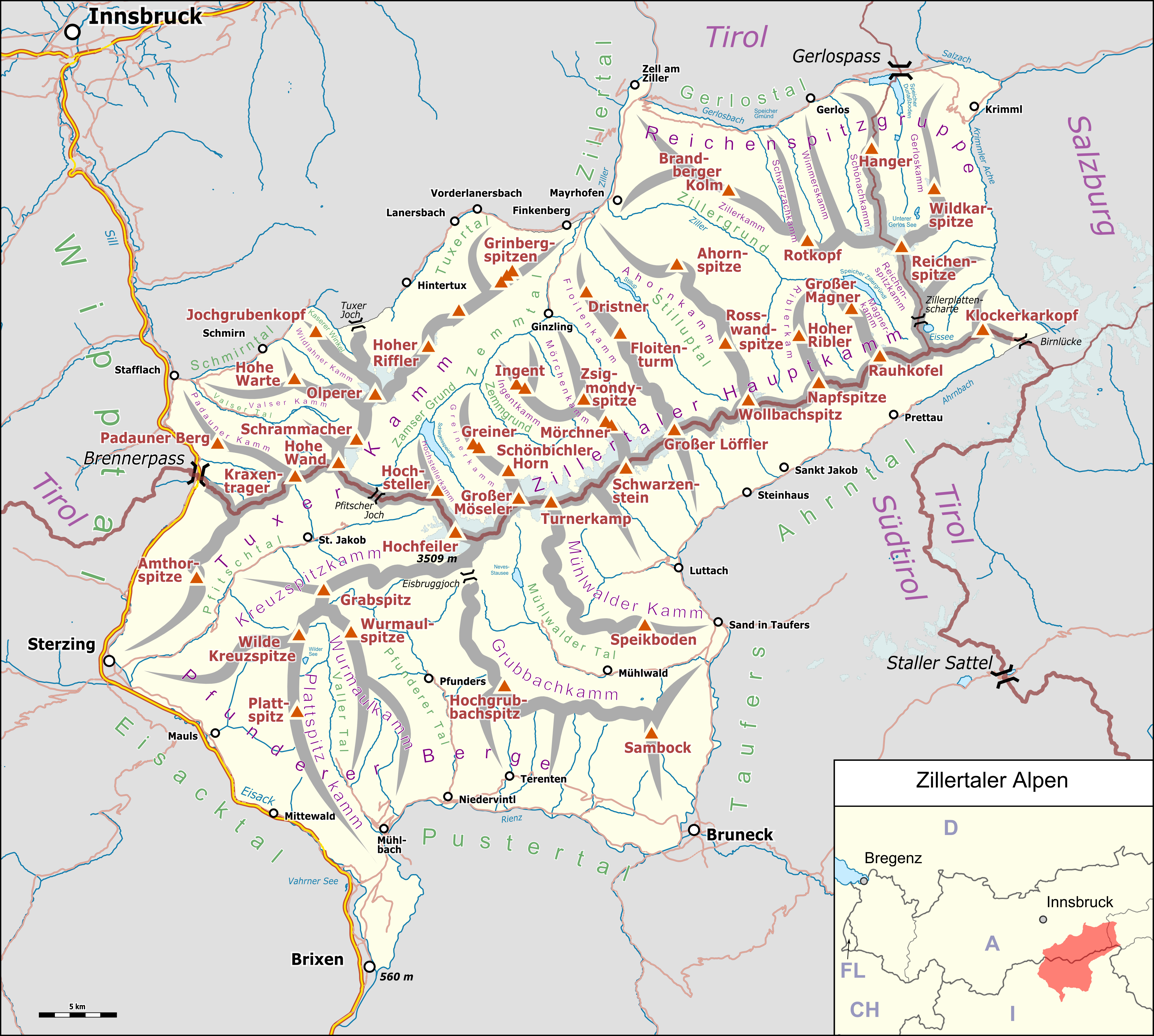
Overview map showing major summits in the Zillertal Alps

== Sub-groups ==
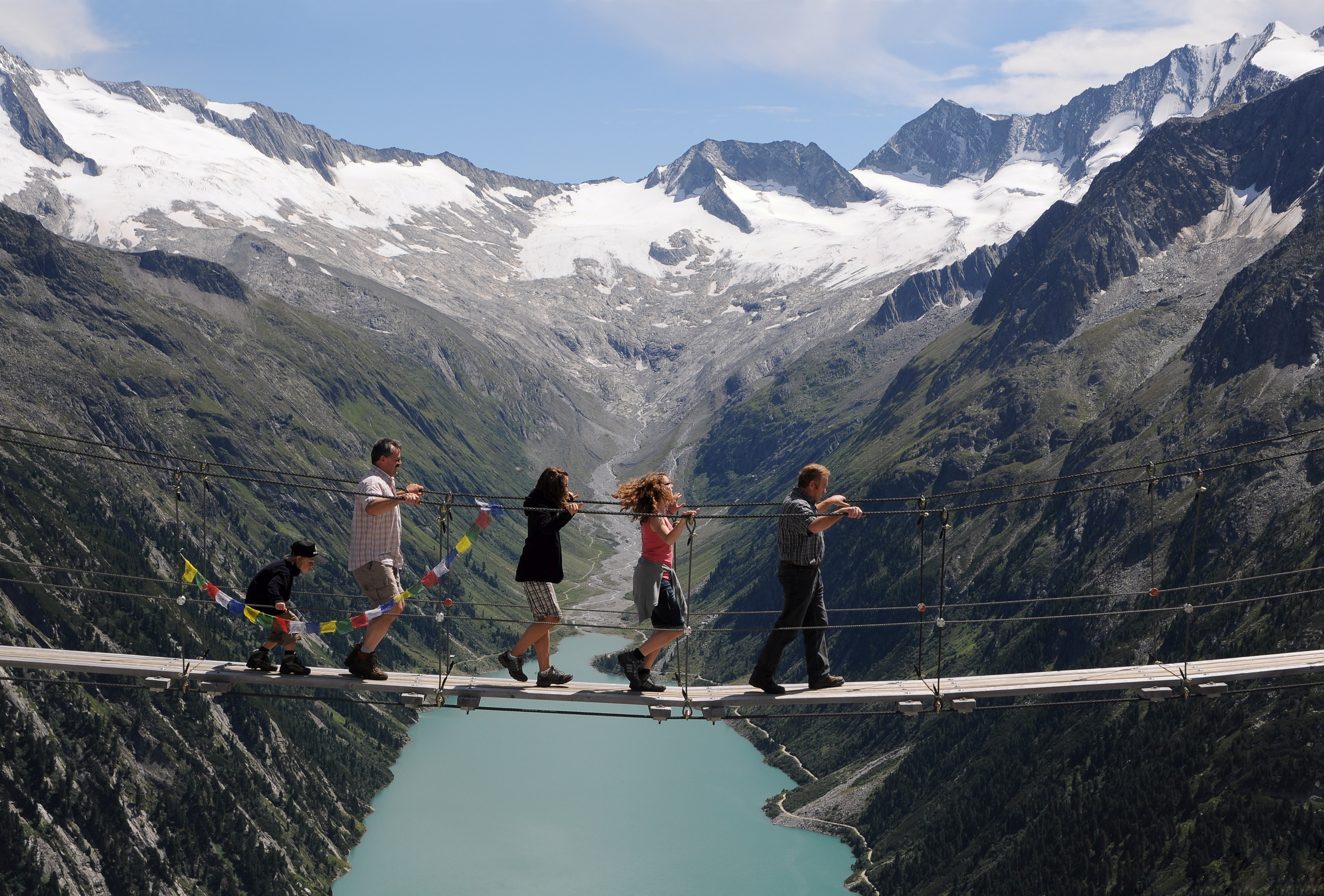
Simple suspension bridge in the Zillertal Alps

The Zillertal Alps are divided into the following sub-groups:

- Tux main ridge (Tuxer Hauptkamm)
- Zillertal main ridge (Zillertaler Hauptkamm) and side ridges
  This is further sub-divided as follows: Hauptkamm, Hochstellerkamm, Greinerkamm, Mörchen and Igentkamm, Floitenkamm, Ahornkamm, Riblerkamm, Magnerkamm.
- Reichenspitze Group and eastern Ziller ridges
  This is further subdivided as follows: Reichenspitzkamm, Gerloskamm, Schönachkamm, Wimmerkamm, Schwarzachkamm, Zillerkamm, Klockerkarstock.
- Pfunderer Mountains (Pfunderer Berge)
  This is further subdivided as follows: Kreuzspitzkamm, Plattspitzkamm, Wurmaulkamm, Grubbachkamm, Mühlwalder Kamm.

== Peaks ==
The main peaks of the Zillertal Alps are:

Peak	Elevation (m/ft)	
Hochfeiler	3,510	11,515
Großer Möseler	3,486	11,438
Olperer	3,480	11,418
Hochfernerspitze	3,463	11,362
Schrammacher	3,410	11,190
Turnerkamp	3,422	11,228
Großer Löffler	3,382	11,096
Fußstein	3,380	11,090
Hoher Weißzint	3,371	11,060
Schwarzenstein	3,370	11,057
Reichenspitze	3,305	10,844
Hohe Wand	3,289	10,791
Großer Mörchner	3,287	10,785
Rauhkofel	3,251	10,666
Hoher Riffler	3,231	10,600
Hintere Stangenspitze	3,225	10,581
Zillerplatenspitze	3,148	10,328
Napfspitze	3,144	10,314
Wilde Kreuzspitze	3,135	10,286
Zsigmondyspitze	3,085	10,122
Ahornspitze	2,973	9,753
Gitschberg	2,510	8,230

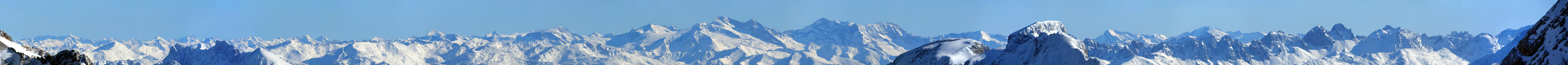
Panorama view from platform at Zugspitzplatt in direction south-east to the Zillertal Alps in winter
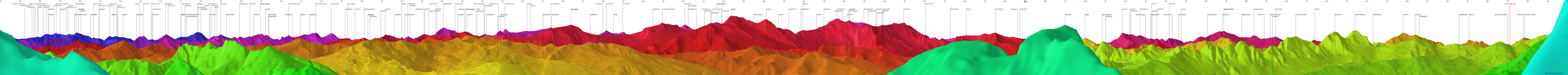
Computed panorama view from platform at Zugspitzplatt

== Passes ==
The main mountain passes of the Zillertal Alps are:

Mountain pass	Location	Type	Elevation (m/ft)	
Mitterbachjoch	Zemmtal to Sand in Taufers	snow	3130	10,270
Trippachsattel	Floiten Valley to Sand in Taufers	snow	3054	10,020
Alpeinerscharte	Zemmtal to Wipptal	footpath	2960	9712
Keilbachjoch	Mayrhofen to Ahrntal	footpath	2868	9410
Heiliggeistjöchl	Mayrhofen to Ahrntal	footpath	2658	8721
Krimmlertauern	Krimml to Ahrntal	footpath	2634	8642
Horndljöchl	Mayrhofen to Ahrntal	footpath	2555	8383
Lappacherjoch	Lappach to Ahrntal	footpath	2366	7763
Tuxerjoch	Tuxertal to Wipptal	footpath	2346	7697
Pfitscherjoch	Zemmtal to Sterzing	footpath	2248	7376
