= Pfitsch =

- Comune
- Gemeinde Pfitsch; Comune di Val di Vizze
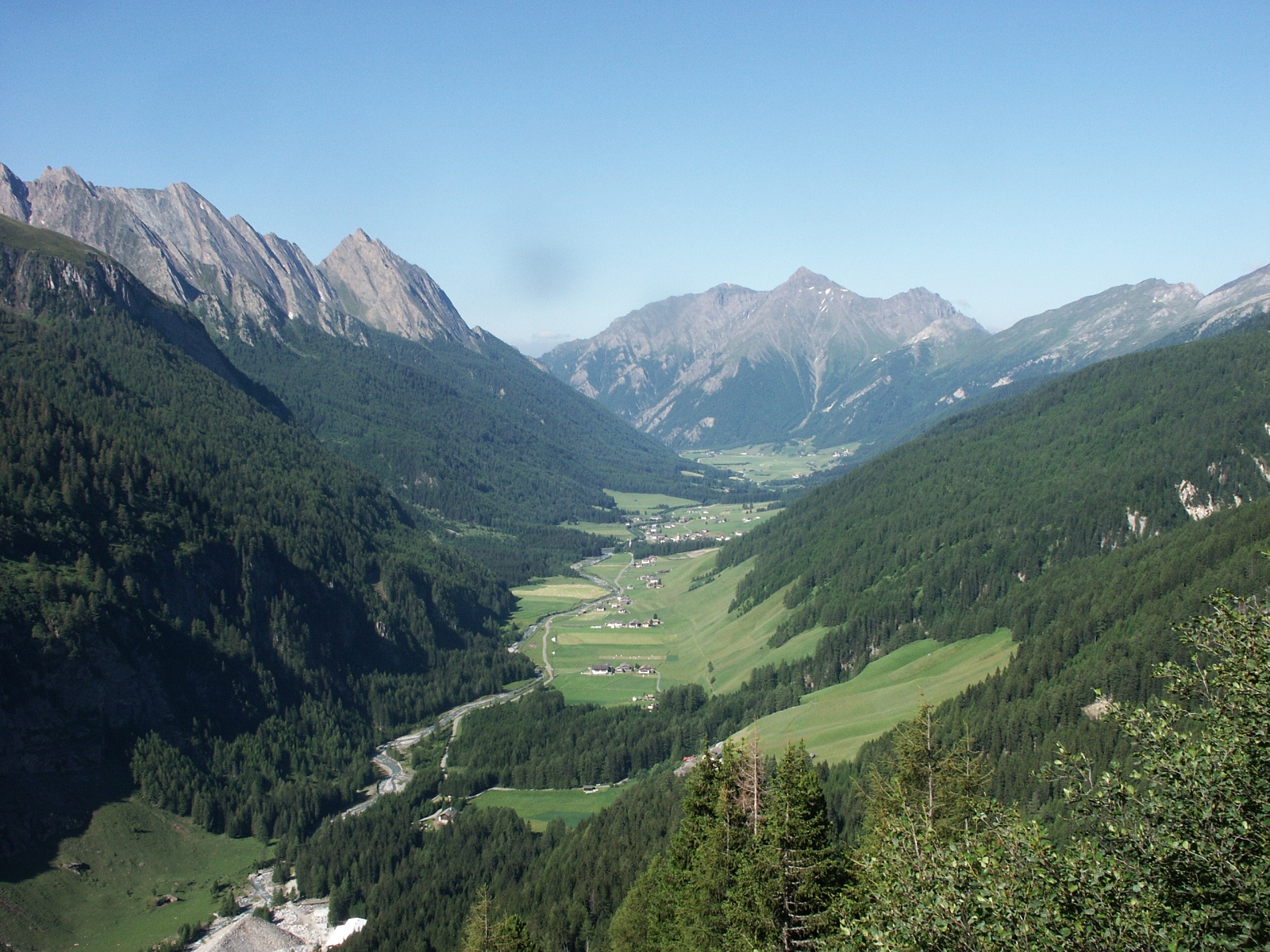
- View through the Pfitschtal towards Pfitsch

- Location within Italy Location within Trentino-Alto Adige/Südtirol
- Coordinates: 46°54′N 11°28′E
- Country: Italy
- Region: Trentino-Alto Adige/Südtirol
- Province: South Tyrol (BZ)
- Frazioni: Kematen (Caminata), St. Jakob (San Giacomo), Wiesen (Prati)

Government
  - Mayor: Stefan Gufler (SVP)

Area
  - Total: 142.3 km^{2} (54.9 sq mi)

Population (Dec. 2020)
  - Total: 3,068
  - Density: 21.56/km^{2} (55.84/sq mi)
- Demonym(s): German: Pfitscher; Italian: Valvizzesi
- Time zone: UTC+1 (CET)
  - Summer (DST): UTC+2 (CEST)
- Postal code: 39049
- Dialing code: 0472
- Website: Official website

Pfitsch (German pronunciation: [pfɪtʃ]; Italian: Val di Vizze [ˈval di ˈvittse]) is a comune (municipality) South Tyrol in northern Italy, located about 45 kilometres (28 mi) north of the city of Bolzano at the border with Austria. It is named after the valley of Pfitschtal or Pfitscher Tal.

== Geography ==
As of 30 November 2010, it had a population of 2,966 and an area of 142.3 square kilometres (54.9 mi^{2}).

Pfitsch borders the following municipalities: Brenner, Freienfeld, Mühlbach, Mühlwald, Sterzing, Vintl, Finkenberg (Austria), Gries am Brenner (Austria) and Vals (Austria).

=== Frazioni ===
The municipality of Pfitsch contains the frazioni (subdivisions, mainly villages and hamlets) Kematen (Caminata), St. Jakob (San Giacomo), and Wiesen (Prati).

=== Climate ===
Climate data for St.Jakob in Pfitsch: 1438m (2011−2023 normals, extremes 2010−present)
Month	Jan	Feb	Mar	Apr	May	Jun	Jul	Aug	Sep	Oct	Nov	Dec	Year
Record high °C (°F)	12.4 (54.3)	12.8 (55.0)	16.9 (62.4)	22.1 (71.8)	25.0 (77.0)	30.1 (86.2)	29.8 (85.6)	30.0 (86.0)	25.4 (77.7)	21.7 (71.1)	16.0 (60.8)	10.3 (50.5)	30.1 (86.2)
Mean daily maximum °C (°F)	−2.3 (27.9)	1.7 (35.1)	6.3 (43.3)	10.3 (50.5)	14.1 (57.4)	19.6 (67.3)	21.2 (70.2)	20.8 (69.4)	16.6 (61.9)	11.0 (51.8)	2.7 (36.9)	−1.4 (29.5)	10.1 (50.1)
Daily mean °C (°F)	−6.7 (19.9)	−4.3 (24.3)	0.1 (32.2)	4.2 (39.6)	8.3 (46.9)	12.9 (55.2)	14.5 (58.1)	14.1 (57.4)	10.2 (50.4)	5.6 (42.1)	−1.1 (30.0)	−5.3 (22.5)	4.4 (39.9)
Mean daily minimum °C (°F)	−11.0 (12.2)	−10.2 (13.6)	−6.1 (21.0)	−1.9 (28.6)	2.4 (36.3)	6.2 (43.2)	7.7 (45.9)	7.3 (45.1)	3.8 (38.8)	0.2 (32.4)	−4.8 (23.4)	−9.2 (15.4)	−1.3 (29.7)
Record low °C (°F)	−23.5 (−10.3)	−28.3 (−18.9)	−18.6 (−1.5)	−13.2 (8.2)	−6.2 (20.8)	−1.5 (29.3)	0.3 (32.5)	−1.2 (29.8)	−5.1 (22.8)	−10.3 (13.5)	−15.9 (3.4)	−22.4 (−8.3)	−28.3 (−18.9)
Average precipitation mm (inches)	45.0 (1.77)	32.4 (1.28)	33.0 (1.30)	50.2 (1.98)	97.7 (3.85)	118.7 (4.67)	135.4 (5.33)	168.0 (6.61)	99.7 (3.93)	107.9 (4.25)	83.7 (3.30)	54.5 (2.15)	1,026.2 (40.42)
Average precipitation days (≥ 1.0 mm)	7.1	5.5	5.9	7.5	13.4	13.4	14.4	12.8	9.5	8.8	8.3	7.1	113.7
Source: Landeswetterdienst Südtirol

== History ==
=== Coat-of-arms ===
The emblem is party per fess of sable and vert. The first part show a quartz with three points, in the second an horseshoe. The quartz is referred to the minerals abundant in the municipality, the horse shoe is the insignia of Lord Trautson who ruled the village of Wiesen. The emblem was granted in 1969.

== Main sights ==
=== Religious architecture ===
==== Parish St. James the Apostle in St. Jakob ====
The church was built between 1821 and 1824 under the direction of the curate Jakob Prantl who built 13 churches throughout Tyrol. The ceiling frescoes depict the Most Holy Sacrament and the decapitation of St. James are by Josef Renzler dating from 1823. The three altarpieces represent St. James, the baptism of Jesus and Our Lady Queen of the Holy Rosary are by Leopold Puellacher between 1824 and 1825.

==== The old Parish church in St. Jakob ====
The old Parish church is situated at the end of the Pfitschtal and is dedicated to St. James the patron saint of travellers and pilgrims. The church is mentioned for the first time in the protocol of the pastoral visit in 1577. According to the protocol of 1653 the church had two altars: one dedicated to the apostle James and the other to the Virgin. In the 1707 the church was enlarged, the bell tower raised and consecrated once again on July 1, 1714. The church was renovated in 1789 with a barrel vault ceiling decorated with frescoes representing St. James on a horseback who travels to Spain to fight against the Saracens. In the same period were painted six medallions representing the apostles Simon and Thomas, St. Nicholas, St. Martin, St. Sylvester and St. Sebastian. Inside take place a decorated pulpit, the two statues on the main altar and two altarpieces representing Our Lady of Sorrow and the suffering Christ. Particular attention should be paid to the church door decorated with ornamental carving marked by the wind and the weather. The night of February 28, 1817, an avalanche detached from Kraxentrager damaged the church. During the summer the curate Jakob Isidor Prantl made the church repaired and on October 13, 1817, was reopened to the faithful. After the avalanche the population considered the place no more safe and was decided to build a new one in another position. The new church was built between 1821 and 1824 under the direction of Jakob Isidor Prantl. The old church underwent restoration works in the years: 1987, 1997 and 1999.

==== Parish Holy Cross in Wiesen ====
The church is mentioned for the first time in a written document in 1337 and it is reported that has been consecrated once in 1434. The present church has a massive bell tower and was built with blocks of granite under the supervision of Adam Schaiter of Sterzing in Late Gothic and Renaissance style. In the 19th century was restored freeing the interior of Gothic elements. The ceiling frescoes are by Josef Renzler dating from 1841.

==== Chapel of the Holy Sepulchre in Wiesen ====
The chapel was built in an octagonal form on the initiative of Daniel von Elzenbaum at that time administrator of the parish of Sterzing. The chapel was consecrated in 1631 and is formed by a room sufficient to accommodate a simulacrum of the Holy Sepulchre which is decorated and open to the public every year for Easter.

=== Civil architecture ===
==== Moos Castle ====
The Moos Castle is mentioned for the first time in a written document in 1325 and was owned by the Trautson family. In the following years the castle changed several owners and in 1600, it was restored on commission of Christoph Geizkofler. The Moos Castle was efficiently protected by the “marsh of Sterzing” which extended to Wiesen. The South Tirol Winemakers Association acquired the castle in 1950, restored it without substantial changing and destined it as a retirement home for the elderly.

==== Sprechenstein Castle ====
The Sprechenstein Castle according to a document was re-built in 1241 on a high rocky spur southeast of Sterzing. The castle is formed by a lower fortress, an upper keep and a palace; it was owned by the Trautson. In 1775 the family Trautson extinguished and the castle passed to the Auersperg from Salzburg which are still the owner.

==== Ansitz Wiesenheim ====
Ansitz Wiesenheim is a three level palace with a low triangular pediment and an “Erker” tower with a saddle roof, placed at one corner of the building. The Medieval nucleus has a small wooden hall and rooms rebuilt around in the 17th century with the rooftree at sight.

==== Haidenschaft ====
Haidenschaft was a tower-house situated on the left side of Eisack river, in the municipality of Pfitsch, outside the jurisdiction of Sterzing and known since 1425. In 1553 was bought from the mining society Kössental. The front has an Erker on each of the three floors, it was restored in Baroque, with three bull's eye on the pediment, in the 18th century. It was known as “Tua House” from the family who lived in after World War I.

== Society ==
=== Linguistic distribution ===
According to the 2024 census, 87.22% of the population speak German, 12.60% Italian and 0.18% Ladin as a first language.

=== Demographic evolution ===
Historical population

Year	Pop.	±%
1921	1,590	—
1931	1,803	+13.4%
1936	1,943	+7.8%

Year	Pop.	±%
1951	1,912	−1.6%
1961	1,957	+2.4%
1971	2,211	+13.0%

Year	Pop.	±%
1981	2,325	+5.2%
1991	2,508	+7.9%
2001	2,619	+4.4%

Source: Data from ISTAT

== See also ==
- Pfitscher Bach
- Pfitschtal
