= Brenner Lake =

Brenner Lake may refer to:

- Brenner Lake (Minnesota), United States
- Brennersee, a lake in Austria
