= Garmisch-Partenkirchen train crash =

Garmisch-Partenkirchen train crash may refer to:

- Garmisch-Partenkirchen train collision, 1995
- Garmisch-Partenkirchen train derailment, 2022
