= Hohe Wand (Croda Alta) =

- Italian: Croda Alta
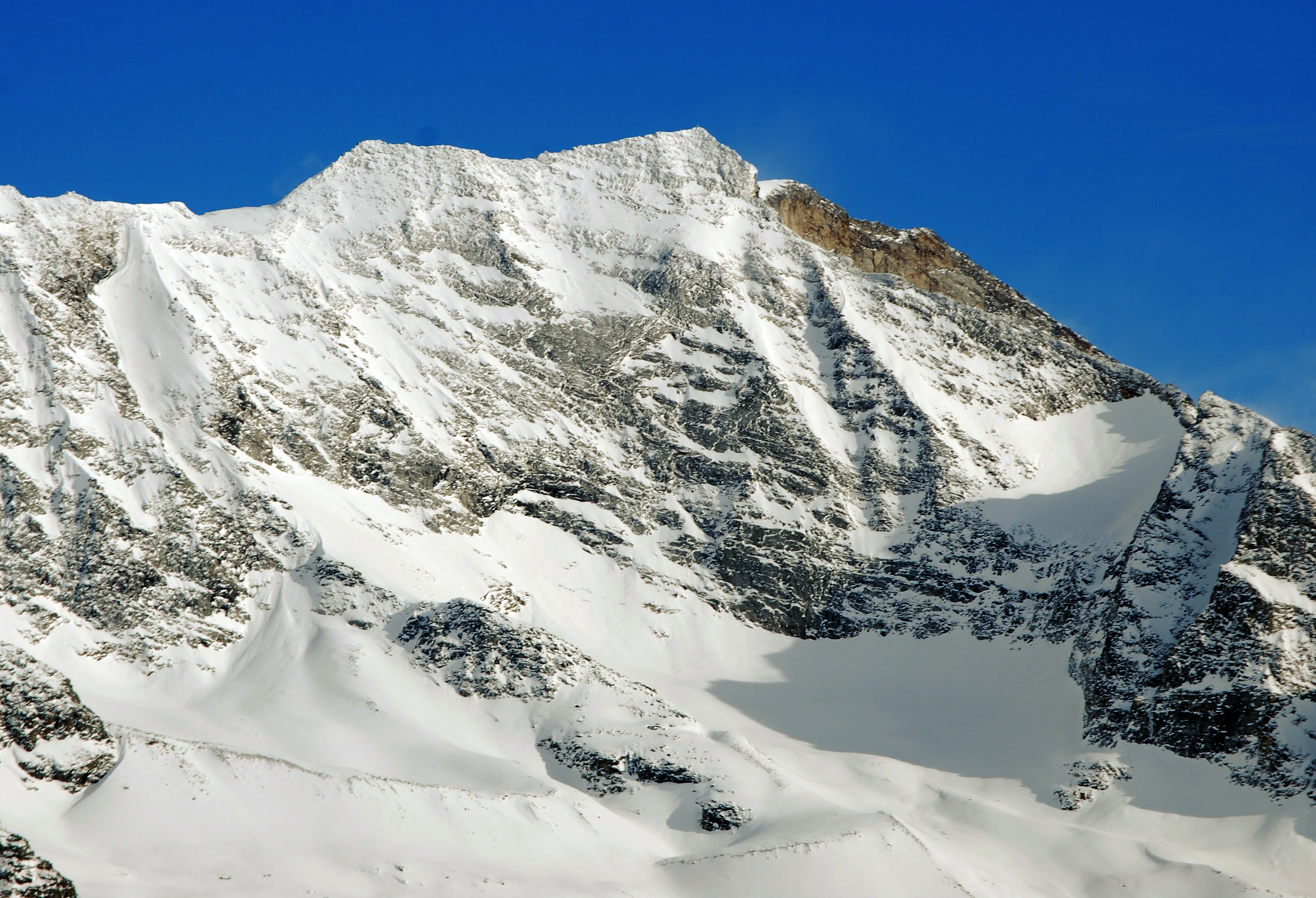
- Northwest aspect

Highest point
- Elevation: 3,289 m (10,791 ft)
- Prominence: 171 m (561 ft)
- Parent peak: Schrammacher
- Isolation: 1.92 km (1.19 mi)
- Coordinates: 47°00′48″N 11°37′38″E

Naming
- Etymology: High Wall

Geography
- Location within Alps Location within Austria Location within Italy
- Interactive map of Hohe Wand
- Country: Austria / Italy
- State: Tyrol
- Protected area: Naturschutzgebiet Valsertal
- Parent range: Alps; Zillertal Alps
- Topo map: Tabacco 38 Zillertal – Tuxer Alpen

Geology
- Rock age: Paleozoic
- Rock type: Metamorphic rock

Climbing
- First ascent: 1883

Hohe Wand (Italian: Croda Alta) is a mountain on the Austria–Italy border.

== Description ==
Hohe Wand is a 3,289-meter-elevation (10,791-foot) summit in the Zillertal Alps which are a subrange of the Alps. The mountain is located in Innsbruck-Land District, 32 kilometers (20 miles) south-southeast of the Austrian city of Innsbruck, and 19 kilometers (12 miles) northeast of the town of Sterzing in the Italian province of South Tyrol. Precipitation runoff from the mountain's slopes drains south into the Pfitscher Bach, northwest into tributaries of the Sill, and east into tributaries of the Ziller. Topographic relief is significant as the summit rises 1,900 meters (6,233 feet) above the northwest slope in two kilometers (1.24 miles) and 1,800 meters (5,905 feet) above the Pfitscher Bach in two kilometers. The mountain is composed of a mix of gneiss, schist, and granite that are mainly of Paleozoic age, and metamorphosed during the Alpine orogeny. The German and Italian toponyms for this mountain translate as "High Wall." The nearest higher mountain is Schrammacher, 1.93 kilometers (1.2 miles) to the northeast.

== Climate ==
Based on the Köppen climate classification, Hohe Wand is located in an alpine climate zone with long, cold winters, and short, mild summers. Weather systems are forced upwards by the mountains (orographic lift), causing moisture to drop in the form of rain and snow. This climate supports the Stampflkees Glacier on the peak's northeast slope. The months of June through September offer the most favorable weather for visiting or climbing this mountain.

== See also ==
- Geography of the Alps
- Geology of the Alps
