= Grafsee =

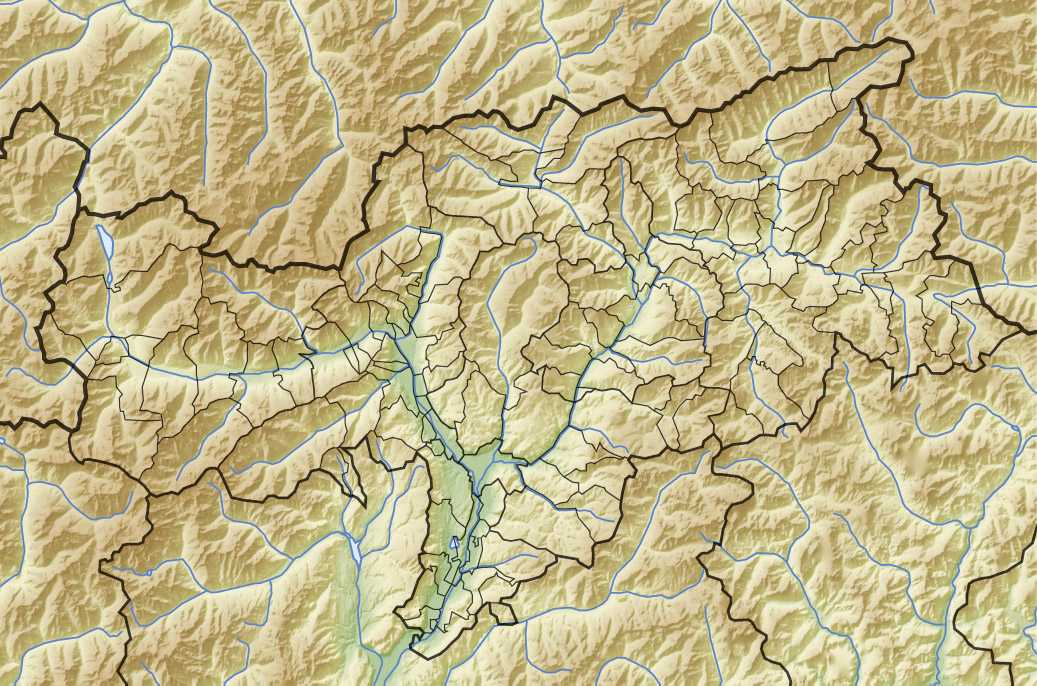
- Location within South Tyrol
- Location: Pfitsch, South Tyrol, Italy
- Coordinates: 46°58′26″N 11°32′46″E
- Type: mountain lake
- Basin countries: Italy
- Surface area: 0.196 ha (0.48 acres)
- Surface elevation: 2,000 m (6,600 ft)
- Settlements: Kematen (near Sand in Taufers)

Grafsee (literally Count Lake) is a lake in northern Italy. It lies more than 2,000 metres (6,600 ft) above sea level and approximately 500 metres (1,600 ft) above the Hatzlacke lake. Both lakes can be reached on foot by following travel route 5 beginning from Kematen. To the south of the lake is a snack station called the Gruben alpine hut.

The cold lake water with A grade quality remains very fresh at 11 °C (52 °F) even on hot summer days. Bathing is therefore only conditionally recommended. Various kinds of trout thrive in the lake. Rain and snow melt supply the lake with fresh water, there being no natural in- and outflows. The lake received its name from a legend that a count was once turned into water.
