= Garmisch-Partenkirchen train collision =

1995 railway incident in Germany

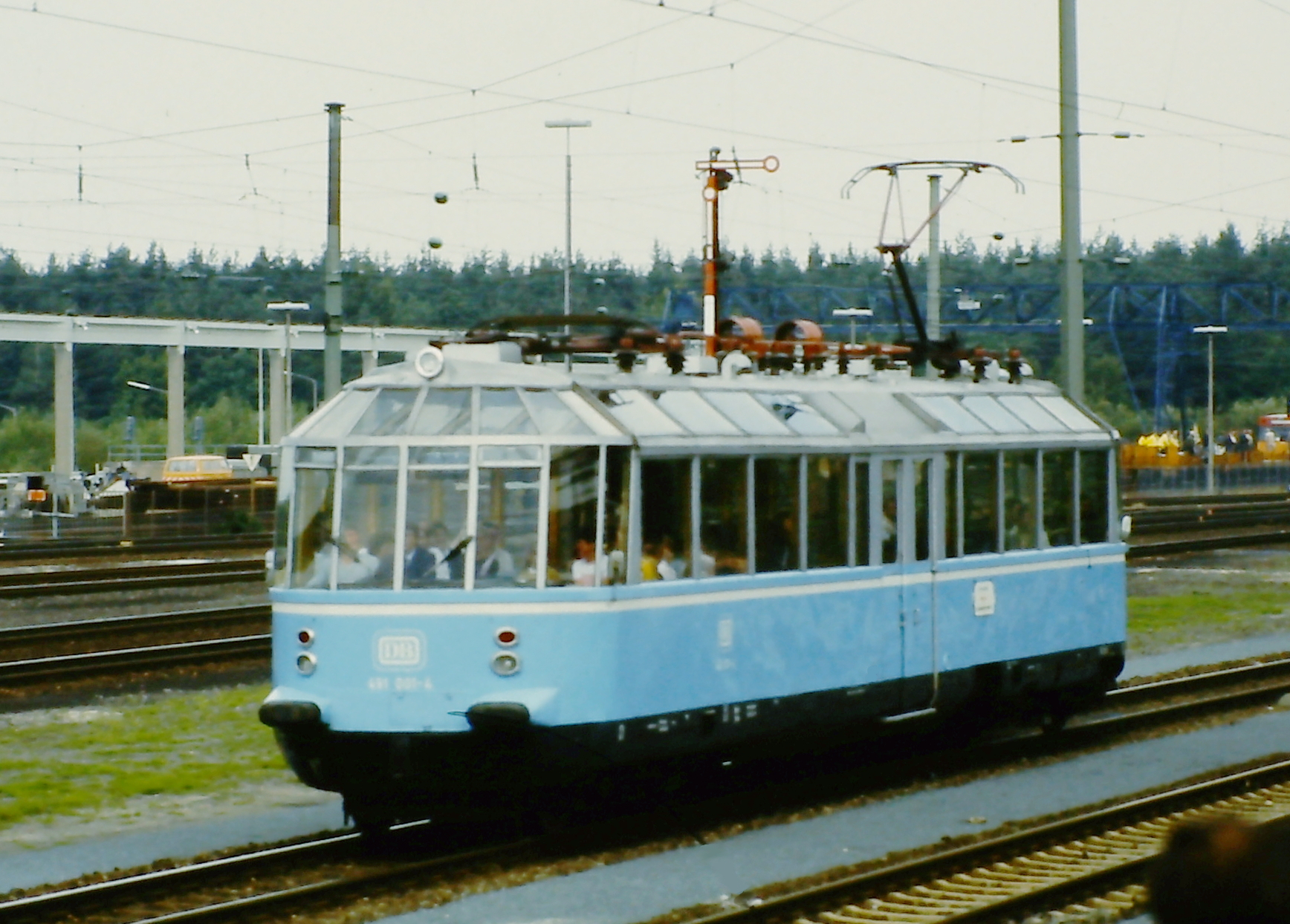
- 491 001, one of the trains involved in the accident, seen ten years before in Nürnberg

Details
- Date: 12 December 1995
- Location: Garmisch-Partenkirchen
- Country: Germany
- Line: Mittenwald Railway
- Operator: ÖBB, DB
- Incident type: Collision
- Cause: SPAD whilst departing

Statistics
- Trains: 2
- Passengers: 76
- Deaths: 1
- Injured: 41
- Damage: 491 001 completely disabled after the accident

The Garmisch-Partenkirchen train collision took place on 12 December 1995, when an ÖBB Regional-Express train traveling from Innsbruck to Munich departed from Garmisch-Partenkirchen Station in Bavaria despite a red light due to distraction, colliding with a DB tourist train, killing one person and injuring 51.

== Background ==
The first train was Regional-Express (RE) number 3612, pulled by the ÖBB 1044 235 electric locomotive, a scheduled train running from Innsbruck HBF to Munich HBF, with a regular 10-minute stop at the Garmisch-Partenkirchen railway station. The second train was a well-known DB Class 491 001 "Glass Train", a tourist train operated by Deutsche Bahn running a chartered service that day on the Mittenwald Line, and traveling in the opposite direction. Because the line was single-tracked, the Glass Train was scheduled to pass through the central track at Garmisch-Partenkirchen Station, while the RE3612 train waited at the station siding before continuing onward. Thus the RE3612's regular 10-minute wait time at the station was lengthened to 13 minutes that day to let the tourist train pass.

The RE's 1044 locomotive was very robust, ensuring that any impact at lower speeds would cause it only minor damage. The 491 tourist train, however, had a much weaker structure due in large part to its panoramic viewing windows. It was also over a half-century older; while the 1044 locomotive had been completed at the SGP workshops in 1992, the 491 001, built by Waggonfabrik Fuchs, had been in service since 1935.

== Events ==
The guard of the RE train had stepped into the Garmisch-Partenkirchen station to get a cup of coffee, but the station staff had just run out, and he waited until more was ready. Then, to his surprise, a colleague informed him that he had to depart. The guard ran back into the train, whistled for departure, and closed the automatic doors. However, the signal for the track where the RE train had stopped was obstructed by the train and the platform roof. Weather conditions at the time of the accident were lightly falling snow, with temperatures around 0 °C (32 °F).

The RE train driver heard the whistle and started accelerating while looking back at the train and the station, quickly picking up speed. The driver forgot to look at the signal, which indicated Hp 0 (Stop) as scheduled to allow the Glass Train time to pass through the station. As the RE driver attempted to get into position in the drivers' seat, he noticed the oncoming Glass Train just a few meters away. Despite emergency braking by both trains, a collision could not be avoided. The RE train hit the Glass Train while still traveling 47 km/h; the Glass Train was moving at 37 km/h.

== Aftermath ==
After the collision, one passenger from the Glass Train died after being evacuated by air to Munich. All 27 other Glass Train occupants were injured from the impact, the uprooted seats, and flying glass shards from the panoramic windows. Another 14 people aboard the RE train received minor injuries.

The RE train driver was sentenced to 10 months' probation and a fine of 9,000 DM, and the guard to a fine of 6,000 DM.

The front end of the Glass Train was crushed, while its motor bogie was severely damaged. The train was towed back to Nürnberg in January 1996. Its exterior was ultimately repaired, and it is on display at the railway turntable of the Augsburg Railway Park railway museum. The train is not likely to run anytime soon due to the high costs of rebuilding a new motor bogie.

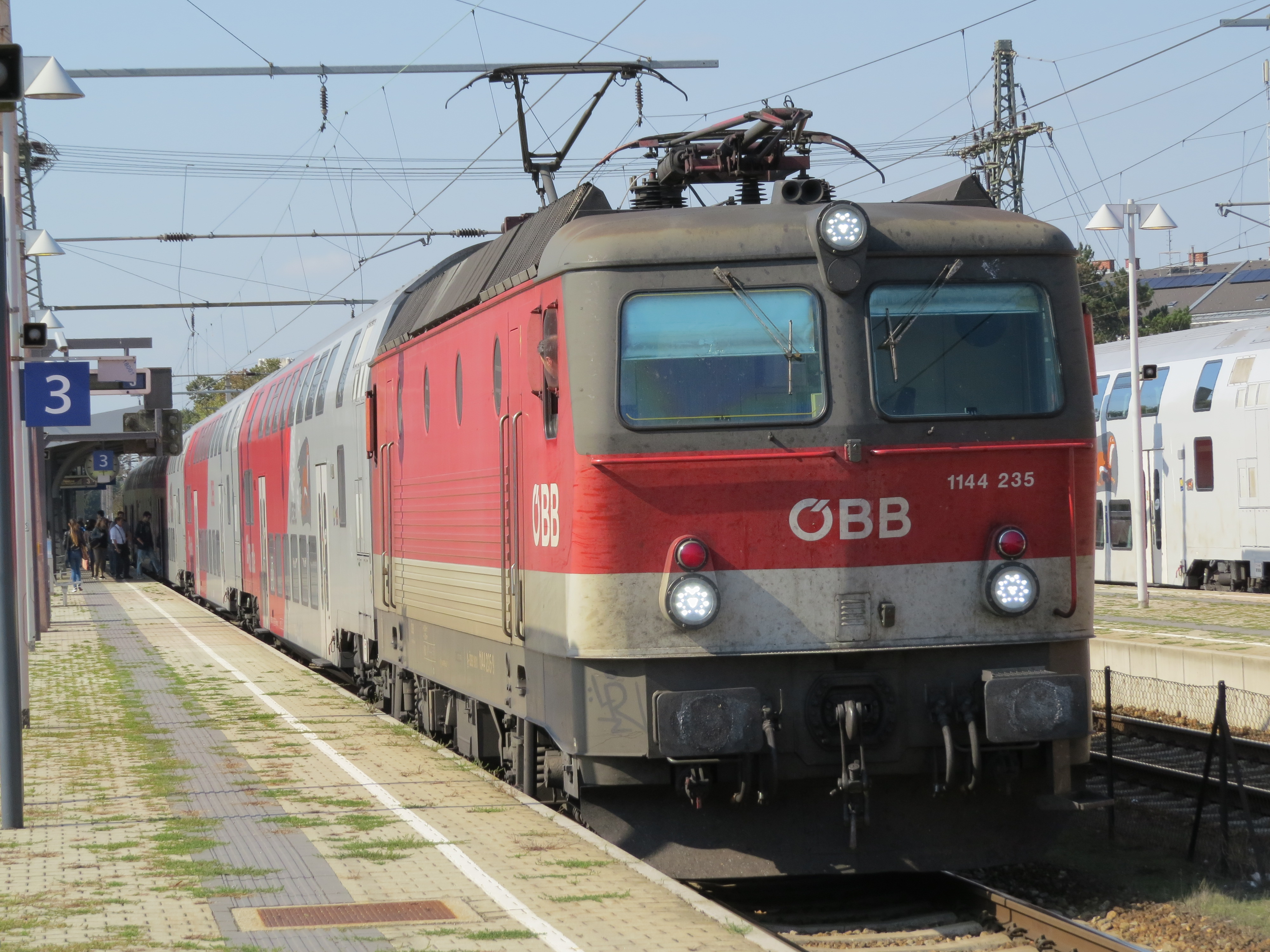
1144 235, the other locomotive involved in the accident, seen while still in service in 2017

The 1044 locomotive suffered minor damage, was quickly repaired, and put back into service. In 2002, it was upgraded to a Class 1144 locomotive, with modernized equipment installed. As of August 2018, it is still in operation.
