= ÖBB Class 1044 =

Electric locomotive

ÖBB Class 1044 / 1144
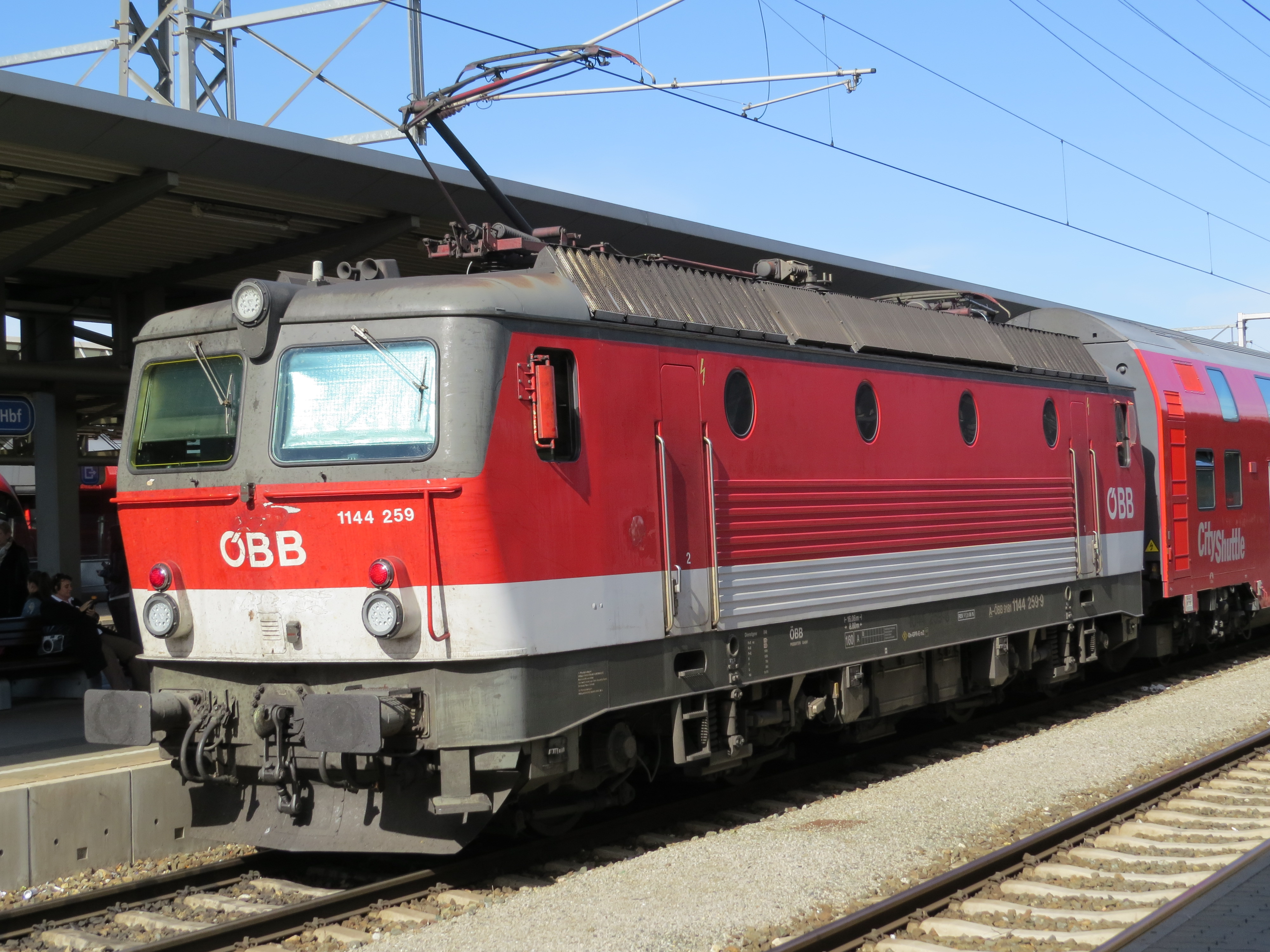
- 1144 097-3 with a City Shuttle train at Wiener Neustadt Hauptbahnhof, 12 October 2017.
Type and origin
- Power type: Electric
- Builder: Joint between BBC, ELIN, Siemens, and SGP
- Build date: 1976–1995
- Total produced: Prototype: 2; Series production: 215
Specifications
- Configuration
  - UIC: Bo′Bo′
- Gauge: 1,435 mm (4 ft 8 1/2 in) standard gauge
- Length: 16,100 mm (52 ft 10 in)
- Loco weight: 84 tonnes (82.67 long tons; 92.59 short tons)
- Electric system/s: 15 kV Overhead, 16.7Hz
- Current pickup: Pantograph
- Traction motors: 4 x
- Transmission: Electric
- Loco brake: Air and Regenerative Brake
- Train brakes: Air
- Safety systems: PZB, LZB And Sifa
Performance figures
- Maximum speed: 160 km/h (100 mph)
- Power output: Prototype: 5,200 kW (6,970 hp); Series production: 5,000 kW (6,710 hp)
- Tractive effort: Prototype: 203 kN (45,640 lbf); Series production: 208.9 kN (46,960 lbf)
Career
- Operators: ÖBB
- Numbers: 1044.01–126; 1144.003–126; 1044.200–290; 1144.200–290
- Nicknames: Alpine vacuum cleaner (Alpenstaubsauger)
- Locale: Austria
- Delivered: 1977–1986, 1989–1995

The ÖBB Class 1044/1144 is a series of four-axle electric locomotives designed and manufactured by Simmering-Graz-Pauker AG in Graz.

Developed initially for the ÖBB, Austria's state-owned railway company, the model is considered to be a significant milestone in locomotive construction. Upon its introduction in 1976, the 1044s were among the most powerful four-axle electric locomotives in the world. They would serve until as ÖBB's flagship model until their replacement by the Siemens 1016/1116 series between 2001 and 2006.

== History ==
In the late 1960s, the Swedish industrial conglomerate ASEA pioneered advancements in electric locomotive design through their development of thyristor gate switches, also known as silicon-controlled rectifiers or SCRs, for use in railway systems engineering. Their integration would allow operators to exercise greater control over voltage consumption and power switching in traction motors, improving efficiency, reliability, and safety.

By the mid-1970s, the successful introduction of ten thyristor-controlled 1043 Class locomotives (manufactured by ASEA in Sweden) in Austria convinced the ÖBB to mandate the use of thyristor bridges as a standard requirement for future orders. The ÖBB commissioned two Swiss manufacturers to each build a prototype based on the 1043 series. The first prototype, designated 1044.01, was a diode-powered Re 4/4 locomotive from Bern-Lötschberg-Simplon-Bahn, retrofitted with thyristor control using an eight-bridge circuit. The second prototype, designated 1044.02, was a newly delivered Ge 4/4 II locomotive featuring thyristor technology from Rhaetian Railway using a four bridge circuit.

The 1044.01 was introduced into service in 1974, while the 1044.02 would be introduced the following year in 1975. As the later prototype ultimately proved more successful, the production version would be based on the 1044.02 with a simplified traction motor winding design. Series production began with unit 1044.03 in 1978.

In 1978, wheel tire fractures occurred on locomotives 1044.03 through 1044.20. While it was originally assumed that this was the result of a manufacturing defect, an investigation revealed that the cracks had originated from the serial numbers stamped into the wheels, as was also found to be the case with locomotives of the earlier 1110 series. The tiny indentations left behind by the stamping process undermined the structural integrity of the wheels, creating fissures under high stress. As a stopgap solution, the numbers were instead etched into the wheel tires by hand. Locomotives from 1044.27 onward were fitted with non-stamped wheels.

In the winters of late 1979 and late 1980, the 1044 Class locomotives experienced serious problems due to moisture from melted snow entering through their air intake systems. In response, higher-volume air intake grilles of various designs were installed from 1044.71 onward to prevent the intake of snow. Cyclonic separators were also installed to avoid having to change the design of air intake grilles on the earlier models from 1044.01 to 1044.70.

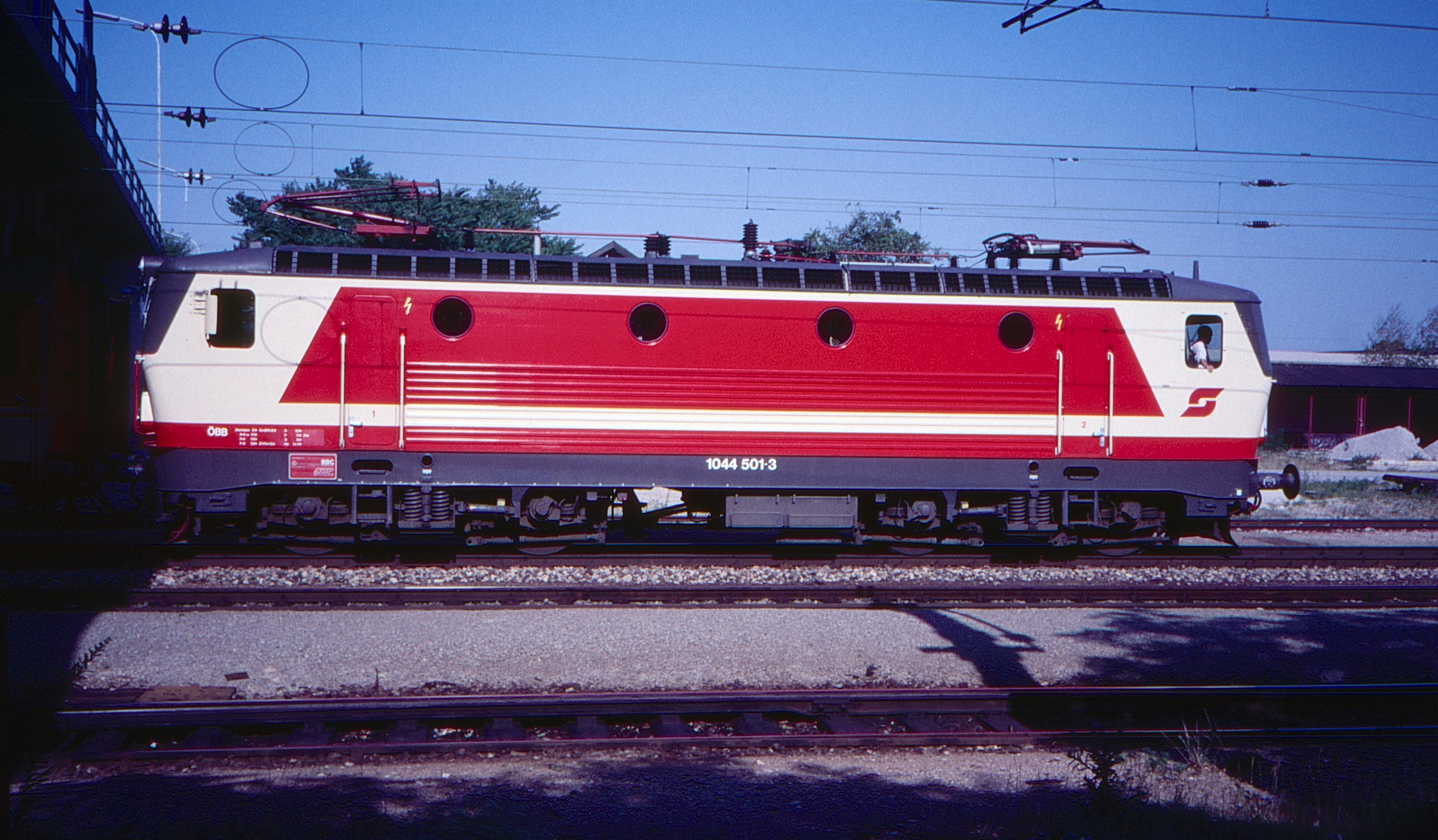
1044.501–3 at Leobersdorf station. Note the modified pantograph on the No.1 end

By 1987, a total of 126 locomotives (1044.01 to 1044.126) had been built. While 1044.02 was taken out of service and used for spare parts for 1044.43, the original prototype locomotive 1044.01 was converted into a high-speed test locomotive in 1987.

For high-speed testing, the 1044.501 was fitted with new flush end-plates made of armored glass and a pantograph to provide it with high levels of direct power while in motion. The quill drives were also replaced by new components manufactured by AEG. These modifications allowed the 1044.501 reach as high as between 220 km/h and 241.25 km/h. In 1996, it was taken out of service due to drive damage and later rebuilt on standard bogies. The 1044.501 was decommissioned in 2002 and is currently on display at the Strasshof Railway Museum in Strasshof an der Nordbahn, Austria.

A further 90 more locomotives were built (1044.201 to 1044.290), between 1989 and 1995. These featured improvements on such as a modified bogie design, improved sound insulation, and a modified transmission ratio.

Between 2002 and 2005, all locomotives in the 1044.2 series were converted into the new 1144.2 series. In 2009, the 1044.0 Class locomotive was also converted to the 1144 series. The 1044.40 largely retained its original livery of blood orange featuring the old ÖBB logo ("Pflatsch") and was coined a "modern nostalgia locomotive", and remained in scheduled service. Before the procurement of the 1016 and 1116 series, all express trains to Munich were hauled by the 1044 series.

A total of ten locomotives were severely damaged in accidents. Of these, four locomotives (022, 038, 047, and 076) were removed of service as a result. Locomotives 023, 043, 051, 061, 092, 096, and .241 were partly rebuilt with new bodies. Locomotive 1044.117 was the only one to be completely replaced.

Locomotives 023, 051, 092, and 096 were rebuilt with new or refurbished bodies:

- Locomotive 023 had high air-intakes installed.
- Locomotive 051 was rebuilt with parts of 1044.02 and put back into service as 1044.256. When the last 1044.02 (291) was completed by SGP, it was put into service as 1044.256 and the previous 1044.256 was renumbered 1044.200.
- The body of prototype 1044.02 was used for the reconstruction of 1044.043.
- The original body of 1044.043 was used when rebuilding 1044.241.

== Line control ==
The last engines in the series (1044.255–290) were manufactured with a line train control system, but this was not strictly required at its maximum speed of 160 km/h. From the outside, these late-series locomotives can be distinguished from earlier versions by the paintwork on the roof near the fans (LZB stripes). However, this is no longer used in current repaints.

== Livery variants ==
=== Original paint schemes ===
The 1044 001 to 126 classes had been painted with a blood orange body. The locomotives up to 1044.110 had a black frame. From 1044.111 onwards, the locomotives were given an umbra gray frame and the computer number with self-check digit ex works. The prototypes 1044.01 and 1044.02 still had panels with metal digits. From the 1044.03 onwards, the serial number was written on the panels with 80 centimetre high adhesive digits instead of metal digits (nickname "Taferl-44er"). From locomotive 1044.27 onwards, these plates were omitted and the numbers were written with 130 mm high digits. In 1987, locomotive 1044 001 was converted into express locomotive 1044 501. It also received a new design during the conversion.

=== Valousek design ===
Wolfgang Valousek continued to experiment with a new design. In 1989, five newly built locomotives were therefore given a further deviating design, the so-called "chessboard design". In addition to the first locomotives in the new series (201–203), these were the 1044 092, which was fitted with a new body, and the brand-new understudy 1044 117. 1144 092 and 1144 117 are still running in this design today. From 1044 204 onward, the locomotives were painted in a modified form of the chessboard design. The contrasting surface was omitted and the belly band was continued in the same way as other old locomotives repainted at this time. The traffic red locomotive body has an agate gray belly band and an umbra gray border around the front windows. As part of accident repairs or otherwise due repainting, all locomotives still painted blood orange as well as the 1044 201–203 (checkerboard) were also repainted. Only the 1044 040 was excluded from this, it was chosen as the blood orange nostalgia locomotive and was even given a black frame again, and later the already removed factory sign in the form of a sticker. In this look, it was used in front of scheduled trains and is still in regular service today as 1144.40.

== Conversion to 1144 ==
Between 2002 and 2005, the 1044 numbered 200 to 290 were equipped with compatible multiple and reversible train control. Where the 1044 216–290 were already equipped with multiple control by default. However, only the locomotives 1044 216–290 were compatible with each other. On locomotives 1044 200 to 1044 254, the Indusi I-60 was converted to the PZB 90-point train control system. In the course of these adaptations, the locomotives were renamed the 1144 series while retaining their serial numbers. As of August 2006, 119 locomotives of the 1044.0 series and 91 locomotives of the 1144 series (200–290) were in the ÖBB fleet.

In 2009, numbers 003 to 126 were also converted to the 1144 series. In addition to the installation of remote control, the converted locomotives were fitted with a GSM-R radio system, PZB 90, and new LED headlights. The conversion was completed in 2013. However, even after the conversion to the 1144, some locomotives were still running with incandescent bulbs in the headlights until they were finally replaced with LED lamps.

1144 061, which was converted to 1144 in the course of an accident repair, was no longer used as such.

1144.40 has been retained to this day as a heritage service largely in its original condition in blood orange and with the old ÖBB logo ("Pflatsch"). It was converted to 1144.40 and re-designated in February 2010.

== Retirement ==
Since 2018, the oldest locomotives in the 1144.0 series (commissioned from 1978 as 1044.0) have been decommissioned and used as spare parts donors when they reach the mileage limit at which a partial repair would be due. In the fall of 2018, 1144 004 and 005 were decommissioned, stripped of all components that could be used as spare parts and scrapped in the winter of 2020/2021. By mid-2020, around 20 locomotives were already withdrawn from service due to pending partial repairs or major damage (039 and 107 after accident damage, 031 and 096 after transformer damage). By 2021, a total of 55 locomotives had been taken out of service.

== Potential sale to Turkey ==
Numerous other locomotives were taken out of service in 2020. Together with most of the previously decommissioned locomotives, 50 were to be converted to a catenary voltage of 25 kV 50 Hz for use in Africa and then transferred to Turkey, where they were to be used by a construction company. The large-scale decommissioning of the 1144 series was due in part to their higher energy consumption compared to a 10/1116 or an 1142. In March 2021, the sale project to Turkey failed and 1144 008, 015, 025, 027, 034, 035, 049, 057, 060, 064, 085 and 087 were put back into operation. Despite this brief resurfacing, the era of the first series has arguably come to an end.

== Preserved locomotives ==
Some Locomotives have either been sold, while and some have already been sold to be shown in museums in either operational, static display or used on private railroads. 1044 501 and 1144 017 can be found at the Strasshof Railway Museum. 1144 006, 030, 032 and 096 were purchased by ProLok. 1144 096 is currently in Vienna Heiligenstadt (as of May 2024). 1144 003, 010, 019, 023, 020, 018, 045, and 024 were sold to Grenland Rail in Sweden and equipped with ETCS.

=== Radio remote control trials ===
Locomotives 1144 200 to 219 were equipped with radio remote control. This was intended to enable push-pull operation at the Brenner Pass without a connection with a UIC cable between the locomotives at the start and end of the train. However, as this technology was never approved, the antennas intended for this purpose were removed again.

== Accidents ==
=== Liechtenstein – Collision with Truck ===
On 26 February 1980, 1044.38 with train 416 collided with a truck on the railway crossing in Liechtenstein at km 11.305 between Feldkirch and Nendeln stations. The locomotive overturned. After being transferred to the main workshop in Linz, 1044.38 was taken out of service on 27 April 1981, after a total service life of eight months.

=== Neukirchen near Lambach, Upper Austria – Collision between express train and express train ===
On 18 September 1987, two express trains collided at Neukirchen near Lambach on the Westbahn. Three people people were killed and 101 injured. 1042 652 was scrapped, while 1044 092 was rebuilt with a new body; it was completed in 1989 and painted in a checkerboard design.

=== Wolfurt, Vorarlberg – Collision between express train and express train ===
On 29 August 1988, the "Pfänder" express train collided with an express train on the Lindau-Bludenz railroad line in Wolfurt. Five people lost their lives and 46 were injured, some of them seriously. The two locomotives ÖBB 1044 051 and 096 were severely damaged. Both locomotives were rebuilt with new bodies. 1044 051 was rebuilt with parts from the 1044.200 series and has since been used as 1044 256 and later 1044 200.

=== Bregenz, Vorarlberg – Collision between two express trains ===
On 30 August 1989, the express train "Montfort" with ÖBB 1044 023 and the Eurocity Bavaria with SBB Re 4/4 II 11197 collided south of Bregenz on the Lindau-Bludenz line. One passenger was killed, 16 people were injured, some seriously, and several others were slightly injured. 1044 023 was rebuilt with a new body.

=== Melk, Lower Austria – Head-on collision at Melk station ===
On 13 February 1993, a freight train, hauled by ÖBB 1010 008, passed a caution signal when entering Melk station. The driver noticed this and pressed the caution button on the Indusi, but did not reduce the speed of his train. As the train was traveling at 90 km/h as scheduled and the monitoring speed of the Indusi version at the time was also only 90 km/h, no emergency braking was applied. The driver only realized his mistake shortly before the stop signal and initiated emergency braking. Despite this, the freight train collided with a crossing express train, hauled by the almost brand-new 1044 241. Three people were killed and around 20 others injured in the head-on collision. 1044 241 was irreparably damaged. However, the staff at the main workshop in Linz managed to build a second unit for the 1044 241 from the remaining accident body of the 1044 043, various spare parts and a huge amount of time. This could be put into service around six years after the fatal accident.

=== Braz, Vorarlberg – Collision with mudflow ===
In the early evening of 11 August 1995, heavy rain fell in Klostertal. As a result, a mudflow broke away from the mountainside and made its way down into the valley in the area of the Masonbach stream. The bridge of the Arlbergbahn over this stream was swept away as IC 566 approached. Despite initiating emergency braking, the driver was unable to stop the train in time. The leading locomotive, 1044 047, and the first three-passenger carriages fell into the bed of the stream. Four people died. The locomotive was scrapped on the spot after the removal of reusable parts.

=== Garmisch-Partenkirchen, Bavaria – Head-on collision with observation railcar ===
On 12 December 1995, Regional Express 3612, hauled by locomotive 1044 235, was scheduled to cross paths with the Glass Train at Garmisch-Partenkirchen station. However, at the end of the RE's scheduled stop of 10 minutes, the Transparent Train had not yet arrived at the station and RE 3612 had not yet been given permission to leave in the direction of Munich. The driver of the RE came back to the train from a coffee break at departure time but did not see the exit signal that still said "stop" from his position and gave the driver the departure order. However, as the driver was not paying attention to the exit signal and the slip path at this point was not long enough, the two trains collided head-on despite emergency braking. One person was killed and several dozen were injured as a result. The glass train was severely damaged on the side of the drive bogie. The repair failed due to the high costs and as a result, it was taken out of service on 31 December 1997. 1044, only relatively slightly damaged by the accident, was repaired and put back into service.

=== Mühldorf, Carinthia – Collision between two freight trains ===
On 7 September 1999, two freight trains (hauled by 1044 022 and 1044 072) collided on the Tauernbahn at Mühldorf-Möllbrücke station. One locomotive driver died, and the second escaped with minor injuries. The 1044 022 had to be withdrawn.

=== Mallnitz, Carinthia – Car loading train collides with freight train ===
On 7 July 2000, a car loading train of the Tauernschleuse collided with a freight train at Mallnitz station on the Tauernbahn in the early hours of the morning. The driver of the Tauernschleuse locomotive and three truck drivers were slightly injured. The 1044 076 involved was then scrapped.

=== Wampersdorf, Lower Austria – Brake failure of a freight train ===
On 26 February 2002, a freight train consisting of 28 wagons Sopron-Ebenfurth-Vienna Central Station, hauled by ÖBB 1142 685, collided with a rolling road (RoLa) loaded with 21 trucks, hauled by ÖBB 1044 213, on the Pottendorf line in Wampersdorf. The accompanying couchette wagon of the RoLa was completely destroyed. Of the 21 truck drivers, 6 were killed and 15 were injured, some seriously. The cause of the accident was brake failure. Already on the journey from Sopron to Ebenfurth, the train showed poor braking performance because the last two wagons were not connected to the air brakes. Because the brake test had not been carried out correctly in Ebenfurth after the change of direction, the closed brake tap from the second to the third carriage was not noticed. The 1044 213 was mainly damaged on both fronts in the accident. In the course of the accident repairs at the main workshop in Linz, the locomotive was rebuilt as 1144 213.

=== Brenner, Tyrol – Unoccupied locomotives at the Brenner ===
On 10 February 2014, two unoccupied locomotives of the 189 series from Lokomotion and Rail Traction Company rolled off the Brennersee RoLa terminal and crashed into the escort car and the pusher locomotive 1144 of a RoLa train. 1144 281 fell down an embankment and scraped along the station building. The route for the pusher locomotive was set to a dead-end track and not to the main track with a 23% gradient. The locomotive was repaired and since then has no longer had a console for the third tail light on one side.

=== Allentsteig, Lower Austria – REX collides with articulated lorry ===
On 25 September 2015, REX 2150 Vienna-Gmünd collided with a semi-trailer carrying an 18-ton timber harvesting machine at a railroad crossing just before Allentsteig station on the Franz-Josefs-Bahn. The driver died at the scene of the accident, while the driver of the semi-trailer was able to escape from the driver's cab before the accident. The accident locomotive 1144 286 was repaired in the main workshop in Linz.

=== Breitenstein, Lower Austria – Rolling back freight train collides with auxiliary locomotive ===
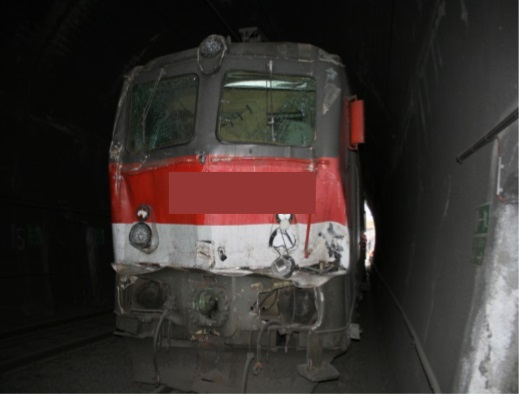
The crushed cab of 1144 282

On 1 December 2015, a timber train travelling uphill on the Semmering Railway before Semmering station was separated because it was 205 tons heavier than permitted. A following container train, also heading towards Semmering, was stopped at the previous self-block signal. The 1144 282, which was on its way from Mürzzuschlag to Gloggnitz, was let into the occupied track section from Breitenstein station as a secondary run to pull the container train back to Breitenstein. Although the locomotive had not yet reached the end of the train, the driver of the container train released the brakes while half asleep, whereupon the train started to move and collided with the adjacent train in the Polleroswand tunnel. 14 container wagons were derailed and the locomotive, track, overhead line, and signaling systems in the tunnel suffered severe damage. The material damage amounted to around three million euros. The driver of the train traveling alongside was seriously injured. The Semmering Railway had to be closed for around two weeks.

=== Vienna Meidling – Shunting run collides with Railjet ===
On 15 April 2017, a shunting train consisting of 1144 106 and a double-decker push-pull train ran into the flank of a Railjet from Vienna to Lienz. The driver of the shunting train had previously disregarded a shunting signal. The last 4 wagons derailed and almost completely overturned. As a result, 16 people were injured.

=== Haiding, Upper Austria – Driverless regional train stopped with cleared train ===
On 30 October 2017, an empty regional train set rolled out of Neumarkt-Kallham station on the Wels-Passau line in the direction of Wels. The dispatcher noticed the incident, whereupon fire departments secured the level crossings. The runaway train was stopped after a 20-kilometer "ghost run" by a 5022 railcar, which had previously been cleared at Haiding station. ÖBB estimated the damage caused at several hundred thousand euros. The locomotive involved, 1144 259, has been repaired.

== Gallery ==
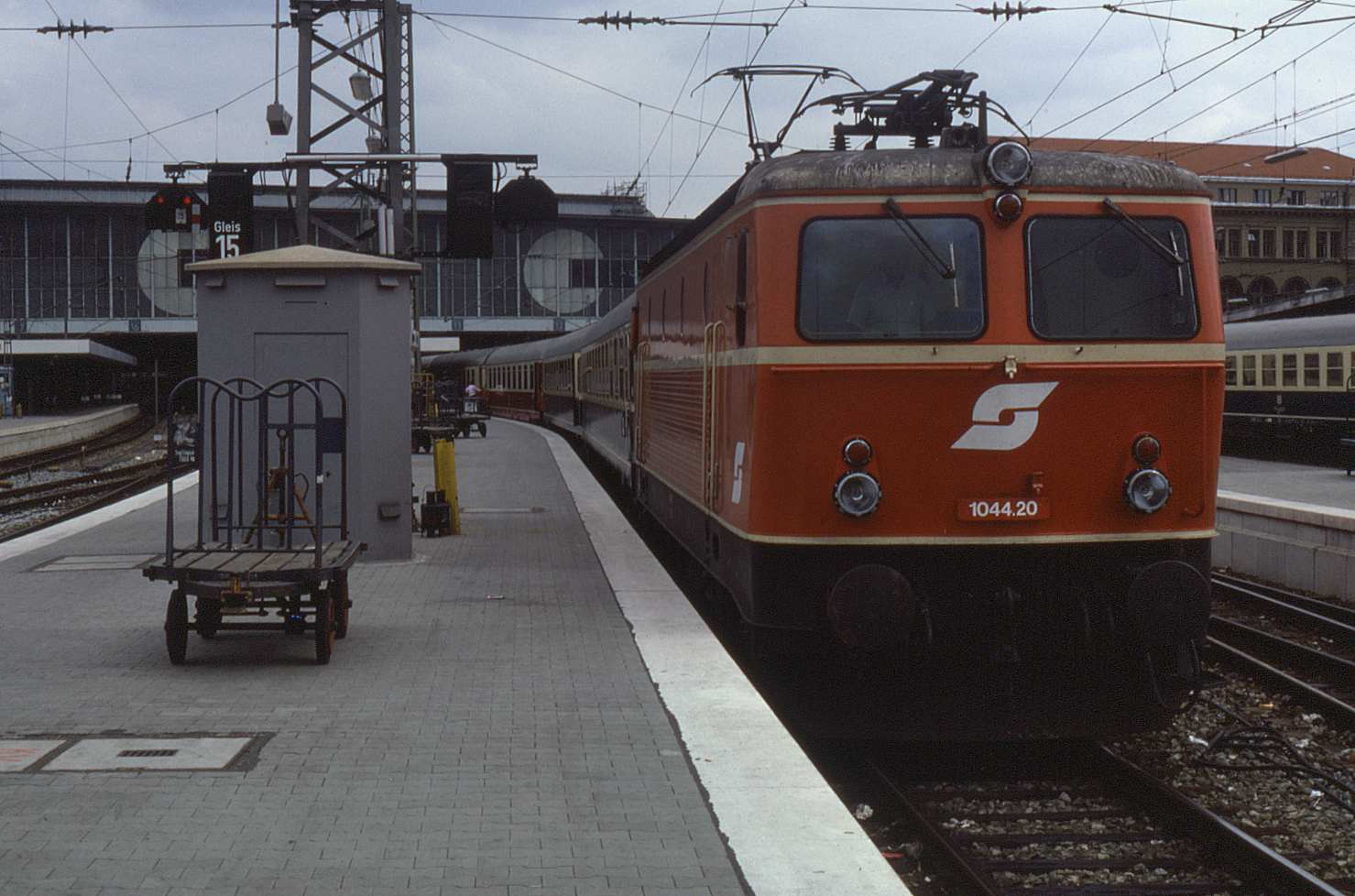
1044.20 in the typical 1980s livery at München Hauptbahnhof in 1985 with an express train.

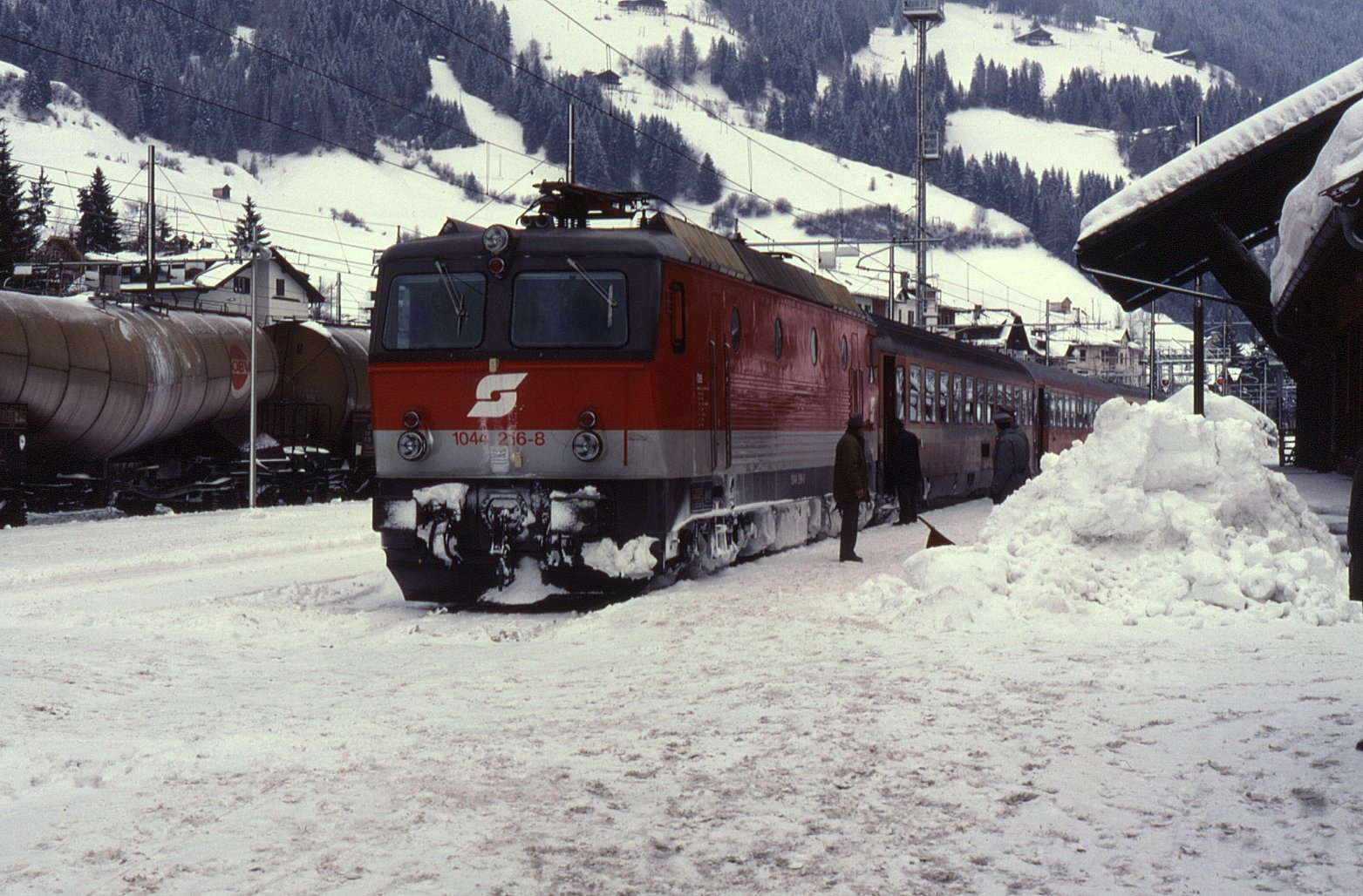
1044.216 with the current livery that was introduced on the second subseries in 1989 at San Candido, Italy in 1991.

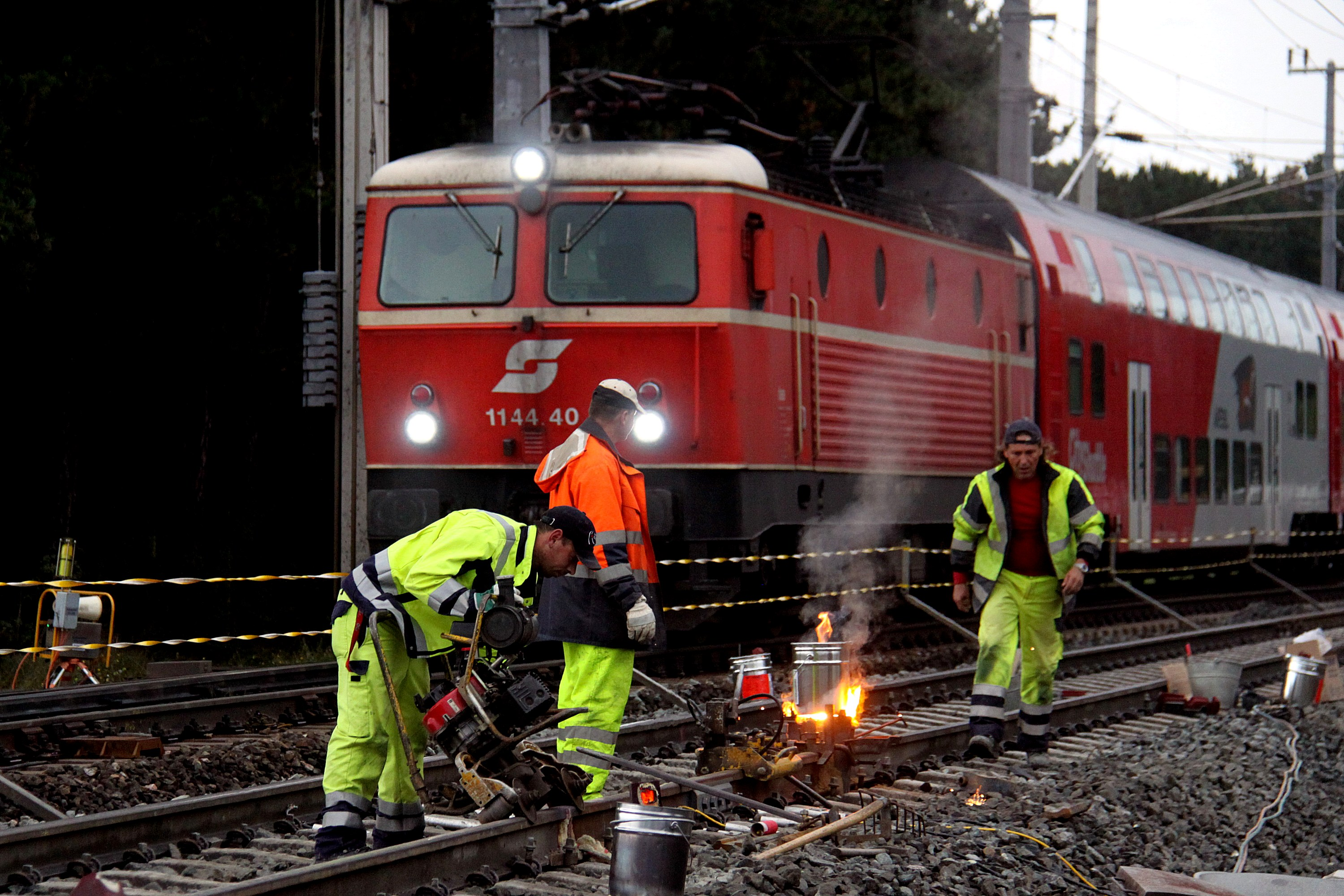
1144.40 spotting the retro-design in Jaffa orange at Neunkirchen, 2014.

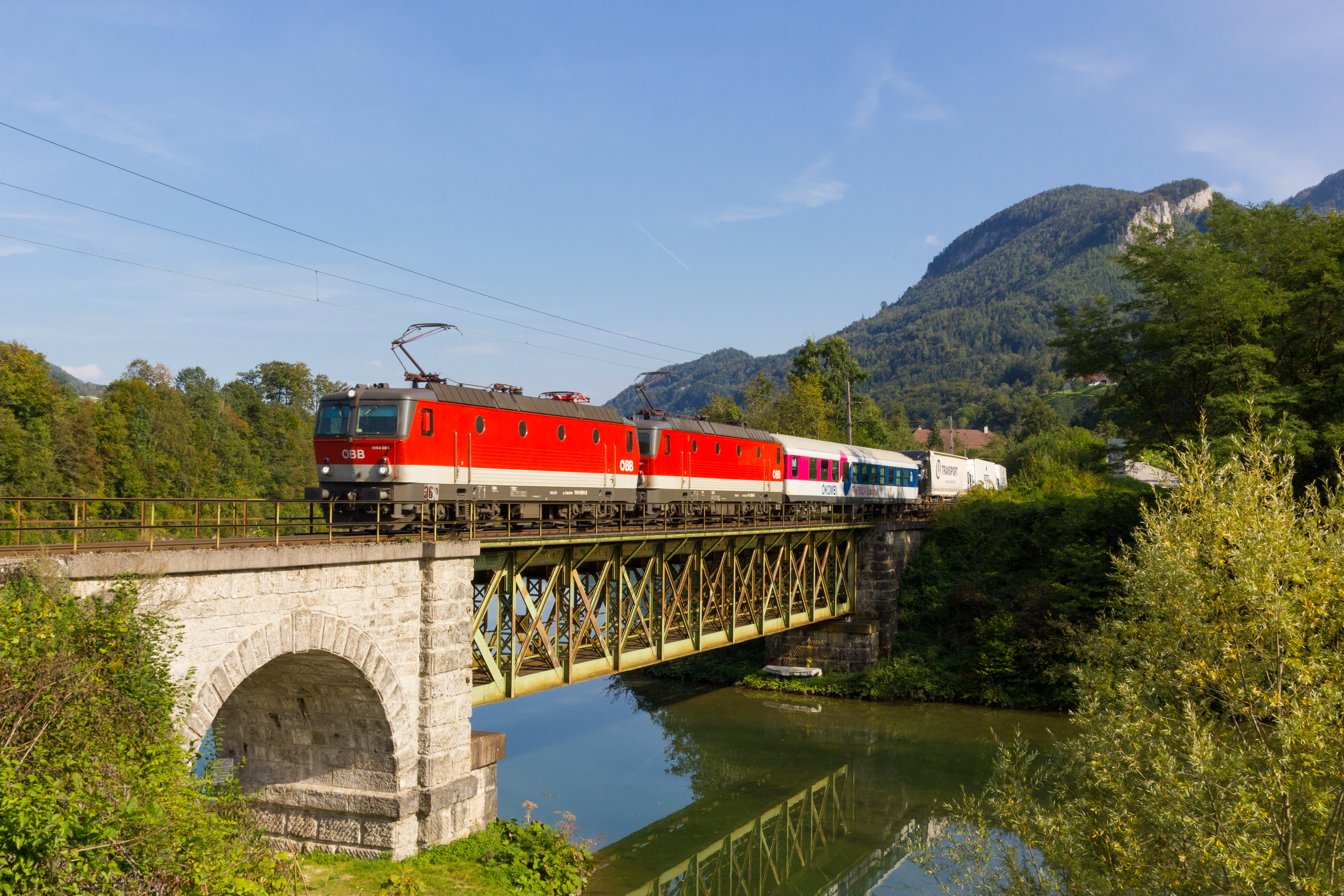
1144.094 and 1144.256 with a Ro-La train at Trattenbach, 2016.

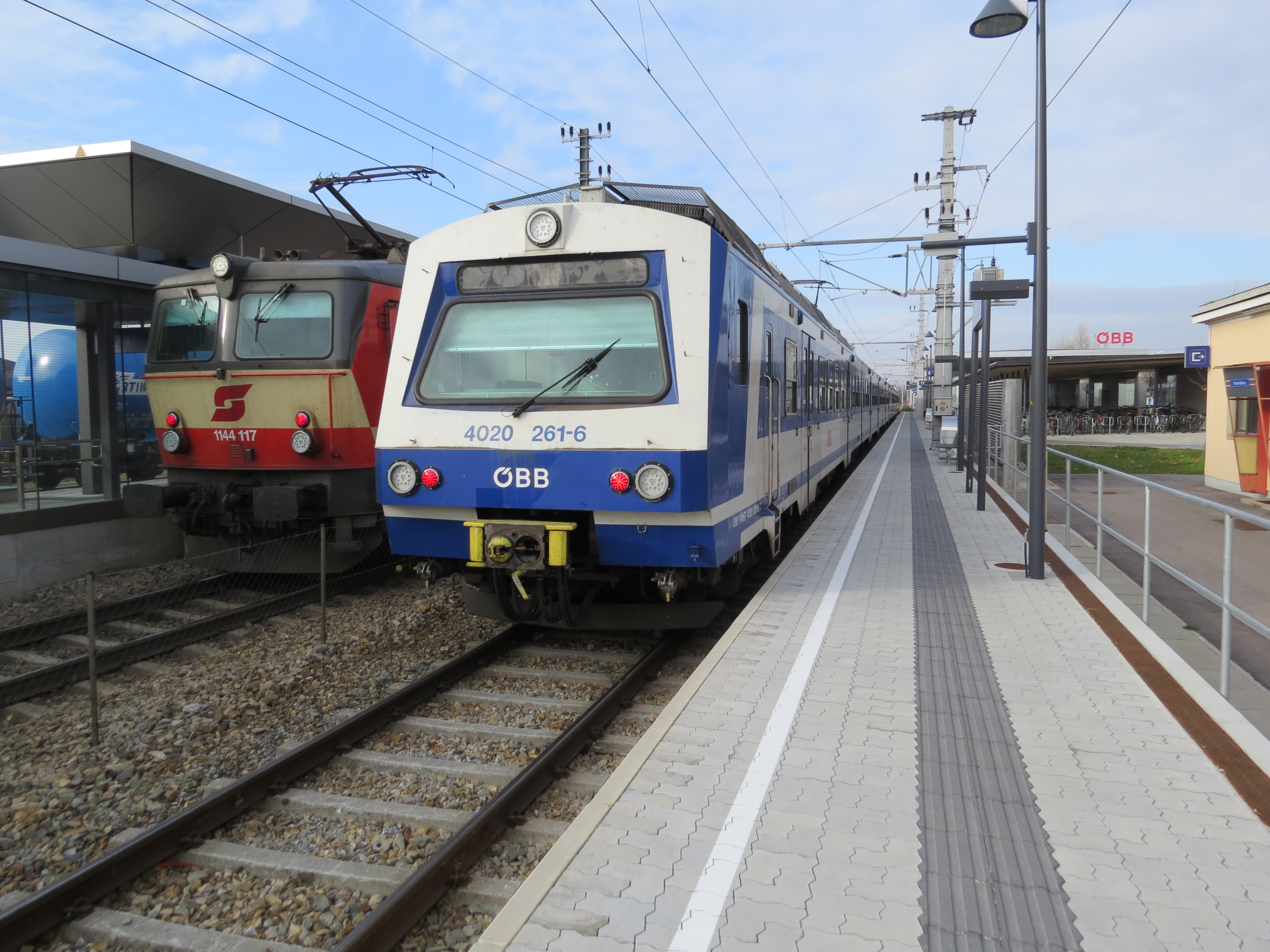
1144.117 in the Schachbrett design at Korneuburg, 2017.

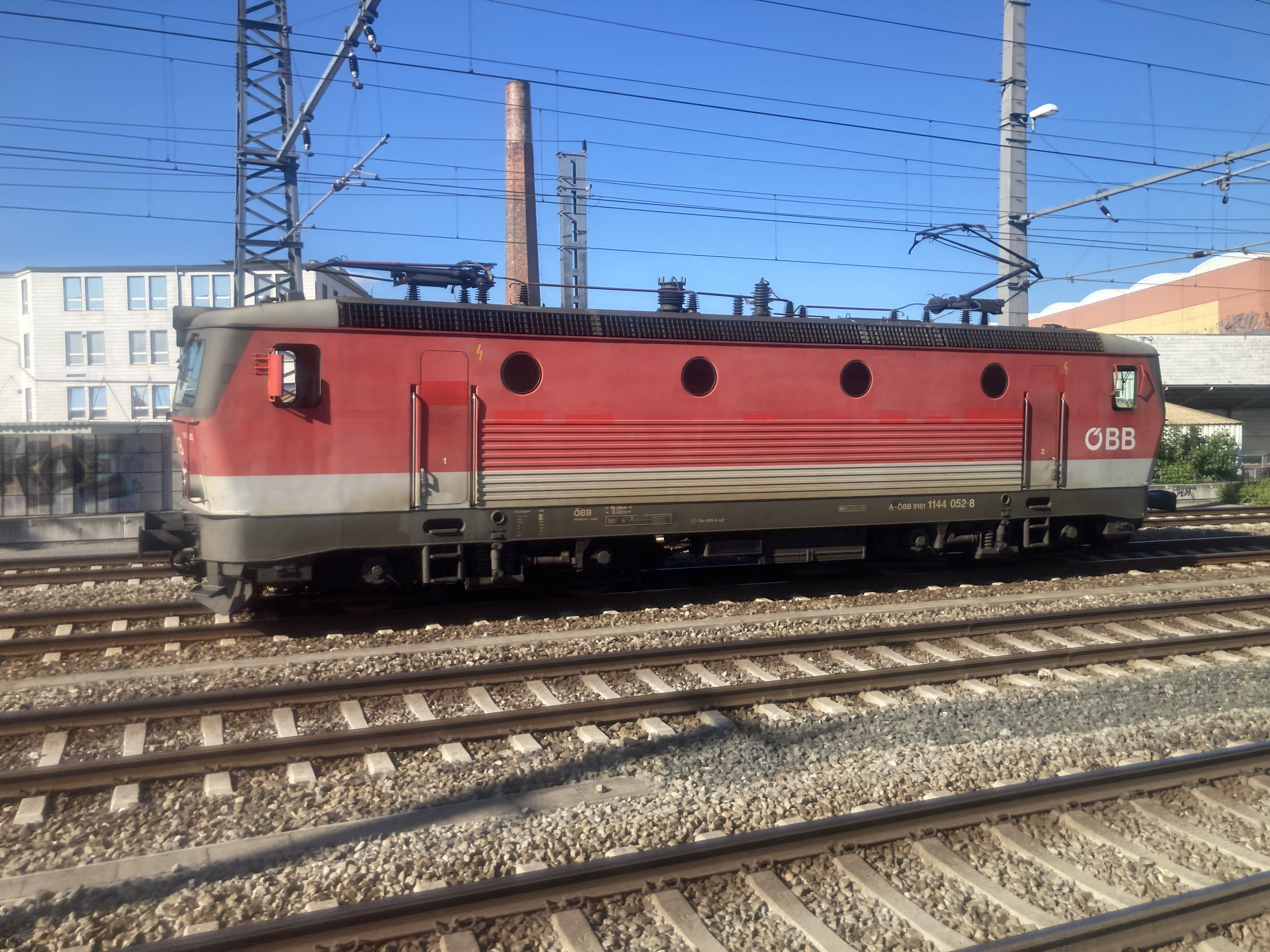
1144 052 in a train yard; this locomotive has the original (smaller) ventilation intakes on the sides

== See also ==
- History of rail transport in Austria
- List of locomotive builders
- Rail transport in Austria
