= DRG Class ET 91 =

Baureihe ET 91
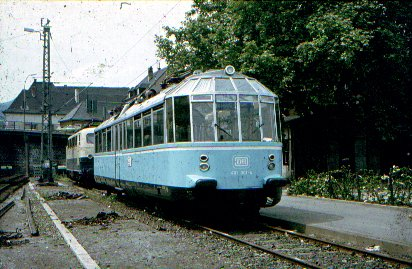
- Glass train 491 001-4 (ex ET 91 01) c. 1978
- In service: 1935–1995
- Manufacturer: Waggonfabrik Fuchs, AEG
- Constructed: 1935–1936
- Scrapped: 1943 (1)
- Number built: 2
- Number preserved: 1
- Number scrapped: 1
- Fleet numbers: ET 91 01 – ET 91 02
- Capacity: 70
- Operators: Deutsche Reichsbahn-Gesellschaft, Deutsche Bundesbahn

Specifications
- Car length: over buffers: 20.6 m (67 ft 7 in)
- Maximum speed: 110 km/h (68 mph)
- Weight: 51 tonnes (50 long tons; 56 short tons)
- Acceleration: max. starting: 0.58 m/s^{2} (1.9 ft/s^{2})
- Electric system(s): 15 kV 16 2/3 Hz AC catenary
- Current collector(s): Pantograph
- UIC classification: Bo′2′
- Track gauge: 1,435 mm (4 ft 8 1/2 in) standard gauge

The Baureihe ET 91 was a series of electric multiple units built for the Deutsche Reichsbahn-Gesellschaft of Germany. The units colloquially known as Gläserner Zug (Glass Train) were equipped with large panorama windows, providing an excellent outside view to the passengers. The vehicles were used for recreational trips only, especially in southern Germany and Austria.

== History ==
Two units with the wheel arrangement Bo'2' were built in 1935 by Waggonfabrik Fuchs in Heidelberg and AEG. They were numbered elT 1998 (cream with red underside) and 1999 (dark green with yellow (lower) and grey (upper) window wrap).

ET 91 02 was destroyed on March 9, 1943, in a bomb attack on the Munich shunting yard. ET 91 01 survived World War II without major damage and was taken over by the Deutsche Bundesbahn From 1968 on, it was listed as Baureihe 491 in the DB numbering scheme, being assigned the number 491 001-4.

The train had been refurbished 5 times during its lifetime (1949, 1953, 1961, 1972, 1985), and suffered a number of changes to its livery. Between 1949 and 1953 it wore the Rheingold livery, that was grey underside, purple bodywork and cream wrap. Between 1953 and 1971 it had a black underside (standard underside paint still used today), maroon bodywork and custard window wrap. Between 1972 and 1985 this livery is changed to light blue bodywork and silver wrap. The last livery was applied from 1985 to 1995 (technically speaking it is still used today) and featured a marine dark bodywork and white window wrap.

On December 12, 1995, the remaining unit suffered extensive damage in a frontal crash at Garmisch-Partenkirchen with 1044 235 of the Austrian Federal Railways and was subsequently taken out of service. The unit has been stationed at the Bahnpark Augsburg in Augsburg since May 2005.

The unit is currently being renovated, however, due to economical reasons it will not be put into a usable state again, the power bogie having been destroyed in the 1995 accident.

== Literature ==
- Horst Troche: 60 Jahre im Betriebseinsatz: Der "Gläserne Zug". In: Eisenbahn-Kurier. No. 281/30/1996. EK-Verlag GmbH, ISSN 0170-5288, pp. 24–29.
- Horst Troche: Die elektrischen Aussichtstriebwagen der Deutschen Bundesbahn ISBN 3-921700-33-7
