= Schrammacher =

Mountain in Tyrol, Austria

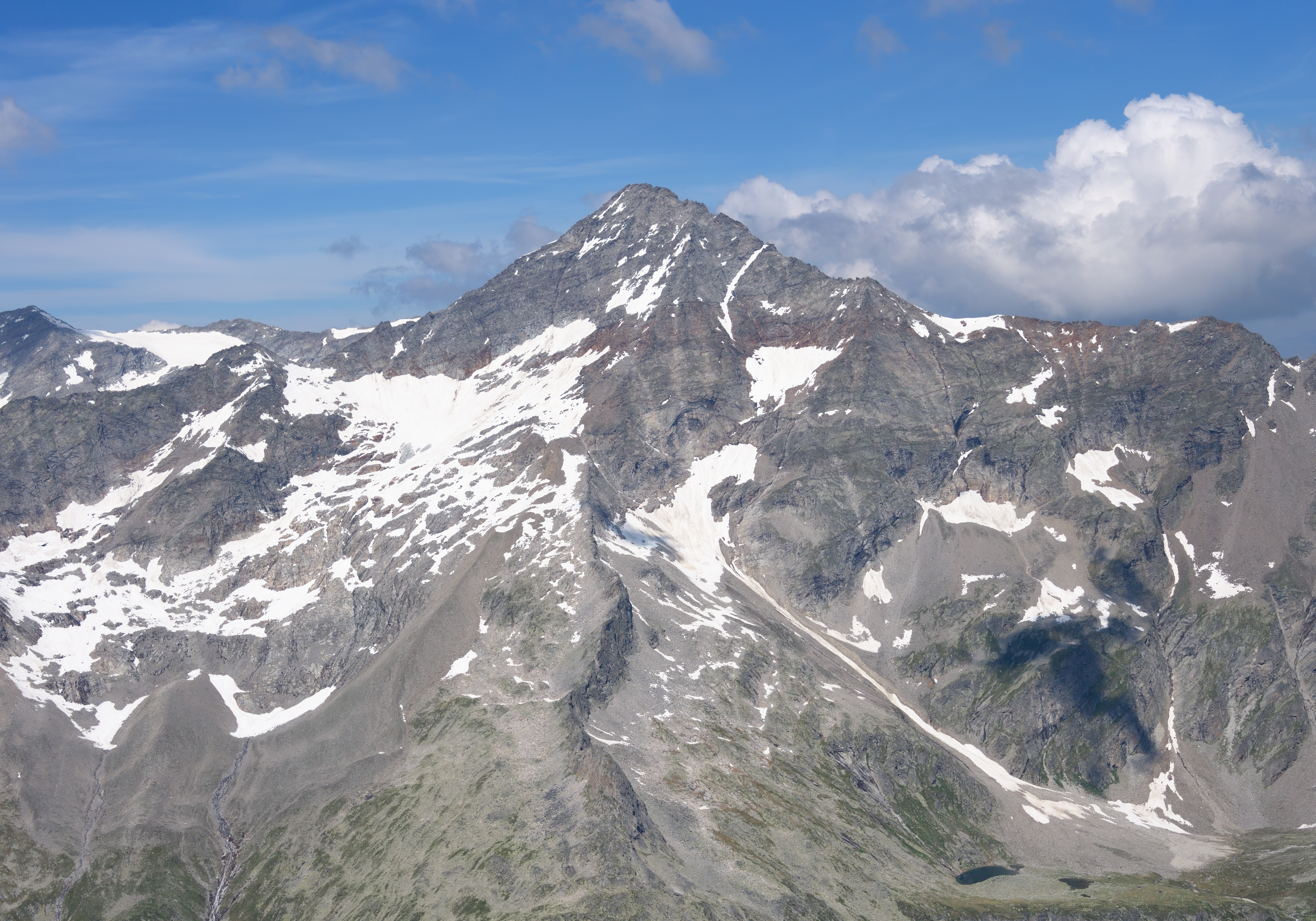
- Aerial view of Schrammacher from the east

Highest point
- Elevation: 3,410 m (11,190 ft)
- Prominence: 451 m (1,480 ft)
- Parent peak: Olperer
- Listing: Alpine mountains above 3000 m
- Coordinates: 47°01′37″N 11°38′34″E

Geography
- Location within Austria
- Location: Tyrol, Austria
- Parent range: Zillertal Alps

Climbing
- First ascent: 19 August 1847 Peter Karl Thurwieser, Georg Lechner and Jakob Huber
- Easiest route: South ridge from the Pfitscherjochhaus (UIAA I-II)

The Schrammacher is a mountain in the Austrian state of Tyrol. At 3,410 or 3,411 m it is, after the Olperer, the second highest peak of the Tux ridge of the Zillertal Alps. With its horn shape and its steep and smooth northwest wall the mountain is imposing from several directions.

== Location ==
The Schrammacher is 4 km north-northwest of the Pfitscherjoch (on the border of Italy and Austria) and 4 kilometers west of the Schlegeis reservoir at the head of the Zillertal. The Alpeiner Scharte (2,969 m) to the north connects Schrammacher to Fußstein and Olperer, while to the west the adjacent summit is the Sagwandspitze (3,224 m), where the ridge turns south and continues to the Hohe Wand (3,289 m) on the Austrian-Italian border. The East flank descends 1600 m into the ‘’Zamser Grund”” valley, while the 900 m high, steep northwest face, made of slabby rock, dominates the head of the Alpeiner and Vals valleys to the west. Three glaciers remain on the mountain: the Alpeiner Ferner at the bottom of the northwest wall, the Oberschrammacher Ferner on the southeast slope, and the large Stampflkees to the southwest.

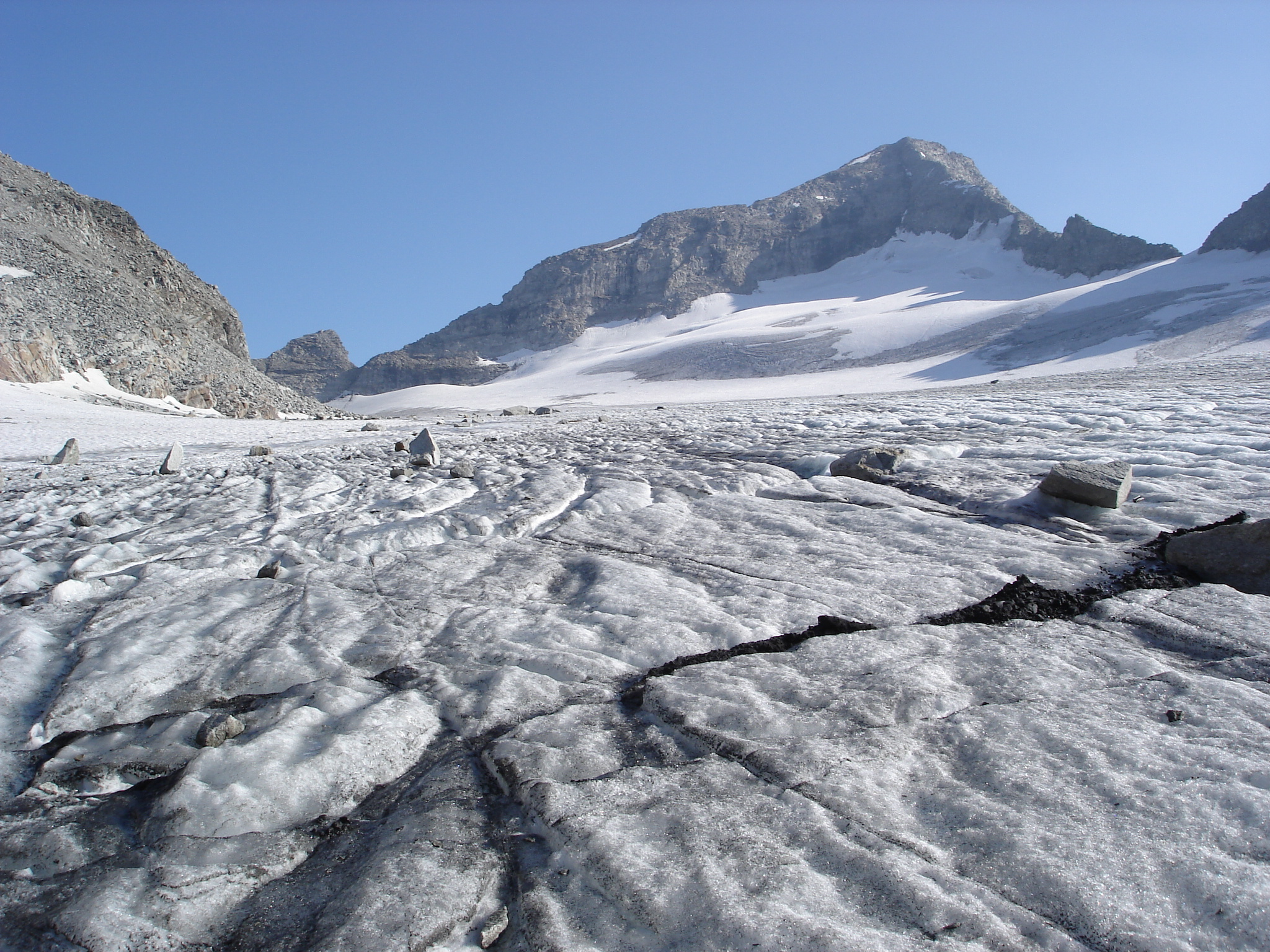
Schrammacher over the Stampflkees. The normal rout goes over the south ridge on the right

== First ascent ==
The first ascent took place on August 19, 1847, when the meteorologist, theology professor and mountaineer Peter Karl Thurwieser from Salzburg and the local guides Georg Lechner ("Schneider-Jörgl") and Jakob Huber ("Gainer-Jakl") from Mayrhofen reached the summit from an alp just north of the Pfitscherjoch over the south ridge. Though an account was published in 1847, this ascent was apparently forgotten by the mountaineering society and in 1875 the journal of the German and Austrian Alpine Club reported a first ascent the previous year by the Hungarian scientist and mountaineer Maurice of Dechy of Pest and the Sulden mountain guide Hans Pinggera. This oversight was only rectified in 1901 in the same journal, and the 1874 ascent is still often quoted as the first.

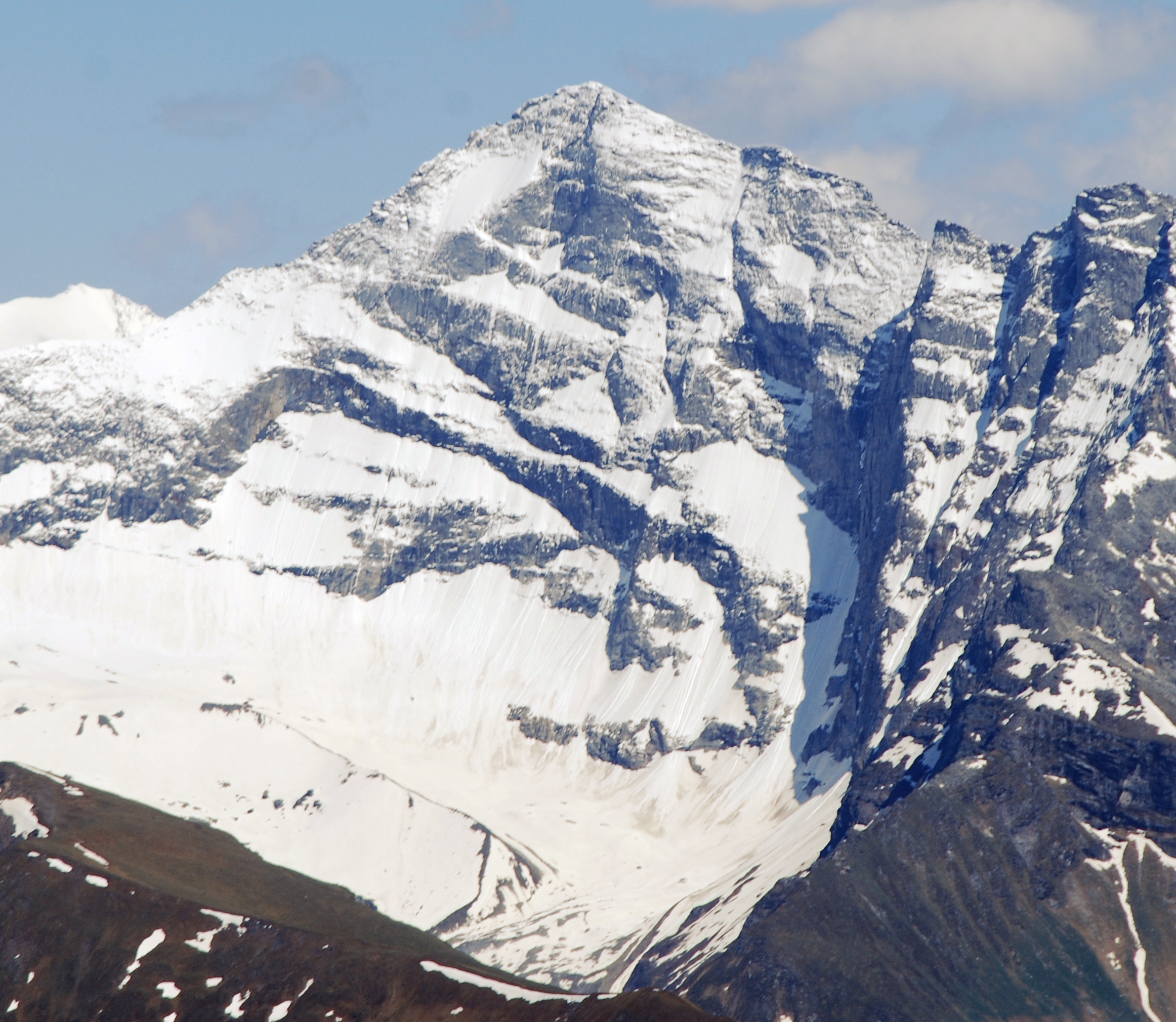
The Schrammacher northwest face as captured from the Lämpermahdspitze (2,595 m), 22 km away in the Stubai Alps

The first ascent of the northwest face by Fritz Drasch and Johannes Lechner on 25 September 1895 was well ahead of its time, foreshadowing the interest in climbing great north faces starting in the 1920s. In 1951, Hermann Buhl led the first winter ascent of this wall.

== Bases and routes ==
The normal route, and the route of both the 1847 and 1874 ascents, leads from the Pfitscherjoch hut (Pfitscherjochhaus) at 2,248 meters north-northeast across the western edge of the Stampflkees (glacier). The route continues on the south ridge to the summit in moderately difficult climbing (UIAA I-II) in a good 5 hours. Other bases from which Schrammacher is climbed are the Olpererhütte (2,389 m, west above the Schlegeis reservoir) and the Gera hut (2,324 m) at the end of Valser valley. The routes from here take over 6 hours and there is an increased risk of rock falls below the Schrammacher walls.
