= Hatzlacke =

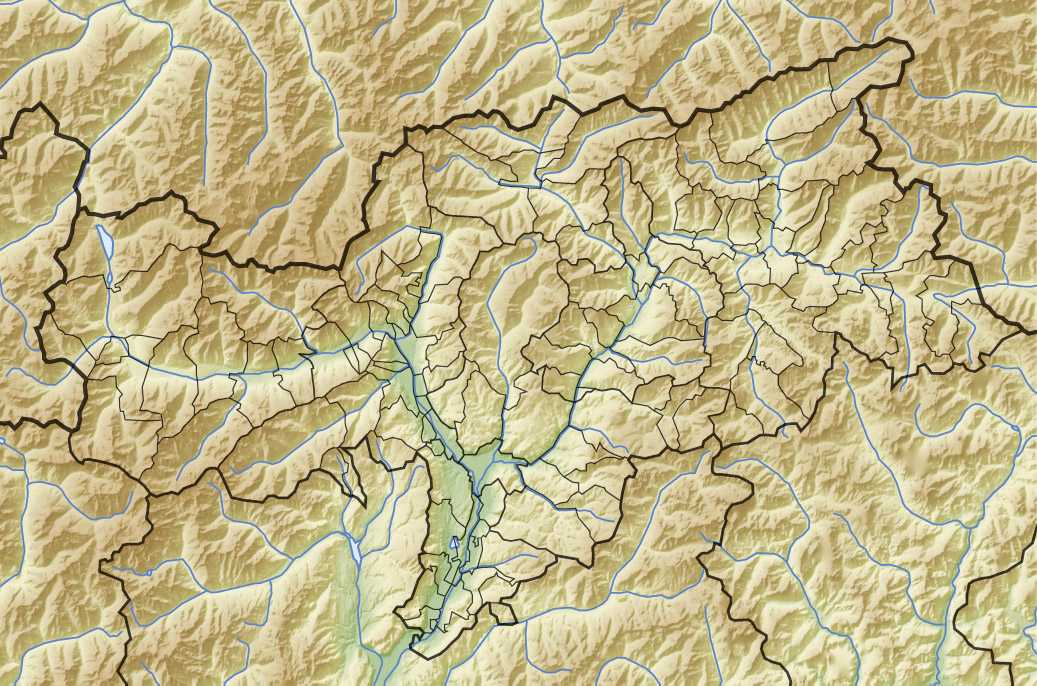
- Location within South Tyrol
- Location: near Sand in Taufers, South Tyrol (Italy)
- Coordinates: 46°58′10″N 11°32′37″E
- Type: Mountain lake
- Basin countries: Italy
- Surface area: 1.04 ha (2.6 acres)
- Average depth: 3 m (9.8 ft)
- Water volume: 31,160.70 m^{3} (25.26239 acre⋅ft)
- Surface elevation: 1,850 m (6,070 ft)
- Settlements: Kematen

The Hatzlacke Lake is located on the southern side of the Zillertaler Alps in the province of South Tyrol, Italy. The small lake can only be reached on foot from Kematen near Sand in Taufers via travel route 5. It lies 1 kilometres north of the village on 1850 metres Sea Level.

The clear water of the mountain lake has a tremendous drinking water quality but is chilly even in Summer at a maximum of 12 – 14 °C. Small kinds of trouts are living in the water. The Lake hasn’t any in- and outflows and is mainly supplied with fresh water by rain or snow melting.

== See also ==
- Grafsee
