= Brenner Lake (Minnesota) =

Lake in the state of Minnesota, United States

- Location within Minnesota
- Location: Kandiyohi County, Minnesota
- Coordinates: 45°23′49″N 95°14′14″W
- Type: Lake
- Surface elevation: 1,207 feet (368 m)

Brenner Lake is a lake in Kandiyohi County, in the U.S. state of Minnesota.

Brenner Lake was named for Andreas Hanson Brenner, an early settler.

== See also ==
- List of lakes in Minnesota
