= Erker =

Erker is a surname. Notable people with the surname include:

- August Erker (1879–1951), American rower
- Johann Erker (1773–1809), Austrian rebel leader

== See also ==
- Bay window
