= Vals, Tyrol =

Vals
- Municipality
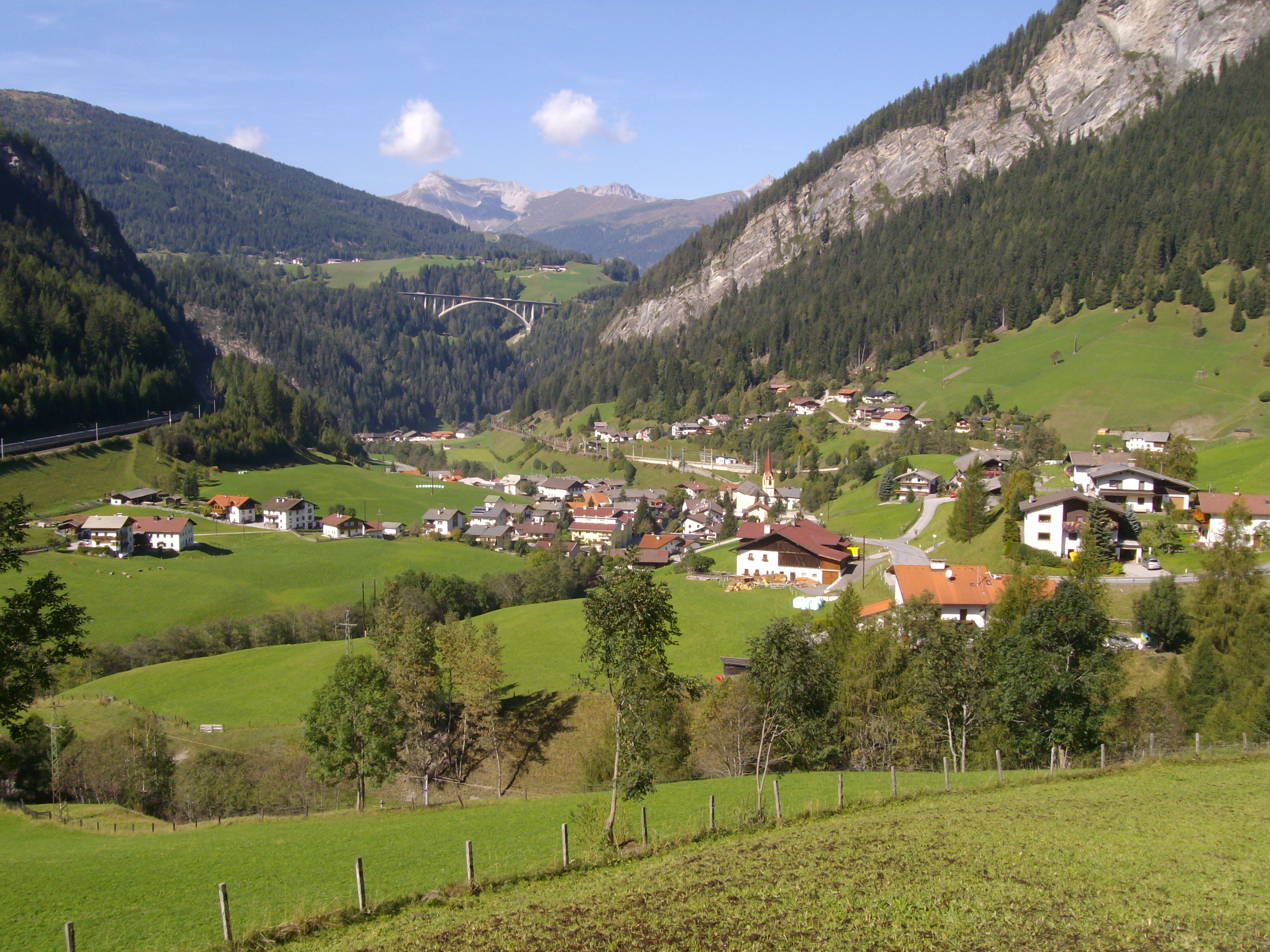

- Coat of arms

- Location within Austria
- Coordinates: 47°03′45″N 11°30′02″E
- Country: Austria
- State: Tyrol
- District: Innsbruck Land

Government
  - Mayor: Klaus Ungerank

Area
  - Total: 48.71 km^{2} (18.81 sq mi)
- Elevation: 1,129 m (3,704 ft)

Population (2018-01-01)
  - Total: 532
  - Density: 10.9/km^{2} (28.3/sq mi)
- Time zone: UTC+1 (CET)
  - Summer (DST): UTC+2 (CEST)
- Postal code: 6152
- Area code: 05279
- Vehicle registration: IL
- Website: www.vals.at

Vals is a municipality in the southern Innsbruck-Land District in the Austrian state of Tyrol.

== Geography ==
Vals is located 26 km southeast of Innsbruck in an incorporated valley with the same name (Valsertal), which branches off from the eastern side of Wipptal at Stafflach, is joined by the Schmirntal at Sankt Jodok, whose southern part also belongs to the municipality of Vals, and borders to Italy at its south end. The valley stretches out to the Ziller Valley Alps (Zillertal) for about seven kilometers and ends with the peaks Kaser, Olperer, Schrammacher and Hohe Wand. The valley is crossed by the stream Valser and its tributaries Alpeiner, Tscheisch and Paduaner.

== History ==
=== Origin ===
The region was once used by Roman farmers as a pasture, and the first documented mention dates back to 1313, under the name "Valles" derived from the Latin "Vallis". From the Middle Ages, marble was extracted from here and used for the floors of the Imperial Palace and the Cathedral of Innsbruck. In 1809 the entire Wipptal and some adjacent valleys were the scene of the Battle of Bergisel between the Tyrolese against the Kingdom of Bavaria and the First French Empire. In 1941 the entire valley was declared a nature reserve and despite this, in May 1942 during the Second World War, under the saddle Alpeiner at 2950 m., a tunnel system was bored for the extraction of molybdenum. Under the command of the Wehrmacht, prisoners of war and others were exploited for forced labour there.

=== Coat-of-arms ===
The emblem of Vals consists of a red shield with a black V on the top including a golden crown, which is referred to as that of St. Jodok.
