= Waggonfabrik Fuchs =

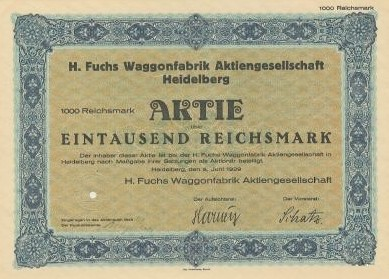
A Waggonfabrik Fuchs share certificate

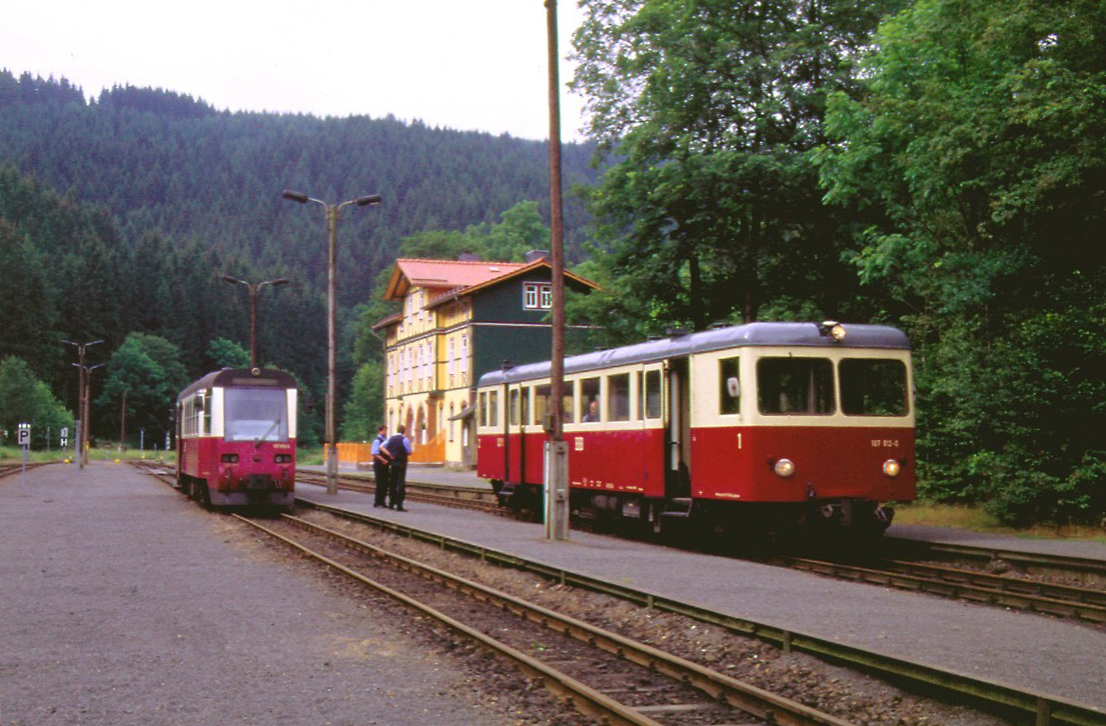
The Fuchs railbus 187 012, built 1955, in Eisfelder Talmühle

Waggonfabrik Fuchs ('Fuchs Coach Factory') was a German coach and wagon builders based in Heidelberg in the state of Baden-Württemberg in southwestern Germany. They built railway wagons and tramways from 1862 to 1957.

== History ==
The firm was founded in 1844 by Johann Schäfer in Heidelberg and was sold after his death in 1861 to Heinrich Fuchs, who formed the Waggonfabrik Heinrich Fuchs in 1862. Fuchs moved the factory from the district of Weststadt in Heidelberg to the neighboring district of Rohrbach (completed in 1902), in close proximity to the Heidelberg-Kirchheim/Rohrbach station.

In addition to railway wagons, in its early days the firm also built bridges and other facilities for the railways. Major customers for its wagons and coaches in the early years were the Baden State Railways.

From about 1901 the production of tramways began. Customers included the Elektrische Straßenbahn Heidelberg–Wiesloch, Heidelberger Straßen- und Bergbahn AG (HSB), Oberrheinische Eisenbahn-Gesellschaft (OEG), Rhein-Haardtbahn (RHB). Even U-Bahn trains were supplied for the Berlin U-Bahn and the glass train (Gläserne Zug).

Fuchs survived the two world wars, but only with heavy losses. Production had to be stopped or almost all its employees had to be made redundant on several occasions. Attempts were made to diversify to other products such as tractors or diggers, but with little success.

The company was taken over in 1930 by the Vereinigung Westdeutscher Waggonfabriken (Westwaggon) and the majority of shares sold in 1940 to the Dillinger Hütte that, due to its location in the Saargebiet, sold its share of Fuchs in 1957 to the International Harvester Company, who switched its production to combine harvesters.

== Today ==
In memory of Heinrich Fuchs, a street in the Heidelberg district of Rohrbach is named Heinrich-Fuchs-Straße.

Today the site of the former Waggonfabrik Fuchs factory is a modern housing estate Quartier am Turm ('tower district') and one of the largest property developments in the city. The architecture of the new district preserved the historical identity of the coach and wagon factory by making use of the existing characteristic structures.

== Sources ==
- Bernhard König: Schienenfahrzeugbau in Heidelberg, auf der Website der Eisenbahnfreunde Heidelberg e.V.. https://www.ef-heidelberg.de
- Bernhard König: Die Waggonfabrik Heinrich Fuchs in Heidelberg, in: BDEF-Jahrbuch 1990, Lübbecke 1990
- Lessing: Triebwagen-Design aus Heidelberg – Die H. Fuchs Waggonfabrik AG, in: Blum (Hrsg.): 'Pioniere aus Technik und Wirtschaft in Heidelberg', Aachen 2000.
- Bauträger E&K Immobilien: Von der Waggonfabrik zu neuem Lebensraum, auf der Website des Bauträgers zum neuen Quartier am Turm. http://www.ek-immobilien.de
