= Pfitscher Bach =

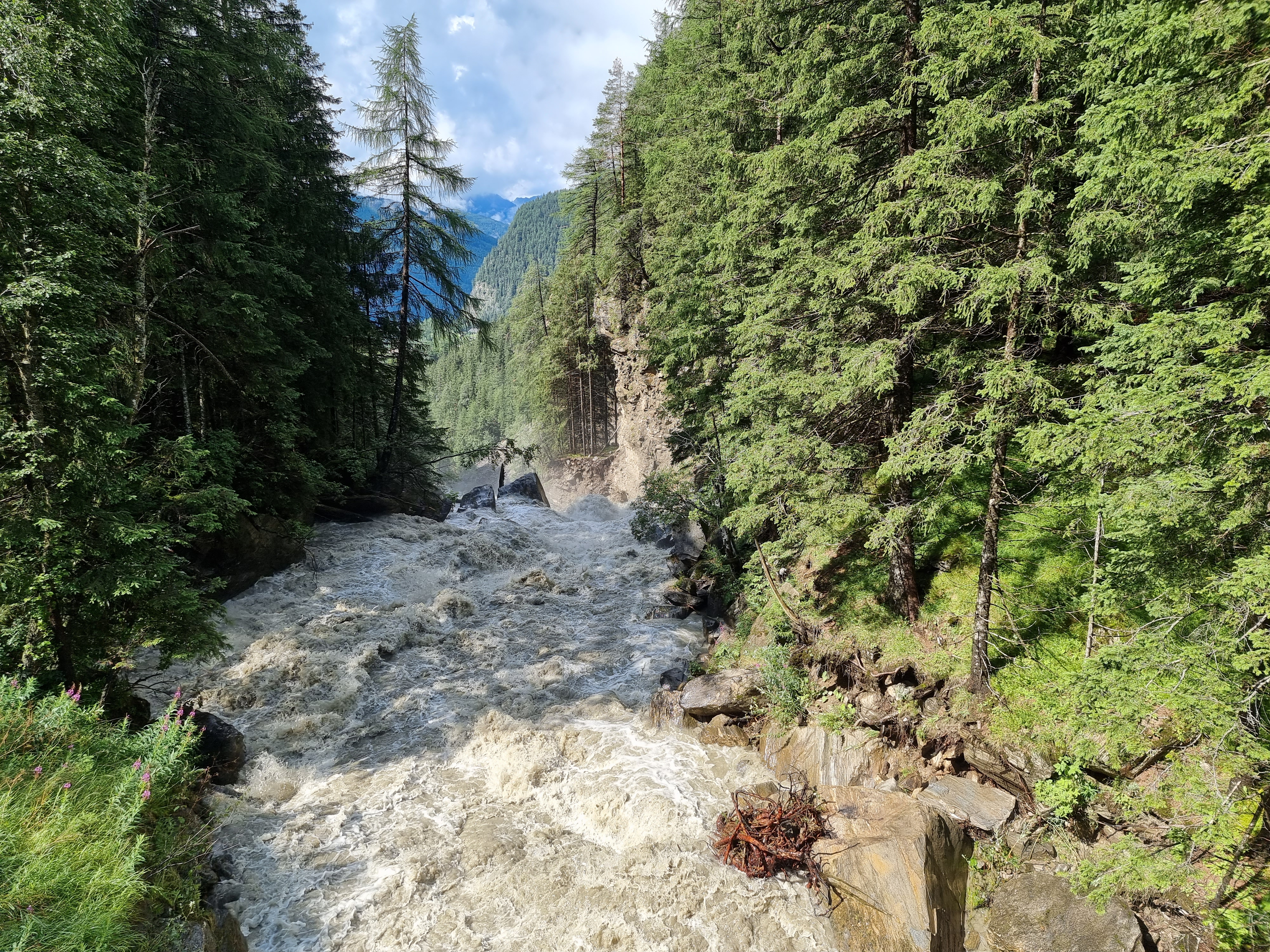

Location
- Country: Italy

Physical characteristics
- Source
  - location: Pfitscher Tal (South Tyrol)
- Mouth: Eisack
  - location: Sterzing
  - coordinates: 46°53′04″N 11°26′57″E
- Length: 27 km (17 mi)
- Basin size: 139.7 km^{2} (53.9 sq mi)

Basin features
- Progression: Eisack→ Adige→ Adriatic Sea

The Pfitscher Bach is a stream in South Tyrol, Italy. It flows into the Eisack in Sterzing.
