= Gries am Brenner =

- Municipality
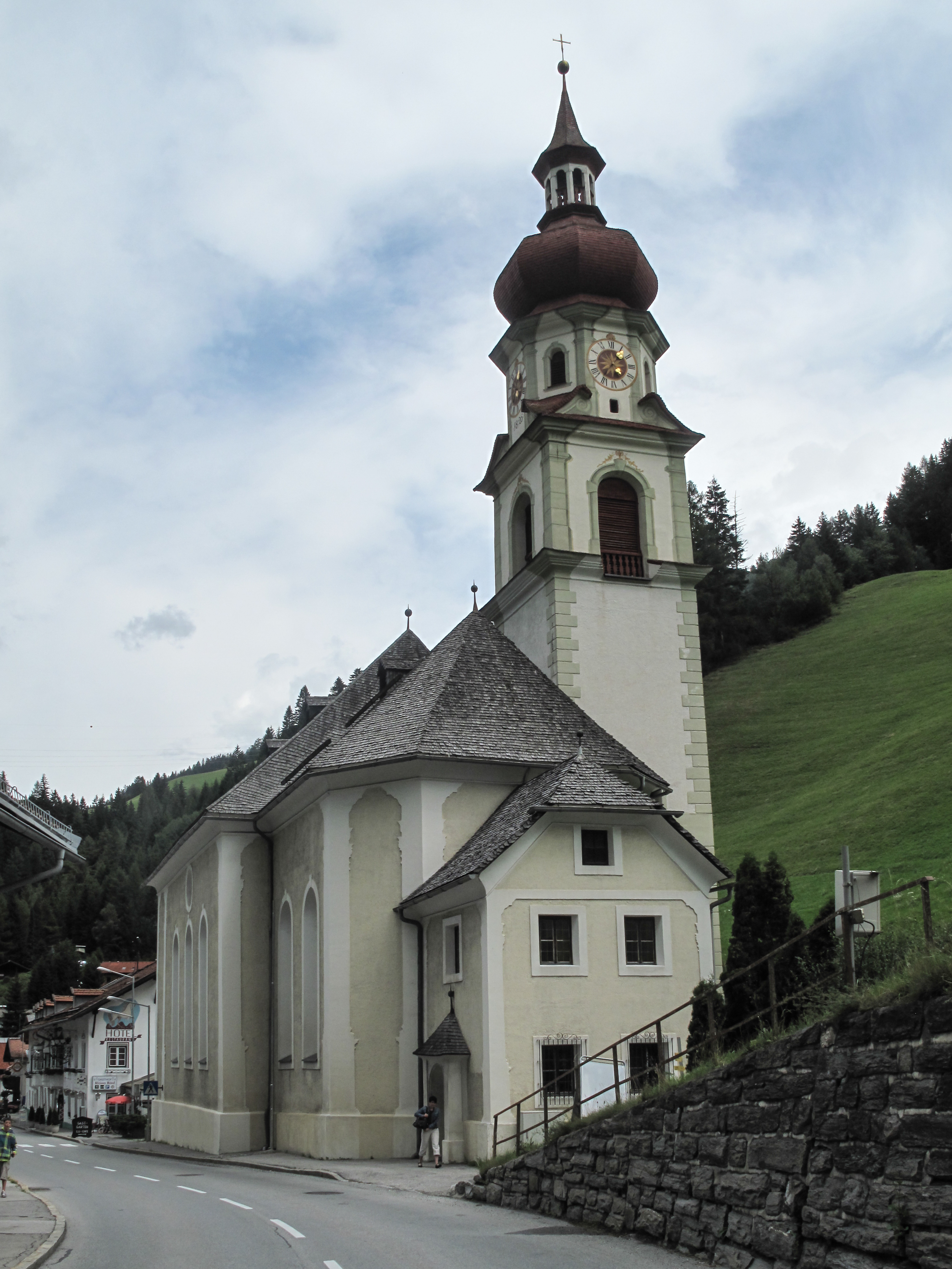

- Coat of arms

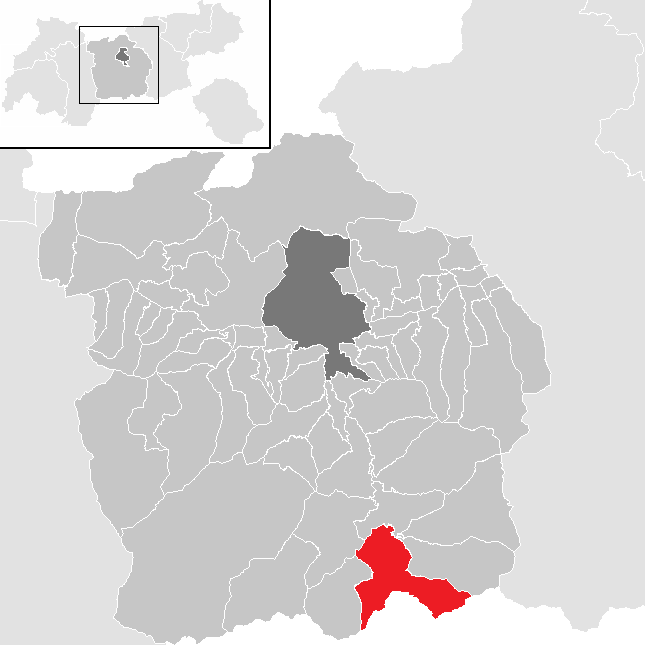
- Location in the district

- Location within Austria
- Coordinates: 47°02′00″N 11°28′00″E
- Country: Austria
- State: Tyrol
- District: Innsbruck Land

Government
  - Mayor: Karl Mühlsteiger (Offene Gemeindeliste Karl Mühlsteiger (OGKM))

Area
  - Total: 55.58 km^{2} (21.46 sq mi)
- Elevation: 1,165 m (3,822 ft)

Population (2021)
  - Total: 1,332
  - Density: 23.97/km^{2} (62.07/sq mi)
- Time zone: UTC+1 (CET)
  - Summer (DST): UTC+2 (CEST)
- Postal code: 6156
- Area code: 05274
- Vehicle registration: IL
- Website: www.gries-brenner.gv.at

Gries am Brenner, often referred to as simply Gries (German pronunciation: [ɡʁiːs]), is a municipality in the Wipptal in the southern district of Innsbruck-Land. The village consists of several hamlets.

== Geography ==
Gries am Brenner is located at the entrance of the Obernbergtal on the western side of the Wipptal. Here the valley widens enough to accommodate the village, the River Sill and the B182 road; the Brenner Railway runs along the eastern side and the motorway A13 on the western, are on a higher level. Also the Lake Brennersee lies on the area of the municipality.

== History ==
=== Origin ===
Gries during the Roman Empire was an important passageway station to the south, but the final settlement dates back to the late Middle Ages; the oldest ones, which date back to the pre-Roman age, are at Nößlach and Vinader. The road was traveled by traders, travelers and pilgrims, and along the route some hamlets were built. Various historical figures have passed through Gries am Brenner, among them Charlemagne, Albrecht Dürer, Goethe and Mozart. To protect the road in the territory of Gries, a fortress was built, though in 1241 a conflict arose between Albert III County of Tyrol and the Diocese of Brixen, which led to its demolition. Meinhard, Duke of Carinthia was built in 1287 at Leug, just south of Gries; it is a fortress used for customs duty.

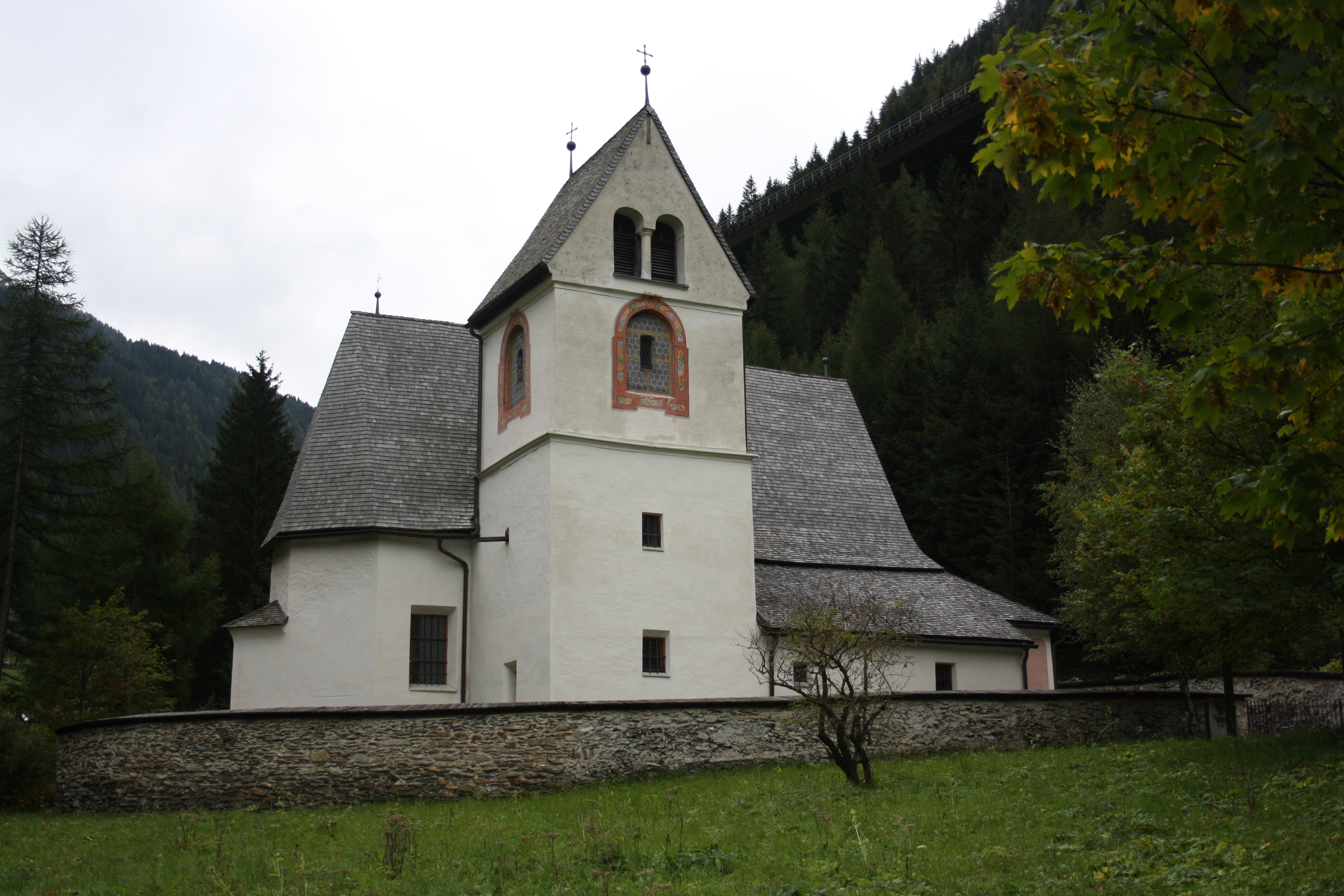
The church "Saints Christopher and Sigismund" at Leug.

Frederick IV, Duke of Austria built nearby a small church that had, between 1461 and 1811, an own vicarate. Maximilian I, Holy Roman Emperor was a regular visitor of Gries since the territory was full of game, during his hunting expeditions stayed at the "Weißes Rößle" Inn. Gries benefited, until 1560, from the wealth created by the mines in nearby Obernbergtal and its territory warehouses and workshops for the manufacture of silver. In 1809 during the Tyrolean Rebellion the General Lefebvre, in retaliation for the defeat suffered by the Saxons troops near Mules, destroyed the station customs at Leug which was definitively closed in 1815. After the second world war, for some years, the coal mine was exploited to the Nößlachjoch. Following the completion of the Brenner motorway, and the consequential diversion of traffic, the village has become quieter and sees fewer tourists. Owing to Gries's location near the border, it has several hotels that are centuries old.

=== Coat of arms ===
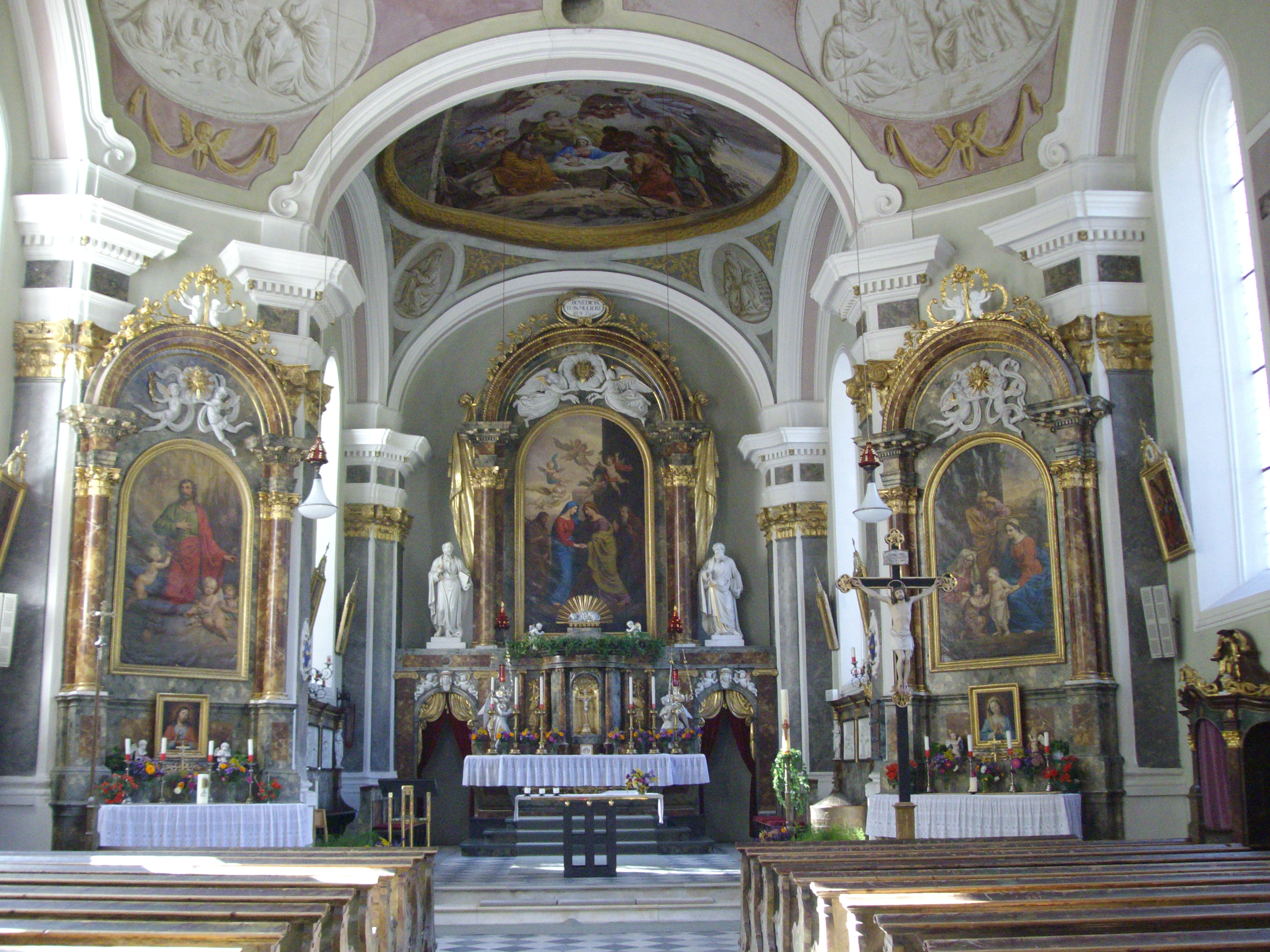
Interior sight of the Parish church "Visitation of Mary"

Gries am Brenner's coat of arms consists of three black forts on yellow background. The forts are referred to those of Leug, Schlossögg and Morhäusl. The emblem was adopted on 9 January 1973.

== Population ==
Historical population
Year	Pop.	±%
1869	875	—
1880	830	−5.1%
1890	753	−9.3%
1900	855	+13.5%
1910	890	+4.1%
1923	980	+10.1%
1934	1,001	+2.1%
1939	1,098	+9.7%
1951	1,257	+14.5%
1961	1,267	+0.8%
1971	1,445	+14.0%
1981	1,321	−8.6%
1991	1,330	+0.7%
2001	1,260	−5.3%
2011	1,255	−0.4%
2015	1,336	+6.5%

== Sights ==
=== Religious architecture ===
==== Church of the "Visitation of Mary" ====
The presence of a church in Gries was documented in 1531 even if it was mentioned before. A church was built in 1634 nearby the "am Gries" Inn, which was enlarged in 1676; only in 1793 had its own curate. In 1823 began the construction of a new church, completed in 1828, in the typical baroque style, that in Tyrol, had been widely used by Franz de Paula Penz.

==== Church of “St. Leonard" ====
The church of “St. Leonard”, situated at Vinader, was probably built before 1000, but it is mentioned only in 1337. The church underwent an enlargement and renovation, in Gothic style, in 1489. Vinader, in 1550, was elevated to Vicariate to which were annexed the villages of the Sill Valley from Stafflach to Brennersee, including Obernbergtal. The church was transformed in 1802 in Baroque style, leaving the portal and the bell tower in the Gothic.

==== Church of "St. Jacob " ====
The church of "St. Jacob", located in the village of Nößlach, is cited for the first time in a letter dated to 1426. In 1494 the church underwent a renovation with the construction of a new altar, still in use, and underwent a major renovation in 1661.

==== Church of the "Saints Christopher and Sigismund" ====
Frederick IV, Duke of Austria, built at Leug, near the customs station, a small Gothic church, with a wide and squat bell tower with a Romanesque appearance. In 1684 the church underwent restoration with the addition of a vestibule and the conversion of the interior to the Baroque style.

== Economy ==
=== Tourism ===
Gries am Brenner is a base for both winter and summer tourism. It is possible to reach the Sattelbergalm, located at 2115 m. Next to the border, and has become known and well equipped ski resort and summer destination for excursions.
