= Pfitschtal =

Coordinates: 46°54′N 11°28′E

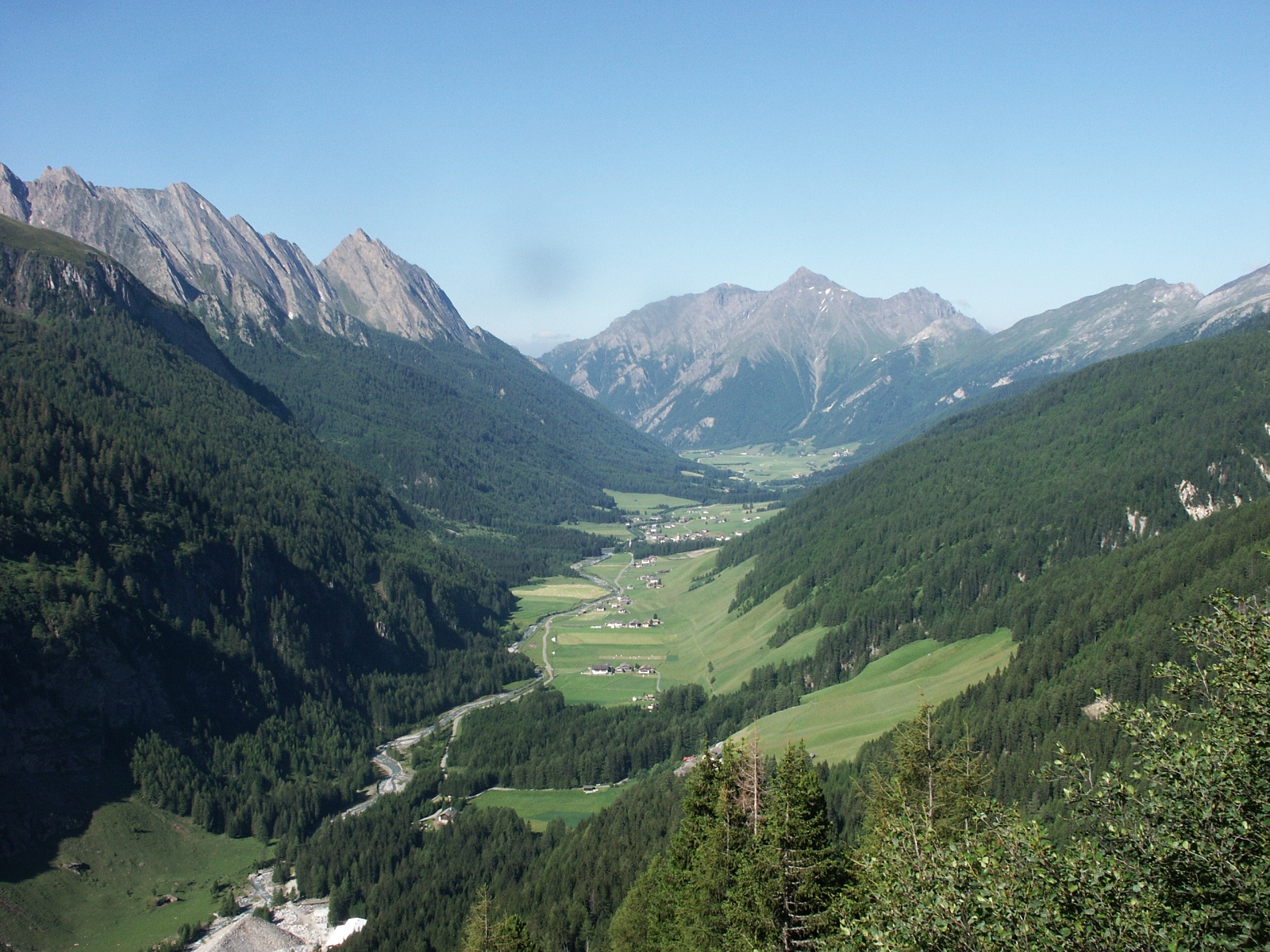
View from the Pfitscher Joch down to the Pfitschtal

The Pfitschtal or Pfitscher Tal (Italian: Val di Vizze; German: Pfitschtal) is a valley in South Tyrol, Italy.

The Italian name Val di Vizze is used both for the valley and for the municipality of Pfitsch.
