= Brennersee =

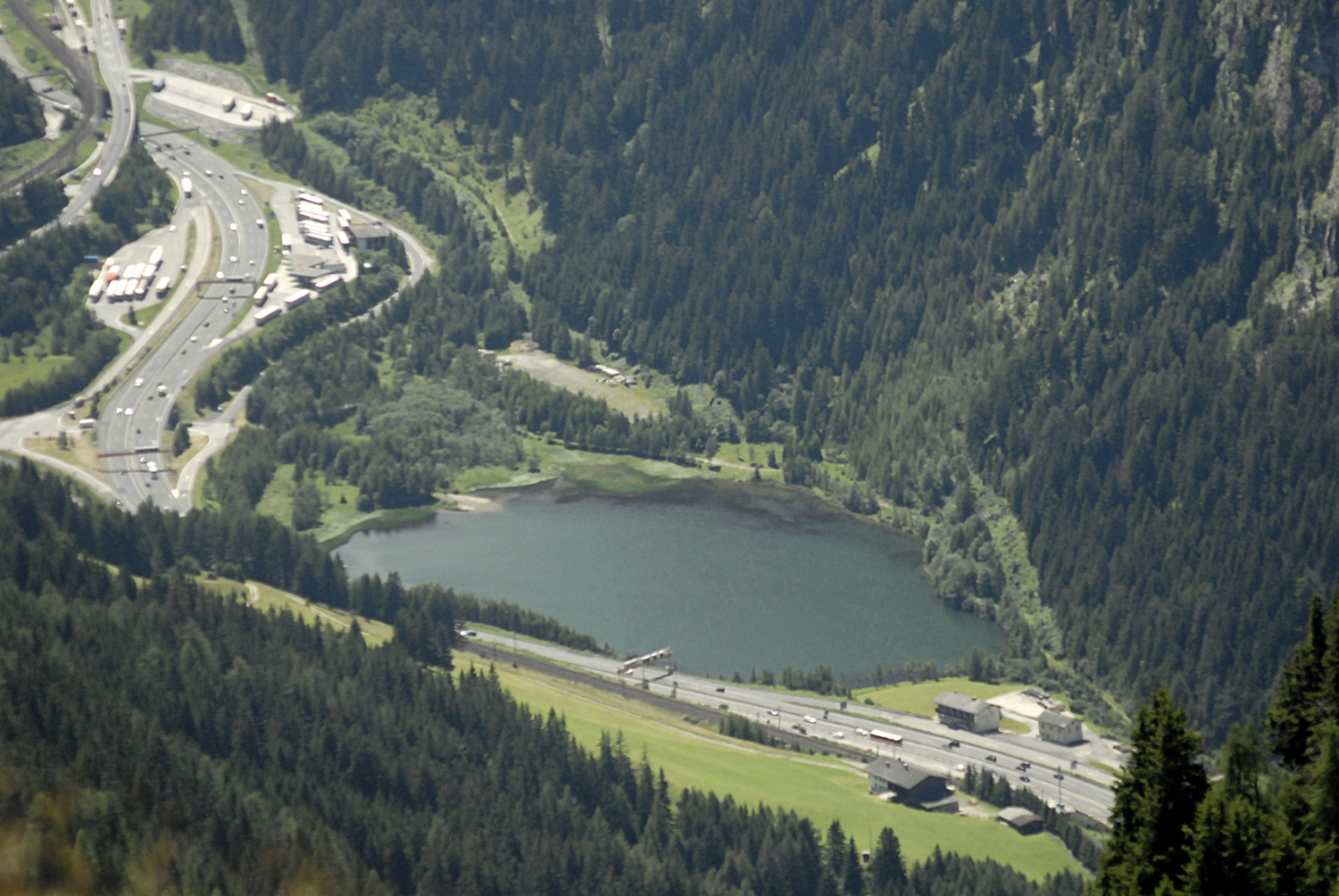

- Location within Tyrol, Austria
- Location: Wipptal, Tyrol
- Coordinates: 47°01′N 11°30′E
- Type: Mountain lake
- Primary inflows: Sill River
- Primary outflows: Sill River
- Basin countries: Austria
- Surface area: 19.25 ha (47.6 acres)
- Surface elevation: 1,310 m (4,300 ft)
- Settlements: Gries am Brenner

The lake Brennersee is a lake in Tyrol, Austria that lies approximately 1.15 km north of the Brenner Pass, 1,310 metres above sea level. With an area of approximately 19 ha, it is the biggest lake in the Wipptal. The lake can be explored by motorway A13 or by local train from Innsbruck.

Although the lake is always open to public for bathing, the water barely warms up to 12 °C, even in midsummer. In addition, the basin and motorway often conceal the sun, and the proximate environment is chilly. The Sill River provides the lake with fresh water and drains it at the same time. The cold water fluctuates between A and B grade quality and accommodates various kinds of carp and trout. An alga curtain on the lake floor gives the water a predominantly jade colour.
