= Rasen-Antholz =

- Comune
- Gemeinde Rasen-Antholz; Comune di Rasun-Anterselva
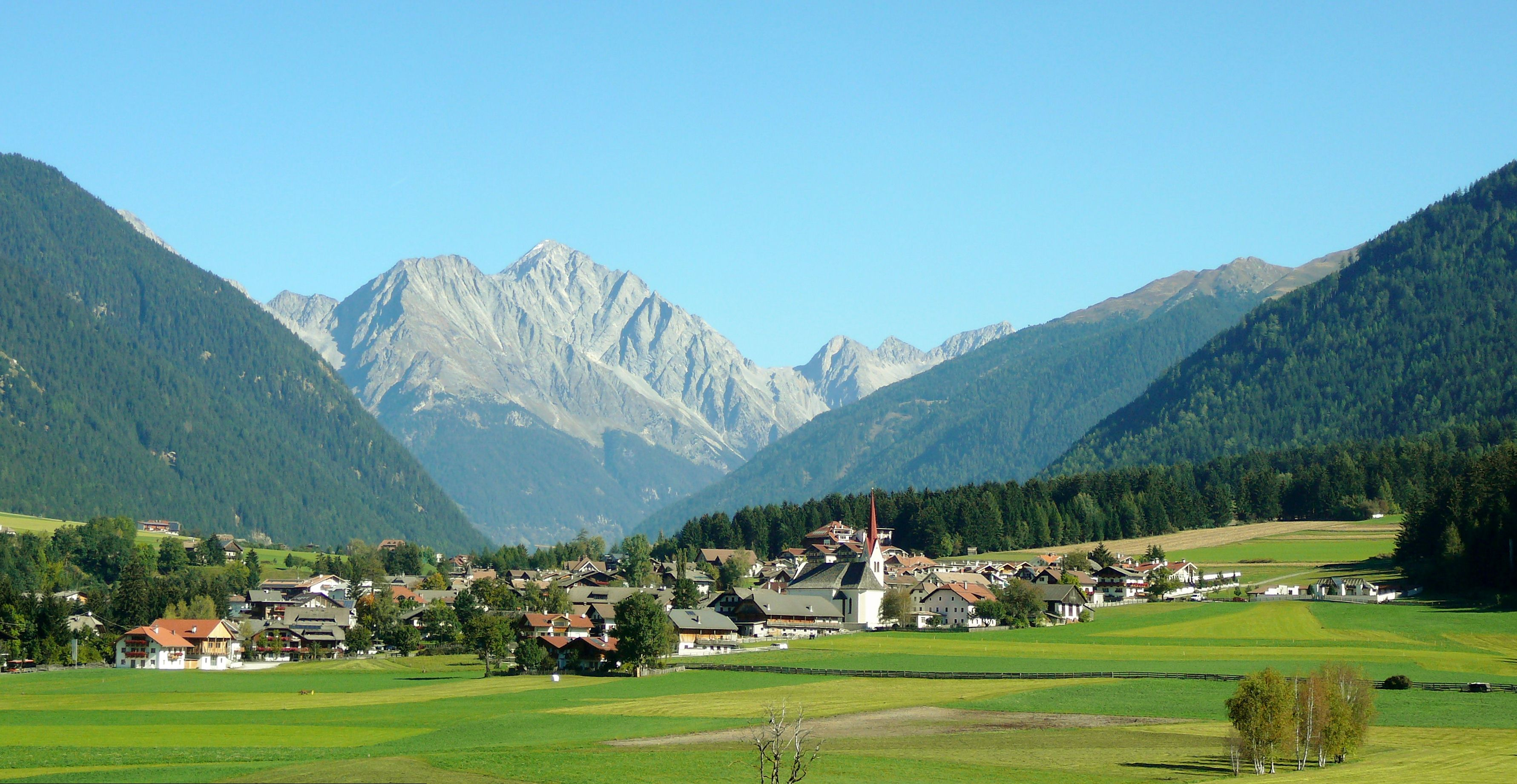
- Niederrasen in October 2011

- Coat of arms

- Location within Italy Location within Trentino-Alto Adige/Südtirol
- Coordinates: 46°47′N 12°3′E
- Country: Italy
- Region: Trentino-Alto Adige/Südtirol
- Province: South Tyrol (BZ)
- Frazioni: Antholz Niedertal (Anterselva di Sotto), Antholz Mittertal (Anterselva di Mezzo), Antholz Obertal (Anterselva di Sopra), Neunhäusern (Nove Case), Niederrasen (Rasun di Sotto), Oberrasen (Rasun di Sopra)

Government
  - Mayor: Thomas Schuster (SVP)

Area
  - Total: 121.1 km^{2} (46.8 sq mi)
- Elevation: 1,030 m (3,380 ft)

Population (31 October 2025)
  - Total: 2,939
  - Density: 24.27/km^{2} (62.86/sq mi)
- Demonym(s): German: Rasner or Antholzer; Italian: di Rasun-Anterselva
- Time zone: UTC+1 (CET)
  - Summer (DST): UTC+2 (CEST)
- Postal code: 39030
- Dialing code: 0474
- Website: Official website

Rasen-Antholz (German pronunciation: [ˈraːsn̩-ˈanthɔlts]; Italian: Rasun-Anterselva [raˈzun ˌanterˈselva]) is a municipality in South Tyrol in northern Italy.

== Geography ==
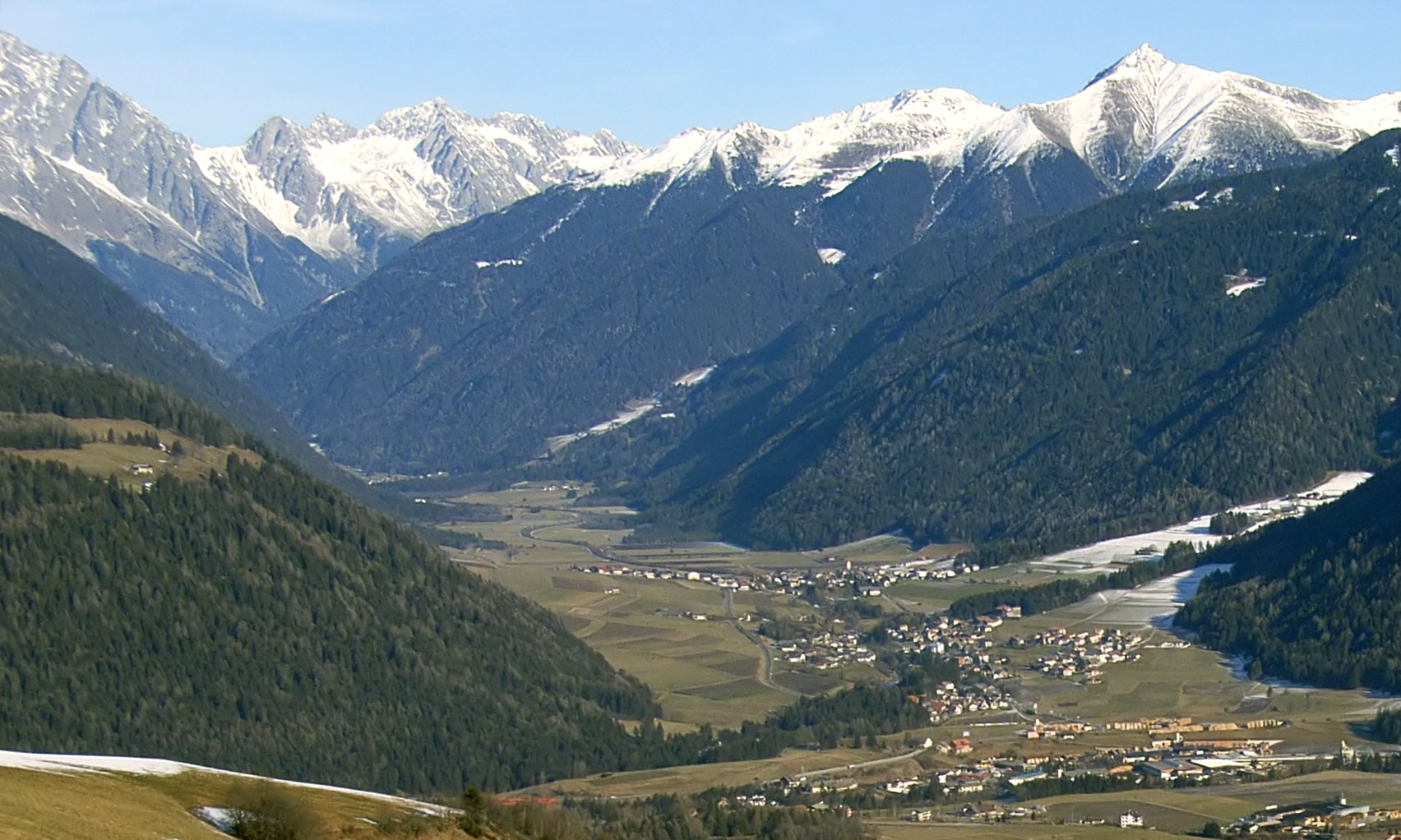
Antholz valley

The municipal area stretches along the Antholz valley, a northern side valley of the larger Puster Valley. In the northeast, the Staller Saddle mountain pass, at a height of 2,050 m (6,730 ft) leads into the Defereggen Valley in East Tyrol, Austria. The Antholz valley is confined by the mountains of the Rieserferner Group in the north and the Villgraten Mountains in the east, both part of the High Tauern range in the Central Eastern Alps. Notable peaks include the Hochgall, at 3,436 m (11,273 ft), and the Wildgall (Collaspro), at 3,273 m (10,738 ft), as well as the Ohrenspitzen massif, at 3,101 m (10,174 ft), in the northeast. Large parts of the northern and western mountain ranges belong to the Rieserferner-Ahrn Nature Park established in 1988. The Antholzer Bach stream runs through the valley from Antholzer See (Lago di Anterselva) down to its confluence with the Rienz (Rienza) river at Olang.

Rasen-Antholz is located east of Bruneck, the administrative centre of the Puster Valley, and about 60 km (37 mi) northeast of the South Tyrolean capital Bolzano. It borders the following municipalities: Bruneck, Gsies, Percha, Olang, Sand in Taufers, Welsberg-Taisten and Sankt Jakob in Defereggen in Austria.

=== Frazioni ===
The municipality of Rasen-Antholz contains six frazioni (subdivisions, mainly villages and hamlets): Antholz Niedertal (Anterselva di Sotto), Antholz Mittertal (Anterselva di Mezzo), Antholz Obertal (Anterselva di Sopra), Neunhäusern (Nove Case), Niederrasen (Rasun di Sotto) and Oberrasen (Rasun di Sopra).

== Linguistic distribution ==
According to the 2024 census, 98.05% of the population speak German, 1.36% Italian and 0.59% Ladin as first language.

== History ==
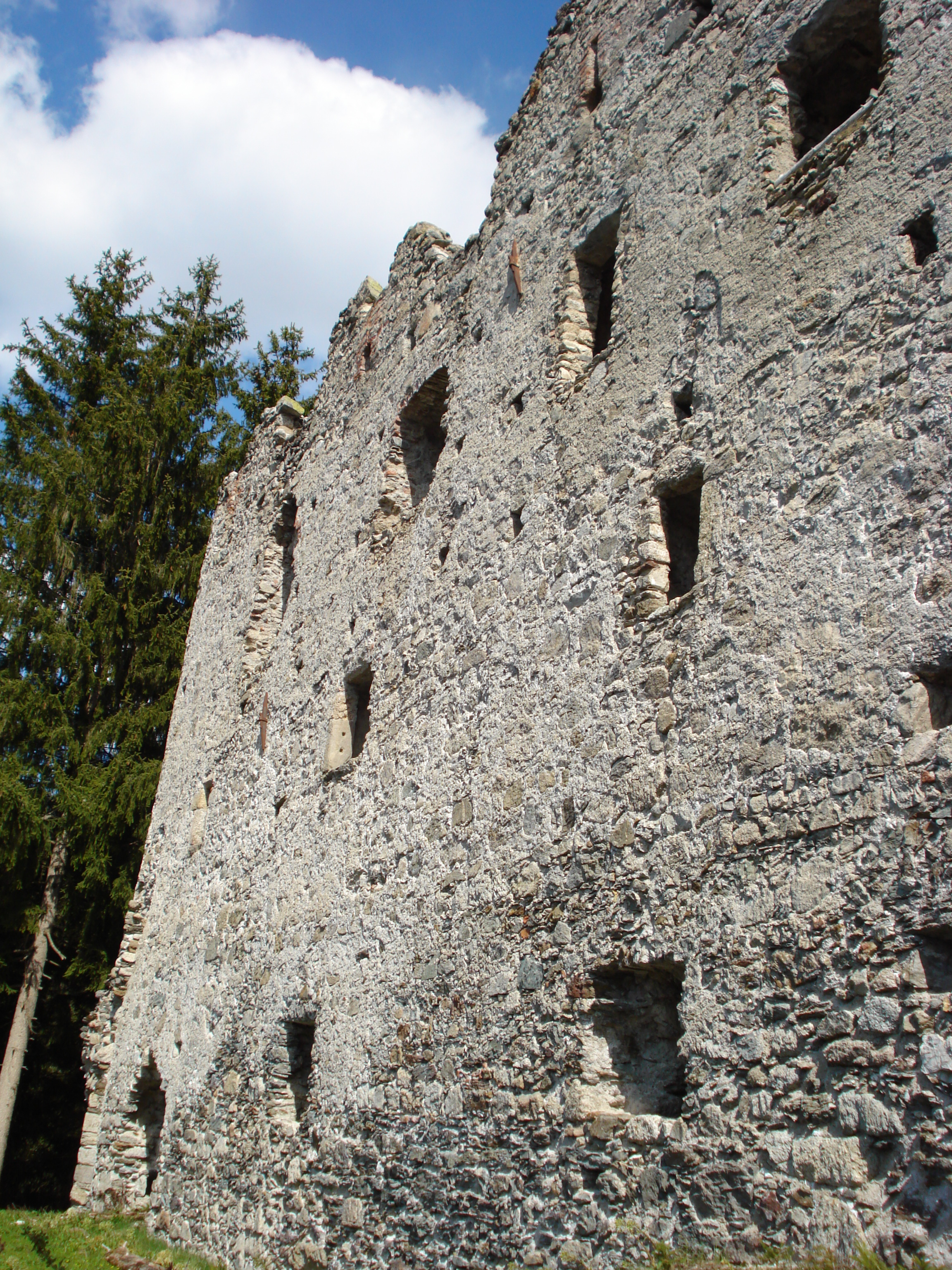
Ruins of Altrasen Castle

Archaeological findings of a Hallstatt cemetery near Niederrasen denote a settlement of the area already in the Iron Age. In 15 BC, present-day Tyrol was conquered by the Roman Empire. About 590 AD, Bavarian tribes under their Duke Tassilo I entered the region.

Rasen itself was first mentioned in a 1050 deed, the local Lords of Rasen served as ministeriales of the Counts of Tyrol from the 13th century onwards. They resided at Altrasen Castle which was first documented in 1210. Count Meinhard II of Tyrol ceded it to his consort Elisabeth of Bavaria in 1259. Meanwhile, the Lords of Rasen had Neurasen Castle erected, which fell to the Bishops of Brixen in 1342.

Upon the extinction of the Meinhardiner counts in 1500, Tyrol as a whole became a crown land of the Habsburg monarchy.

=== Coat-of-arms ===
The shield is gules a pile reversed on sable and argent. It is the sign of the Lords of Rasen, who ruled from 1353. The emblem was officially adopted on 10 August 1967.

== Sports ==
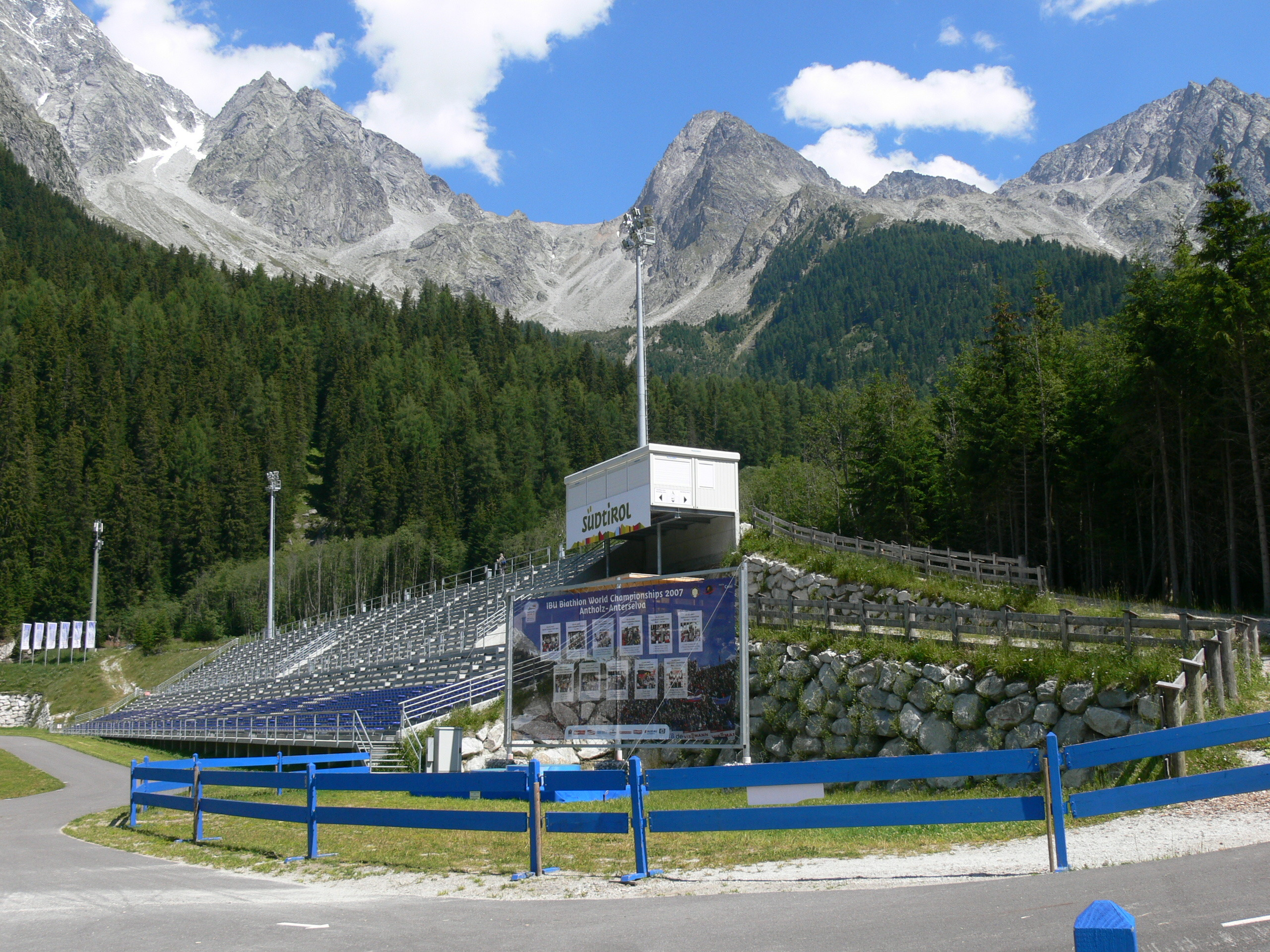
Biathlon track

Rasen-Antholz is known for the South Tyrol Arena biathlon track, which opened in 1971. It hosted the Biathlon World Championships in 1975, 1976, 1983, 1995, 2007 and 2020. It is also a regular venue of the Biathlon World Cup season, with the highest altitude of all World Cup meetings at a height of about 1,600 m (5,200 ft). It will host biathlon for the 2026 Winter Olympics in Milan and Cortina d'Ampezzo.

Antholz also hosted the finish of stage 17 of the 2019 Giro d'Italia, which was won by Nans Peters.

The town also has a local football team, SpG Rasen/Antholz. They play at the Rieserferner-Stadion.

Antholz will be one of the Venues for the 2026 Winter Olympics.

== Notable people ==
- Hubert Leitgeb (1965–2012), biathlete
- Wilfried Pallhuber (born 1967), biathlete
- Johann Passler (born 1961), biathlete
- Gottlieb Taschler (born 1962), biathlete
- Dorothea Wierer (born 1990), biathlete
- Dominik Windisch (born 1989), biathlete
- Andreas Zingerle (born 1961), biathlete
- Enrico Mattei he had a vacation house in Antholz
