= Durreck Group =

Mountain range in Italy

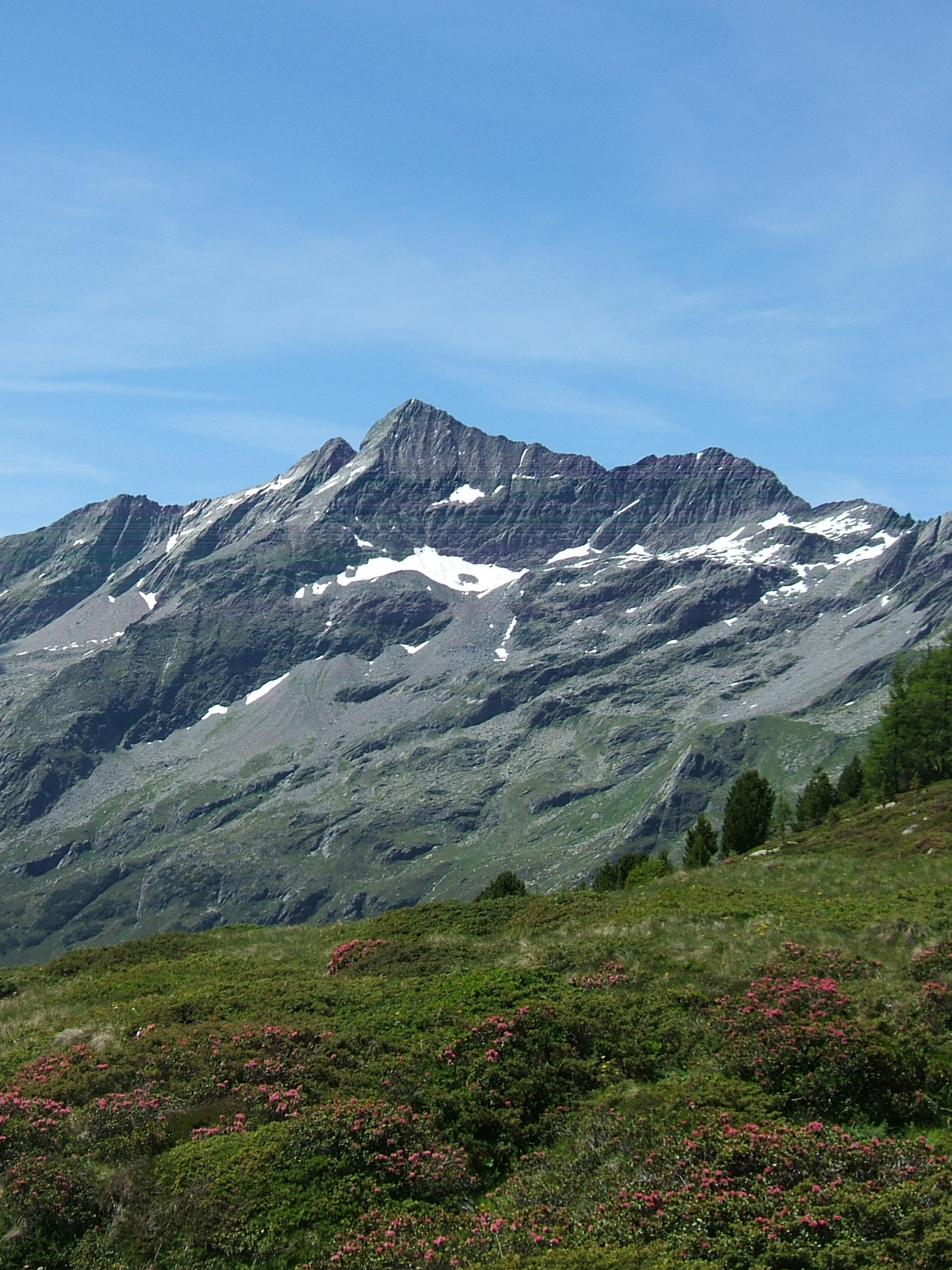
- The Durreck, highest summit in the group

Highest point
- Peak: Durreck
- Elevation: 3,135 m (10,285 ft)

Dimensions
- Length: 14 km (8.7 mi)

Geography
- State(s): South Tyrol, Italy
- Range coordinates: 46°58′00″N 12°02′00″E
- Parent range: Venediger Group

The Durreck Group (Italian: Gruppo della Cima Dura) is an independent mountain range within the Venediger Group, in South Tyrol, Italy. To the north and west it is bounded by the Tauferer Ahrntal, behind which the peaks of the Zillertal Alps stand. To the south it is separated by the valley of Reintal from the Rieserferner Group. The Ochsenlenke (2,623 m) forms the eastern end of the Durreck Group where the rocky ridge drops to almost 2,600 m and completely disappears under the rolling depositional landscape. From the Schneespitze (2,925 m) the first peaks and glaciers of the rest of the Venediger Group appear and link to the main chain of the High Tauern, whose orographically western foothills are therefore the Durreck Group. The Alpine Club classification of the Eastern Alps also counts the range as part of the Venediger Group.

The Durreck Group lies entirely within the Rieserferner-Ahrn Nature Park.

== Peaks ==
The highest peak, and the one that gives its name to the group, is the Durreck (Ital. Cima Dura) with a height of 3,135 m s.l.m. Other summits above 3,000 metres are:

- Großer Moosstock, also Großer Moostock, Großer Moosnock (Ital. Picco Palù): 3,059 m s.l.m.
- Hirbernock (Ital. Cima di Moia): 3,010 m s.l.m., according to other sources only 2,991 m s.l.m.
