= Rauchkofel =

Rauchkofel, sometimes also Rauhkofel, may refer to several mountains in the Alps:

Austria

- Rauchkofel (Zillertal Alps) (3,251 m), also called the Rauhkofel, in the Zillertal Alps
- Rauchkofel (Rieserferner Group) (3,043 m), in the Rieserferner Group
- Rauchkofel (Carnic Alps) (2,460 m), in the Carnic Alps
- Rauchkofel (Abfaltersbach) (1,959 m), near Abfaltersbach
- Rauchkofel (Lienz) (1,910 m), also called the Rauhkofel, in East Tyrol

Italy

- Rauchkofel (Durreck Group) (2,653 m), in the Durreck range in the Venediger Group
