= Durreck =

Mountain in South Tyrol, Italy

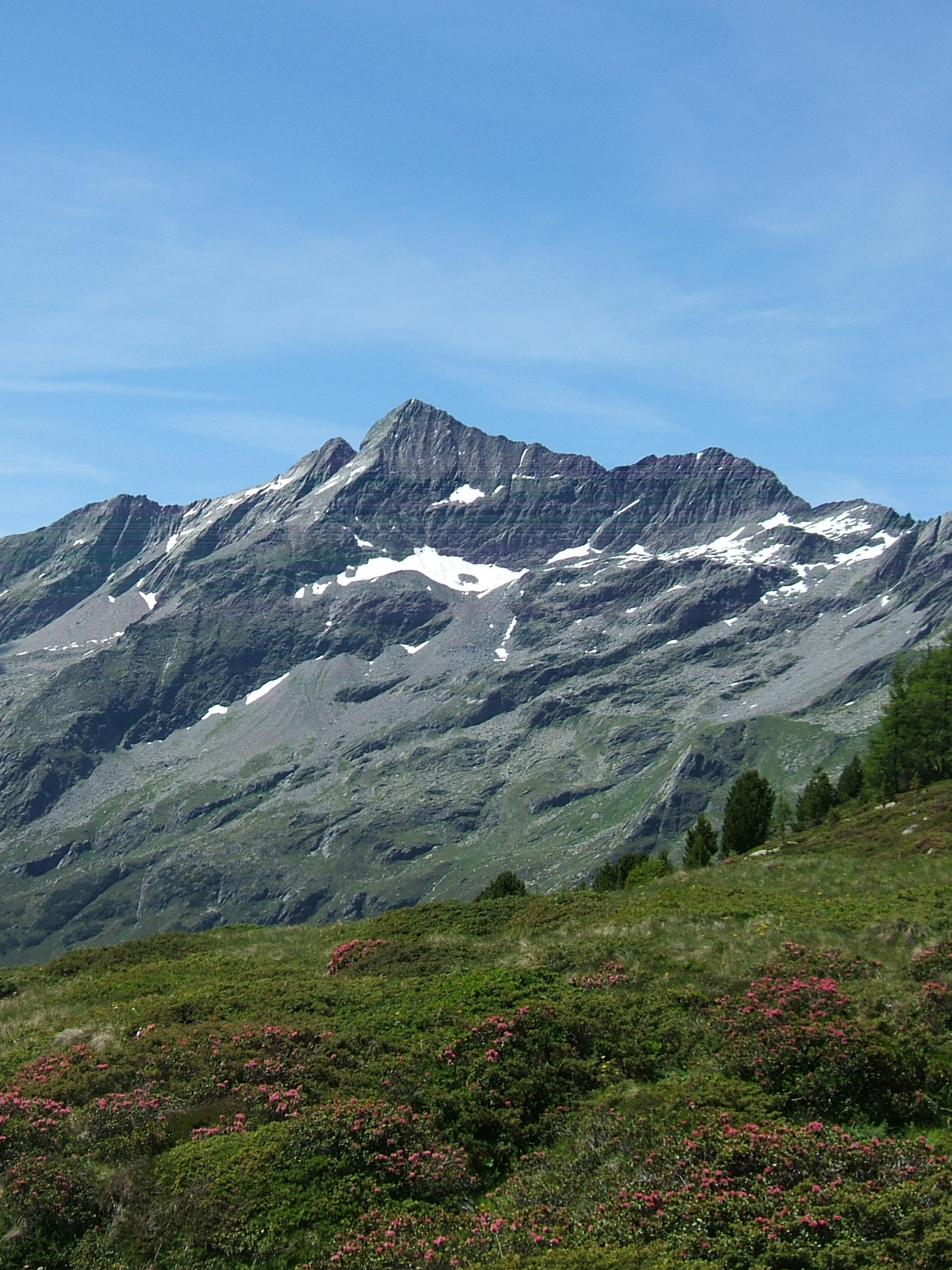
- The Durreck from the Kofler Seen to the east

Highest point
- Elevation: 3,135 m s.l.m. (10,285 ft)
- Prominence: 618 m ↓ Weiße Wand
- Listing: Alpine mountains above 3000 m
- Coordinates: 46°57′36″N 12°01′40″E

Geography
- Location within Italy
- Location: South Tyrol, Italy
- Parent range: Durreck Group

Climbing
- First ascent: July 1877 by C. Arnold of Munich and Josef Außerhofer of Rein
- Normal route: From Rein along the southeast ridge (II)

The Durreck (3,135 m, also called the Durreckspitze, Italian: Cima Dura) is the highest mountain in the Durreck Group, a South Tyrolean range that divides the Ahrntal valley in the north from the Reintal valley in the south.

== Location ==
The Durreck lies on the main chain of the mountains that runs from northeast to southwest. This main crest forks only about 100 metres to the southwest at the nearby subpeak of the Zwieselnöckl (3,088 m). One branch runs southwards to the Großer Moosstock (3,059 m) and the other northwards, via the Klausnock (2,819 m), Rauchkofel (2,653 m) and Pojenspitze (2,453 m) near the Obersteiner Holm (2,395 m) above Luttach. Northeast of the Durreck at a distance of half a kilometre is a very prominent, but unnamed subpeak at 3,056 metres. Further along the main chain to the northwest is the Gamskarschneide, several peaks just under the 3000-metre mark and finally the Hirbernock (3,010 m). Northwest of the Durreck are the last remnants of glaciation in the Durreck Group, the Klausenkees glacier, that still descended as low as 2,300 metres in 1910. The whole area is part of the Rieserferner-Ahrn Nature Park.

== First ascents ==
The Durreck was first climbed in July 1877 by C. Arnold from Munich and Josef Außerhofer from Rein. They approached from the south, from Moosmaier Alm. In summer 1883 the Durreck was first crossed by V. H. Schnorr from Zwickau with a guide, Stabeler, from Taufers. They started from the Ahrntal to the north and descended into the Reintal valley. On 20 August 1909 another route up the Durreck was ascended for the first time by O. Primus and F. Schaufler from Innsbruck and H. Schwarweber from Pforzheim, following the northern ridge above the Klausenkees to the top.

== Literature and maps ==
- Hermann Schwarzweber: Die Durreckgruppe. Ein Beitrag zu ihrer Erschließung. In: Zeitschrift des deutschen und österreichischen Alpenvereins. 41: 202–240, Munich, 1910 (online at ALO)
- Richard Goedeke: 3000er in den Nordalpen. Bruckmann, Munich, 2004, ISBN 3-7654-3930-4
- Topographic walking map, Ahrntal / Rieserferner Gruppe, Sheet 035, 1:25,000, Casa Editrice Tabacco, ISBN 88-8315-035-X
