= Schneebiger Nock =

Mountain in Italy

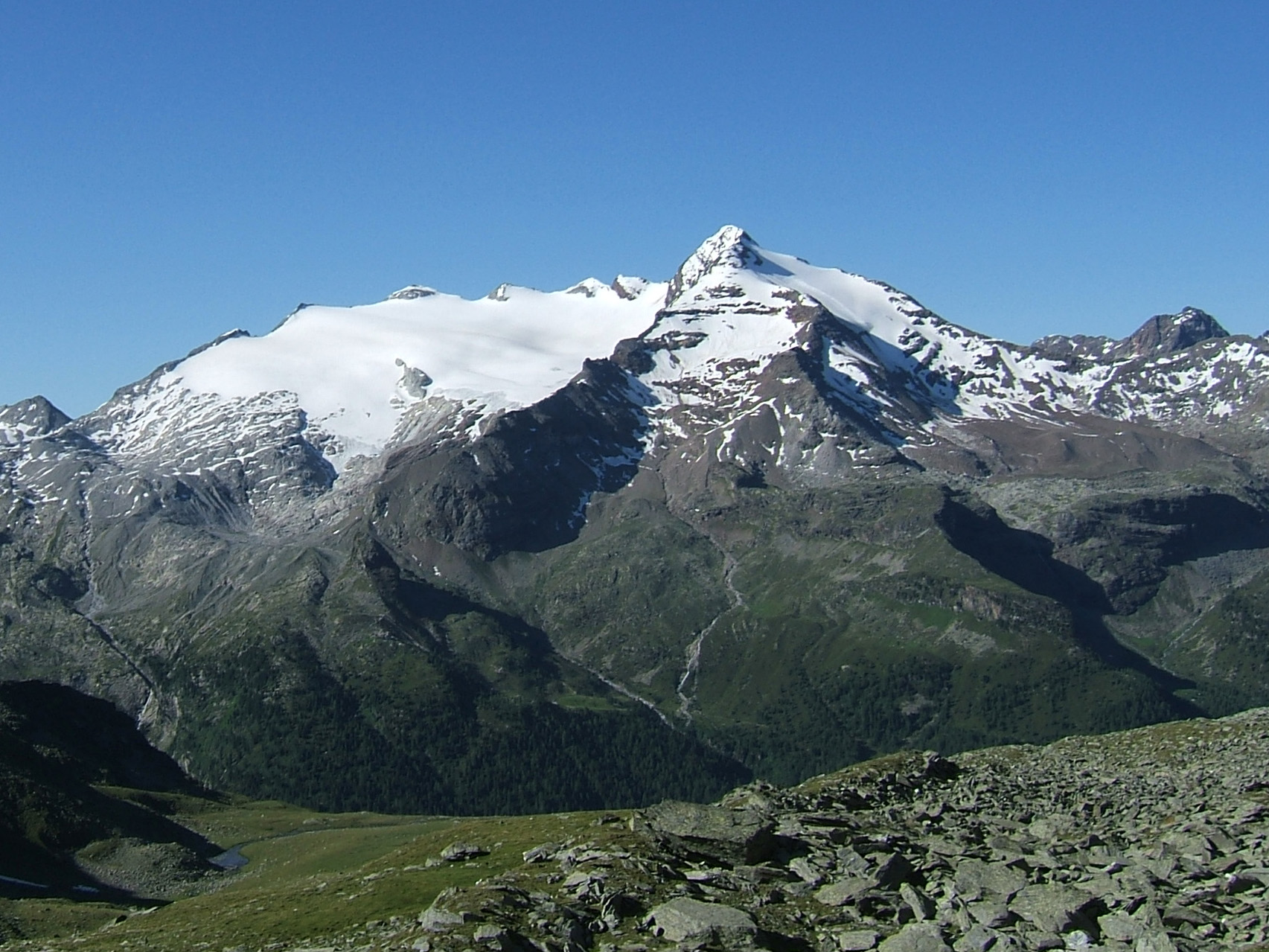
- The Schneebiger Nock from the north.

Highest point
- Elevation: 3,358 m s.l.m. (11,017 ft)
- Listing: Alpine mountains above 3000 m
- Coordinates: 46°54′20″N 12°05′04″E

Geography
- Location within Italy
- Location: South Tyrol, Italy
- Parent range: Rieserferner Group

Climbing
- First ascent: 6 October 1866 by Archduke Rainer of Austria, Count Heinrich Wurmbrand, and mountain guides, Georg Auer, Johann Oberarzbacher from Rein and Georg Weiss, innkeeper
- Easiest route: from the Kasseler Hut via the north arete

The Schneebiger Nock (Italian: Monte Nevoso), in old literature also called the Ruthnerhorn, is 3,358 metres high and, after the Hochgall, the second highest mountain of the Rieserferner Group, a range in the western part of the High Tauern. The mountain rises in the Italian province of South Tyrol in the Rieserferner-Ahrn Nature Park (Parco Naturale Vedrette di Ries-Aurina). It was first climbed on 6 October 1866 by Archduke Rainer Ferdinand of Austria, Count Heinrich Wurmbrand, and mountain guides, Georg Auer, Johann Oberarzbacher from Rein in Taufers and Georg Weiss, an innkeeper from St. Johann im Reintal. Today the Schneebige Nock may be reached from the Kasseler Hut (also Hochgall Hut) to the northeast or from the Rieserferner Hut to the south. Thanks to its prominent pyramidal shape and its distinct arêtes it is a frequently visited viewing summit.

== Literature and maps ==
- Helmut Dumler: Gebietsführer Südtirol 3, Bergverlag Rudolf Rother, Munich, 1987, ISBN 3-7633-3300-2
- Johann Daimer und Reinhold Seyerlen in einem Beitrag der Zeitschrift des Deutschen und Oesterreichischen Alpenvereins, Band XI, Munich, 1880
- Jahrbuch des Oesterreichischen Alpenvereins, Band III, 1867, Vienna, 1867
- Carl Diener in Eduard Richter (ed.): Die Erschließung der Ostalpen, III. Band, Berlin, 1894
- Raimund von Klebelsberg: Geologie von Tirol, Gebr. Borntraeger, Berlin, 1935
- Casa Editrice Tabacco, Tavagnacco, walking map 1:25,000 series, Sheet 035, Valle Aurina/Ahrntal, Vedrette di Ries/Rieserferner-Gruppe
