= Barmer =

Barmer may refer to:

- Barmer district, a district of Rajasthan state, India
  - Barmer (Lok Sabha constituency), a Lok Sabha parliamentary constituency of Rajasthan
  - Barmer, Rajasthan, a city in Barmer district
  - Barmer Taluka
  - Barmer (Rajasthan Assembly constituency), a state assembly constituency of Rajasthan
- Barmer, Norfolk, a village in England
- Barmer Spitze, a mountain on the border between Tyrol, Austria, and South Tyrol, Italy
