= Große Windschar =

Mountain in Italy

- Italian: Cima del Vento Grande
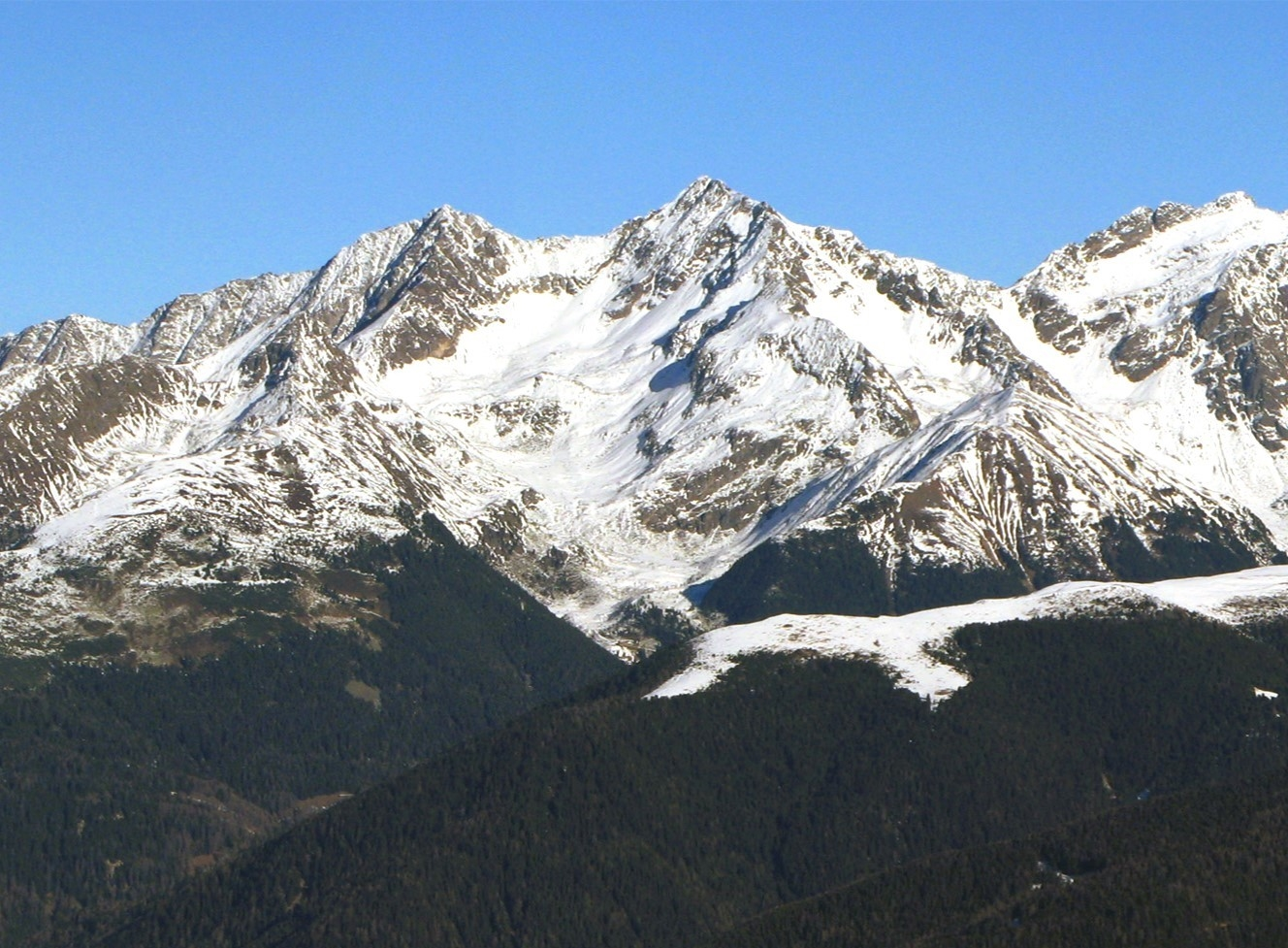
- South aspect

Highest point
- Elevation: 3,041 m (9,977 ft)
- Prominence: 246 m (807 ft)
- Parent peak: Großer Fensterlekofel
- Isolation: 1.93 km (1.20 mi)
- Coordinates: 46°53′23″N 12°01′01″E

Geography
- Location within Italy
- Interactive map of Große Windschar
- Country: Italy
- Province: South Tyrol
- Protected area: Rieserferner-Ahrn Nature Park
- Parent range: Alps; Rieserferner Group
- Topo map: Tabacco 035 Valle Aurina / Ahrntal

Climbing
- First ascent: 1878

Große Windschar, also known as Cima del Vento Grande in Italian, is a mountain in the province of South Tyrol in northern Italy.

== Description ==
Große Windschar is a 3,041-meter-elevation (9,977-foot) summit in the Rieserferner Group of the Alps. Set in the Trentino-Alto Adige/Südtirol region, the peak is located 11 kilometers (6.8 miles) north-northeast of the town of Bruneck and situated in Rieserferner-Ahrn Nature Park. Precipitation runoff from the mountain's slopes drains into tributaries of the Ahr River. Topographic relief is significant as the summit rises 2,200 meters (7,218 feet) above the Ahr Valley in five kilometers (3.1 miles). The nearest higher neighbor is Großer Rauchkofel, 1.93 kilometers (1.2 miles) to the east. The mountain's descriptive toponym translates as "Great Wind Gap" from German, and "Great Wind Peak" from Italian. The first documented ascent was made on August 5, 1878, by Reinhold Seyerlen and guide Stefan Kirchler via the southeast ridge.

== Climate ==
Based on the Köppen climate classification, Große Windschar is located in an alpine climate zone with long, cold winters, and short, mild summers. Weather systems are forced upwards by the mountains (orographic lift), causing moisture to drop in the form of rain and snow. The months of June through September offer the most favorable weather for visiting or climbing in this area.

== Gallery ==
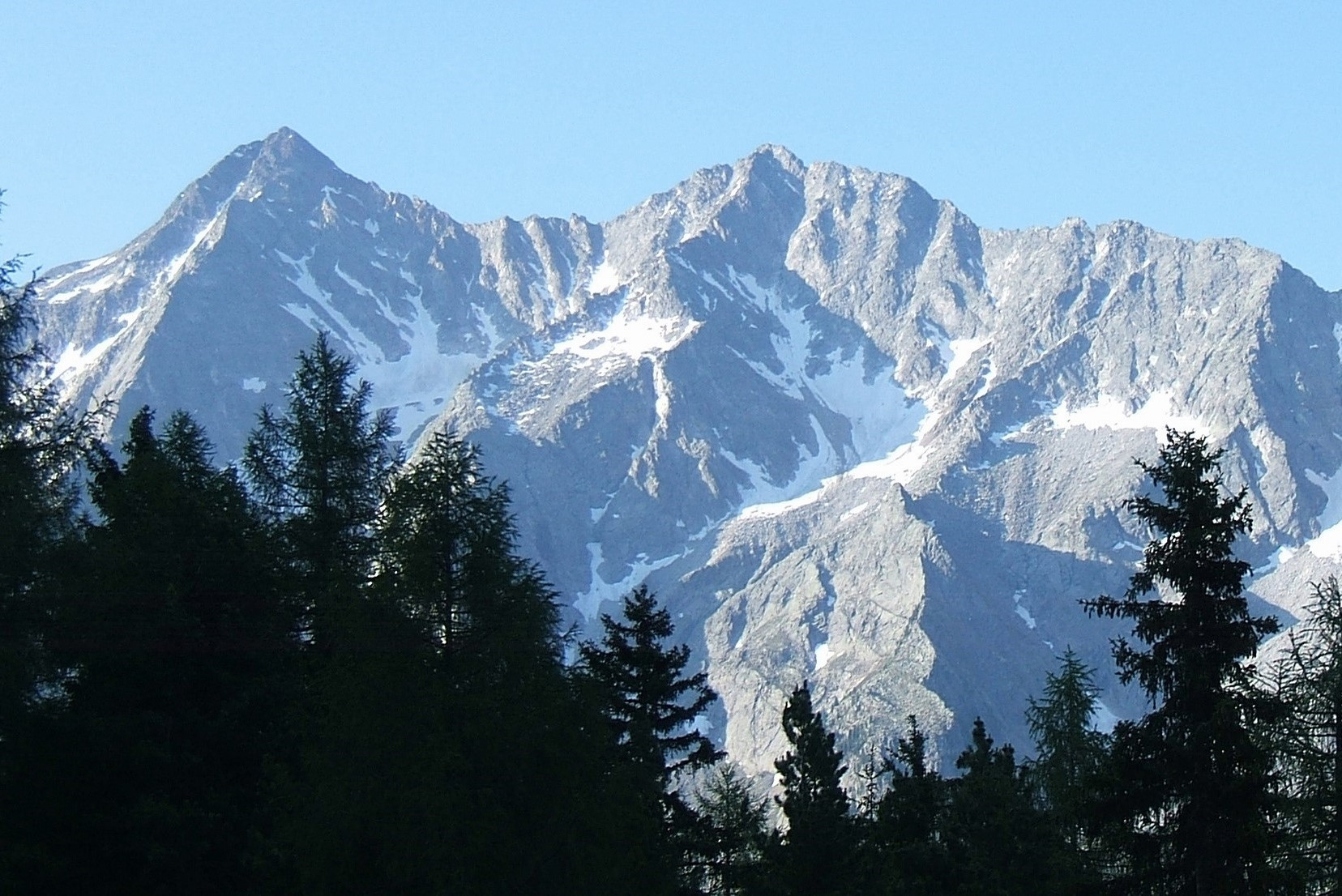
North aspect
