= Ohrenspitzen =

Mountain in Italy

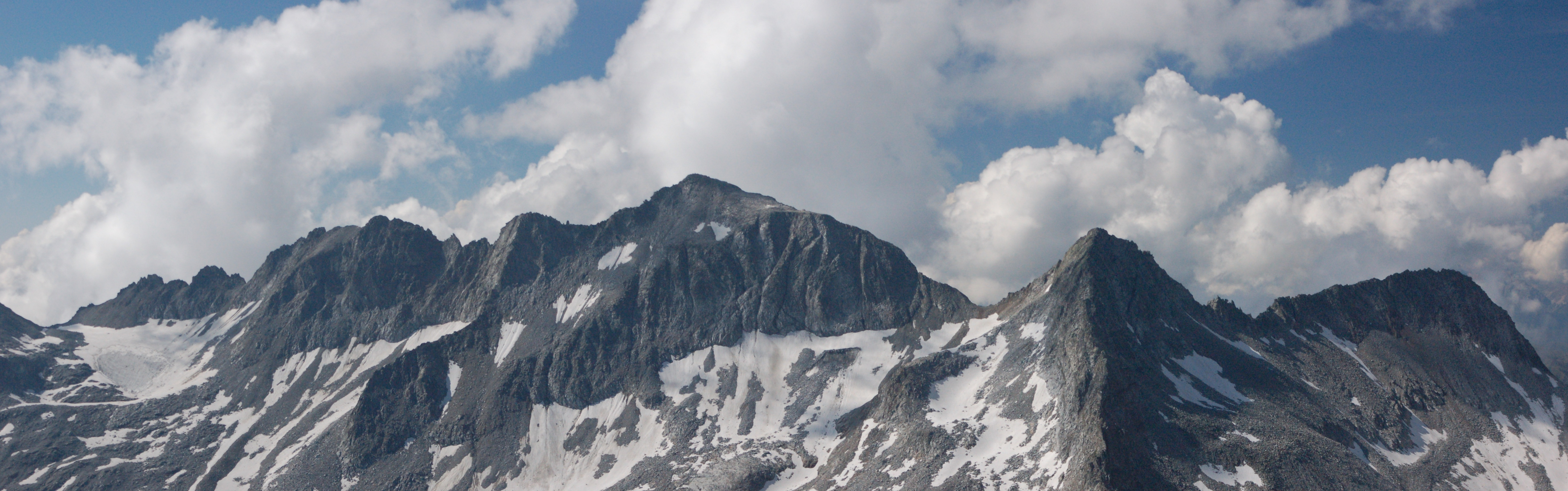

Highest point
- Elevation: 3,101 m (10,174 ft)
- Prominence: 367 m (1,204 ft)
- Listing: Alpine mountains above 3000 m
- Coordinates: 46°54′26″N 12°10′38″E

Geography
- Location: Tyrol, Austria / South Tyrol, Italy
- Parent range: Rieserferner group

The Ohrenspitzen are three peaks on the border between Tyrol, Austria, and South Tyrol, Italy. They are a part of the Rieserferner Group in the Central Eastern Alps.
