= Staller Saddle =

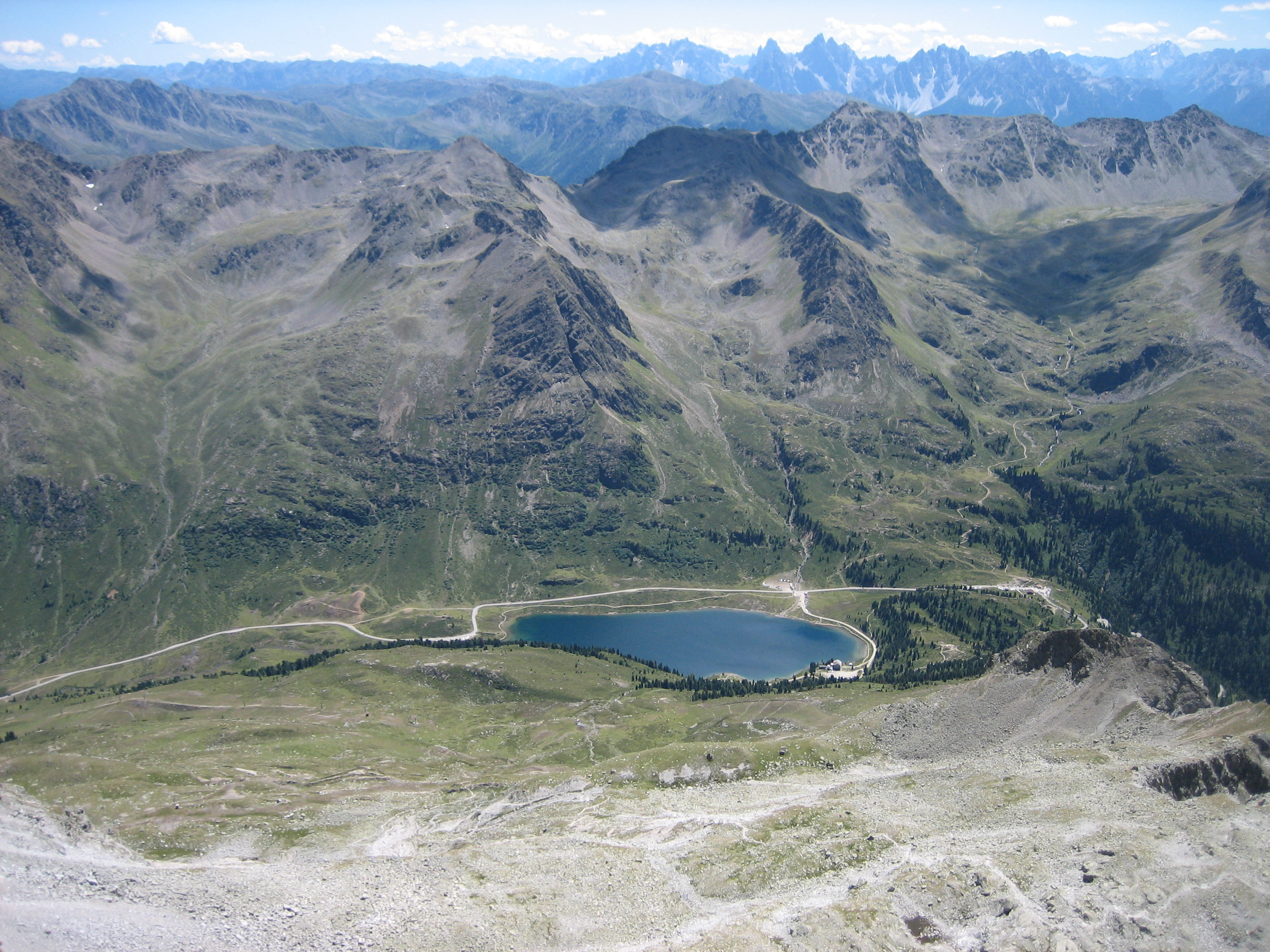
- Staller Saddle (on the right) with Obersee lake and Villgraten Mountains, seen from Mt. Almerhorn

- Location within Alps
- Elevation: 2,052 m (6,732 ft)

Location
- Location: Austria–Italy border
- Range: Central Eastern Alps
- Coordinates: 46°53′17″N 12°12′2″E

Staller Saddle (Bavarian: Schtolla Sottl; German: Staller Sattel; Italian: Passo Stalle), at 2,052 m (6,732 ft), is a high mountain pass in the High Tauern range of the Central Eastern Alps, connecting the Defereggen Valley in East Tyrol with the Antholz Valley in South Tyrol. The pass forms the border between Austria and Italy, it separates the Villgraten Mountains in the southeast from the Rieserferner Group in the northwest.

The pass road is open only from May to October from 5:30 am to 22:15 and prohibited for trailers and caravans. On the Italian side it is very narrow, at points only one way, with traffic lights regulating the contraflow. Traffic from Austria is permitted from the start of each hour to fifteen minutes past (quarter past), and traffic towards Austria from Italy is permitted from the 30th minute (half past) to the 45th minute (quarter to) of the hour.

Starting in 2007, a toll of €5 was planned for cars and motorcycles, the revenue to be split between Italy and Austria, but has not yet been implemented.

== Gallery ==
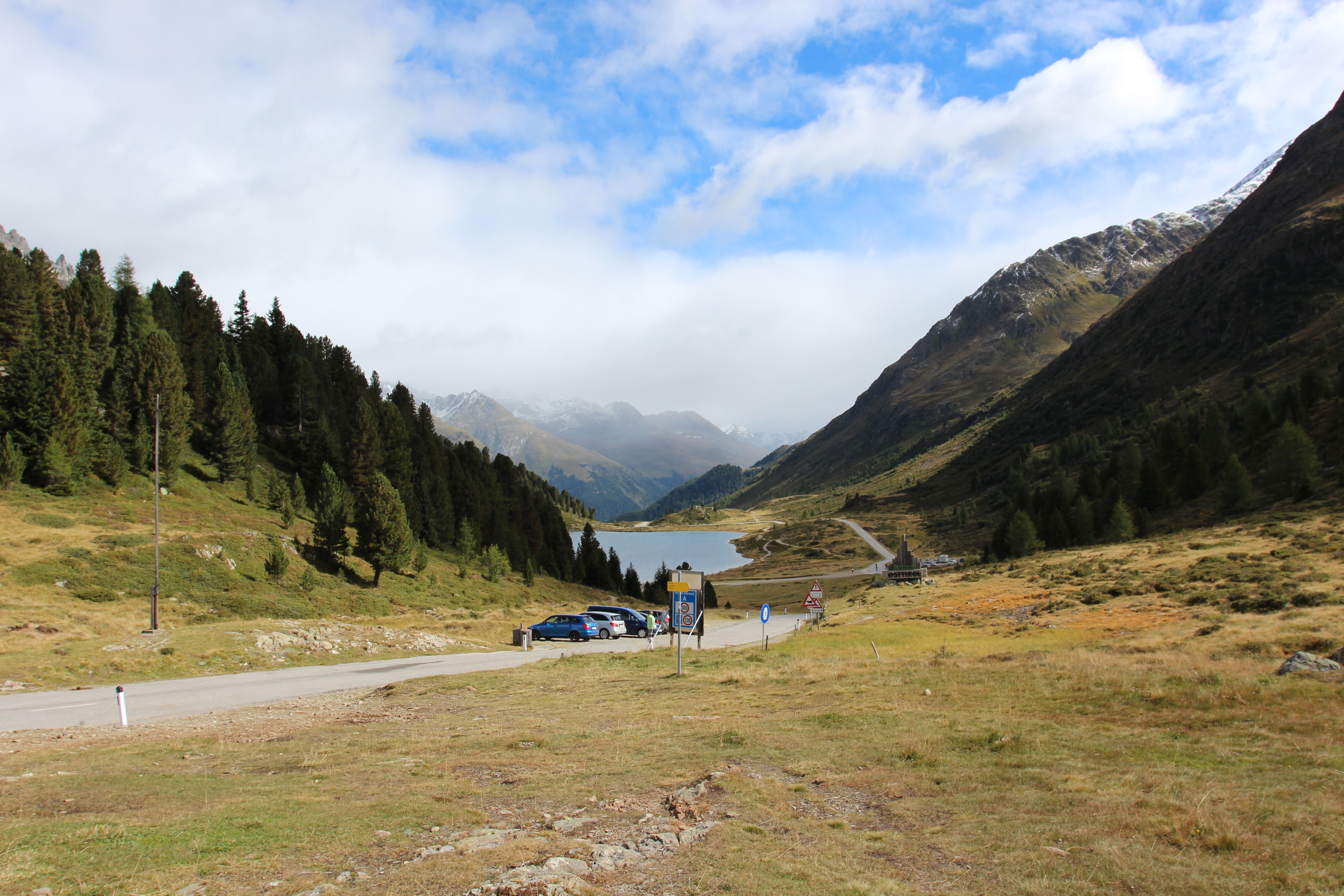
View of the Defereggen Valley and the Obersee (East Tyrol, Austria)

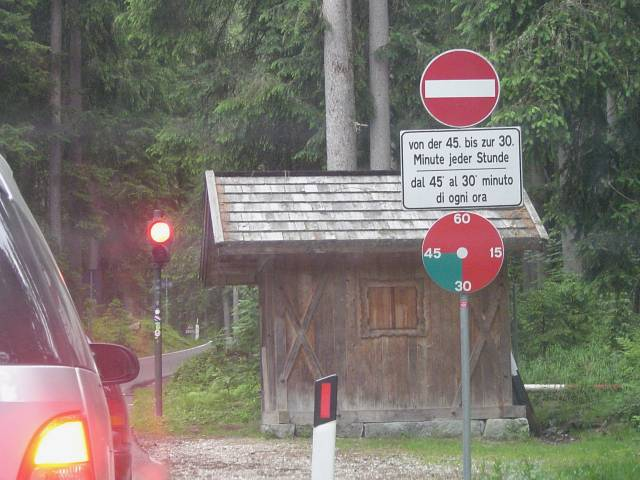
Traffic lights in the Antholz Valley on the Italian side

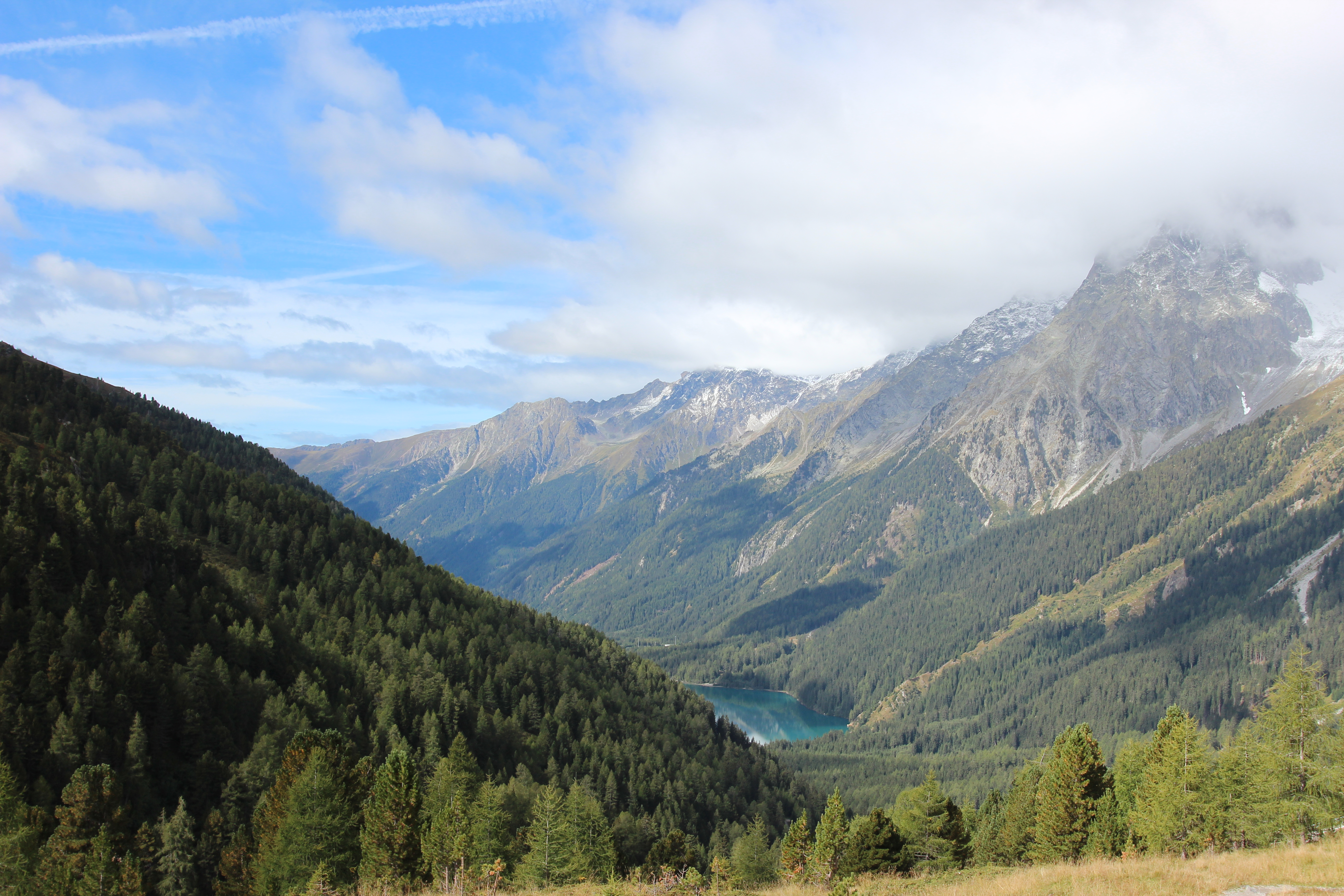
View of the Antholz Valley (Italy) from Staller Saddle. Far right: the Wildgall (3,272 m)

== See also ==
- List of highest paved roads in Europe
- List of mountain passes
