= Fenneregg =

Mountain in Italy

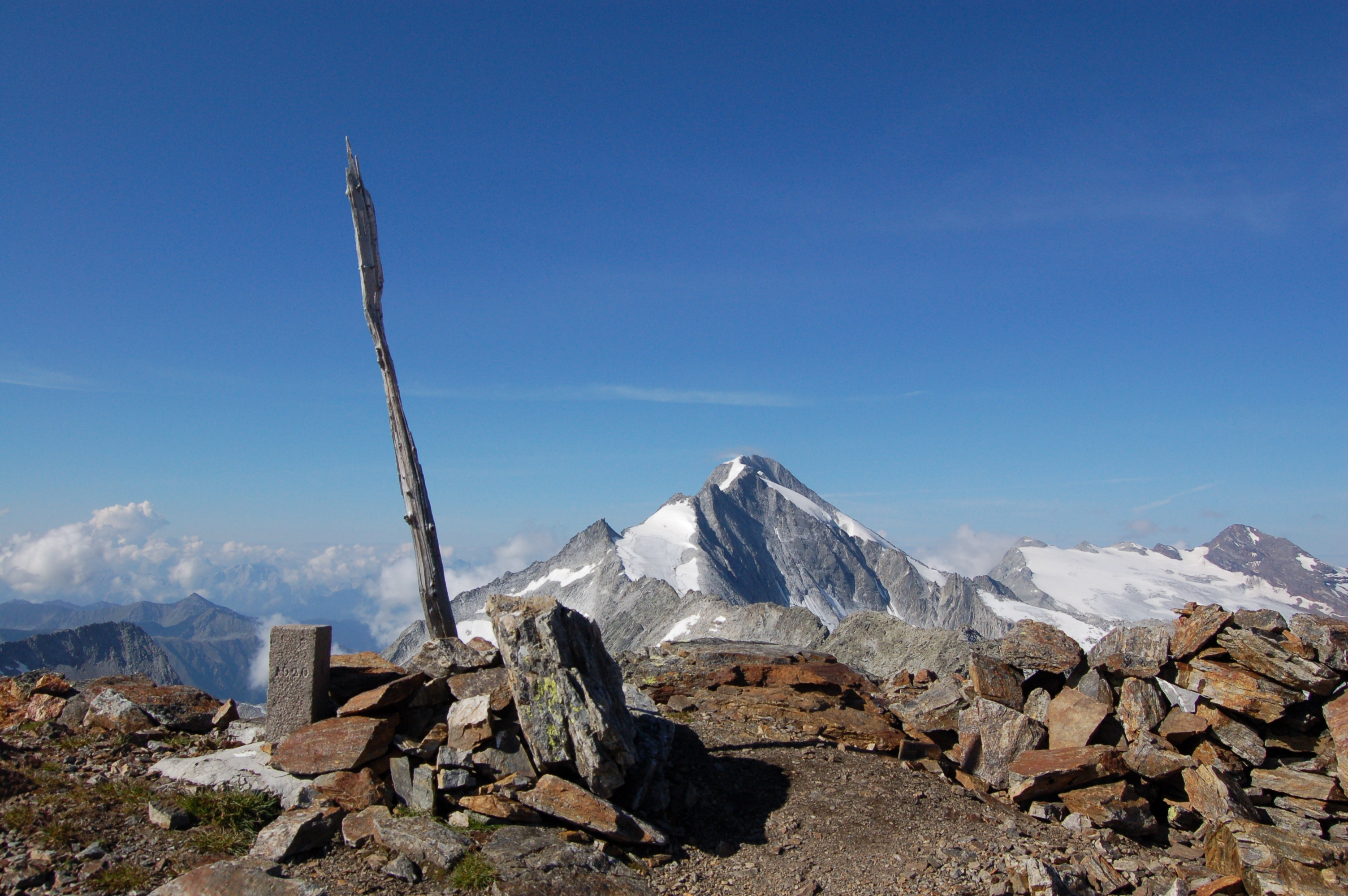

Highest point
- Elevation: 3,123 m (10,246 ft)
- Coordinates: 46°56′2″N 12°10′6″E

Geography
- Location: Tyrol, Austria / South Tyrol, Italy
- Parent range: Rieserferner group

The Fenneregg is a peak of the Rieserferner group on the border between Tyrol, Austria, and South Tyrol, Italy.
