= Rosshorn =

Mountain in Tyrol (Austrian state

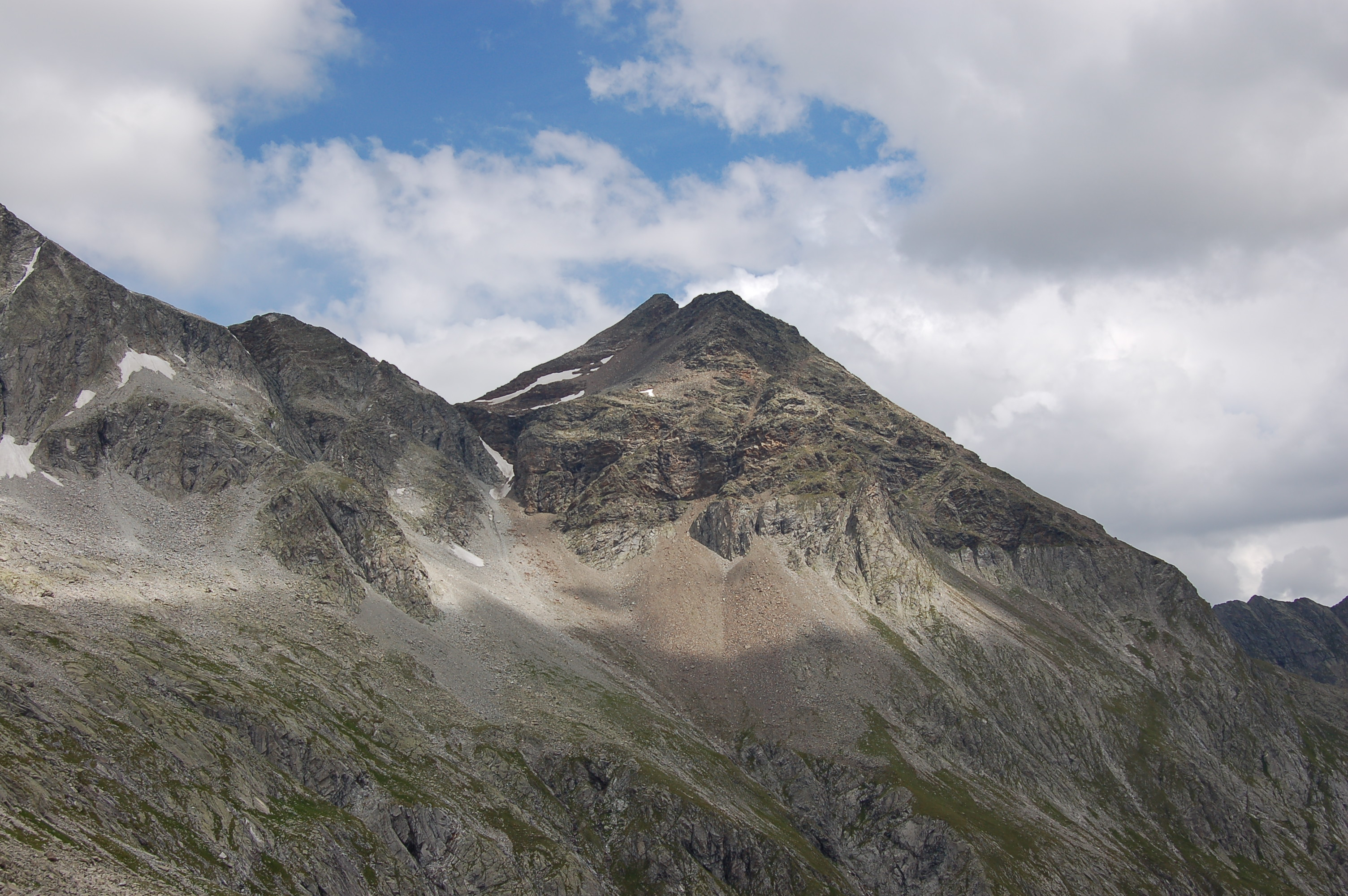

Highest point
- Elevation: 3,068 m (10,066 ft)
- Coordinates: 46.9346°N 12.1794°E

Geography
- Location within Tyrol, Austria
- Location: Tyrol, Austria

The Rosshorn (formerly: Roßhorn) is a mountain of the Rieserferner group in Tyrol, Austria.
