= Lenkstein =

Mountain in Italy

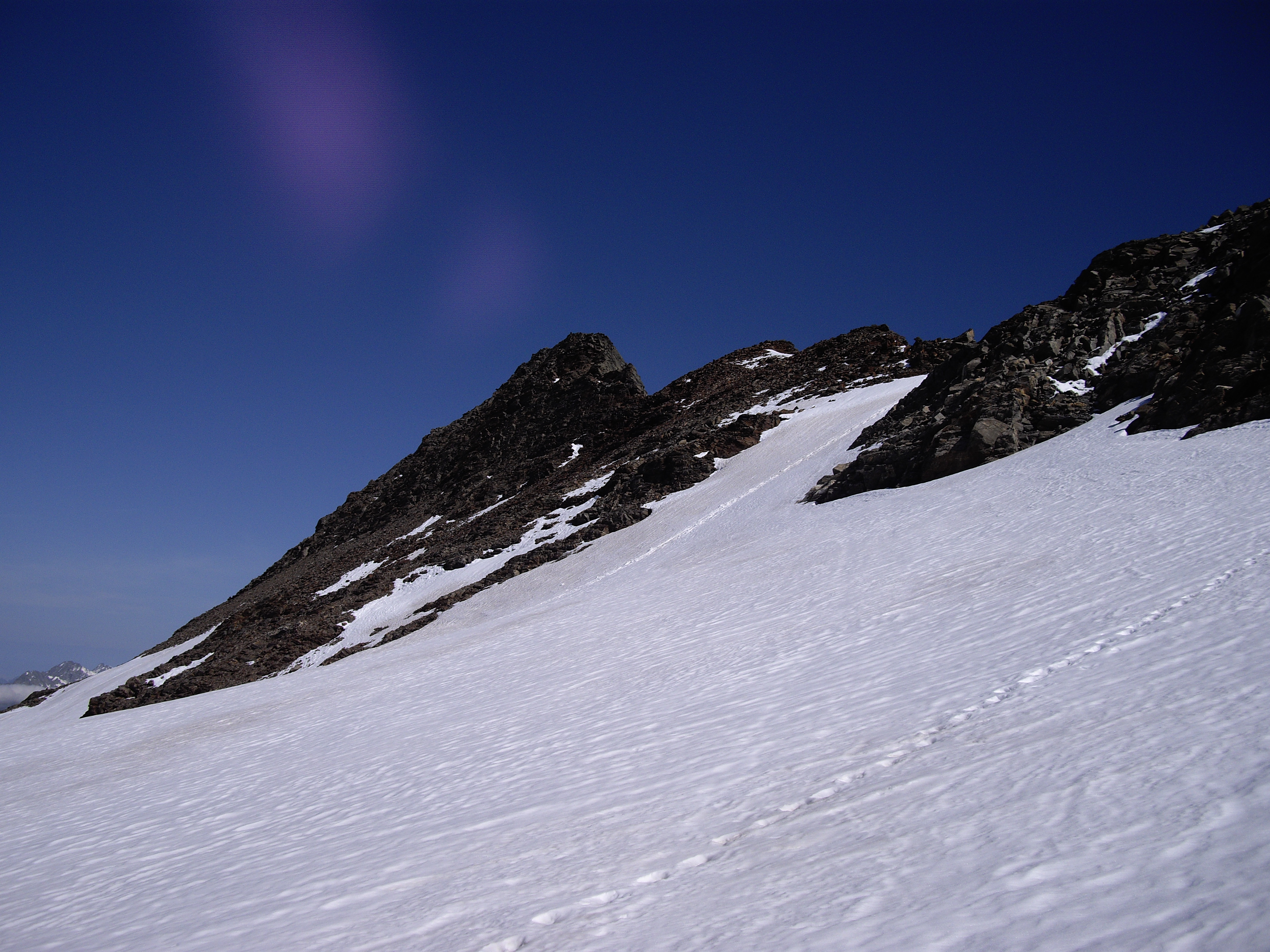
- Lenstein Mountain

Highest point
- Elevation: 3,236 m (10,617 ft)
- Coordinates: 46°56′22″N 12°10′0″E

Geography
- Location: Tyrol, Austria / South Tyrol, Italy
- Parent range: Rieserferner group

The Lenkstein is a mountain in the Rieserferner group on the border between Tyrol, Austria, and South Tyrol, Italy.
