= Venues of the 2026 Winter Olympics and Paralympics =

Facilities of the 2026 Winter Olympics.
Facilities of the 2026 Winter Paralympics.

The 2026 Winter Olympics and 2026 Winter Paralympics, hosted by the cities of Milan and Cortina d'Ampezzo, used 25 event venues across four clusters in northern Italy. These consisted of nineteen existing venues, two newly built venues, and four temporary venues. Over 90% of the venues were either pre-existing or temporary. The Games were the most geographically widespread in Winter Olympic Games history; the use of existing venues meant that the events were held in an area spanning more than 22,000 square kilometres (8,500 sq mi).

== Milan cluster ==
Milan contained four competition venues for four Olympic sports and one Paralympic sport. Construction on a new 16,000-seat ice hockey venue in the Santa Giulia area commenced on 28 November 2023 at an initial estimate of €180 million; however, an additional €70–90 million was reportedly needed due to rising costs of energy and materials. Six buildings that comprised an Olympic and Paralympic Village in Milan were built at the railyard of the Milano Porta Romana railway station; the project's initial cost of €100 million was later revised to €140 million. Temporary arenas were also built at the Fiera Milano Rho complex for ice hockey and speed skating at a cost of €15 million.

- Milano San Siro Olympic Stadium – Olympic opening ceremony
- Milano Santagiulia Ice Hockey Arena – ice hockey, para ice hockey
- Milano Ice Park in Rho – IBC, MBC, ice hockey, speed skating
- Milano Ice Skating Arena – figure skating, short track
- Milano Olympic & Paralympic Village

== Cortina d'Ampezzo cluster ==
Cortina d'Ampezzo contained four competition venues for five Olympic sports and three Paralympic sports. In addition, the venue for biathlon was located in Antholz.

Impresa Pizzarotti started on construction of a new bobsleigh, luge, and skeleton track in Cortina d'Ampezzo at a cost of €81 million. The government of Italy made the decision to rebuild the former track in Cortina d'Ampezzo used during the 1956 Winter Olympics despite opposition from the International Olympic Committee. The project received criticism from environmental groups due to the felling of 20,000 square metres (220,000 sq ft) of larch forest. However, there were also concerns that the venue would not be finished in time for the Games; Mt. Van Hoevenberg Olympic Bobsled Run in Lake Placid, United States, had been selected as the backup venue for the sliding events. Venues in Austria (Olympic Sliding Centre Innsbruck in Igls) and Switzerland (St. Moritz-Celerina Olympic Bobrun in St. Moritz) were previously discussed as back-up sites. The track eventually opened in November 2025 at a construction cost of €118 million.

A temporary Olympic and Paralympic Village on the grounds of the former Cortina Airport in Fiames, located north of Cortina d'Ampezzo, was built to accommodate around 1,400 guests at a cost of around €39 million. In addition, the Olympic Village at Anterselva was established using existing hotels.

- Cortina Curling Olympic Stadium, Cortina d'Ampezzo – curling, wheelchair curling, Paralympic closing ceremony
- Cortina Para Snowboard Park – para snowboard
- Cortina Sliding Centre – bobsleigh, skeleton, luge
- Tofane Alpine Skiing Centre, Cortina d'Ampezzo – alpine skiing, para alpine skiing
- Anterselva Biathlon Arena, Rasen-Antholz – biathlon
- Cortina Olympic & Paralympic Village
- Anterselva Olympic Village

== Valtellina cluster ==
Bormio contained one competition venue for two Olympic sports, while Livigno contained two competition venues for two Olympic sports. In both towns, existing hotels acted as the Olympic Villages, with four in the former and three in the latter. On 11 December 2024, Livigno Aerials & Moguls Park was inaugurated as the first venue to be ready for the 2026 Games.

- Stelvio Ski Centre, Bormio – alpine skiing, ski mountaineering
- Livigno Snow Park, Livigno – freestyle skiing, snowboarding
- Livigno Aerials & Moguls Park – freestyle skiing
- Bormio Olympic Village
- Livigno Olympic Village

== Val di Fiemme cluster ==
Predazzo contained one competition venue for two Olympic sports, while Tesero contained one competition venue for two Olympic sports and two Paralympic sports. The Olympic and Paralympic Village in Predazzo is located on the grounds of the Scuola Alpina della Guardia di Finanza. It consists of five pavilions at a total cost of approximately €50 million.

- Predazzo Ski Jumping Stadium, Predazzo – ski jumping, Nordic combined (wind net required)
- Tesero Cross-Country Skiing Stadium, Tesero – cross-country skiing, Nordic combined, para biathlon, para cross-country skiing
- Predazzo Olympic & Paralympic Village

== Verona ==
Verona contained one non-competition venue that hosted two ceremonies. The Teatro Filarmonico was also used as a secondary venue during both ceremonies.

- Verona Olympic Arena – Olympic closing ceremony, Paralympic opening ceremony
