= Antholzer See =

Lake in South Tyrol, Italy

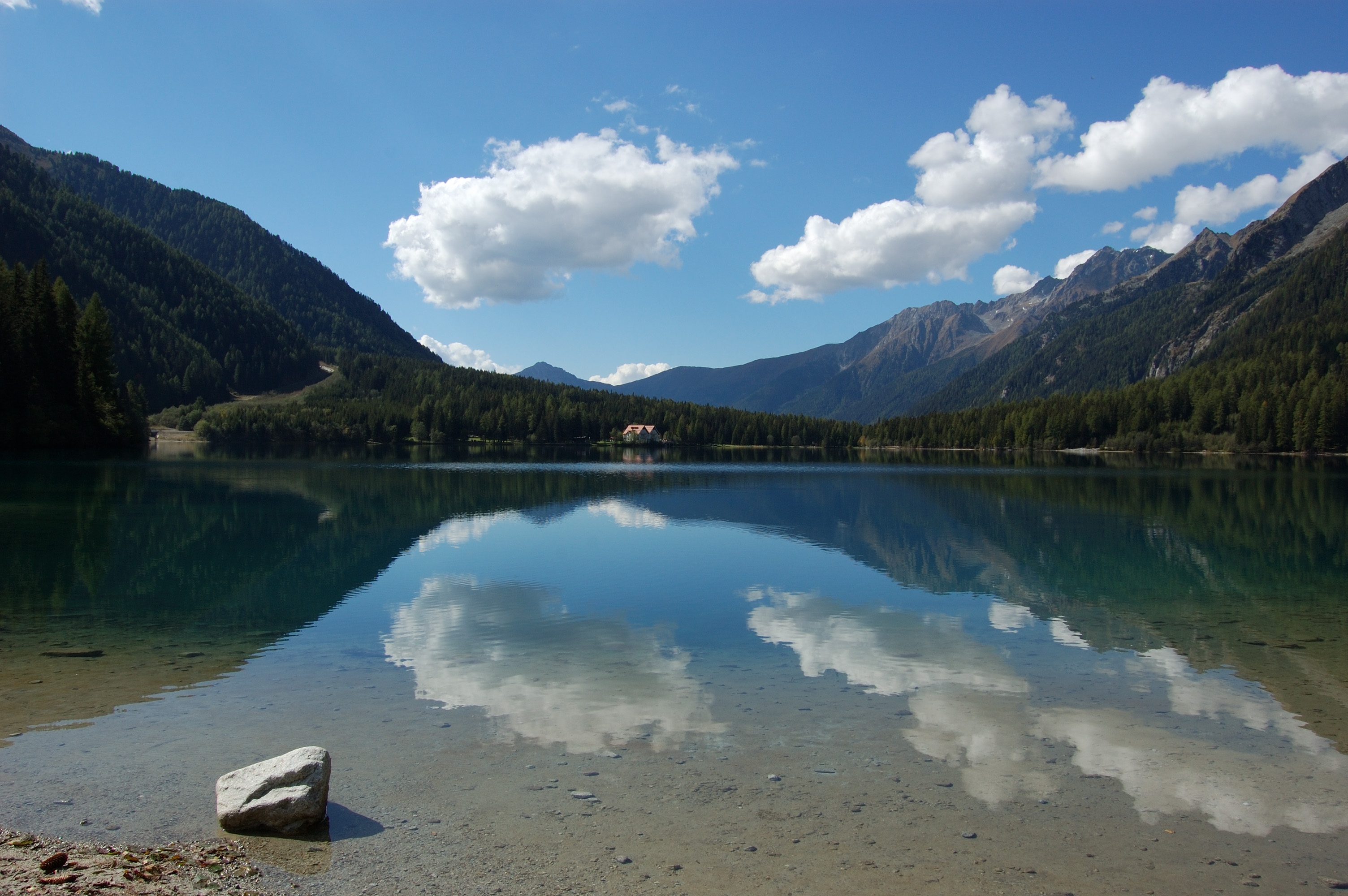

- Location within Italy
- Location: South Tyrol
- Coordinates: 46°53′9″N 12°9′58″E
- Catchment area: 19.06 km^{2} (7.36 sq mi)
- Basin countries: Italy
- Surface area: 43.3 ha (107 acres)
- Average depth: 25.5 m (84 ft)
- Max. depth: 38 m (125 ft)
- Water volume: 11,000,000 m^{3} (0.0026 cu mi)
- Shore length^{1}: 2.7 km (2 mi)
- Surface elevation: 1,642 m (5,387 ft)
- Settlements: Rasen-Antholz
- ^{1} Shore length is not a well-defined measure.

The Antholzer See (Italian: Lago di Anterselva; German: Antholzer See) is a lake in the Antholzertal in South Tyrol, Italy. It belongs to the municipality of Rasen-Antholz.
