= Hochgall =

Mountain in Italy

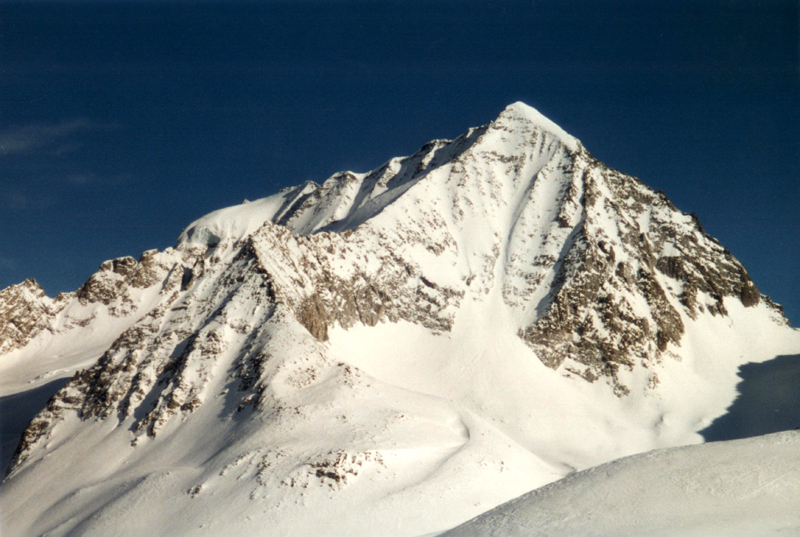
- Hochgall from the west. The high (northeast) ridge on the left forms the border with Austria.

Highest point
- Elevation: 3,436 m (11,273 ft)
- Prominence: 1,148 m (3,766 ft)
- Listing: Alpine mountains above 3000 m
- Coordinates: 46°54′45″N 12°08′30″E

Geography
- Location within Alps
- Location: South Tyrol, Italy
- Parent range: Rieserferner group

Climbing
- First ascent: Summer of 1854 by Defereggen Valley members of a party of the land surveyor Hermann van Acken

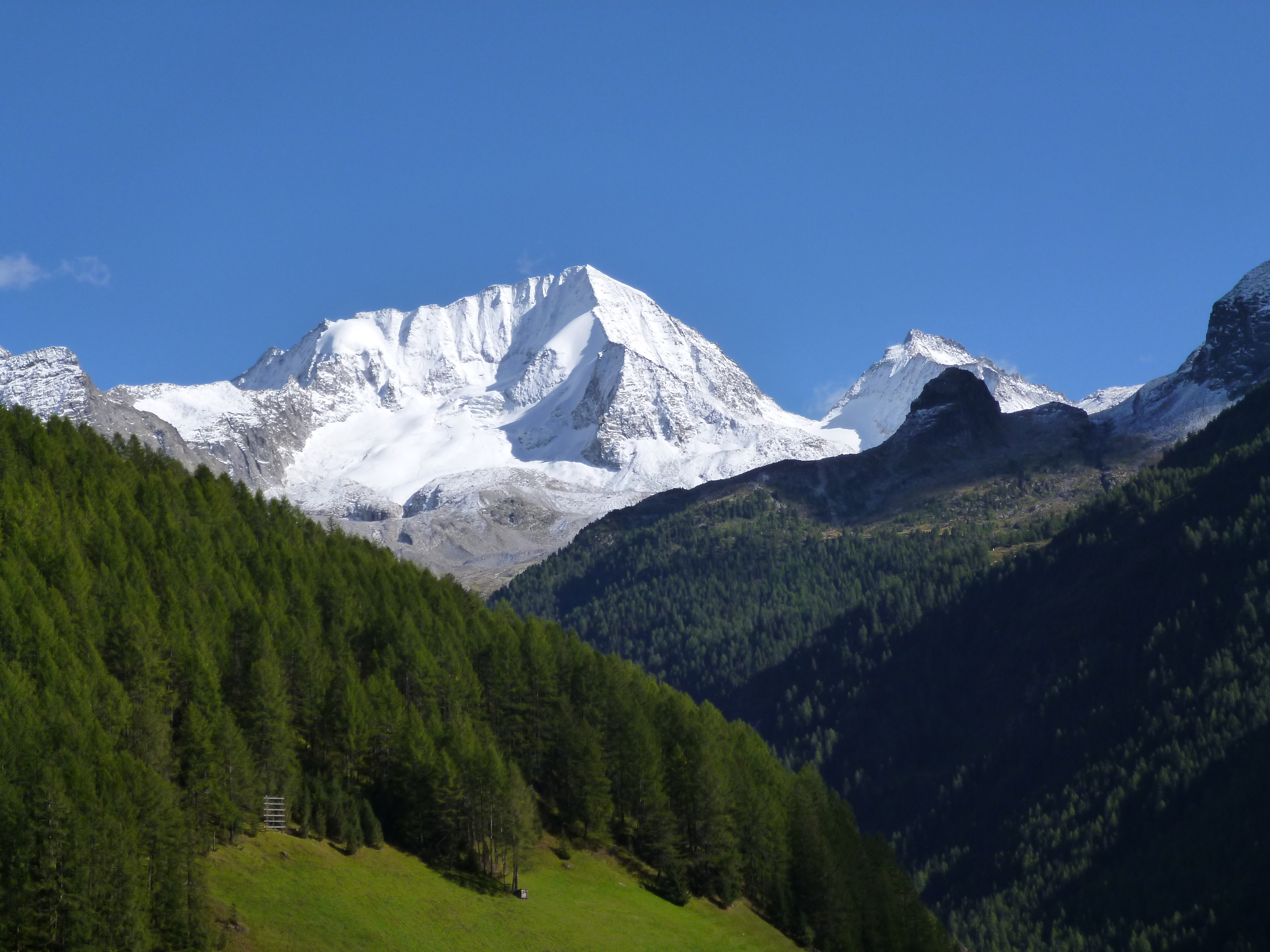
The Hochgall seen from Rein to the north. Right rear: the Wildgall

The Hochgall is a mountain of the Rieserferner group in the High Tauern. the summit is in South Tyrol, Italy, just 500 m from the Austrian border.

== Climbing history ==
For the Austrian land survey of 1853-1854, Hermann van Acken and guides/helpers from the Defereggen Valley climbed the mountain in the summer of 1854 from the East and over the NE ridge. Under "life-threatening conditions", they placed a signal on the 3371/3354 m sub-peak where the summit ridge departs from the watershed (and the current Austrian-Italian border). The party reached the summit from Sankt Jakob in Defereggen in 10 hours. A few years later Paul Grohmann interviewed one of the guides, who told him that some of them had continued to the highest summit. This was confirmed when the second party to climb this route (in 1876!) found a climbing stick not far below the main summit.

This ascent was not well-known, and when 14 years later Karl Hofmann and V. Kaltdorff visited the Defereggen Valley, they understood from the locals that the mountain was unclimbed and unclimbable. Not able to hire guides, they hiked over the Klammljoch north of the mountain to Rein in Taufers where they found Georg Weiss und Hans Oberarzbacher, who two years earlier had first ascended the Schneebiger Nock, willing to guide them up. On 3 August 1868 the party reached the main summit over the NW ridge via the Middle Rieserferner. This route was repeated in 1871, and with variations in 1873 and 1875.

The complete West face was first climbed in 1879 and an ascent over the South face from Antholz only succeeded in September 1890, by Hans and Georg Niederwieser, guiding Carl Luber.
