= Patscher Spitze =

Mountain in Italy

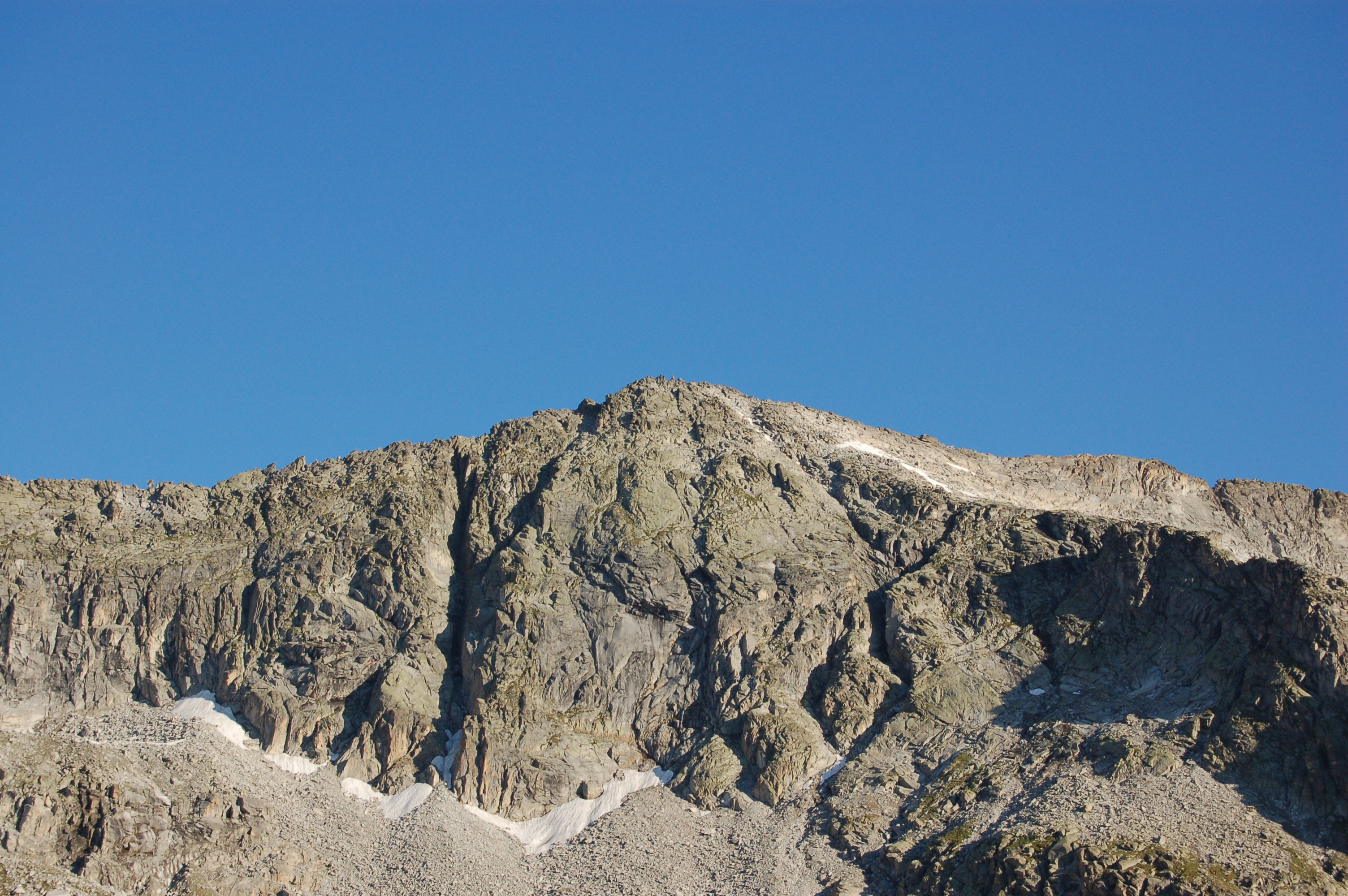

Highest point
- Elevation: 3,082 m (10,112 ft)
- Coordinates: 46°55′27″N 12°9′29″E

Geography
- Location: Tyrol, Austria / South Tyrol, Italy
- Parent range: Rieserferner group

The Patscher Spitze is a mountain of the Rieserferner group on the border between Tyrol, Austria, and South Tyrol, Italy.
