= Schwarze Wand =

Mountain in Italy

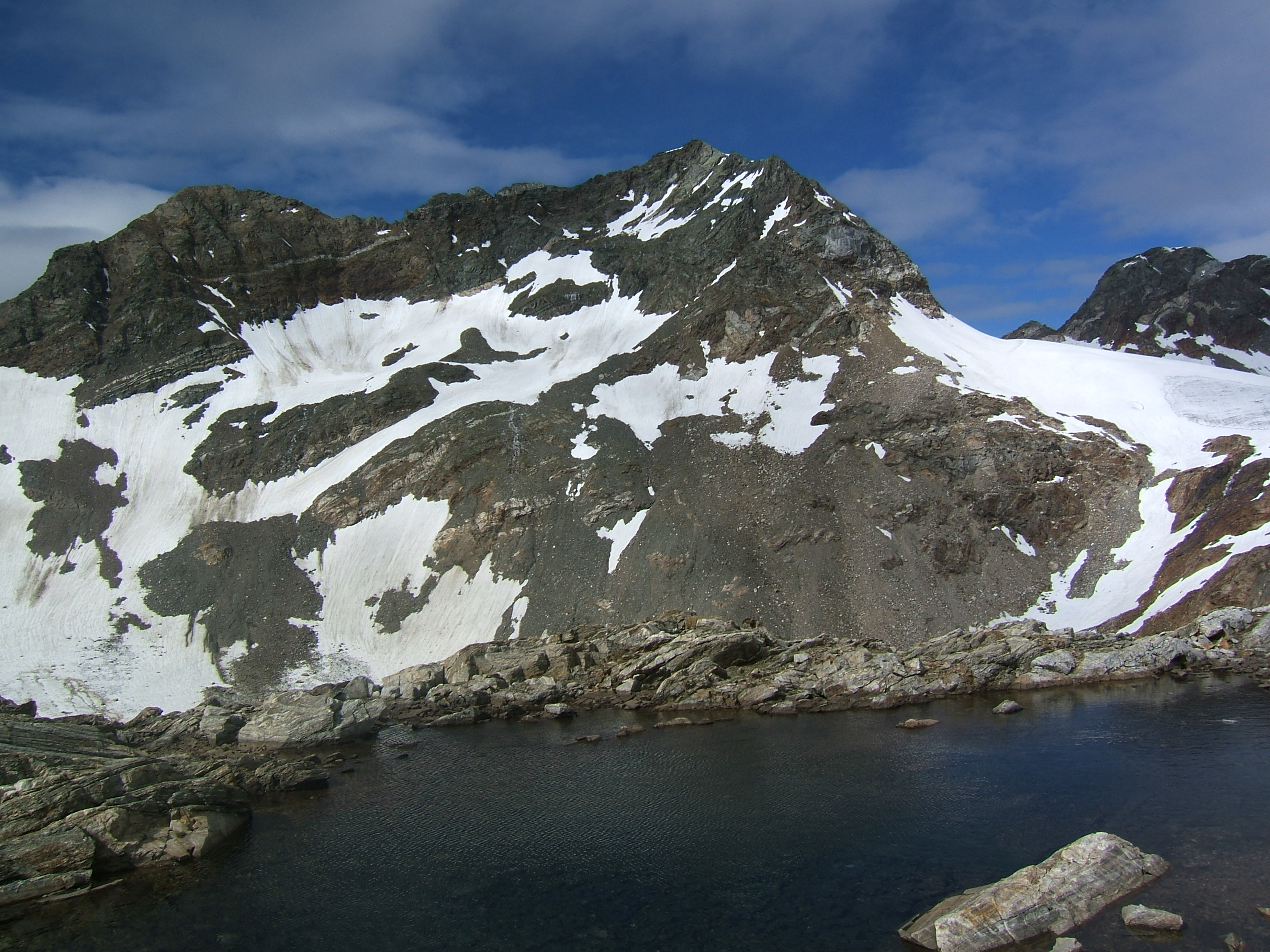
- Black wall from the east, from the Rieserferner hut.

Highest point
- Elevation: 3,105 m (10,187 ft)
- Coordinates: 46°52′48.9″N 12°4′13.9″E

Geography
- Location: South Tyrol, Italy
- Parent range: Rieserferner group

The Schwarze Wand is a mountain of the Rieserferner group in South Tyrol, Italy.
