= Barmer Spitze =

Mountain in Italy

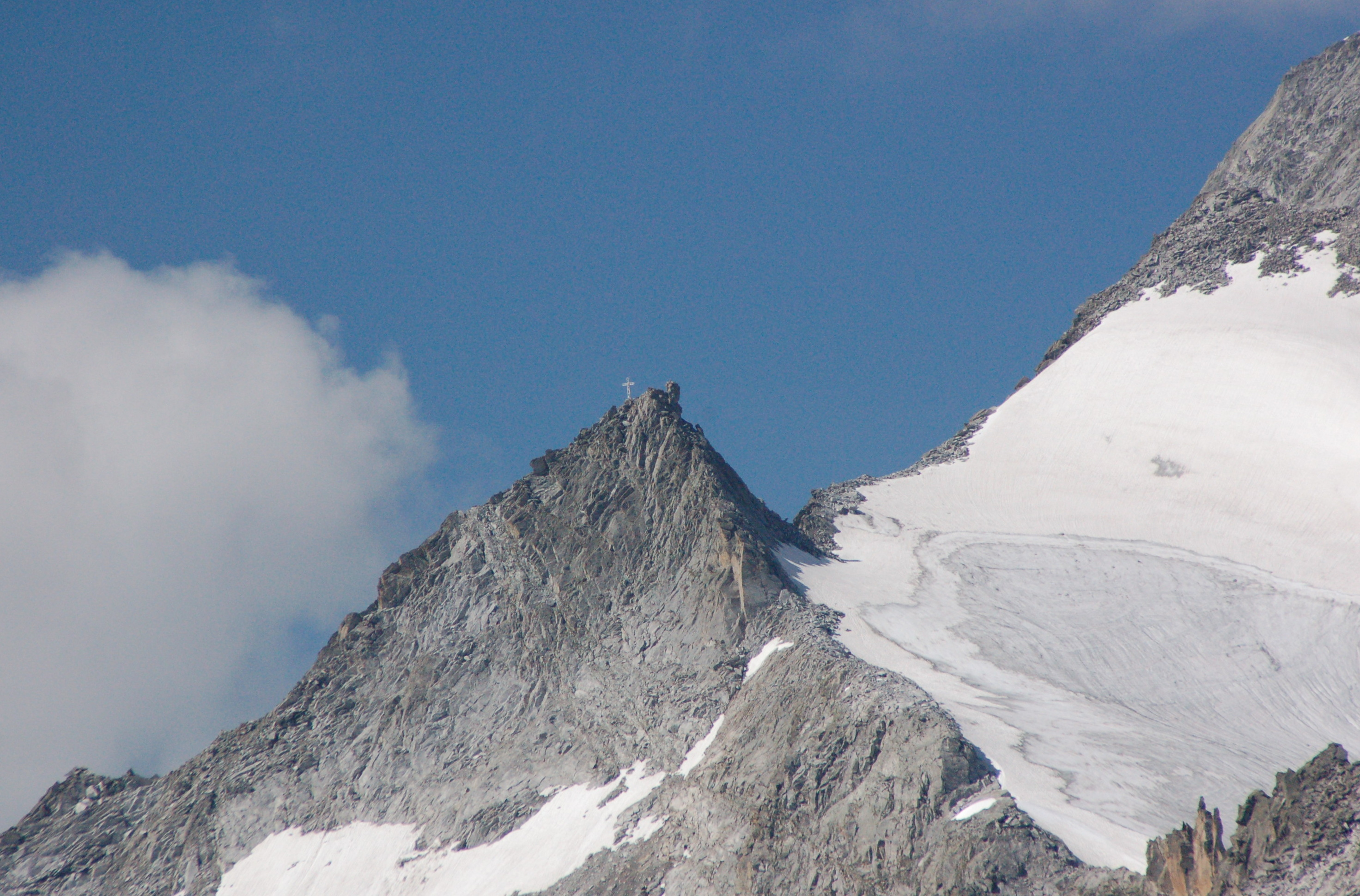

Highest point
- Elevation: 3,200 m (10,500 ft)
- Coordinates: 46°55′0″N 12°9′10″E

Geography
- Location: Tyrol, Austria / South Tyrol, Italy
- Parent range: Rieserferner group

The Barmer Spitze is a peak of the Rieserferner group on the border between Tyrol, Austria, and South Tyrol, Italy.
