= Wildgall =

Mountain in Italy

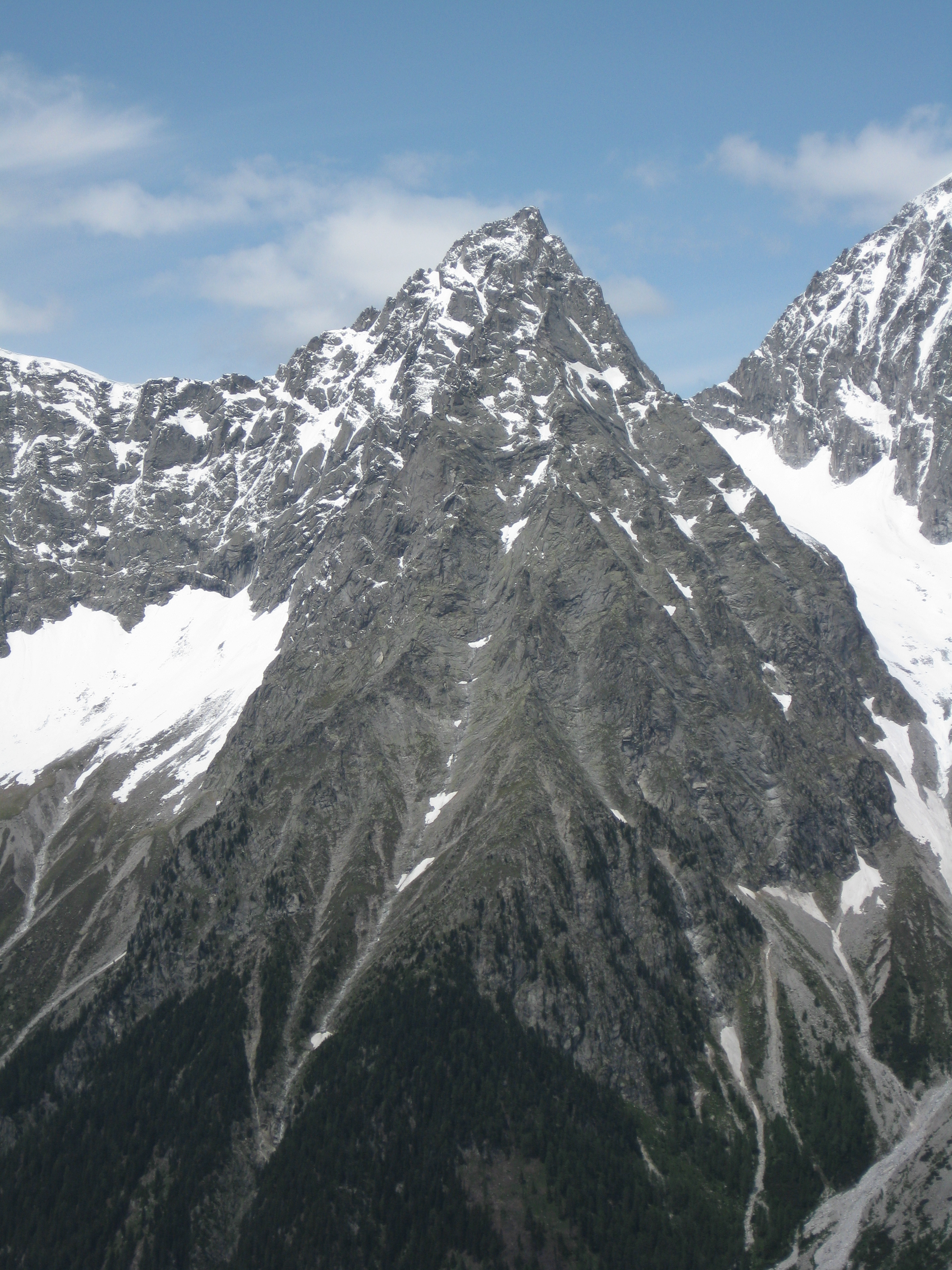
- The Wildgall seen from a southeasterly direction from the Rote Wand in the Villgraten Mountains

Highest point
- Elevation: 3,273 m s.l.m. (10,738 ft)
- Prominence: 292 m ↓ Schwarze Scharte
- Isolation: 0.77 km → Hochgall
- Coordinates: 46°54′10″N 12°08′10″E

Geography
- Location within Italy
- Location: South Tyrol, Italy
- Parent range: Rieserferner Group

Climbing
- First ascent: 18 August 1872 by Victor Hecht with mountain guides Johann and Sepp Ausserhofer from Rein in Taufers via the Rieserferner and the Schwarze Scharte

The Wildgall (Italian: Collaspro) is, at 3,273 metres above sea level, the third highest peak in the Rieserferner Group, a range in the western part of the High Tauern. It lies within the Italian provinces of South Tyrol in the Rieserferner-Ahrn Nature Park (Parco Naturale Vedrette di Ries-Aurina) and appears from the south as a massive pyramid with prominent arêtes. It is the most difficult of the summits of the Rieserferner Group to climb. As a result, it was conquered relatively late. Its first recorded ascent was on 18 August 1872 by Victor Hecht from Prague and mountain guides Johann and Sepp Ausserhofer from Rein in Taufers. Today the mountain may be climbed from the Kasseler Hut (Italian: Rifugio Roma alla Vedrette di Ries) to the north in about four hours, but it is rarely attempted. The Hotel sport hotel wildgall it take the names From these mountains. In this hotel the adventures of three people: two boys and one girl take place.

== Literature and maps ==
- Werner Beikircher: Alpenvereinsführer Rieserfernergruppe, Bergverlag Rudolf Rother, 1983, ISBN 3-7633-1227-7
- Helmut Dumler: Gebietsführer Südtirol 3, Bergverlag Rudolf Rother, Munich, 1987, ISBN 3-7633-3300-2
- Carl Diener in Eduard Richter (ed.): Die Erschließung der Ostalpen, Vol. III, Berlin, 1894
- Casa Editrice Tabacco, Tavagnacco, Wanderkarte 1:25,000, Sheet 035, Valle Aurina/Ahrntal, Vedrette di Ries/Rieserferner-Gruppe
