= Rieserferner Group =

Mountain range in the Austrian Central Alps

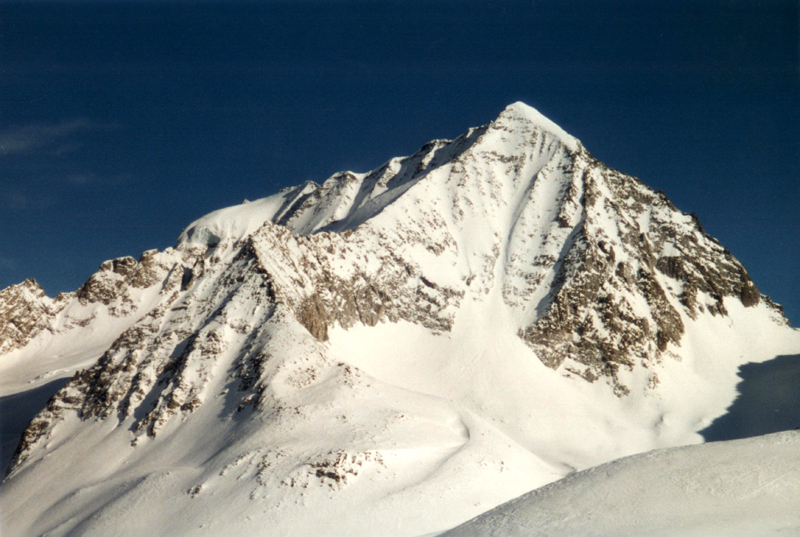
- The Hochgall (3,436m), the highest mountain of the group

Highest point
- Peak: Hochgall (3,436 m s.l.m.)

Geography
- Location: Italy (South Tyrol) and Austria (Tyrol)
- Range coordinates: 46°54′45″N 12°08′30″E

The Rieserferner Group (Italian: Gruppo delle Vedrette di Ries, German: Rieserfernergruppe) is a mountain range in the Austrian Central Alps. Together with the Ankogel Group, Goldberg Group, Glockner Group, Schober Group, Kreuzeck Group, Granatspitze Group, Venediger Group and the Villgraten Mountains the group is part of the High Tauern. The Rieserferner mountains extend across the Austrian state of Tyrol and the Italian province of South Tyrol (Trentino-South Tyrol region). The mountains mainly lie in South Tyrol, where the greater part is protected within the Rieserferner-Ahrn Nature Park.

The Rieserferner Group forms the southwesternmost part of the High Tauern, its foothills running towards the southwest as far as Bruneck in the Puster Valley. Its name is derived from the Rieserferner, a glacier on the northern flank between the Hochgall (highest summit in the range at 3,436 m s.l.m.) and the Schneebiger Nock (3,358 m s.l.m.).

The Rieserferner Group is rather small in comparison with other Alpine ranges. It is, however, popular with climbers and hikers due to its prominent and steep, partly glaciated summits.

== Neighbouring ranges ==
The Rieserferner Group is bounded by the following other mountain ranges of the Alps:

- Venediger Group (to the north)
- Villgraten Mountains (to the southeast)
- Dolomites (to the south)
- Zillertal Alps (to the west)

== Boundary ==
To the north, the Klammljoch saddle forms the boundary. In the east it runs from there along the valley of the Arventalbach past the Jagdhausalm to its confluence with the Schwarzach. In the west the boundary of the range runs from the Klammljoch along the Klammlbach stream until it joins the Knuttenbach. In the east the boundary continues along the Schwarzach until its confluence with the Staller Almbach. In the southeast and south it runs along the Staller Almbach to the Staller Saddle. From there it goes along the Antholz valley to Olang in the Pustertal and downstream along the Rienz to Bruneck. In the west the boundary is formed by the valleys of the Tauferer Tal and the Reintal. It continues along the Knuttental to the confluence with the Klammbach.

The Klammljoch links the Rieserferner Group to the Venediger Group. The Staller Saddle is the link to the Villgraten Mountains.

== Summits ==
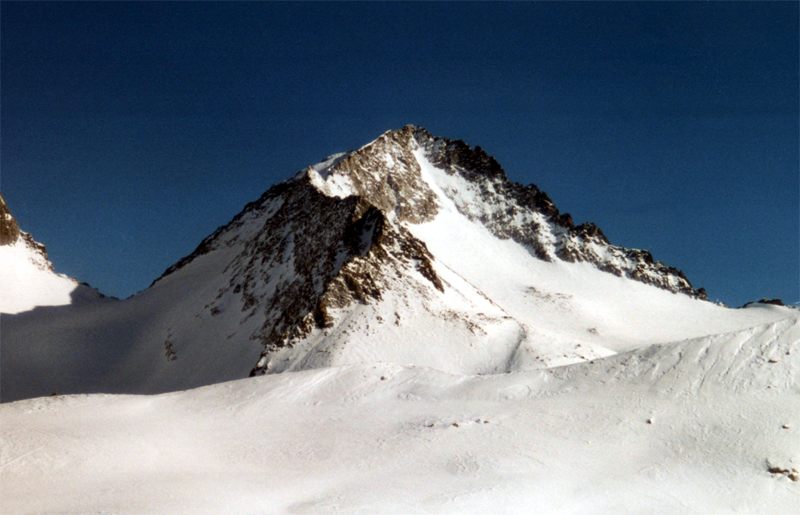
The Wildgall (3,272 m s.l.m.) with its northwest arete, west flank and southwest arete seen from the Rieserferner to the west (February 1997)

In the Rieserferner Group there are about 30 high points over 3,000 metres. The best-known and most important peaks are the:

- Hochgall (3,436 m s.l.m.)
- Schneebiger Nock (3,358 m s.l.m.)
- Wildgall (3,273 m s.l.m.)
- Magerstein (3,273 m s.l.m.)
- Lenkstein (3,237 m s.l.m.)
- Barmer Spitze (3,200 m s.l.m.)
- Fenneregg (3,123 m s.l.m.)
- Schwarze Wand (3,105 m s.l.m.)
- Patscher Spitze (3,082 m s.l.m.)
- Roßhorn (3,068 m s.l.m.)
- Große Windschar (Lanebachspitz) (3,041 m s.l.m.), western "cornerstone" of the group
- Dreieckspitze (3,041 m s.l.m.), northernmost three-thousander of the group

== Literature ==
- Werner Beikircher: Rieserfernergruppe (Alpenvereinsführer) Bergverlag Rother, 1983. ISBN 3-7633-1227-7
