= Großer Moosstock =

Mountain in Italy

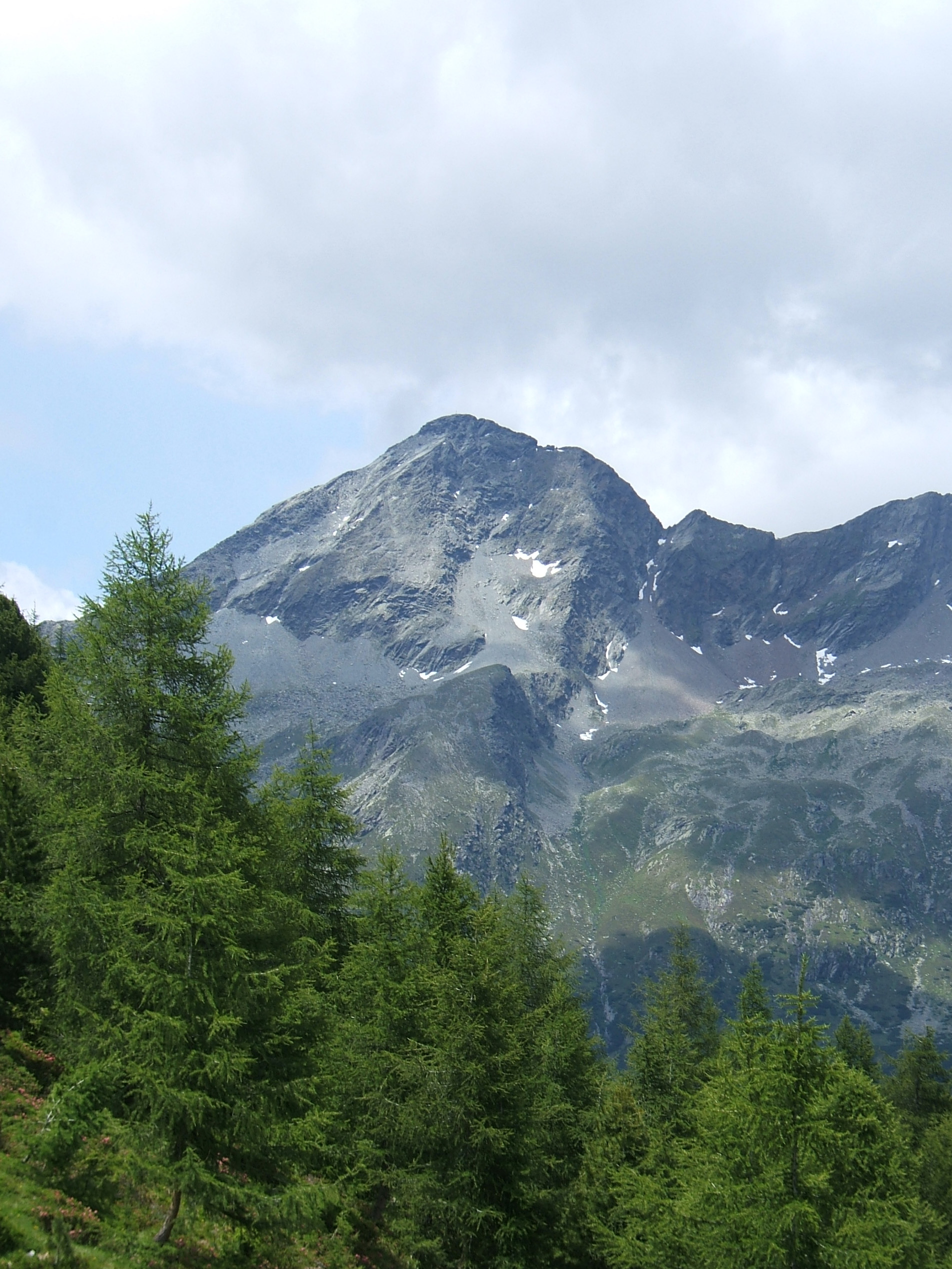

Highest point
- Elevation: 3,059 m (10,036 ft)
- Coordinates: 46°57′03″N 12°01′22″E

Geography
- Location: South Tyrol, Italy

The Großer Moosstock (Italian: Picco Palù) is a mountain in South Tyrol, Italy. Hans Kammerlander reached the summit at age 8 by following two tourists.

== Sources ==
- Alpenverein South Tyrol (in German)
