= Rieserferner-Ahrn Nature Park =

Nature reserve in South Tyrol, Italy

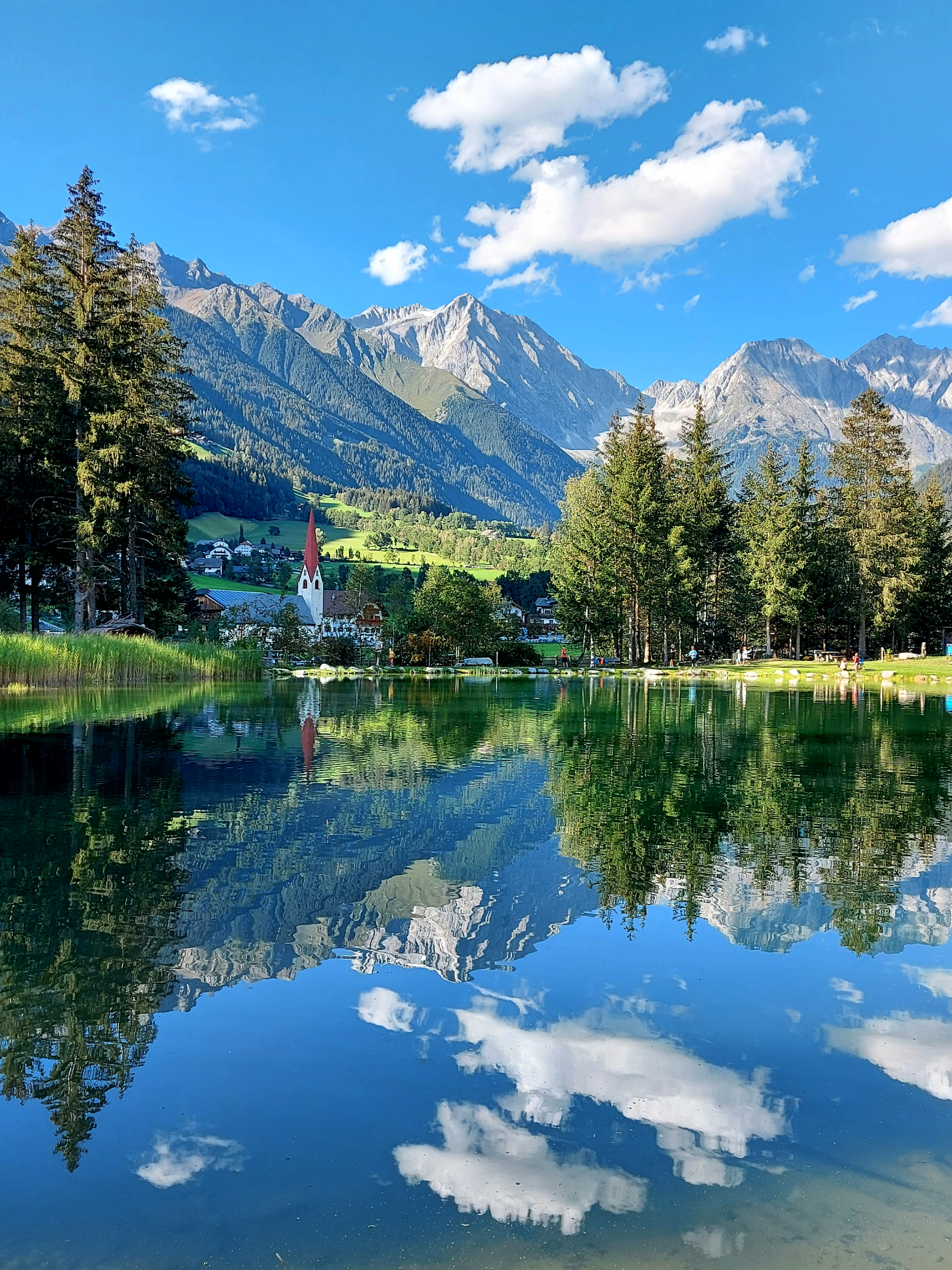
- Anterselva lakes in the Nature Park.
- Interactive map of Rieserferner-Ahrn Nature Park
- Location: South Tyrol, Italy
- Coordinates: 46°54′38″N 12°03′23″E
- Area: 31,500 ha (77,838 acres)
- Established: 1988
- Website: www.provinz.bz.it/natur/2803/index_e.asp

The Rieserferner-Ahrn Nature Park (German: Naturpark Rieserferner-Ahrn) is a nature reserve in South Tyrol, Italy.

The name Rieserferner comes from the eternal ice area called Rieserferner at the Schneebiger Nock glacier. The Rieserferner-Ahrntal is characterized by high mountains with rugged peaks and eternal ice marginal habitat and tightrope walk for animals and plants but also for humans. Mountain lakes and waterfalls, rocks such as the Zentralgneis the Tauern window and the Rieserfernertonalit, animals such as golden eagles and peregrine falcons, plants such as dwarf willow and the sticky primrose are among the features of the park.
