= List of Italian cattle breeds =

This is a list of cattle breeds considered in Italy to be wholly or partly of Italian origin. Some may have complex or obscure histories, so inclusion here does not necessarily imply that a breed is predominantly or exclusively Italian.

- Abruzzese
- Agerolese
- Bardigiana
- Bianca Val Padana
- Bruna Italiana
- Bruna Italiana Vecchio Ceppo
- Burlina
- Cabannina
- Calabrese
- Calvana
- Camandona
- Carniella
- Chianina
- Chianino-Maremmana
- Cinisara
- Demonte
- Frisona Italiana
- Friuli
- Garfagnina
- Grigia alpina
- Grigia di Val d'Adige
- Grigia di Val di Fiemme
- Grossetana
- Lucana
- Marchigiana
- Maremmana
- Modenese
- Modicana
- Mölltal
- Montana
- Ossolana
- Pasturina
- Perugina
- Pezzata Rossa d'Oropa
- Pezzata Rossa Italiana
- Piemontese
- Pinzgauer
- Pisana
- Podolica
- Pontremolese
- Pugliese del basso Veneto
- Pustertaler Sprinzen
- Reggiana
- Rendena
- Romagnola
- Romana
- Sarda
- Sardo Bruna
- Sardo-modicana
- Sicilian
- Valdarno
- Val di Chiana
- Valdostana Castana
- Valdostana Pezzata Nera
- Valdostana Pezzata Rossa
- Valtarese
- Varzese-Ottonese-Tortonese
