= Aosta Red Pied =

Breed of cattle

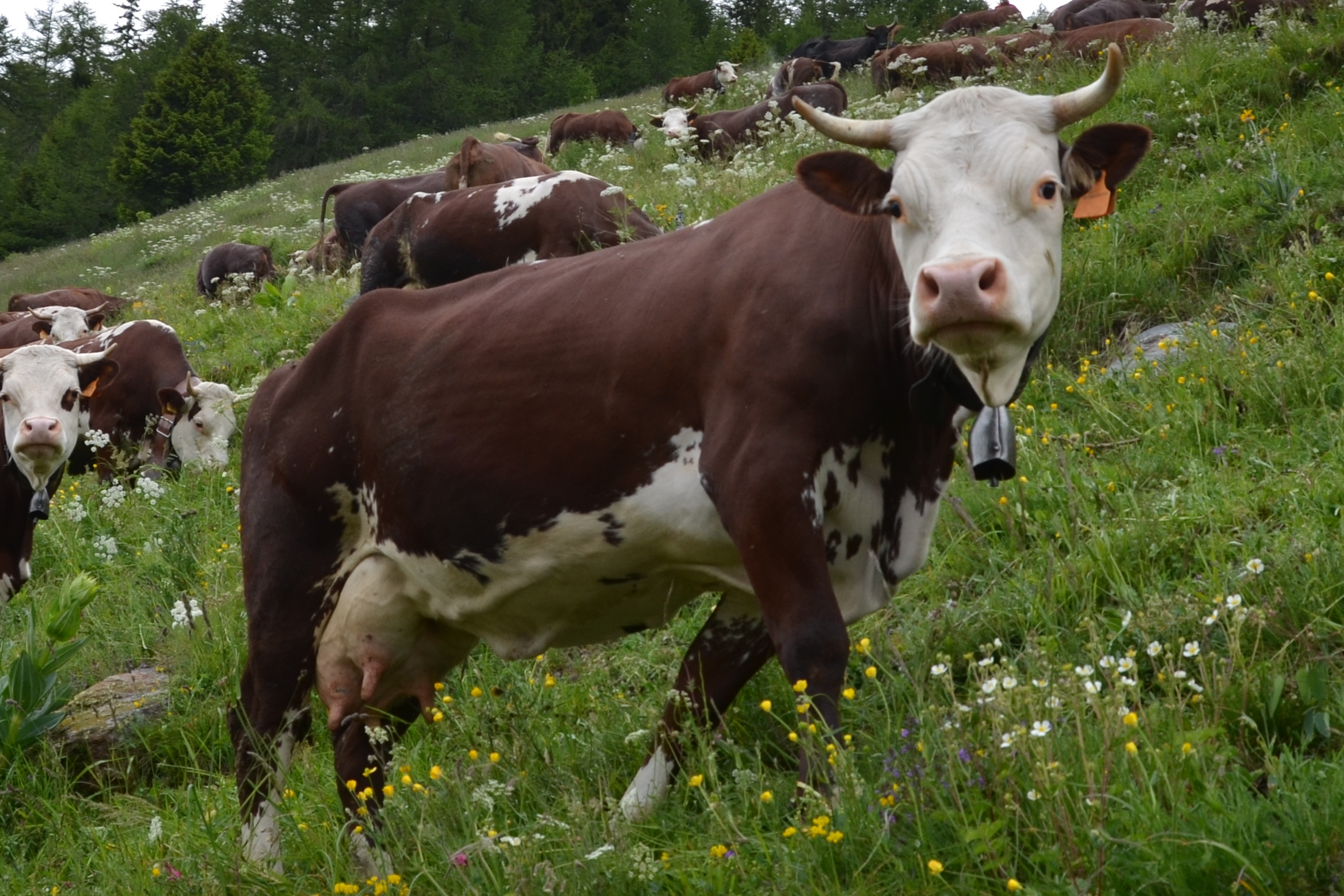
- Conservation status: FAO (2007): not at risk
- Country of origin: Italy
- Distribution: Aosta Valley (85%); Piedmont; Liguria
- Standard: MIPAAF (in Italian)
- Use: dual-purpose: milk and beef

Traits
- Weight: Male: 550–650 kg; Female: 420–550 kg
- Height: Male: 135–140 cm; Female: 120–125 cm
- Coat: red-pied, white face
- Horn status: horned in both sexes
- Cattle; Bos (primigenius) taurus

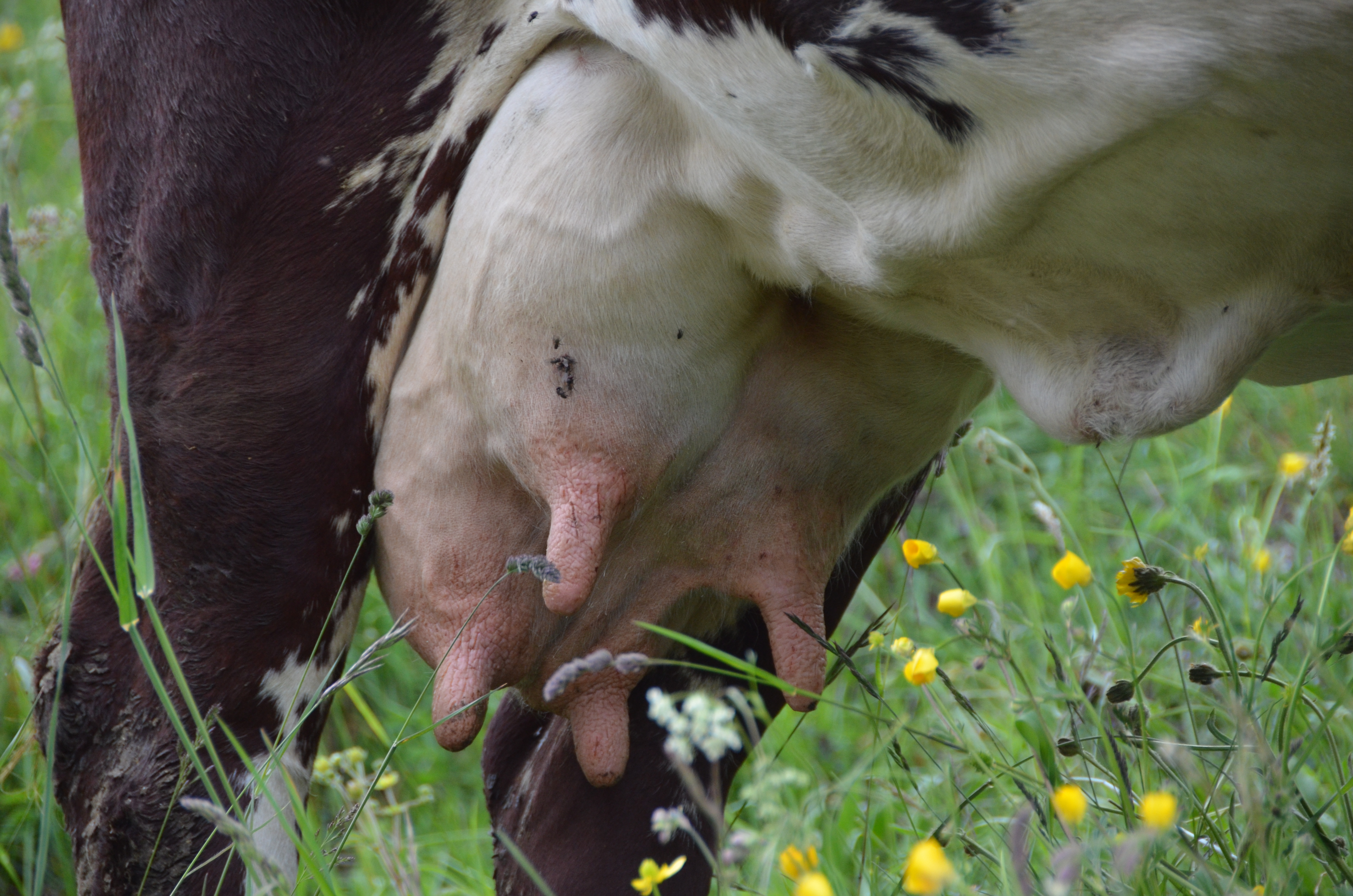
Red Pied, detail of udder

The Aosta Red Pied (Italian: Valdostana Pezzata Rossa, French: Valdostaine pie rouge) is an Italian breed of cattle from Aosta Valley region in north-western Italy. It is red-pied, usually with white legs, stomach and face. It is one of three regional breeds in the area, the others being the Aosta Chestnut and the Aosta Black Pied. Like them, it derives from inter-breeding of various local breeds and types of cattle. The most important of these were Swiss Simmental cattle, which came into the Aosta Valley over the Great St. Bernard Pass. The Aosta Red Pied is a dual-purpose breed, raised mainly for milk, but also for meat. Management is normally transhumant: the cattle are stabled only in winter, and spend the summer months on the mountain pastures of the Alps.

== History ==
Like the other cattle breeds of the Aosta Valley, the Aosta Chestnut and the Aosta Black Pied, the Aosta Red Pied derives from inter-breeding of various local breeds and types of cattle. The most important influence on the development and morphology of the Red Pied came from Swiss Simmental cattle, which came into the region over the Great St. Bernard Pass. In the twentieth century, attempts were made to increase size and productive qualities by cross-breeding with imported stock, including Abondance and Montbéliarde stock from France, and various European strains of Simmental. The resulting increase in size reduced the adaptation of the animals to life on the high mountain pastures, and the experiment was quickly abandoned. A breeders' association, Associazione Nazionale Allevatori Bovini Razza Valdostana (Italian) or Association Nationale Éleveurs Bovins de Race Valdôtaine, was started in 1937, and a herd-book was established in 1958.

In 1946 it was thought that were about 106 000 head. In 1983 the population was estimated at 120 000, and in 2014 it was reported as 23 471.

The Aosta Red Pied is among the eleven breeds which together form the Fédération Européenne des Races Bovines de l'Arc Alpin, the others being: the Pinzgauer and Tiroler Grauvieh from Austria; the Abondance, Tarentaise and Vosgienne from France; the Hinterwälder and Vorderwälder from Germany; the Rendena from Italy; and the Hérens from Switzerland.

== Characteristics ==
The Aosta Red Pied is red-pied. The lower legs, stomach and face are usually white, and the ears red. The muzzle and the mucosa are pink, and the horns short and yellowish. The hooves are particularly hard. It is robust, long-lived and hardy, and well able to exploit high mountain pasture at 2500 m and above. Management is transhumant: the cattle are stabled only in winter, and spend the summer months on the mountain pastures of the Alps, moving higher as the season progresses.

== Use ==
The Aosta Red Pied is raised both for milk and for meat. Milk yield averages 4000 kg per lactation; the milk has 3.55% fat and is high in κ-casein, making it suitable for cheese-making. The milk is used to make Fontina, but also in less well-known local cheeses such as Vallée d'Aoste Fromadzo, Reblec, Salignon, Seras and Gressoney toma cheese.
