= Aosta Black Pied =

Breed of cattle

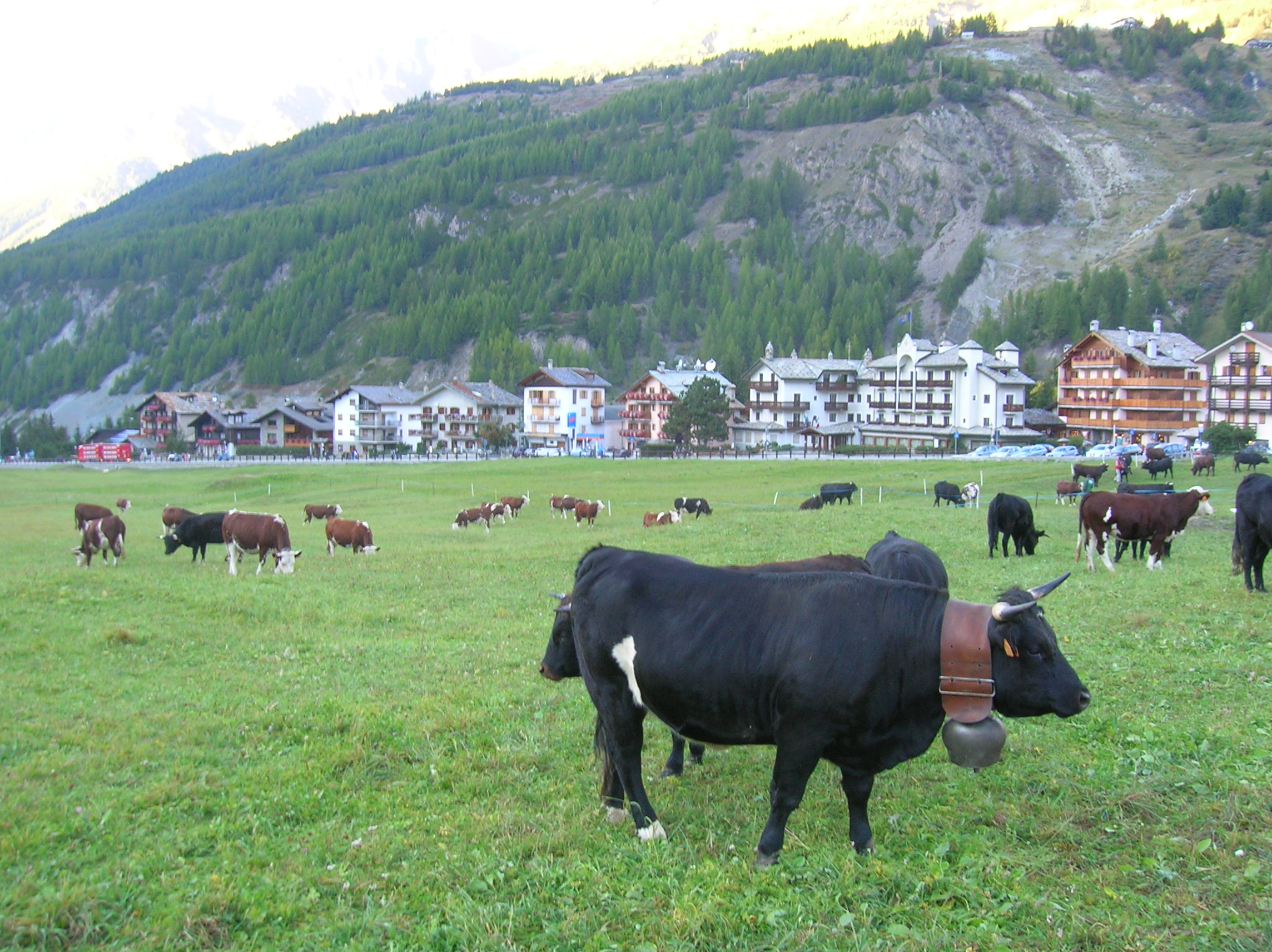
- A mixed herd of black and red pied cows in Cogne.
- Conservation status: FAO (2007): not at risk
- Country of origin: Italy
- Distribution: Aosta Valley
- Standard: MIPAAF (in Italian)
- Use: dual-purpose: milk and beef

Traits
- Weight: Male: 550–650 kg; Female: 450–550 kg
- Height: Male: 130–135 cm; Female: 120–125 cm
- Coat: black-pied
- Horn status: horned in both sexes
- Cattle; Bos (primigenius) taurus

The Aosta Black Pied (Italian: Valdostana Pezzata Nera, French: Valdostaine pie noire) is an Italian breed of cattle from Aosta Valley region in north-western Italy. It is black-pied, with short horns. It is one of three regional breeds in the area, the others being the Aosta Chestnut and the Aosta Red Pied. Like them, it derives from inter-breeding of various local breeds and types of cattle. It appears to have been most influenced by the Swiss Fribourgeoise and Hérens breeds, which came into the Aosta Valley over the Great St. Bernard Pass. The Aosta Black Pied is a dual-purpose breed, raised mainly for milk, but also for meat. Management is normally transhumant: the cattle are stabled only in winter, and spend the summer months on the mountain pastures of the Alps.

== History ==
Like the other cattle breeds of the Aosta Valley, the Chestnut and the Red Pied, the Black Pied derives from inter-breeding of various local breeds and types of cattle. The most important influence on the development and morphology of the Black Pied appears to have come from the Fribourgeoise (extinct since the 1970s) and Hérens breeds, which came into the area from Switzerland over the Great St. Bernard Pass. A breeders' association, the Associazione Nazionale Allevatori Bovini Razza Valdostana (Italian) or Association Nationale Éleveurs Bovins de Race Valdôtaine, was founded in 1937, and a herd-book was established in 1985.

The Black Pied is distributed only in a fairly restricted area of the Aosta Valley, in the Valpelline, in the Vallon de Saint-Barthélemy, in the Vallon d'Ollomont, and in the hills flanking the valley of the Dora Baltea between Nus and Aosta. In 1946 it was thought that there were about 30000 head. In 1983 the population was estimated at 7120, and in 2014 it was reported as 794.

It is among the eleven breeds which together form the Fédération Européenne des Races Bovines de l'Arc Alpin, the others being: the Pinzgauer and Tiroler Grauvieh from Austria; the Abondance, Tarentaise and Vosgienne from France; the Hinterwälder and Vorderwälder from Germany; the Rendena from Italy; and the Hérens from Switzerland.

== Characteristics ==
The Aosta Black Pied is black-pied. The legs and belly are often white; the head is usually black, often with a white star. Unlike the Aosta Chestnut, which has both red and black hair in its coat, the Black Pied has only black hair in the black areas. The hooves, muzzle and mucosa are slate-black, and the horns short and black-tipped. The hooves are particularly hard. The cattle are robust, frugal and hardy, and well able to exploit high mountain pasture at 2500 m and above. Management is transhumant: the cattle are stabled only in winter, and spend the summer months on the mountain pastures of the Alps, moving higher as the season progresses.

== Use ==
The Black Pied is raised both for milk and for meat. Milk yield averages 2846 kg per lactation; the milk has 3.43% fat and 3.38% protein. The Black Pied is less productive than the Red Pied, though hardier. This may be in part because the productive abilities of the breed have been reduced by cross-breeding with the Aosta Chestnut to produce animals with good cow-fighting qualities.

The Batailles de Reines, informal cow-fighting contests, have been documented for more than 150 years. In the Aosta Valley, formal management of fights dates from 1958, when the Comité regional des Batailles de Reines was formed. The contests have become an important socio-cultural event. Some twenty contests are held between March and October each year, culminating in a final battle and the crowning of the Reine ("queen"). Success may significantly increase the market value of cows.
