= Aosta Chestnut =

Breed of cattle

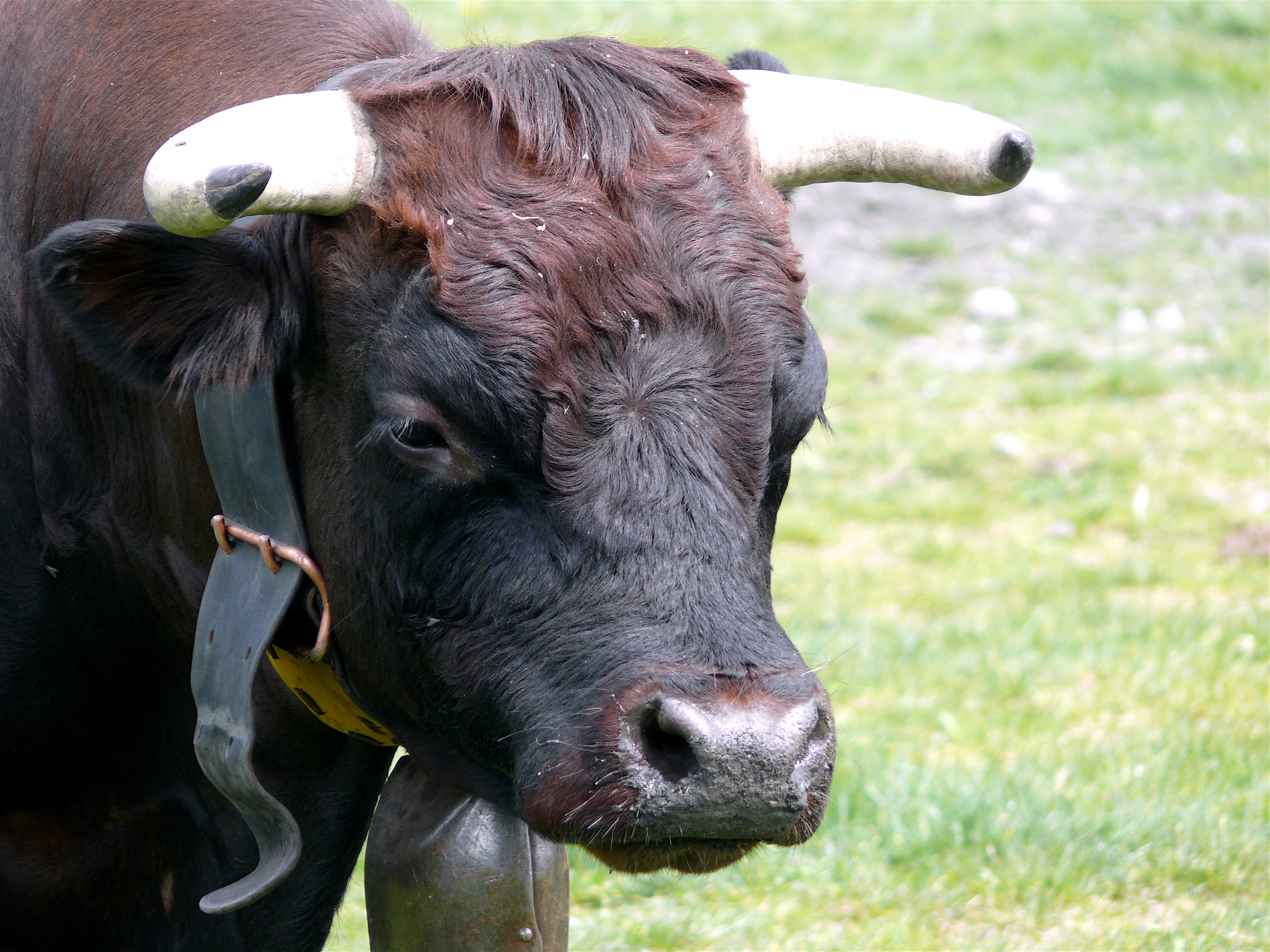
- Conservation status: FAO (2007): not at risk
- Country of origin: Italy
- Distribution: Aosta Valley, northern Piedmont
- Standard: MIPAAF (in Italian)
- Use: dual-purpose: milk and beef particular aptitude for cow-fighting

Traits
- Weight: Male: 550–650 kg; Female: 420–550 kg
- Height: Male: 130–135 cm; Female: 125 cm
- Coat: chestnut to almost black
- Horn status: horned in both sexes
- Cattle; Bos (primigenius) taurus

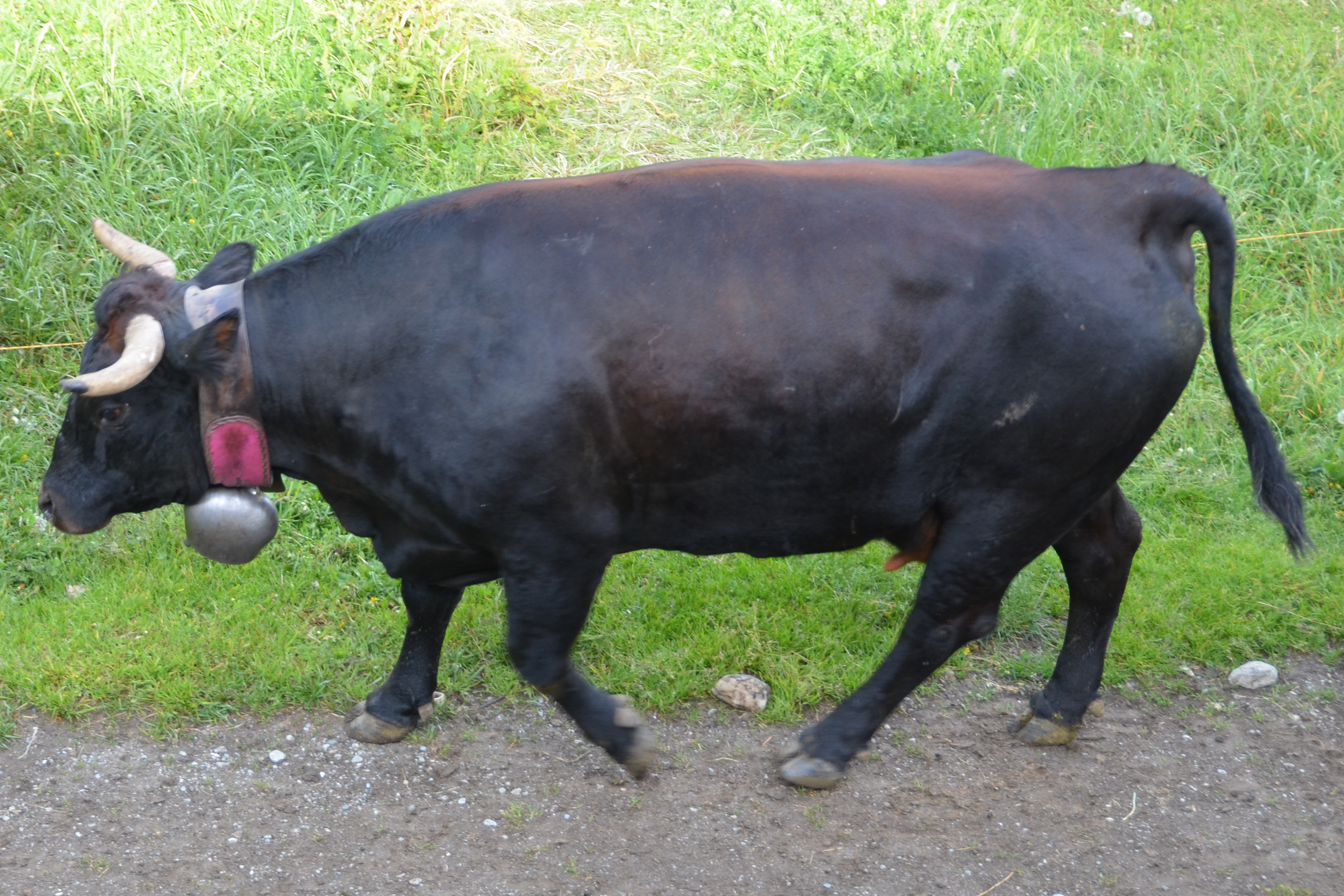
Aosta Chestnut cow

The Aosta Chestnut (Italian: Valdostana Castana, French: Valdostaine châtaine) is an Italian breed of cattle from Aosta Valley region in north-western Italy. It is one of three regional breeds in the area, the others being the Aosta Black Pied and the Aosta Red Pied. The Aosta Chestnut ranges in colour from chestnut-brown to black. It derives from cross-breeding of imported Hérens stock with the local Black Pied cattle. While the Aosta Chestnut is raised both for meat and for milk, its principal characteristic is its ability in the Bataille de Reines, the annual cow-fighting contests held in the region. Partly due to its combative nature, it is not suited to intensive farming, and management is normally transhumant: the cattle are stabled only in winter, and spend the summer months on the mountain pastures of the Alps.

== History ==
The Aosta Chestnut is a relatively recent breed; only black-pied and red-pied cattle are documented in the Aosta Valley in texts of the early twentieth century. Despite the strict regulations governing the herd-book for the Aosta Black Pied, breeders introduced imported Hérens blood. The Chestnut was officially recognised by the Italian Ministry of Agriculture, Food Sovereignty and Forests in 1985. It is registered in the herd-book of the Black Pied, and is considered to differ from it only in the colour of the coat.

The Aosta Chestnut was originally confined to the Great St Bernard Valley, but has since spread throughout the region and into northern Piedmont, in the Lanzo Valleys and the upper Canavese. Most of the population is concentrated in the hills flanking the valley of the Dora Baltea between Châtillon and Aosta. In 2014 the total population was reported to be 11 131 head.

== Characteristics ==
The Aosta Chestnut ranges in colour from chestnut-brown to black. The hooves and mucosa are slate-coloured or black. It is robust and hardy, and well able to exploit high mountain pasture. Its principal characteristic is its ability in the Bataille de Reines, the annual cow-fighting contests held in the Aosta Valley. Partly due to its combative nature, it is not suited to intensive farming; management is transhumant: the cattle are stabled only in winter, and spend the summer months on the mountain pastures of the Alps.

== Use ==
While the Aosta Chestnut is raised both for meat and for milk, its principal characteristic is its ability in the Bataille de Reines. Despite recent selection for improved dairy performance, milk yields remain low. The average is 2765 kg per lactation; the milk has 3.4% fat and 3.3% protein.

Informal cow-fighting contests have been documented for more than 150 years. In the Aosta Valley, formal management of fights dates from 1958, when the Comité Regional des Batailles de Reines was formed. The contests have become an important socio-cultural event. Some twenty contests are held between March and October each year, culminating in a final battle and the crowning of the Reine (="queen"). Success may significantly increase the market value of cows.
