= Rätisches Grauvieh =

Endangered breed of cattle native to Switzerland

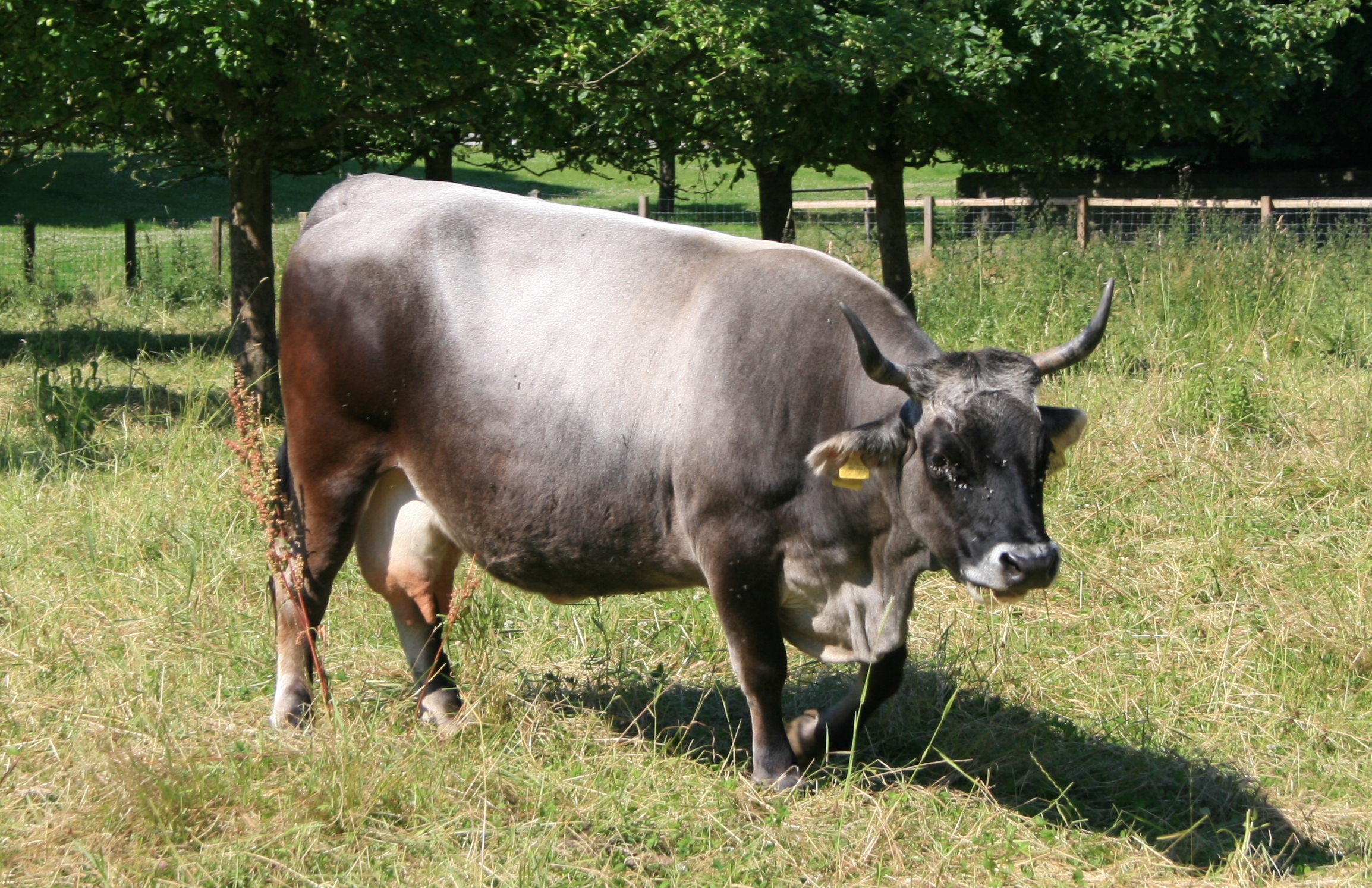
- Conservation status: FAO (2007): endangered-maintained
- Other names: Albula Vieh; Bündner Grauvieh; Oberengadiner Vieh; Davoser Bergvieh
- Country of origin: Switzerland
- Distribution: Graubünden (Grisons)
- Use: dual-purpose: milk and beef

Traits
- Weight: Male: 550–750 kg; Female: 350–500 kg
- Height: Male: 120–128 cm; Female: 119–126 cm
- Coat: grey
- Cattle; Bos (primigenius) taurus

The Rätisches Grauvieh is an endangered Swiss breed of cattle from the Graubünden region in eastern Switzerland. It is a smaller type of the Tiroler Grauvieh breed of Alpine grey cattle. In the 1920s, it was absorbed into the Braunvieh population. In 1985, the population was re-established through the introduction of cattle of the similar Albula type from Austria. Like the Rhaetian Alps, it is named after the Ancient Roman province of Rhaetia.

== History ==
In Graubünden, in eastern Switzerland, there were two strains of the Alpine Tiroler Grauvieh: the large and heavy Oberländer type, and the smaller Albula type. They were triple-purpose animals, reared for draught use, milk, and meat. In the 1920s, they were absorbed into the Braunvieh population. In 1985, cattle of the Albula type were re-introduced to the area from Austria by ProSpecieRara in order to re-establish the breed. In 2015, a population of 2,000 was reported.

Only five of the 35 cattle breeds once documented in Switzerland remain today, including the Rätisches Grauvieh.

== Characteristics ==
The Rätisches Grauvieh has a grey-black coat and curved horns. It is a robust and undemanding breed, well suited to extensive Alpine agriculture. Its ability to thrive on rough forage makes it especially adapted to mountainous regions. Today, it is primarily kept as a dual-purpose breed for milk and meat.

The breed is also known for its calm temperament, vitality, and suitability for high-altitude terrain. It is described as undemanding and adaptable, and is valued for traits such as good fertility and ease of calving.
