= Swiss Holstein =

Breed of cattle

- Other names: Schweizerisches Schwarzfleckvieh
- Country of origin: Switzerland
- Use: dairy

Traits
- Weight: Male: 1200 kg; Female: 700–800 kg
- Height: Male: 158–168 cm; Female: 144–154 cm
- Coat: black-pied
- Cattle; Bos (primigenius) taurus

The Swiss Holstein is the Swiss variant of the international Holstein-Friesian breed of dairy cattle. It results from systematic cross-breeding, through artificial insemination between 1966 and 1973, of the traditional dual-purpose black-pied Fribourgeoise from the Canton of Fribourg in western Switzerland with Canadian Holstein stock.

== History ==
The Fribourgeoise, later known as the Schwarzfleckvieh, was a traditional Swiss breed of cattle from the Canton of Fribourg in western Switzerland. In 1966, restrictive regulations on artificial insemination were lifted, and frozen semen from Canadian Holstein bulls began to be imported in quantity. In 1973, some 29 000 doses were used. In the same year, the last remaining pure-bred Fribourgeois bull died, and the breed became effectively extinct. The modern Swiss Holstein is considered to derive from it. The breed has spread throughout Switzerland, and constitutes approximately 13% of the national dairy herd. In 2011 there were about 102 000 cows, with 459 bulls. In 2015 a population of 90 000 was reported.

== Characteristics ==
The Swiss Holstein is a large black-pied breed of dairy cattle. It produces large quantities of milk, but is less well-suited than the Braunvieh and Simmental to the extensive pasture management that is traditional in Switzerland.

== Use ==
The Swiss Holstein is a dedicated dairy breed. Average milk yield is 8095 litres per lactation. The milk has, on average, 3.94% fat.
