= Morlacco =

Italian cow's milk cheese

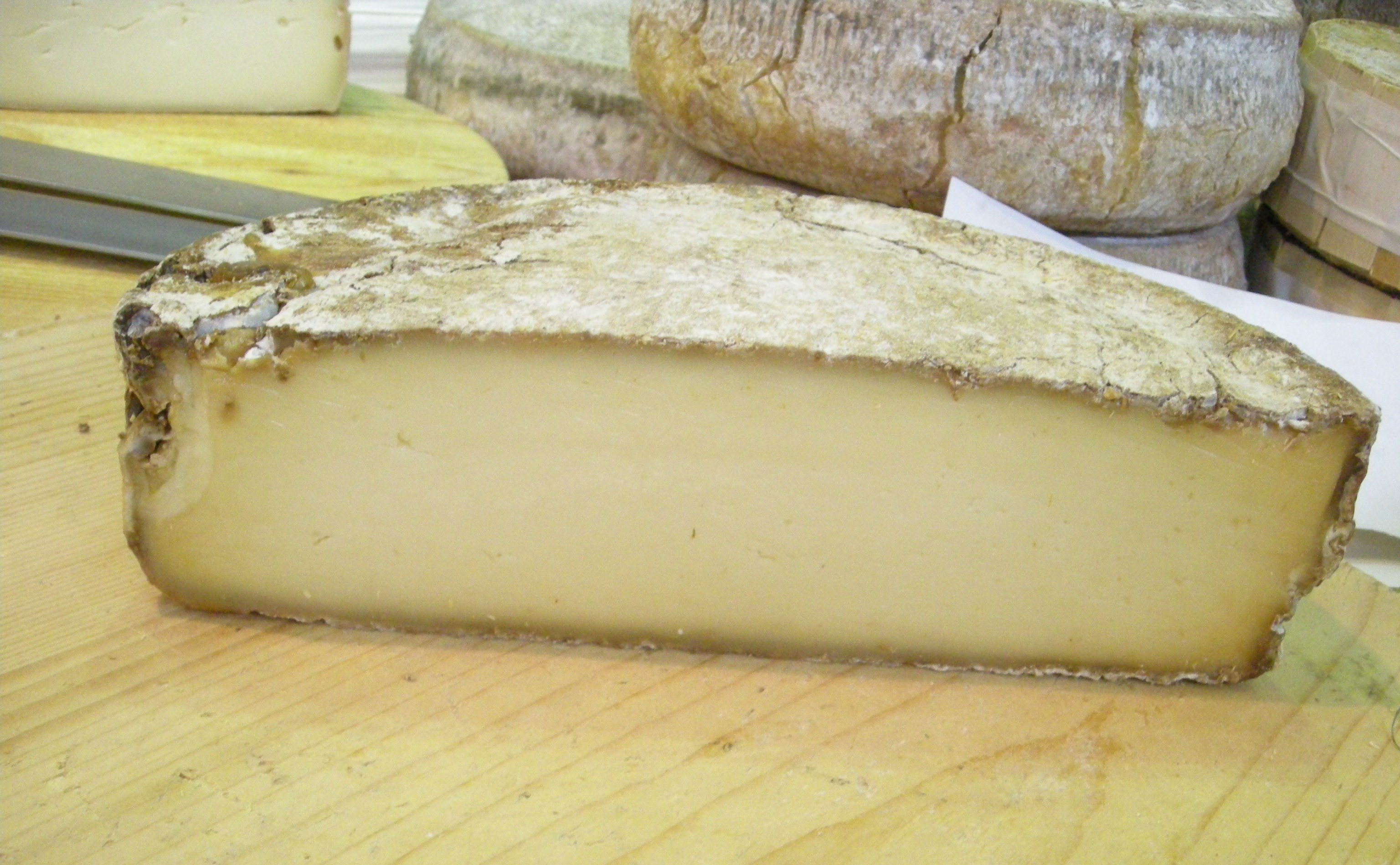
- Other names: Morlacco del Grappa, Morlacco del Montegrappa, Morlacco del Grappa di malga
- Country of origin: Italy
- Region: Veneto
- Source of milk: Cow's milk

Morlacco (Venetian: Morlac) or Morlacco del Grappa is an Italian cow's-milk cheese from Monte Grappa, in the provinces of Vicenza, Treviso, and Belluno), where cheesemakers once produced a soft cow's milk cheese, low in fat, with an uncooked curd that was named after their native region: Morlachia.

The local Burlina cows—a breed at risk of extinction—produced the milk used for this cheese. The Burlina cow is small and hardy and has a piebald black and white coat.

After 20 days of aging, the cheese is ready for consumption, but it can be left to age for up to three months.

== See also ==
- List of Italian cheeses
