= Saint-Nicolas, Aosta Valley =

Saint-Nicolas Sen-Nicolà (Valdôtain)
- Comune
- Comune di Saint-Nicolas; Commune de Saint-Nicolas
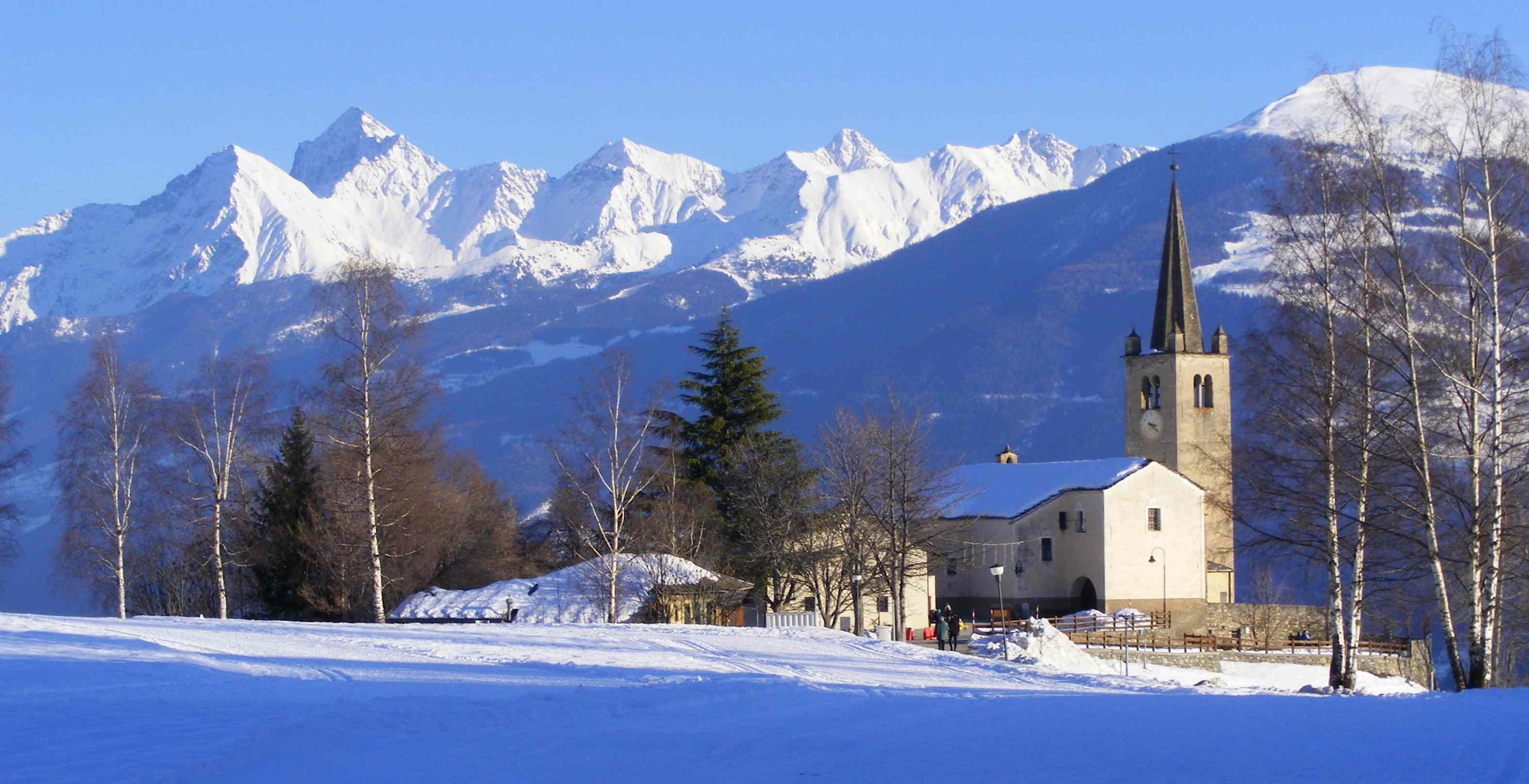
- The parish church (La Cure).

- Coat of arms

- Location within Italy Location within Aosta Valley
- Coordinates: 45°43′N 7°10′E
- Country: Italy
- Region: Aosta Valley
- Province: none
- Frazioni: Cerlogne, Chez-Louitoz, Clavel, Évian, Fossaz-Dessous, Fossaz-Dessus, La Cure, Chaillod, Ravoise, Persod, Petit-Sarriod, Grand-Sarriod, Gerbore, Ferrère, Gratillon, Lyveroulaz, Vens

Area
  - Total: 15 km^{2} (5.8 sq mi)

Population (31 December 2022)
  - Total: 327
  - Density: 22/km^{2} (56/sq mi)
- Time zone: UTC+1 (CET)
  - Summer (DST): UTC+2 (CEST)
- Postal code: 11010
- Dialing code: 0165
- Patron saint: Saint Nicholas
- Saint day: 7 April
- Website: Official website

Saint-Nicolas (French: [sɛ̃ nikɔla]; Valdôtain: Sen-Nicolà) is a town and comune in the autonomous region of Aosta Valley, in northern Italy. It is located between 950 and 1,550 metres (3,120 and 5,090 ft) above sea level, overlooking the four major lateral valleys of the mid-upper Aosta valley: the Cogne Valley, the Valsavarenche, the Rhêmes Valley and the Valgrisenche.

== Sites ==
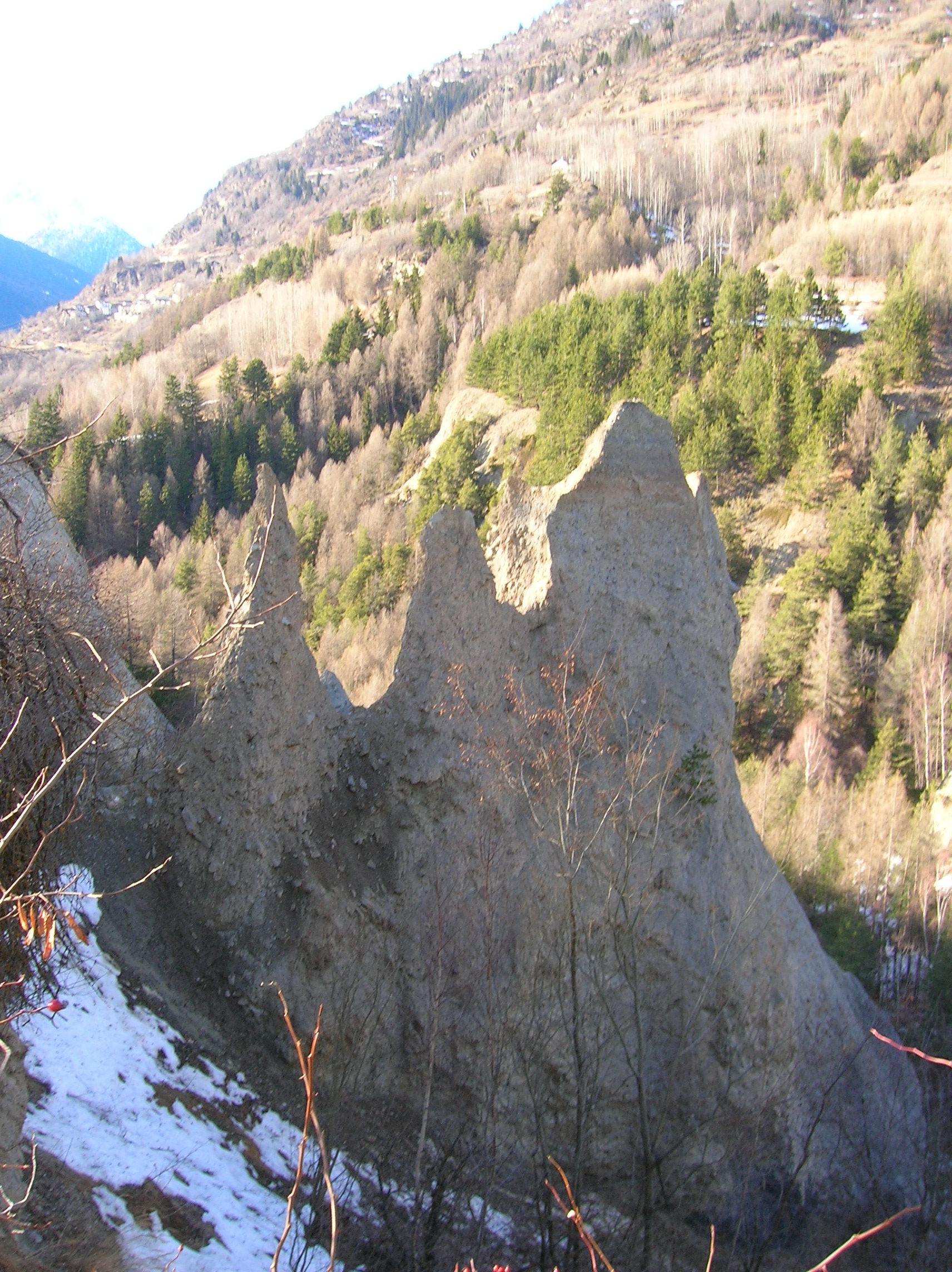
The "earth pyramids"

Saint-Nicolas consists of a small village and numerous hamlets or frazioni, locally officially called hameaux (in French).

== Culture ==
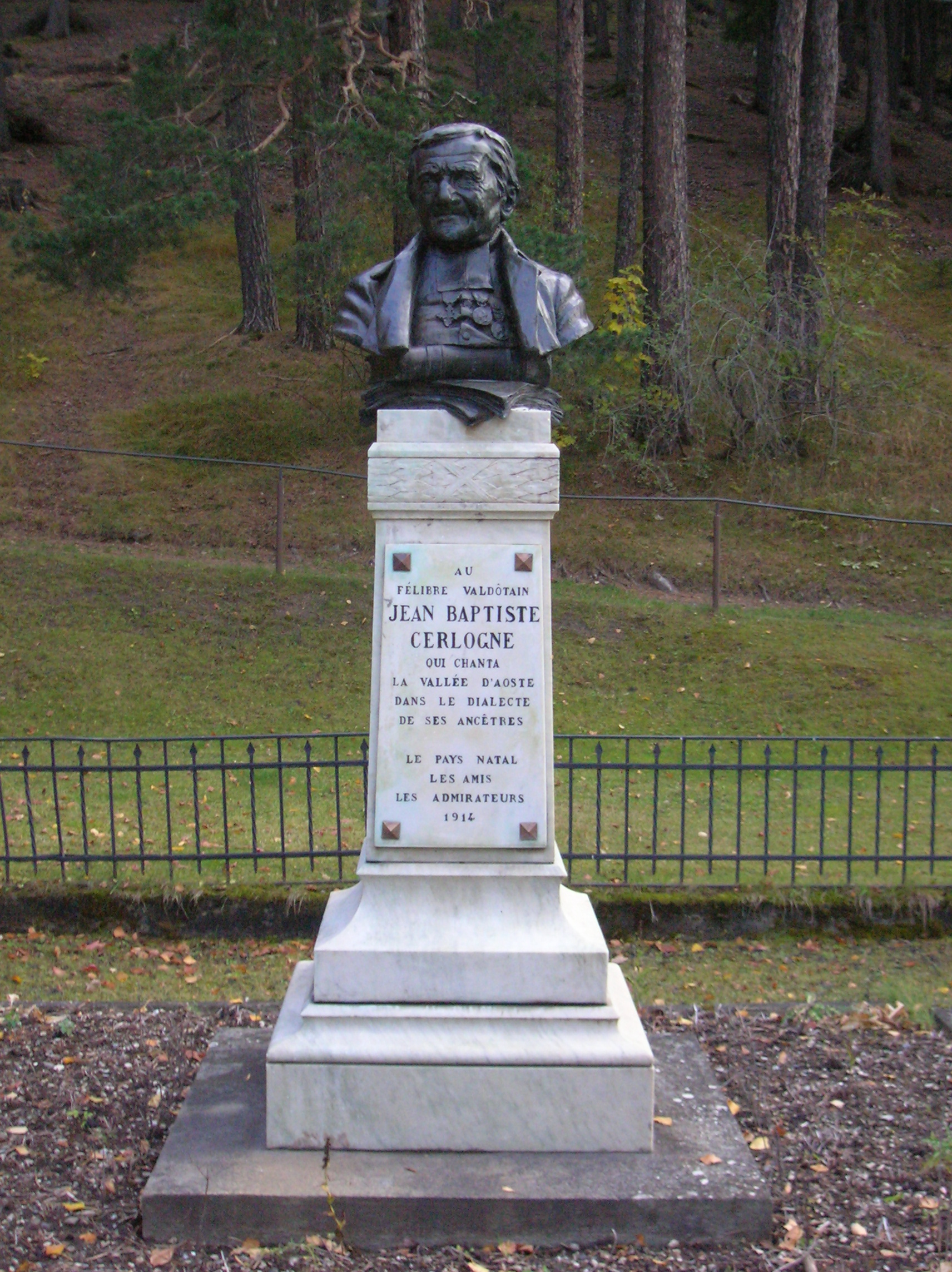
Monument to Jean-Baptiste Cerlogne

=== Jean-Baptiste Cerlogne ===
Saint-Nicolas was the birthplace of Jean-Baptiste Cerlogne, a abbot who firstly studied Aosta Valley's native language, the Valdôtain dialect. He authored some poems in his native patois and wrote the first grammar and dictionary of the Valdôtain dialect.

=== Center for Francoprovençal Studies ===
The Center for Francoprovençal Studies (French: Centre d'études francoprovençales), or CEFP, located in the village of Fossaz-dessus, is one of the most important centers for Francoprovençal language research. It opened November 12, 1988 and was dedicated to the Aosta Valley writer and playwright René Willien. The CEFP is located in an 18th-century maison paysanne (farmhouse) which was completely restored by architects Louis Bochet and Albert Breuvé. Typical of these multi-function structures, locally called a pailler, the animals, hay, and farm implements filled the barn (booué) on the ground floor, the family kitchen (meison) occupied first floor, and the sleeping room (tsambra) was located on the second floor. Among the center's holdings is the archive of the "Concours Cerlogne," a poetry, drama and music competition in the regional language reserved for elementary school students in the Aosta Valley that has been held annually since 1963.

The CEFP works in collaboration with the Regional Bureau of Ethnology and Linguistics (French: Bureau régional pour l'ethnologie et la linguistique) (BREL) of Aosta, and other research centers in France and Romandy.

=== Gerbore Museum ===
This museum, situated in the village of Lyverloulaz, demonstrates the impact of agricultural mechanization in Aosta Valley through the experiences of Joseph Gerbore. Founded by the municipality of Saint-Nicolas, the Aosta Valley Region, and the European Union, it hosts exhibitions, including Le temps des pionniers, at the Maison de la Tor building.
