= Bataille de Reines =

Annual cow fighting tournament in the Aosta Valley

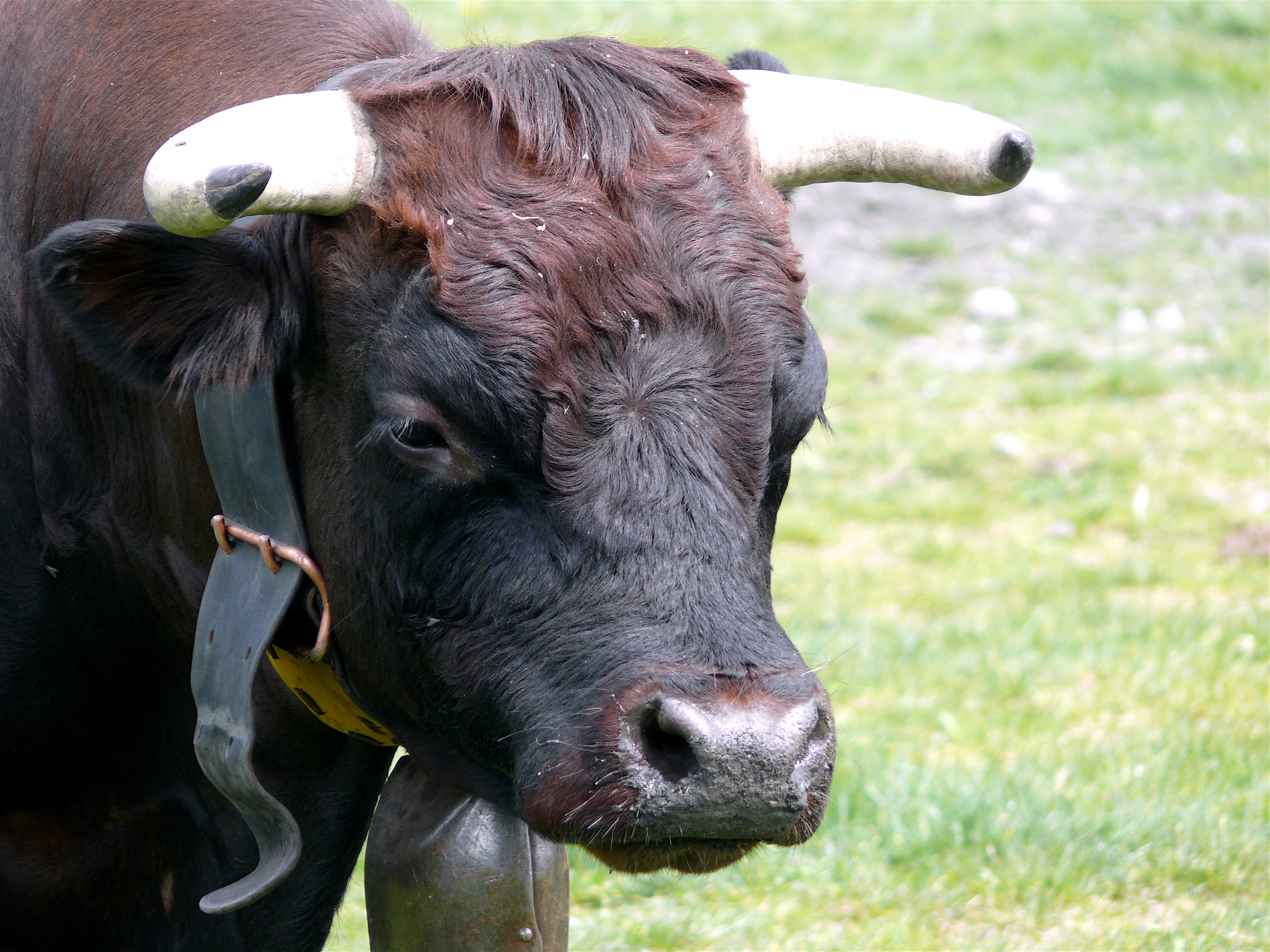
An Aostan black-brown ("pie noire") cow in battle.

The Battle of the Queens (in Aostan French, La bataille de reines; in Valdôtain dialect, La bataille de vatse) is an annual cow fighting tournament that takes place in the Aosta Valley.

Cows compete for the title of Reina di corne (Valdôtain for Queen of horns).

== History ==
The tournament is known to date back (at least) to 1858, which is when Jean-Baptiste Cerlogne wrote about it. Since 1958 it has been co-funded by the district council (French: Conseil de la Vallée).

== Breeds ==
The favoured breed of cow for the batailles is the Aosta Black Pied. Alpine cows such as these are believed to be relatively assertive, and less likely to refuse to fight than cows accustomed to the soft life in the flat lands.

== Description ==
The event is conceptually similar to cow fighting contests held in the context of summer folk festivals in several of the Swiss valleys. The cows naturally fight in order to determine the hierarchy within the herd: provided the animals' horns have been properly trimmed little lasting damage ensues. Two cows push each other until one falls over or otherwise withdraws. The cow left standing is the winner.

== Tournaments ==
Aosta Valley's Battle of the Queens is more than a single event, however. The overall contest takes the form of a series of elimination heats.

Elimination heats take place in various locations in the Aosta Valley during the spring, summer and autumn. Traditionally the first contest of the season takes place at Combe de Vertosan, a small high valley located between La Salle and Avise, near Mont Blanc. In order to avoid injustice and maximise participation, the cows are weighed, using up to date electronic scales, on the morning of the contest, and then separated into three categories according to weight as follows:

- Category 1 (heavyweight) above 571 kg
- Category 2 (middleweight) 521 kg - 570 kg
- Category 3 (lightweight) up to 520 kg

Cow weights are not consistent through the year, and for the final three contest of the autumn (fall) the weight band thresholds are increased by 10 or 20 kg.

== Combat final ==
The finals, called in French Combat final, traditionally took place on a Sunday in October at the Puchoz Stadium in Aosta. Today they take place in the newer Croix-Noire Arena which is located on the recently developed eastern edge (French: Zone commerciale) of Aosta, near Saint-Christophe.

== See also ==
- Combat de Reines
