= Jean-Baptiste Cerlogne =

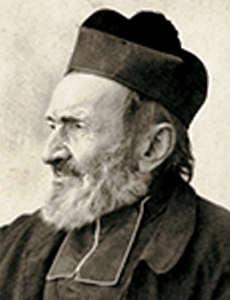
- Jean-Baptiste Cerlogne in c. 1900
- Born: 6 March 1826; Saint-Nicolas, Aosta Valley
- Died: 7 October 1910 (aged 84); Saint-Nicolas, Aosta Valley, Italy
- Occupations: Priest, poet, Valdôtain scholar
- Parent: Jean-Michel Cerlogne

Jean-Baptiste Cerlogne (6 March 1826 – 7 October 1910) was a poet-priest and scholar of the Valdôtain dialect of Franco-Provençal. He is celebrated as a pioneer of Franco-Provençal grammar and lexicography, identifying a vocabulary for a set of dialects that had hitherto very largely been transmitted only orally. He is also considered the principal poet of the Aosta Valley, where he lived for most of his life, being a Savoyard in his youth before becoming an Italian.

== Life ==
Cerlogne was born in the hamlet with which he shared his surname, in the comune of Saint-Nicolas, a mountain village several kilometers west of Aosta. His father, Jean-Michel Cerlogne, was a veteran of the Napoleonic Wars who worked as the village school master. While still a child, Cerlogne had to leave the family home to support himself as a shepherd. This was normal for boys of his age, as was his moving away from home to find work, becoming a chimney sweep in Marseille. He returned briefly to the Aosta Valley in 1841, and this time when he went back to Marseille he obtained a job at the "Hôtel des Princes" where he worked as a scullion in the kitchens. A few years later, he had risen to the rank of kitchen assistant, which meant that when he next returned to his home valley, in 1845, he had a "trade". Still only 19, he now resumed his attendance at the local school for a couple of years.

On 4 January 1847 he left the valley again, this time to enlist as a soldier for King Charles Albert. He participated in the First Italian War of Independence, taking part in the battles of Goito and Santa Lucia. He was captured by the Austrians and briefly held as a prisoner of war, before being released on 7 September 1848. In his autobiography he later took care to stress the humanity with which, as a prisoner, he was treated by the Austrian army. After the Battle of Novara (23 March 1849) the war spluttered to an end, and he was sent on indefinite leave: he returned to Saint-Nicolas where, despite his age, he resumed his habit of attending the village school as a pupil, alongside the children.

It turned out that word had got out concerning his experience in the hotel kitchens in Marseille. He was effectively head-hunted to take on the catering at the principal seminary in Aosta, where he started work in September 1851. It was while working at the seminary that, encouraged by a senior seminarian, Canon Édouard Bérard, he composed his first poems (in French). Initially he continued to live at home in Saint-Nicolas, but in August 1854, following the death of the seminary superintendent, he became concerned that he might be about to lose his job, and took the opportunity to move into the seminary. After the death of his mother the following year he temporarily returned to Saint-Nicolas, but in August 1855 he was invited to return and resume his culinary duties at the seminary.

In 1855, possibly as a test, Bérard invited Cerlogne to compose a poem in the Valdôtain patois on the subject of the Prodigal Son. He duly set about writing, in two weeks, L'Infan prodeuggo; the first known poem written in the dialect. The poem was read out in the presence of the Bishop of Aosta, André Jourdain. The same year, before Christmas, Cerlogne wrote a second poem, entitled La maènda à Tsésalet ('Dinner at Chesallet'); the bishop declared that Cerlogne's abilities were wasted in the kitchen ('Ce garçon-là devrait avoir du talent pour autre chose que pour faire la cuisine. Il faut le faire étudier.') and committed to fund his further study personally.

On 16 August 1856, Cerlogne left his job in the seminary kitchen and started to study with Father Basile Guichardaz, the priest at Saint-Nicolas, even though it quickly became apparent that Cerlogne's interest in poetry did not readily extend to an interest in the Latin grammar which was a required topic. He nevertheless returned to the seminary on 15 October 1859, but now, aged 33, he entered not as the cook but as a seminarian (trainee priest).

On some of the contradictions for the Aosta Valley of Italian unification:

"All this time we used to be called Savoyards, and now we've been turned into Italians, even though the Val d'Aostans are still called – call themselves, no less, Savoyards, and thanks to their [use of the] French language, they are usually considered more as French than Piedmontese; still less as Italians. Oh! The French language we battled for so long, that is our ancestral tongue..."

"De tout temps ceux-ci se disaient Savoyards et encore aujourd'hui qu'on nous a fait Italiens, les Valdôtains sont appelés et ils s'appellent Savoyards et grâce aussi à leur langue française, sont considérés plutôt comme Français et non-comme Piémontais, et bien moins encore comme Italiens. Oh ! notre langue française à laquelle on fait depuis longtemps la guerre, c'est la langue de nos père..."

J.-B.Cerlogne – Vie du petit ramoneur – Imp. Cerlogne – Pessinetto – 1895

In 1861, he composed the best known of his Valdôtain poems, 'La Pastorala', published in 1884, and still the Christmas song of choice in the Aosta Valley. In 1862, he also produced a French version, 'La Pastorale'.

Soon after becoming a seminarian, he became aware of his vocation and, after some years of preparation, he became a country priest. Cerlogne celebrated his first mass at Saint-Nicolas on 22 December 1864. This was the start of a new life, during which he served in a succession of parishes. On 1 February 1865, he was appointed deacon at Valgrisenche, where he would recall wryly that the holy water in the church remained frozen for five months, and where he translated the papal bull "Ineffabilis Deus" (on the Immaculate Conception) into patois. Towards the end of September 1866, he was transferred to Pontboset, where he was awarded a medal of civil merit in recognition of the help he gave the people during the cholera epidemic of 1867. In a single month, he delivered help to 150 sick parishioners and buried 63 dead ones. The next year he composed the 'hymn', 'Les petits chinois' ('The Little Chinamen'), to be set to the melody of a regionally well-known folk tune.

On 19 November 1870 he was given charge of his own parish, sent to take on Champdepraz, a small agricultural mountain parish in the eastern part of the Aosta Valley region. He now sought to clear the plot he had purchased to try his hand at viticulture. Neighbours subsequently followed his example, as a result of which, during the closing decades of the nineteenth century, vineyards came to dominate the hills of the comune.

In October 1879, by now somewhat fatigued by nine years of parish responsibilities and viticulture, Cerlogne an invitation to live in the priory-rectory at Ayas. For the next four years he was able to use "the solitude of his room for scholarship". He used the opportunity to prepare material for his Dictionary and Grammar Book of the Valdôtain patois. In 1883 he returned to his parish at Champdepraz, where during the next few years he returned to poetry, producing "Lo Tsemin de Fer" ("The Railway" 1886), "Le s-ou et le dove comére" ("The Eggs and the Two Gossips"), "A do dzovenno epaou" ("To a Young Couple") and "la Pastorala di Rèi" (Pastorale of the Three Kings 1888).

In 1889 he took on another parish, at Gressoney-Saint-Jean, and in 1891 he moved again, this time to the parish at Barbania, in the region of Piedmont (and therefore just outside the Aosta Valley), where the winters were less severe. Here he published two volume of a "village almanac" ("L'Armanaque di Velladzo"), which in its 1893 edition included his "Tsanson de Carnaval" ("Carnival Song"). It was also on 1893 that he published his "Petite grammaire du dialecte valdôtain", the work on Valdôtain grammar which had occupied him for many years. He was transferred again on 30 October 1894, this time to the parish of Pessinetto, where in January 1896 he published a new version of his "Tsanson de Carnaval" ("Carnival Song"), inspired as before – but more obviously – by social injustice and the gulf between rich and poor. The antepenultimate stanza also touches on the theme of economic emigration in search of work, a long running theme in much of Italy during the nineteenth and twentieth centuries.

In July 1896 he was moved to Cantoira for eight months before moving on again to Corio, where in 1898 he wrote " Cinquantiémo anniverséro de 48", celebrating the fiftieth anniversary of 1848. On 12 March 1899 he arrived back in Champdepraz in the Aosta Valley. Although he expressed his joy at being back in the land of his birth, one more posting in Piedmont ensued, when he was transferred on 26 August 1899 to Canale d’Alba, where he remained till 12 May 1901 (or 1900). After this he was able to live out his years in the Aosta Valley, taking charge at the parish of Vieyes, a hamlet at Aymavilles in the western part of the Aosta Valley where he composed several poems to celebrate the inauguration on 22 July 1901 at Courmayeur of the "Abbé Henry" Botanical Garden.

On 10 September 1902 the king appointed him a knight of the Order of Saints Maurice and Lazarus. The award was not unexpected. Cerlogne's writings had long reflected a deep respect for the kings of Italy, to whom several of his works had been dedicated, such as his 1890 poem "To her Majesty, the Queen of Italy" ("À Sa Majesté la Reine d'Italie"), dedicated to Queen Margherita, for which he revisited his memories from his time serving in the army of King Charles Albert during the First Italian War of Independence.

He was back in Piedmont in 1903, this time as a patient at the Ophthalmic Hospital in Turin for the removal of cataracts – a more protracted operation then than subsequently. The operation was a success and he was directed by the doctor responsible to wear glasses to protect his vision for the future. He did this, but not for very long, and his vision deteriorated again. Commenting on his resulting predicament Cerlogne later commented that his friend, the Abbé Henry, "loaned him his eyes" for the publication (in 1907) of his Valdôtain dictionary.

Later that year, on 30 November 1903, he moved into the Saint-Jacquême priory, a retirement home in Saint-Pierre for Val d'Aostan priests. He continued to work, authoring "Le patois valdôtain" which included "La fenna consolaye", a song which, according to Cerlogne, the oldest people in the local villages had already learned long ago from their grandmothers. On 6 March 1908 he quit the priory and went to live at the home of the poet Marius Thomasset at Villeneuve, working almost to the end on the linguistic development of the Valdôtain patois. Towards the end he moved on again, now to the presbytery at Saint-Nicolas. Here, on 7 October 1910, he died.

== Heritage ==
Each year an event called "Concours Cerlogne", during which all Aostan primary schools, together with other schools coming from all over Franco-provençal area, gather and participate with theatre plays or songs in patois, is organized in a different municipality of the Aosta Valley.
