= Varzese-Ottonese-Tortonese =

Breed of cattle

- Other names: Varzese; Varzese-Ottonese
- Country of origin: Italy: Lombardy
- Use: Dual-purpose: milk and beef

Traits
- Coat: Uniform pale wheaten
- Horn status: Horned

The Varzese-Ottonese-Tortonese is a breed of cattle from the Italian region of Lombardy and neighbouring mountainous areas in Emilia Romagna, Liguria and Piedmont. It is one of the sixteen minor Italian cattle breeds of limited diffusion recognised and protected by the Ministero delle Politiche Agricole Alimentari e Forestali, the Italian ministry of agriculture.
