= Mucca Pisana =

Breed of cattle

- Other names: Mucco Pisano, Pisana
- Country of origin: Italy: Tuscany
- Use: Predominantly for beef

Traits
- Coat: Pale to dark chestnut, red dorsal stripe
- Horn status: Horned

The Mucca Pisana is a breed of cattle from Tuscany, in central Italy. It is one of the 16 minor Italian cattle breeds of limited diffusion recognised and protected by the Ministero delle Politiche Agricole Alimentari e Forestali, the Italian ministry of agriculture.
