= Burlina =

Italian breed of cattle

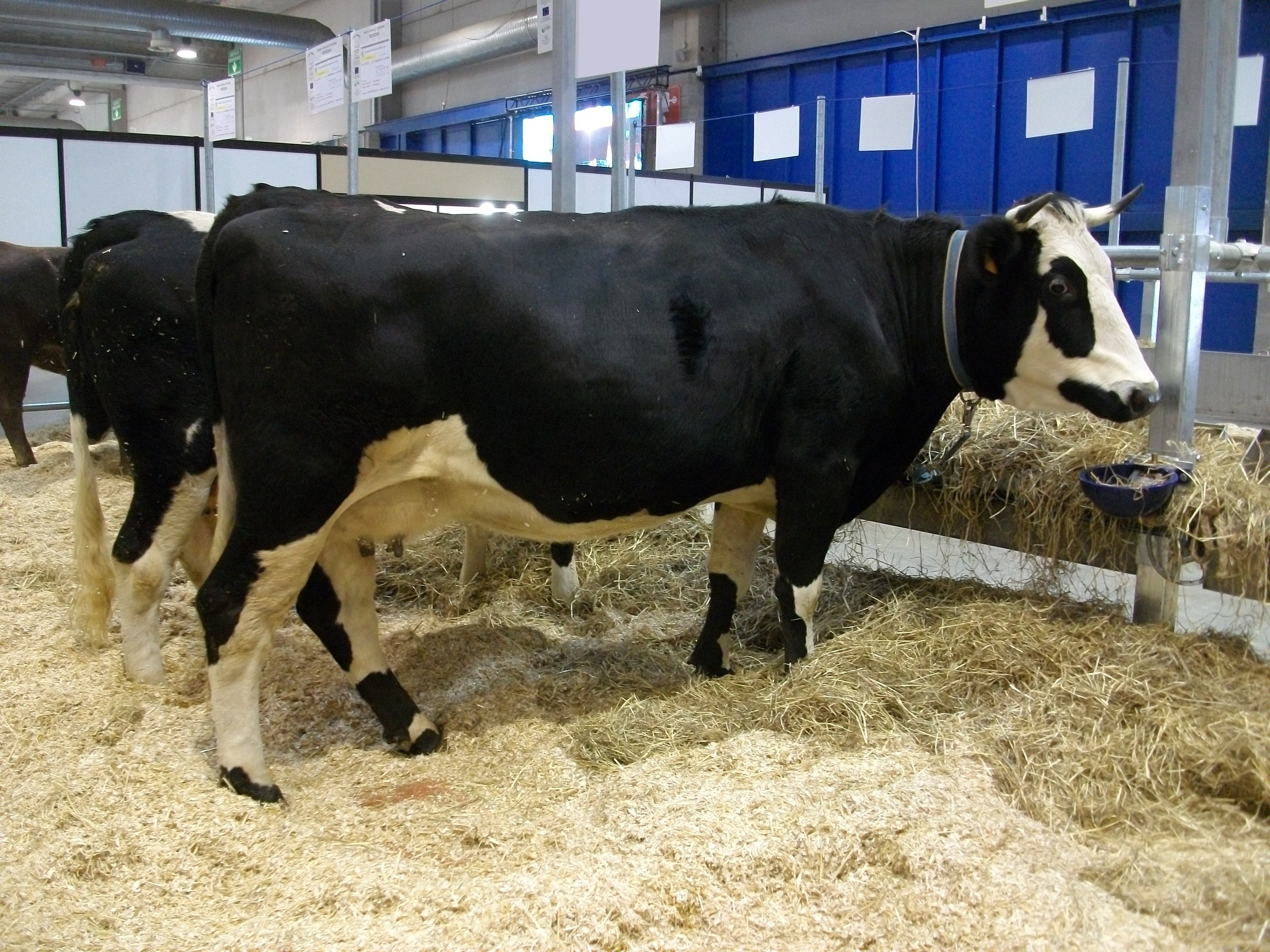
- Conservation status: FAO (2007): critical-maintained; DAD-IS (2026): at risk/endangered-maintained
- Other names: Bassanese; Binda; Boccarda; Pezzata degli altipiani
- Country of origin: Italy
- Distribution: Province of Treviso; Province of Verona; Province of Vicenza
- Standard: MIPAAF (page 4)
- Use: mainly dairy

Traits
- Weight: Male: average 450 kg; Female: average 400 kg
- Height: Male: average 125 cm; Female: average 120 cm
- Coat: pied black-and-white
- Horn status: horned
- Cattle; Bos (primigenius) taurus

The Burlina is an Italian breed of cattle from the mountainous areas of the Veneto region of north-east Italy. It is distributed mainly in the provinces of Treviso, Verona and Vicenza. It is a dual-purpose breed, but is raised principally for milk production. It has been suggested that it may be related to the similar Bretonne Pie Noir breed of small pied dairy cattle in Brittany.

== History ==
The origins of the Burlina are unknown. It has been suggested that it may be related to the Bretonne Pie Noir, a breed of small pied dairy cattle in Brittany, or that it may have been brought into Italy by Cimbrian migrants.

The Burlina was one of the most numerous breeds present in north-eastern Italy in the early twentieth century, numbering tens of thousands of head. Until the 1930s, it was the commonest dairy breed on the Altopiano di Asiago, in the Colli Berici, on Monte Grappa and in the Monti Lessini. Numbers declined significantly during the First World War, under the Fascist regime and during the Second World War, and gradually during the 1950s and 1960s. It was mostly replaced by the Friesian, which was deemed more productive. In 1956 the population in the Veneto was recorded as 11283; by 2008 it had fallen to about 300.

== Characteristics ==
The Burlina is small, with a pied black-and-white coat. It is well adapted to grazing on poor or marginal mountain pasture, and is hardy, rugged and resistant to disease.

== Use ==
The Burlina cow has a milk yield comparable to that of other Italian Alpine breeds, and about half that of the Frisona Italiana or Italian Friesian. It is longer-lived and more fertile, and – because of its smaller size – requires less food; it is able to exploit poor and fragile mountain pastures.

The milk is similar in proportions of protein and fat to that of the Friesian, but is higher in κ-casein and so more suitable for cheese-making. The milk is traditionally used in the production of the regional Morlacco del Grappa cheese. Both the cheese and the cattle are listed by the international Slow Food Foundation, the cattle in the Ark of Taste and the cheese as a Slow Food Praesidium.

The traditional management system is transhumant – the cattle range freely on high alpine pasture during the summer and are brought down to pass the winter in byres where they are fed mostly on hay, with a minimum of concentrated feed.
