= Fribourgeoise =

Extinct Swiss breed of cattle

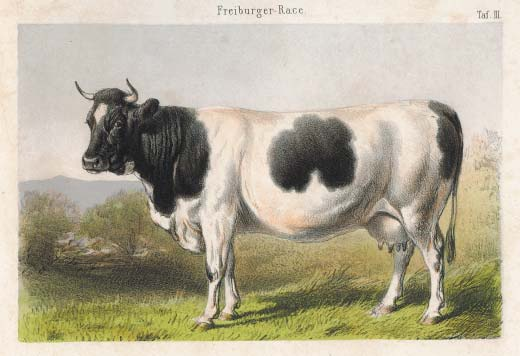
- Fribourgeoise cow in an engraving from 1859
- Conservation status: extinct
- Other names: Fribourgeois; Freiburger; Schwarzfleckvieh; Freiburger Schwarzfleckvieh
- Country of origin: Switzerland
- Distribution: formerly: Canton of Fribourg
- Use: dual-purpose: milk and beef

Traits
- Coat: black-pied
- Cattle; Bos (primigenius) taurus

The Fribourgeoise or Freiburger was a Swiss breed of cattle from the Canton of Fribourg in western Switzerland. From about 1966 it was systematically cross-bred with imported Holstein stock. It became effectively extinct with the death of the last pure-bred bull in 1973, and was absorbed into the Swiss Holstein.

== History ==
The Fribourgeoise was a traditional Swiss breed of cattle from the Canton of Fribourg in western Switzerland. A Fribourgeois bull took first prize at the second Concours agricole universel in Paris in 1856. A breeders' society was formed in 1890, and a herd-book was started in 1898 or 1899. In 1903 a bull named Garibaldi was sent to be exhibited in Milan, but was refused entry because it was named for the hero of the Unification of Italy; only after the name had been changed was it allowed to enter the country.

In the 1940s the Fribourgeoise was distributed mainly in the canton of Fribourg, with some in the cantons of Neuchâtel and Bâle. In the 1950s two bulls of the German Schwarzbunte Niederungsrind breed were imported, and in the 1960s there was some illegal importation of stock from both France and Germany. The name of the breed was changed to Schwarzfleckvieh.

In 1966 the restrictive regulations on artificial insemination were lifted, and frozen Holstein semen from Canada began to be imported in quantity. In 1973, some 29 000 doses were used. In the same year, the last remaining pure-bred Fribourgeois bull died, and the breed became effectively extinct. The modern Swiss Holstein is considered to be partly descended from it; it may also have influenced the development of the Italian Valdostana Pezzata Nera breed.

== Characteristics and use ==
The Fribourgeoise was a large black-pied breed of dual-purpose cattle, kept for both milk and meat.
