= Pontremolese =

Breed of cattle

- Country of origin: Italy: Tuscany
- Use: Mainly for beef

Traits
- Coat: Red, black round the eyes, slate-grey skin
- Horn status: Horned

The Pontremolese is a cattle breed from Tuscany in central Italy. It is one of the sixteen minor Italian cattle breeds of limited diffusion recognised and protected by the Ministero delle Politiche Agricole Alimentari e Forestali, the Italian ministry of agriculture.
