= Sarda cattle =

Breed of cattle

Sarda
- Country of origin: Italy: Sardinia
- Use: Beef

Traits
- Coat: Variable; dorsal stripe
- Horn status: Horned

The Sarda is a breed of small beef cattle from the Italian island of Sardinia. It is one of the sixteen minor Italian cattle breeds of limited diffusion recognised and protected by the Ministero delle Politiche Agricole Alimentari e Forestali, the Italian ministry of agriculture.
