= Pezzata Rossa d'Oropa =

Breed of cattle

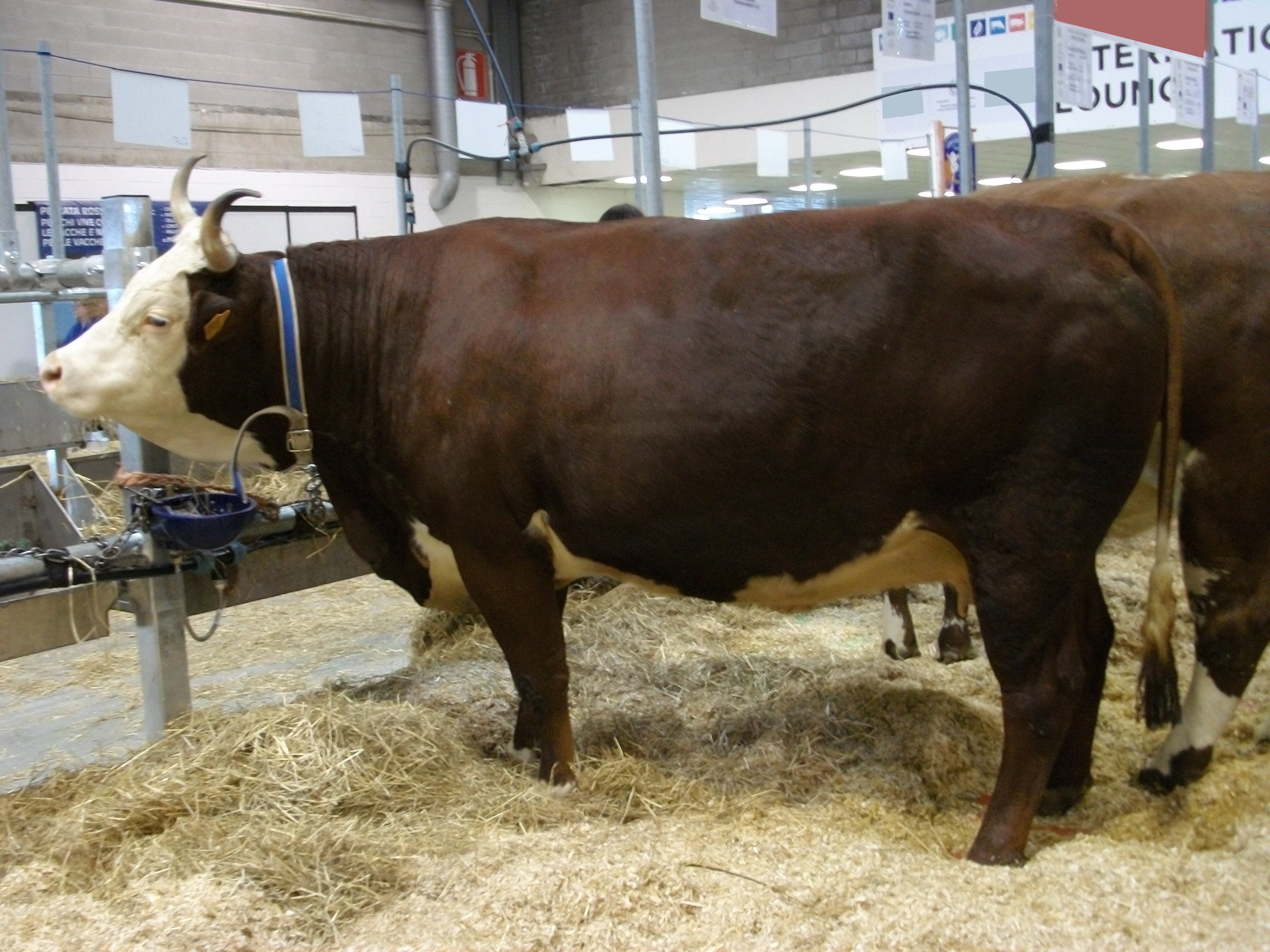
- Country of origin: Italy: Piedmont: provinces of Vercelli and Biella
- Use: Dual-purpose: milk and beef

Traits
- Coat: Pied red
- Horn status: Horned

The Pezzata Rossa d'Oropa is a cattle breed from the provinces of Vercelli and Biella in the Piedmont region of Italy. It is one of the 16 minor Italian cattle breeds of limited diffusion recognised and protected by the Ministero delle Politiche Agricole Alimentari e Forestali, the Italian ministry of agriculture.
