= Évolène cattle =

Breed of cattle

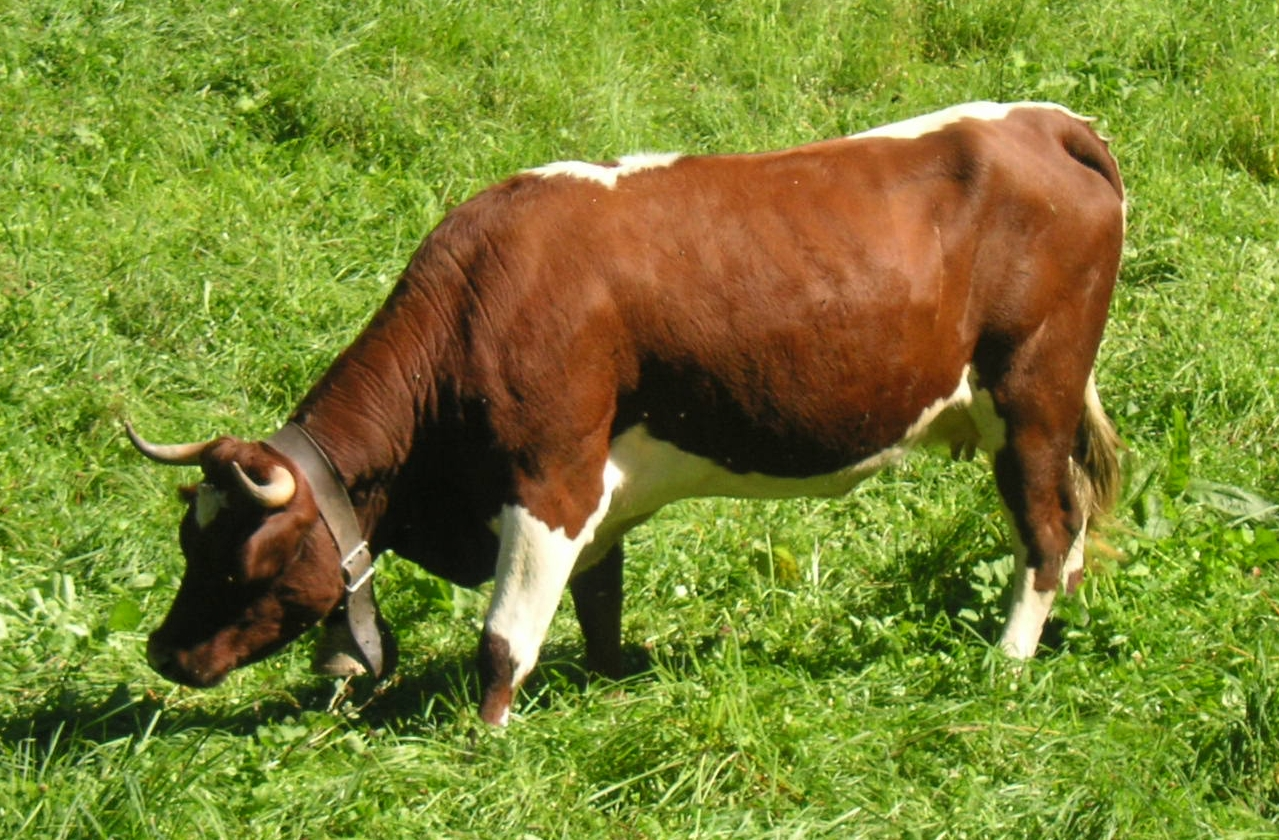
A grazing Évolène cow at Ballenberg, Switzerland.

Évolène cattle are an endangered breed from the canton of Valais in Switzerland. They are a traditional dual-purpose breed, valued for both milk and meat production, and are well adapted to mountainous terrain and Alpine climates. Conservation efforts since the late 20th century have aimed to protect the breed’s genetic diversity and climate resilience.

== Characteristics ==
Évolène cattle are medium-sized animals with a predominantly pied red coat, although pied black individuals also occur. Both males and females are horned. The breed is muscular, with cows displaying particularly well-defined neck muscles.

On average, Évolènes produce about 3,200 kilograms of milk annually, making them suitable for dairy use. Their strong build and efficient slaughter yield also make them viable for beef production. Bulls typically reach a height of approximately 130 cm and weigh between 600 and 700 kilograms. Cows are smaller, standing between 115 and 125 cm tall and weighing 400 to 500 kilograms.

The breed is known for its aggressive temperament, with cows often engaging in prolonged fights to establish social hierarchy.

== History ==
In 2015, Swissinfo reported that the Évolène breed had been brought back from near extinction after breeding priorities in the late 19th century shifted in favor of uniform brown cattle in canton Valais. As a result, the pied Évolène population declined while the closely related Eringer breed gained popularity. The Swiss foundation ProSpecieRara helped to preserve the Évolène by establishing breeders' associations and herd books to maintain genetic diversity and avoid inbreeding. By 2015, the number of Évolène cattle in Switzerland was estimated at 400 to 450. That same year, a research project chaired by the Swiss Federal Institute of Technology in Lausanne (EPFL) identified the Évolène as an example of an ancient Swiss breed better adapted to the environmental stresses of climate change.

== Climate adaptation ==
In the context of a changing climate, researchers at the EPFL highlighted the value of traditional breeds like the Évolène for their resilience to environmental stress. The Évolène is a hardy breed and can manage on relatively little feed in Alpine conditions. Compared to larger breeds kept for higher production, Évolènes need less feed and are reported to be more resistant to illness.
