= Hinterwald =

Breed of cattle

Hinterwälder Rind (Hinterwald)
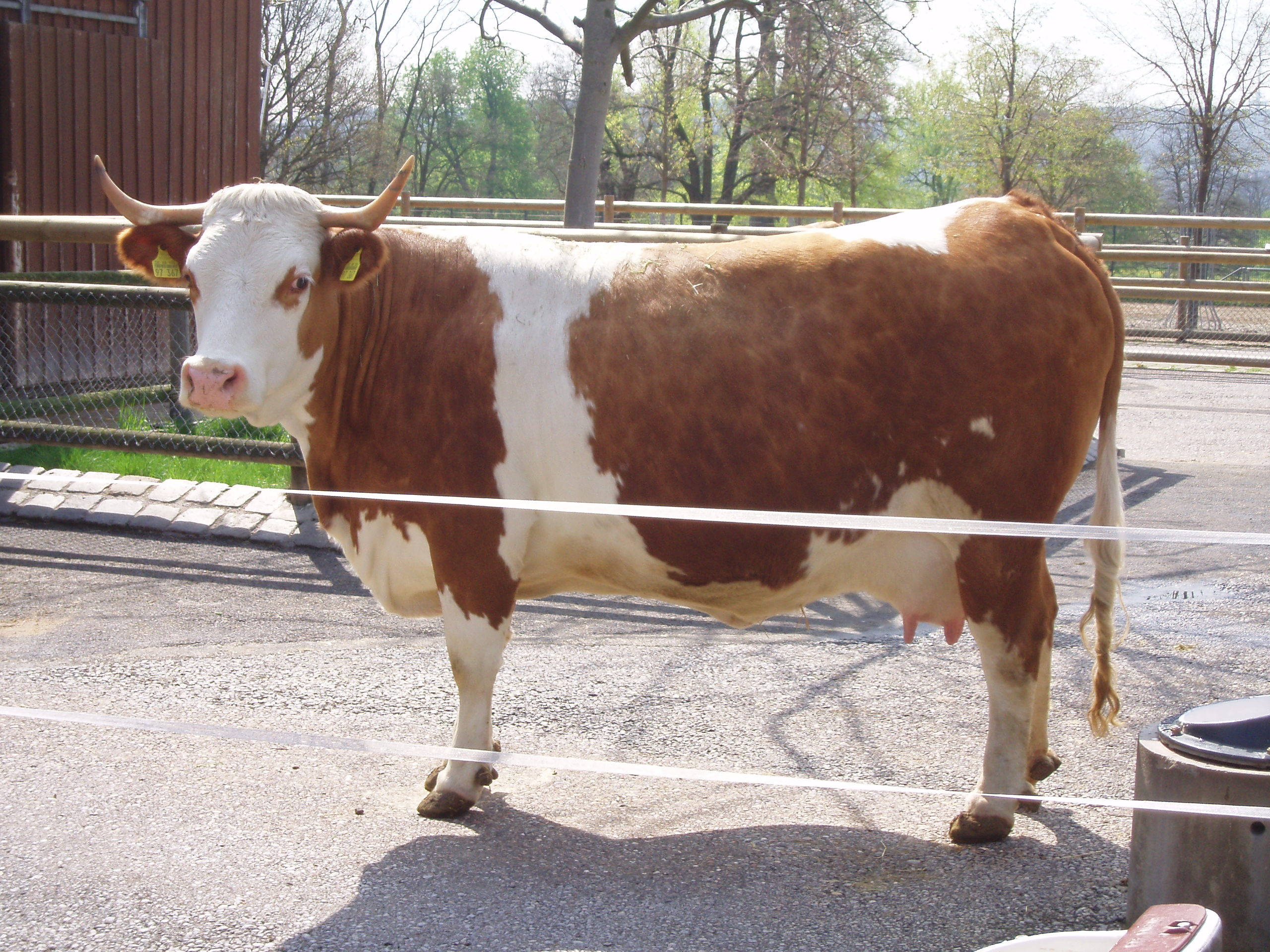
- Country of origin: Black Forest (Germany)

Traits
- Weight: Male: 750 kg; Female: 350-450 kg
- Height: Male: 130 cm; Female: 115-122 cm
- Horn status: often a conspicuous, outwardly curved horn pattern

The Hinterwald (German: Hinterwälder Rind, pronounced [ˈhɪntɐˌvɛldɐ ˈʁɪnt]) is an old local breed of cattle from the Black Forest (Germany). There are breed associations in Germany and one in Switzerland.

== Etymology ==
The Hinterwälder (literally "from the backwoods") adopted its name about 150 years ago, when they were distinguished from their somewhat larger sister breed, the Vorderwälder (literally "from the frontwoods").

The scientific name is Bos primigenius f. taurus.

== Characteristics ==
The cattle is small. Hinterwald cows are 115 to 125 centimetres (45 to 49 in) tall and weigh 350 to 450 kilograms (770 to 990 lb), while Hinterwald bulls are 130 to 135 centimetres (51 to 53 in) tall and weigh 700 to 800 kilograms (1,500 to 1,800 lb), making them the smallest breed of cattle still extant in Central Europe. The head is mostly white, the remainder of the coat being pied light yellow to dark red-brown. Having been bred to cope with extreme conditions, such as cold winters, steep pastures and a frugal diet, they are well adapted to the Alpine climate. They are used for both beef and milk production and are noted for their thriftiness, longevity and lack of calving difficulties.

These qualities have led to a significant rise in the number of Hinterwald cows in the Swiss Alps since the introduction of a breeding programme initiated by ProSpecieRara, a non-profit organisation dedicated to the preservation of endangered domestic species. However, the breed is still endangered. The government of Baden-Württemberg pays husbandry bonuses to conserve it.

The breed was "Domestic Animal of the Year" (Haustier des Jahres) in Germany in 1992.

== Photo gallery ==
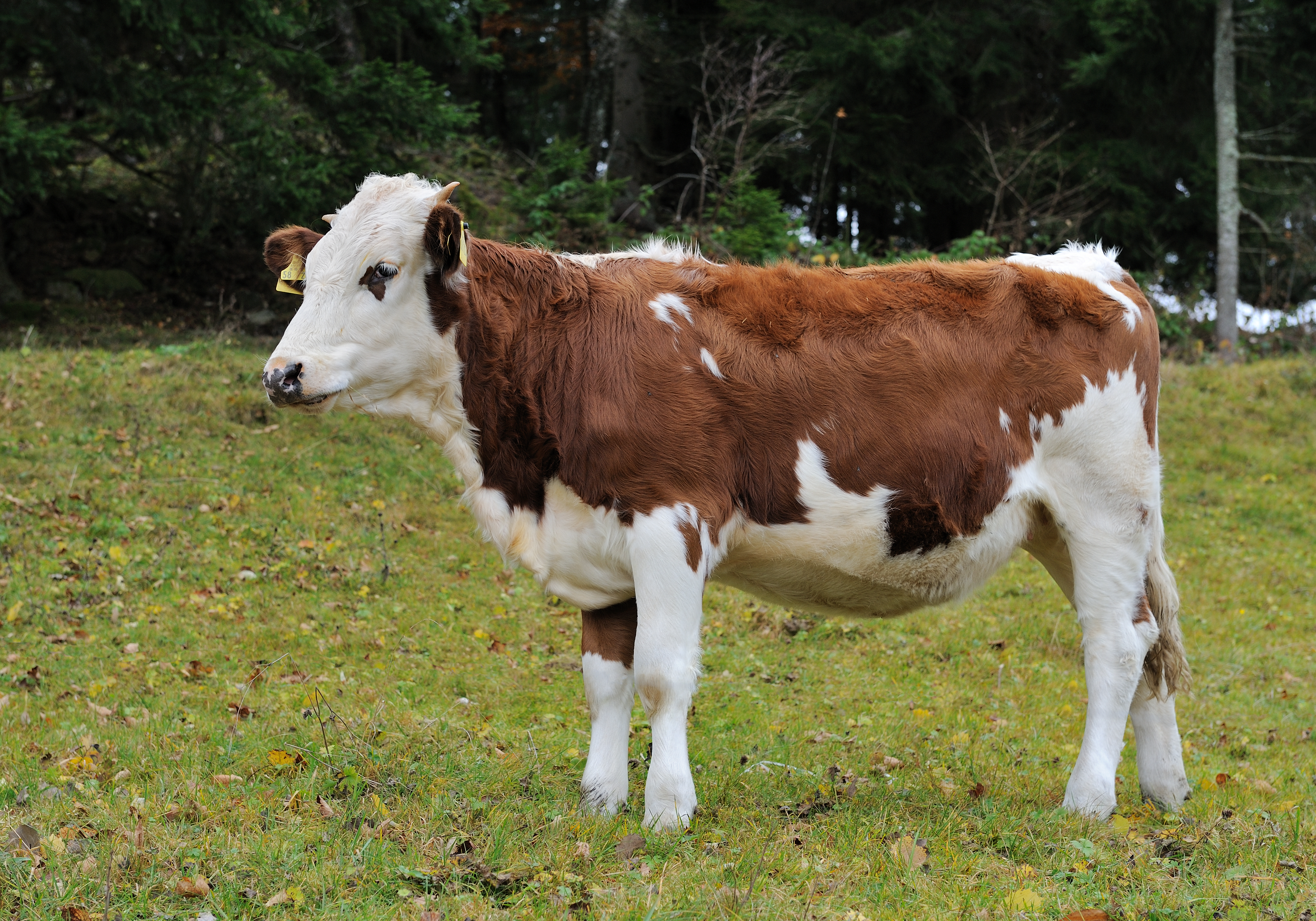
Hinterwald heifer at Hinterzarten

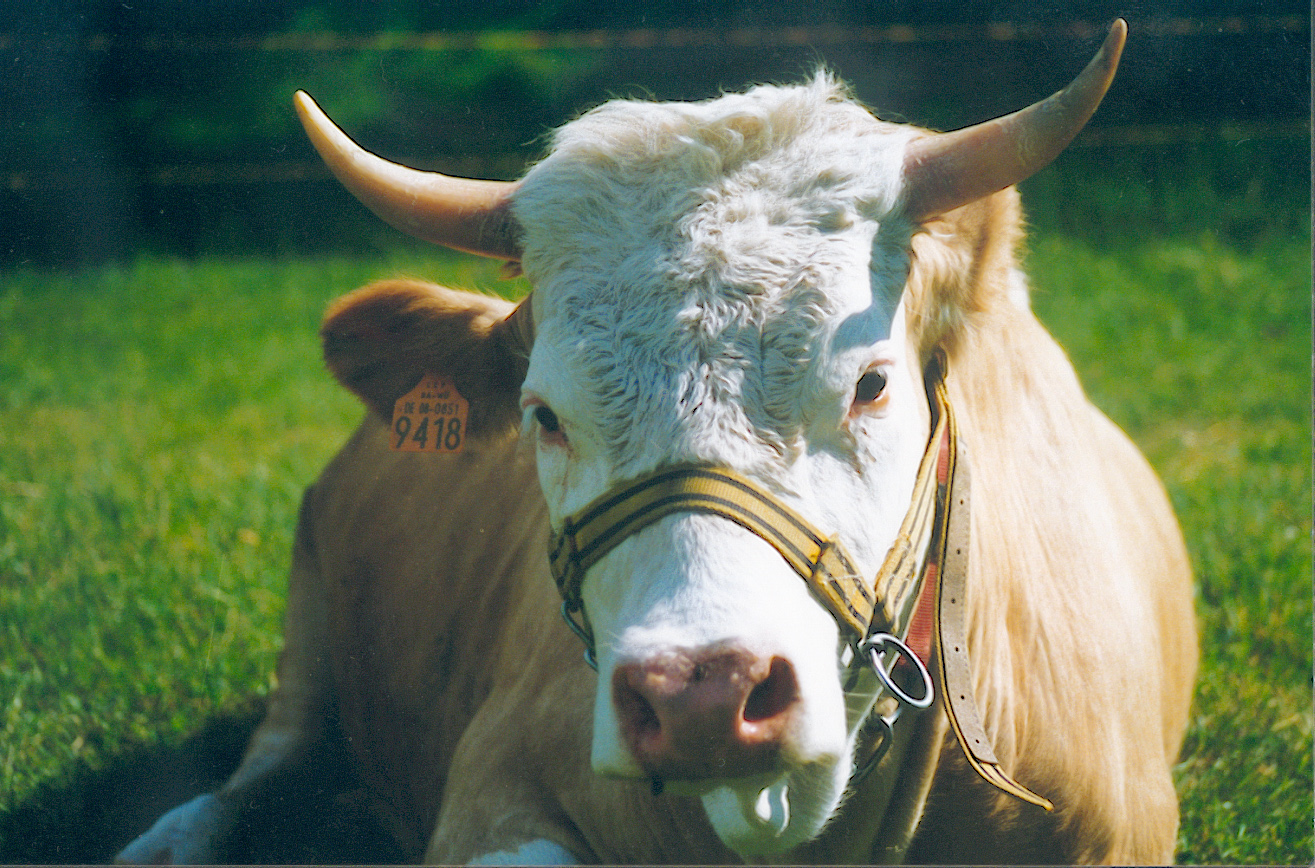
Hinterwald cow lying down

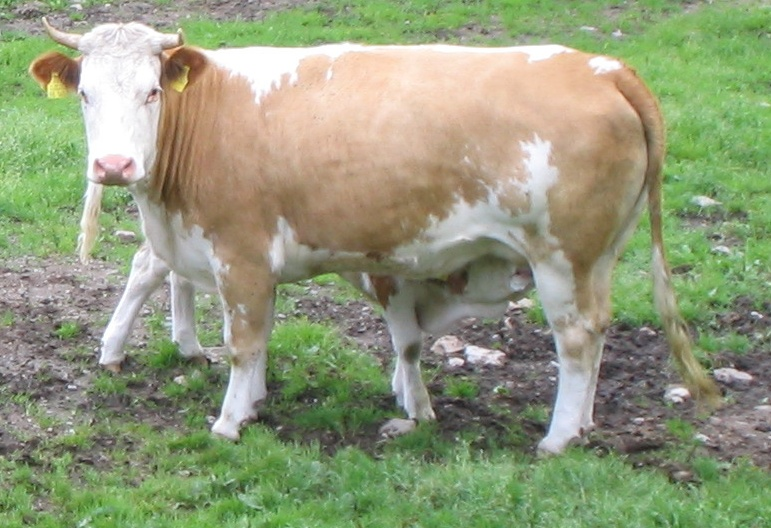
Hinterwald cow suckling a calf

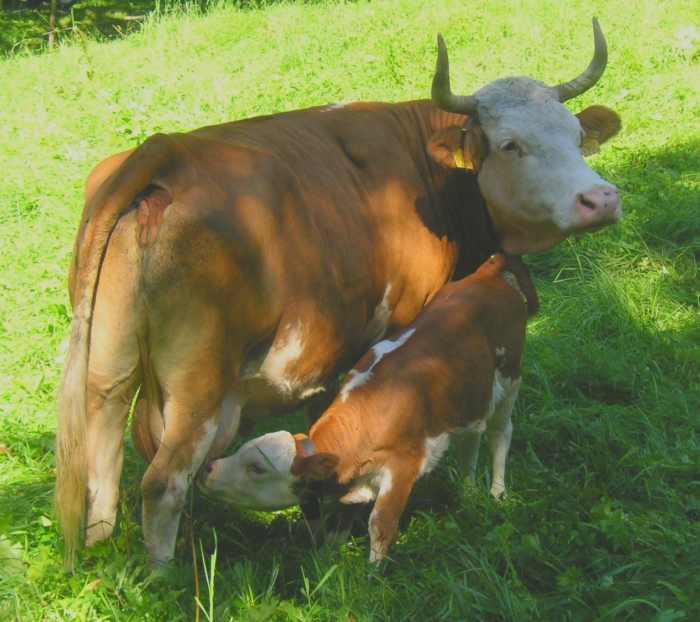
Hinterwald cow and calf at Ballenberg, Switzerland

== See also ==
- Vorderwald (Vorderwälder Rind)
- Black Forest
- Black Forest Horse (Schwarzwälder Kaltblut)
