= Vorderwald =

German breed of cattle

Vorderwälder Rind (Vorderwald)
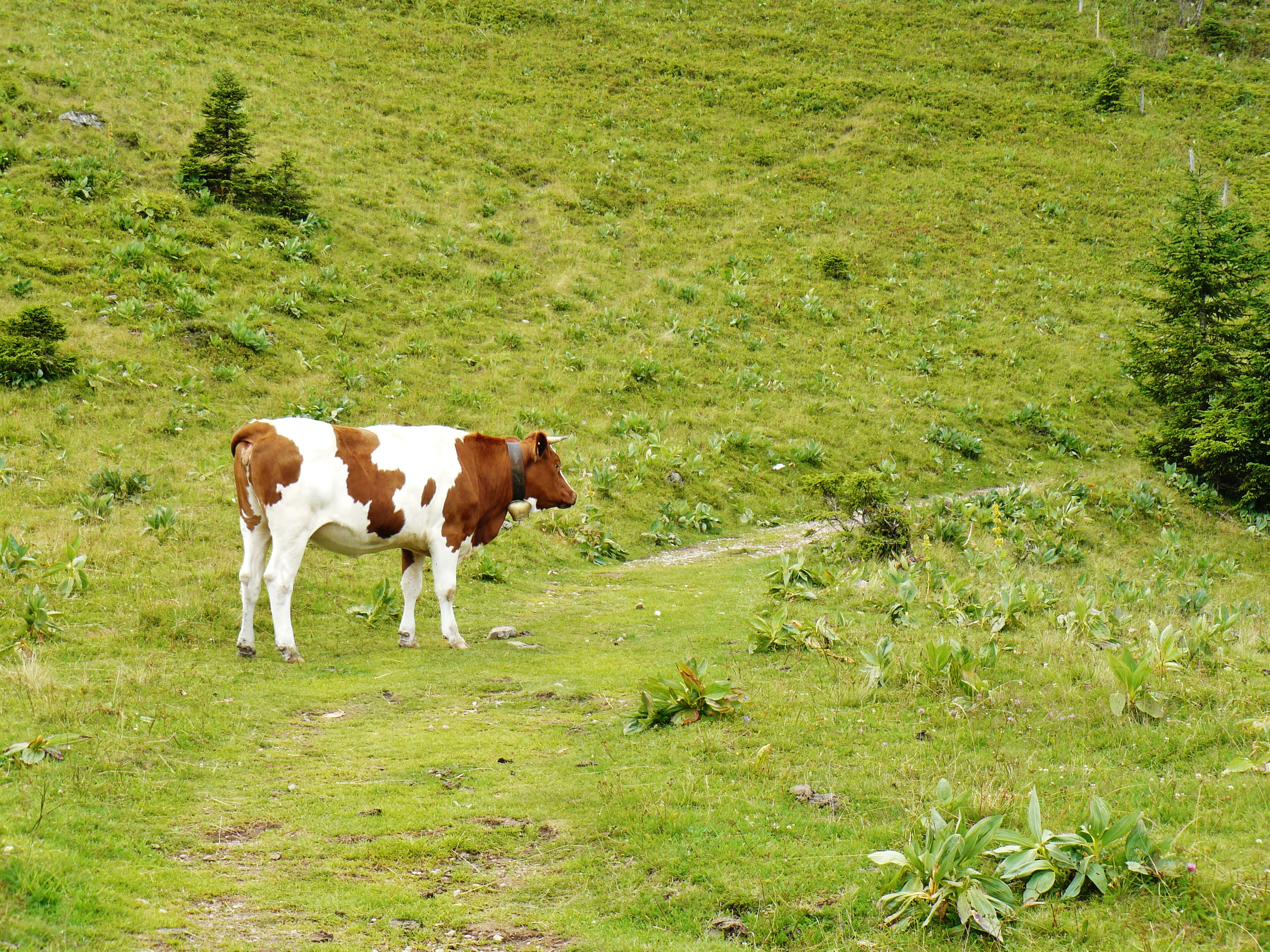
- Country of origin: Black Forest (Germany)

Traits
- Weight: Male: 950-1.050 kg; Female: 550-650 kg
- Height: Male: 140-150 cm; Female: 135-138 cm

The Vorderwald (German: Vorderwälder Rind, pronounced [ˈfɔʁdɐˌvɛldɐ ˈʁɪnt]) is a cattle breed originating from the Black Forest (Germany).

== History ==
The so-called "Wald Cattle" (Wäldervieh) were mentioned for the first time in 1544. The Vorderwälder (literally "from the frontwoods") adopted its name when they were distinguished from their somewhat smaller sister breed, the Hinterwälder (literally "from the backwoods"). A herdbook was established in 1896. After 1960, there was some crossbreeding with Ayrshire cattle.

== Characteristics ==
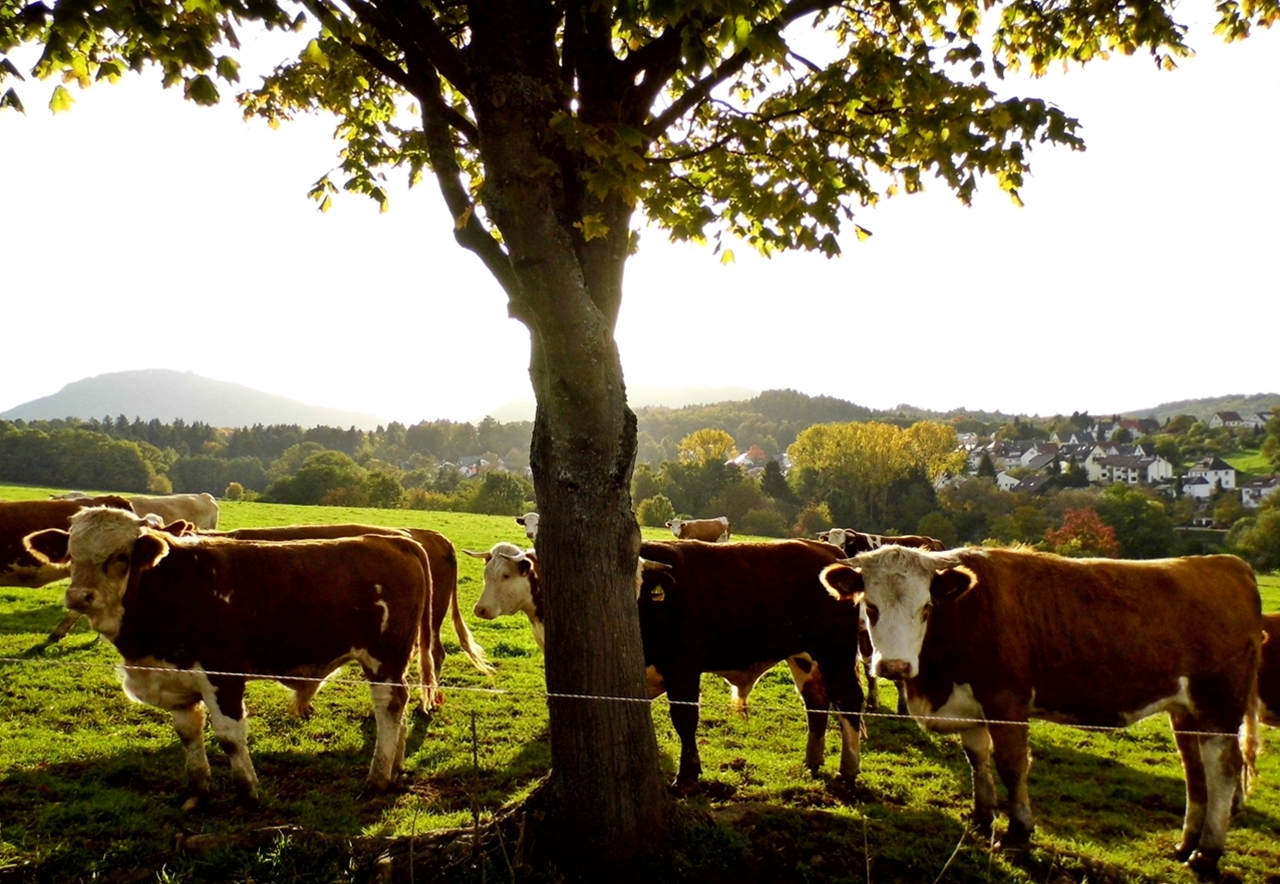
Vorderwälder cattle

They are reputed to be long-lived with strong legs and feet allowing them to graze on the mountains. The head and legs are generally white and the body has red, brown or even black patches or spots. They have forward curving horns. Cows are typically 135 cm tall at the withers and weigh about 600 kg. Bulls are typically 150 cm tall at the withers and weigh about 1050 kg.

== Population ==
In 2004 there were 4826 females in the herd book with numbers slowly declining.

== See also ==
- Hinterwald (Hinterwälder Rind)
- Black Forest
- Black Forest Horse (Schwarzwälder Kaltblut)

== Photo gallery ==
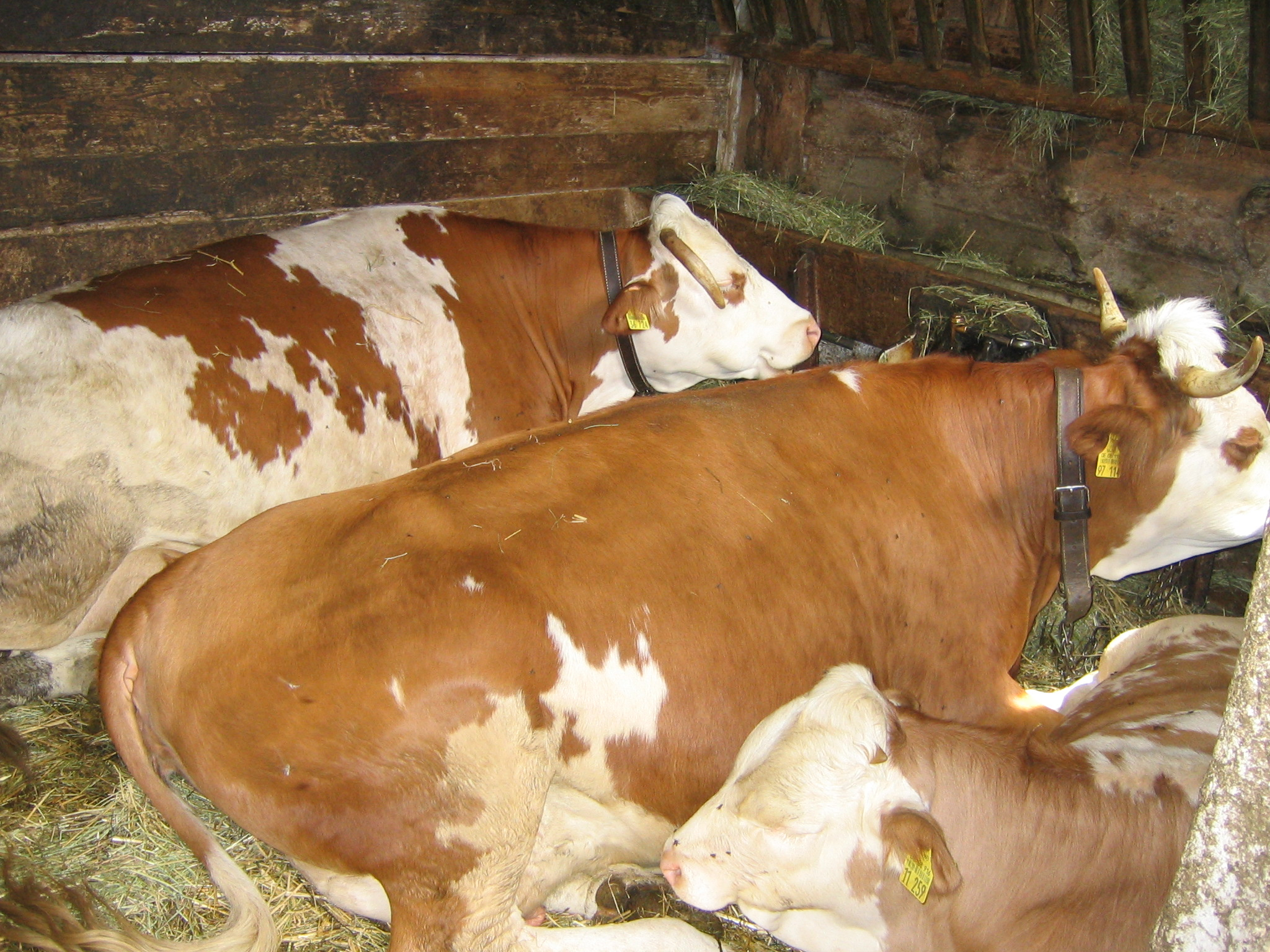

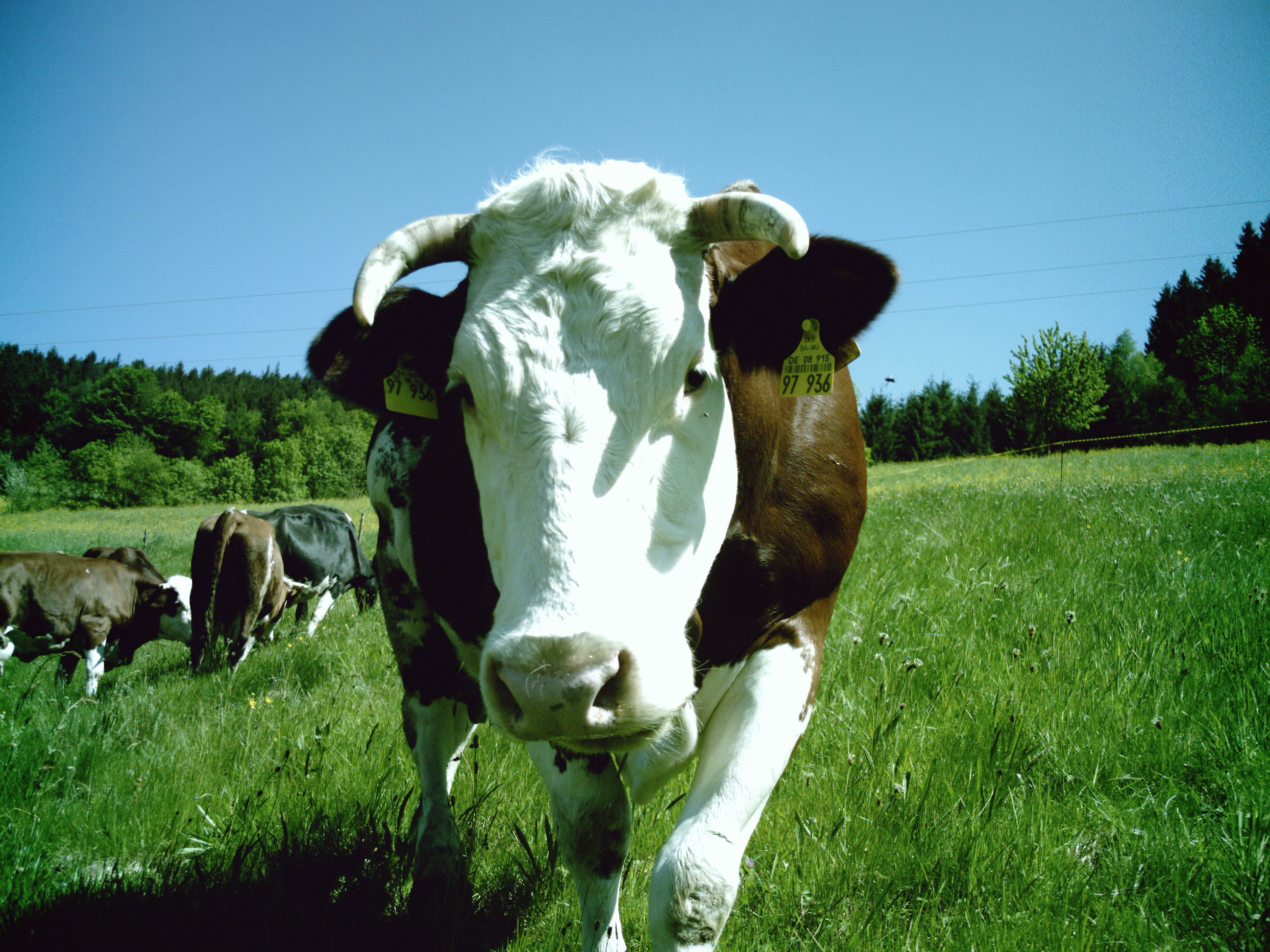

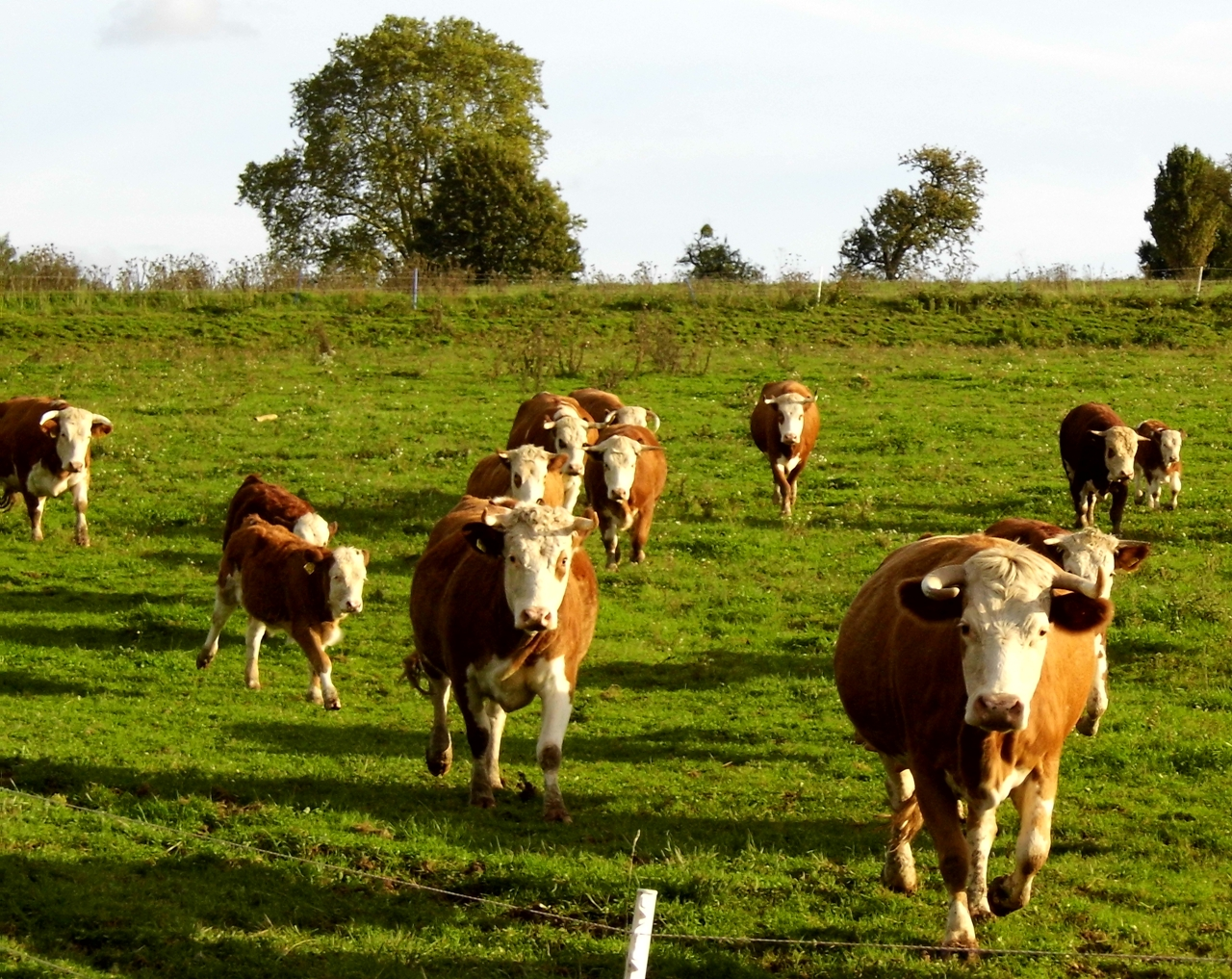
