= Tyrol Grey =

Breed of cattle

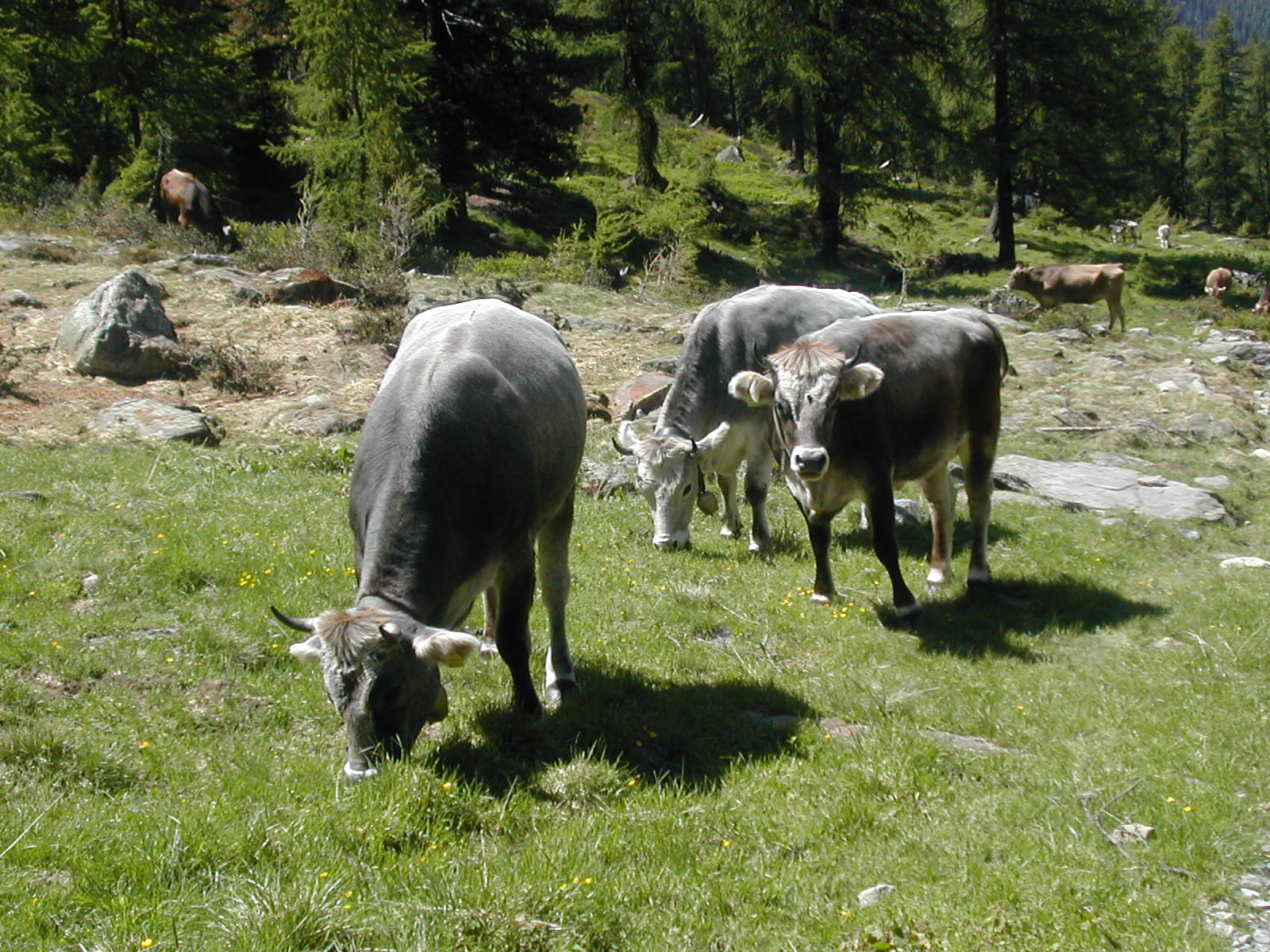
Tyrolean Grey cattle on the Verpeil Mountain Pasture in the Kauner Valley in Tyrol. Braunvieh in the background.

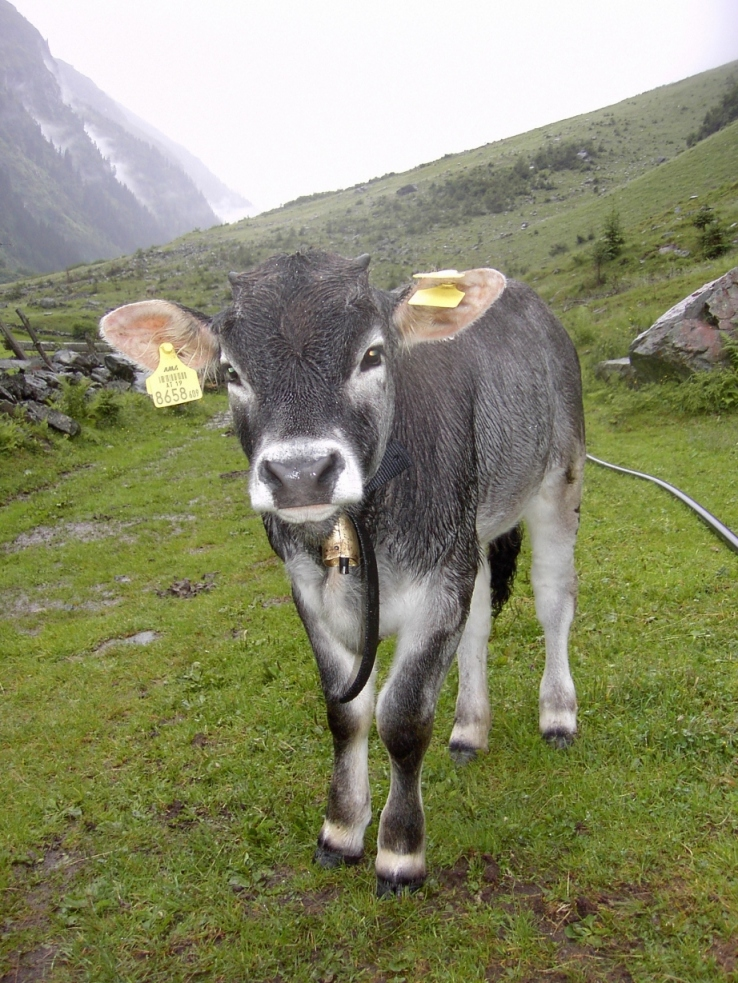
Tyrolean Grey calf in the Pitz Valley in Tyrol.

The Tyrol Grey or Tyrolean Grey (German: Tiroler Grauvieh, Italian: Grigio Alpina) is a typical alpine cattle breed from Tyrol in Austria and South Tyrol in Italy. It is a dual purpose breed with a very good milk and beef performance. The females grow up to their full size within three years and reach a weight of 550 – 600 kg. They have a correct fundament and hard claws.

The Tyrol Greys have a good forage instinct and feed conversion. They are also robust, longliving, and very fertile.

The milk has an excellent quality and is adequate either for the direct consumption or for the processing to high-quality products (cheese, butter, yogurt). Among the mountain cattle breeds in Italy the Tyrol Grey has the best milk amount/milk quality (fat, protein) ratio and delivers a higher amount of contents for the processing to quality products. The above-average per cow was 2002 in the South Tyrol about 4,836 kg milk per annum, 3.78% milk fat content, and 3.38% protein (8,491 control cows). When you evaluate the performance you have to allow for the middle body weight and the tough feeding and husbandry conditions in mountain regions.

The Tyrolean Grey cattle is a dual purpose breed for milk and beef and possesses an excellent mast ability and beef quality.

Breeding purpose is the advancement of milk and beef quantity and quality. Furthermore it is the purpose to conserve the typical functional attributes of the breed: middle body height, robust constitution, correct fundament, hard claws, hardiness, mountain pasture competence, good fertility, easy calving, udder quality and good milkability.
