= Rendena =

Breed of cattle

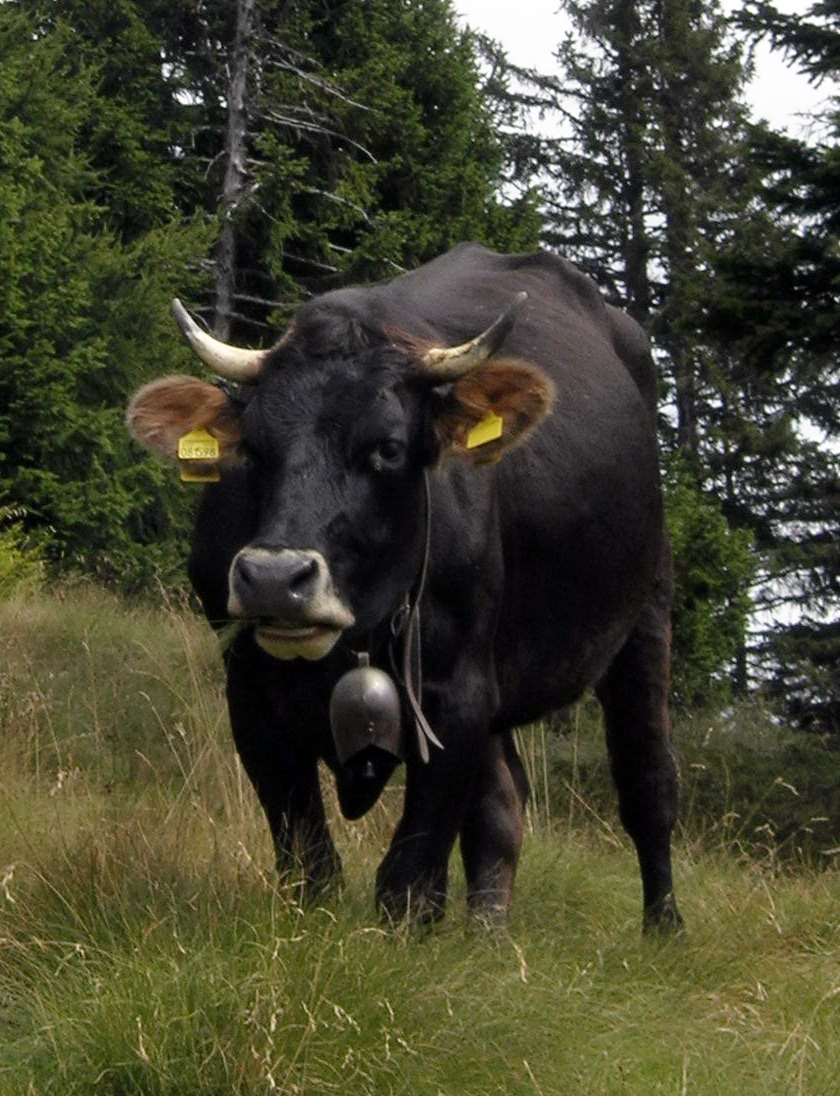
- Country of origin: Italy
- Distribution: Trentino; Veneto
- Use: Dual-purpose: milk and beef

Traits
- Weight: Male: 500–600 kg; Female: ca. 490 kg
- Height: Male: 125–130 cm; Female: 118–120 cm
- Coat: Chestnut to almost black, pale muzzle and dorsal stripe
- Horn status: Horned

The Rendena is a breed of cattle from the Trentino, in north-eastern Italy, now raised principally in the provinces of Padova, Trento, Verona and Vicenza. It is particularly suited to transhumant management; almost all the stock in the Trentino spends the summer months on the mountain pastures of the Val Rendena, and more than half of that in the Veneto summers on the Altopiano di Asiago.

== History ==
The Rendena originates from the area of the Val Rendena and the Giudicarie, where the first documented importation of stock from Switzerland was in 1712. By the end of the nineteenth century the breed numbered more than 200,000 head, was distributed throughout the Trentino and the Veneto, and had become the principal milk breed of the area. It suffered a major decline in the early 20th century, both as a result of the two World Wars and because of political pressures to replace it with the Bruna Alpina breed. From 1942, use of Rendena bulls for breeding was forbidden by law, and the population fell to a few thousand head. A breeders' association, the Associazione Nazionale Allevatori Bovini di Razza Rendena, was formed in 1976. A population of 6986 was reported in 2007. The Rendena is not among the sixteen minor Italian cattle breeds of limited diffusion recognised and protected by the Ministero delle Politiche Agricole Alimentari e Forestali, the Italian ministry of agriculture.

== Use ==
The Rendena is a good milk producer. Yields from primiparous ("first-calf") cows that spend 100 days or more on high alpine pasture average 4733 kg per lactation; the milk has 3.50% fat and 3.36% protein. Cows that receive cattle-feed year-round average over 6000 kg per lactation. Razza Rendena cheese may be made only from the milk of Rendena cows, which is also used in the production of Spressa delle Giudicarie DOP cheese.

Rendena calves may be slaughtered as milk veal, or at the age of 12–13 months, when they weigh 400–450 kg and yield 58–60% of good quality meat.
