= Hérens cattle =

Breed of cattle

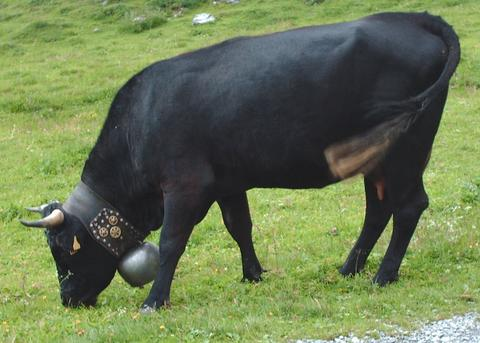
Hérens cow

The Hérens (Eringer in German) is a breed of cattle named after the Val d'Hérens region of Switzerland. These small, horned alpine cattle are coloured black, brown or dark red, often with a lighter stripe along the spine. The cows are used in organised cow fights.

== Characteristics ==
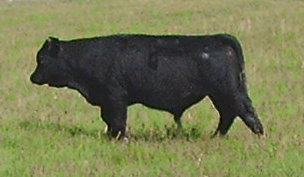
Hérens steer

Hérens cattle are a small Alpine breed. Their coat is unicoloured, ranging from dark red to brown or black. Newborn calves are typically red with a dark dorsal stripe; as they grow, this coloration reverses during moulting, with the body turning black and the stripe becoming red.] A distinguishing feature is their short, broad head with a straight forehead and a wide muzzle. The animals are muscular and have strong horns.

Mature bulls are usually 122–132 cm tall and weigh between 650 and 950 kg. Cows are usually 118–128 cm tall and weigh between 480 and 800 kg.

== Breed history ==
The Hérens breed is thought to descend from an old Alpine cattle population once found between Austria and Savoy. Archaeological finds suggest that its ancestors were present by about 3000 BCE. A cranium from Saint Guérin near Sion has been linked to the breed. Hérens cattle are classified as the Brachycephalus type, with a broad skull. Blood type studies found the breed to be distinct from other Swiss cattle, but similar to the Tuxer cattle of Austria’s Zillertal. In 1925, a small number of breeding bulls were exchanged between the two breeds.

== Cow fighting ==
Hérens cows are naturally aggressive, especially towards other females. When they are turned out in spring, they fight to establish their place in the herd. This behavior is also used in organised cow fights in Valais and the Aosta Valley, where cows compete in weight classes. Winners go on to a national final held annually since 1922. The winner of each class receives a ceremonial bell, and one cow is named “queen of queens”.

In summer, selected cows graze together on Alpine pastures. At the end of the season, the herders choose the queen of the herd. She leads the désalpe procession back to the valley, wearing a crown of flowers.

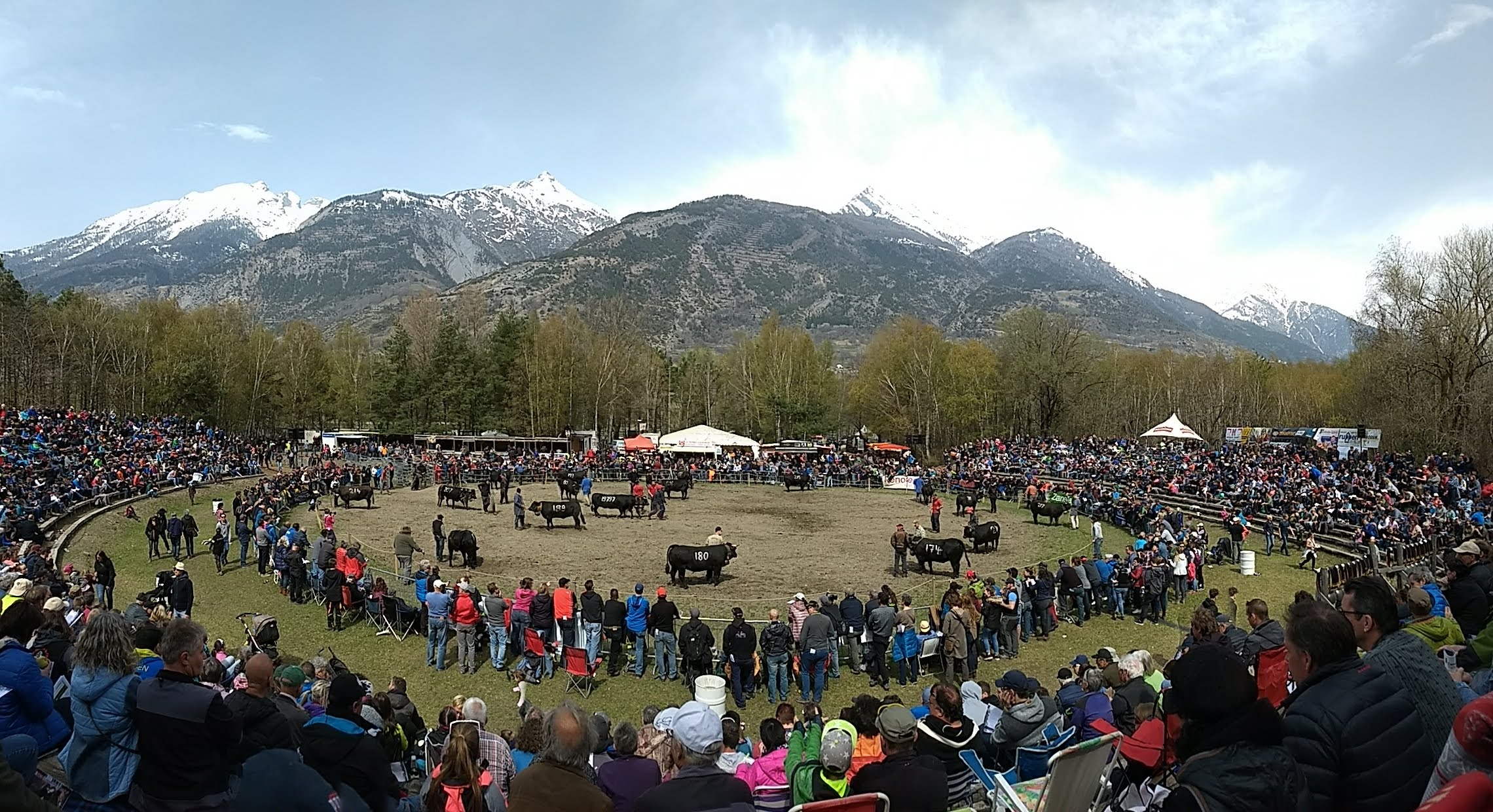
Fights between Hérens cattle are watched by thousands of locals and tourists in Valais, Switzerland.

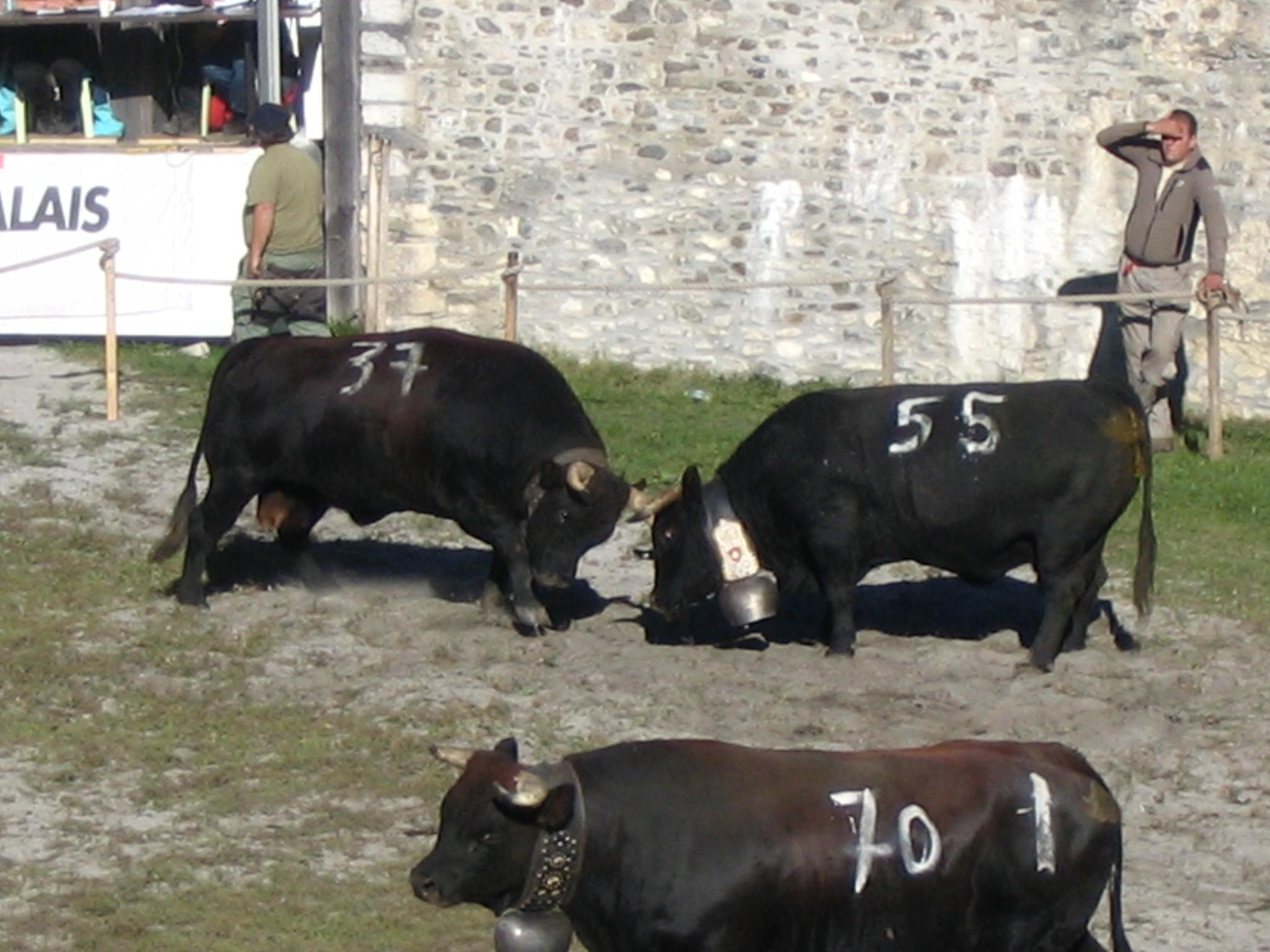
A fight between Hérens cows
