= Tarkeshwar Rural Municipality =

Tarakeshwar Gaupalika तारकेश्वर गाउँपालिका
- Gaupalika
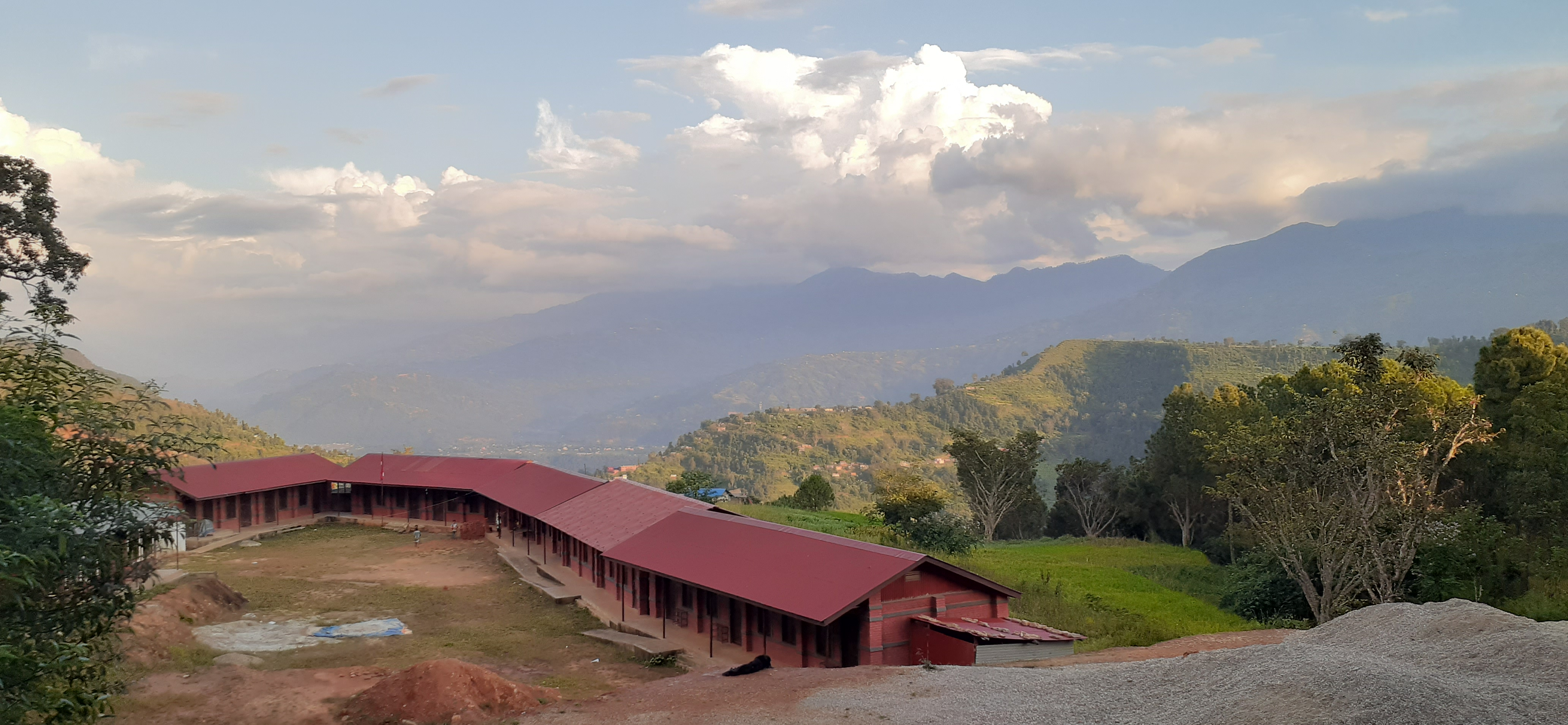
- Shree Bhamara Basic School, Tarkeshwor Gaupalika, Ward-6

- Location in Nuwakot District Tarakeshwar Gaupalika (Nepal) Tarakeshwar Gaupalika (Asia)
- Country: Nepal
- Province: Bagmati Province
- District: Nuwakot District
- Established: 11 March 2018

Government
  - Chairman: Shiva Adhikari (NC)
  - Vice Chairman: Hari Prasad Rimal (CPN)

Area
  - Total: 72.62 km^{2} (28.04 sq mi)

Population (2011 Nepal census)
  - Total: 15,719
  - Density: 216.5/km^{2} (560.6/sq mi)
- Time zone: UTC+5:45 (NST)
- Website: www.tarakeshwormunnuwakot.gov.np

Tarakeshwar Rural Municipality is a Gaunpalika in Nuwakot District in Bagmati Province of central Nepal that was established in 11 March 2018 by merging the former Village Development Committees Khadga Bhanjyang (Ward no. 1 and 3), Gorsyang, Taruka and Dangsing. The headquarters of Tarkeshwor Gaupalika is located in Dangsing.

As it is located on the banks of the Trishuli River and has an on-site observation of the China-Nepal Railway from here, there is a good chance of prosperity if the opportunity is used properly.

It also has a high chance of tourist potential due to its historical, cultural and natural heritages, such as Taruka's Bull fighting, Dhiki-Jato Chulo and other site to make a name for itself in the National and International arena.

The Gaupalika is divided into 6 Wards. The total area of this Gaupalika is 72.62 square kilometer and the total population is 15,719 as per the 2011 Nepal census.

== Etymology ==
The Gaupalika is named as Tarakeshwor because of the Lord Shiva Temple located at Taruka which is known as Tarakeshwar.

== Boundaries ==
- East: Bidur Municipality
- West: Nilkantha Municipality(Dhading District)
- North: Myagang Rural Municipality
- South: Belkotgadhi Municipality

== Gallery ==
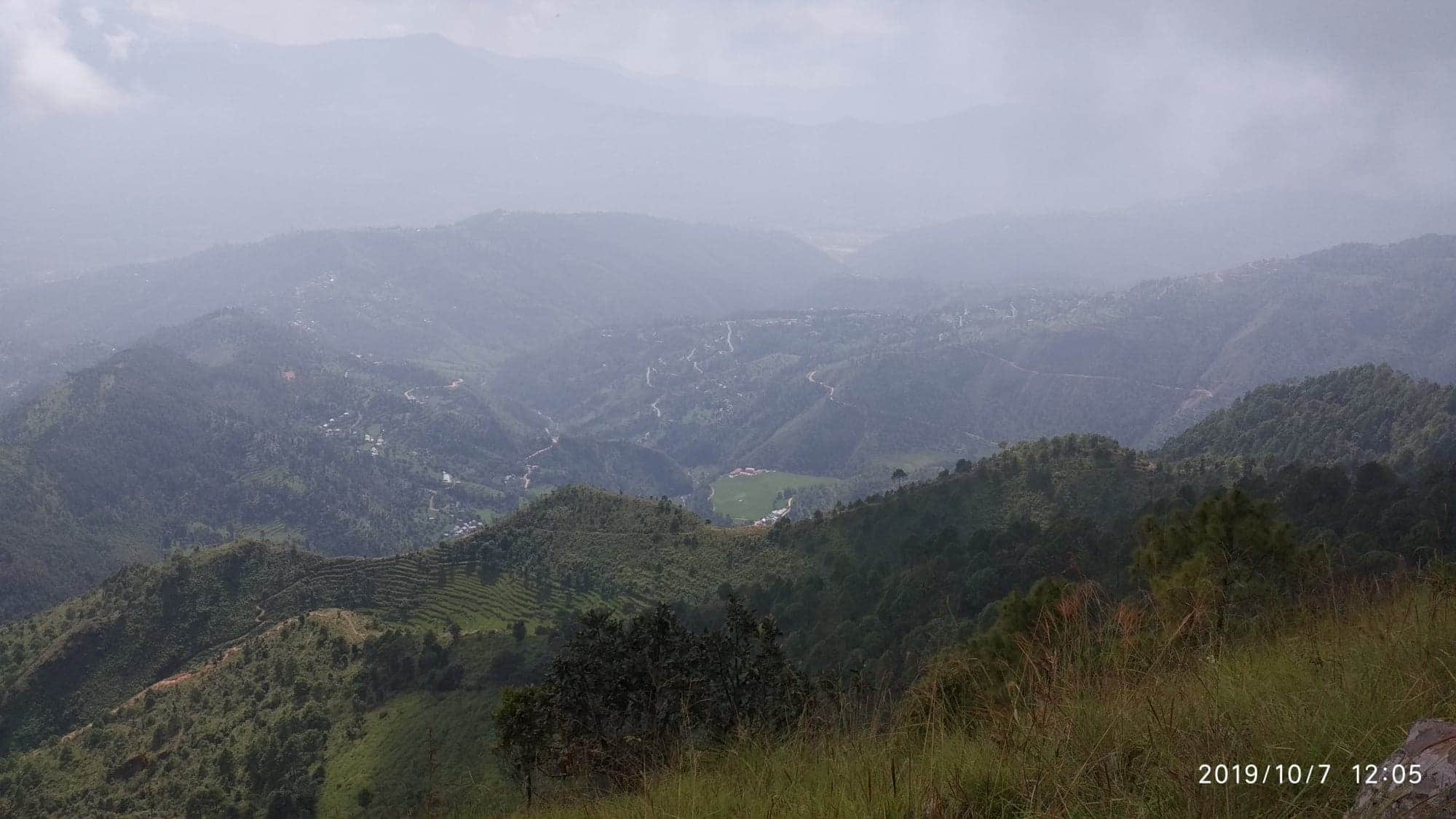
The view from Dhiki-Jato Chuli

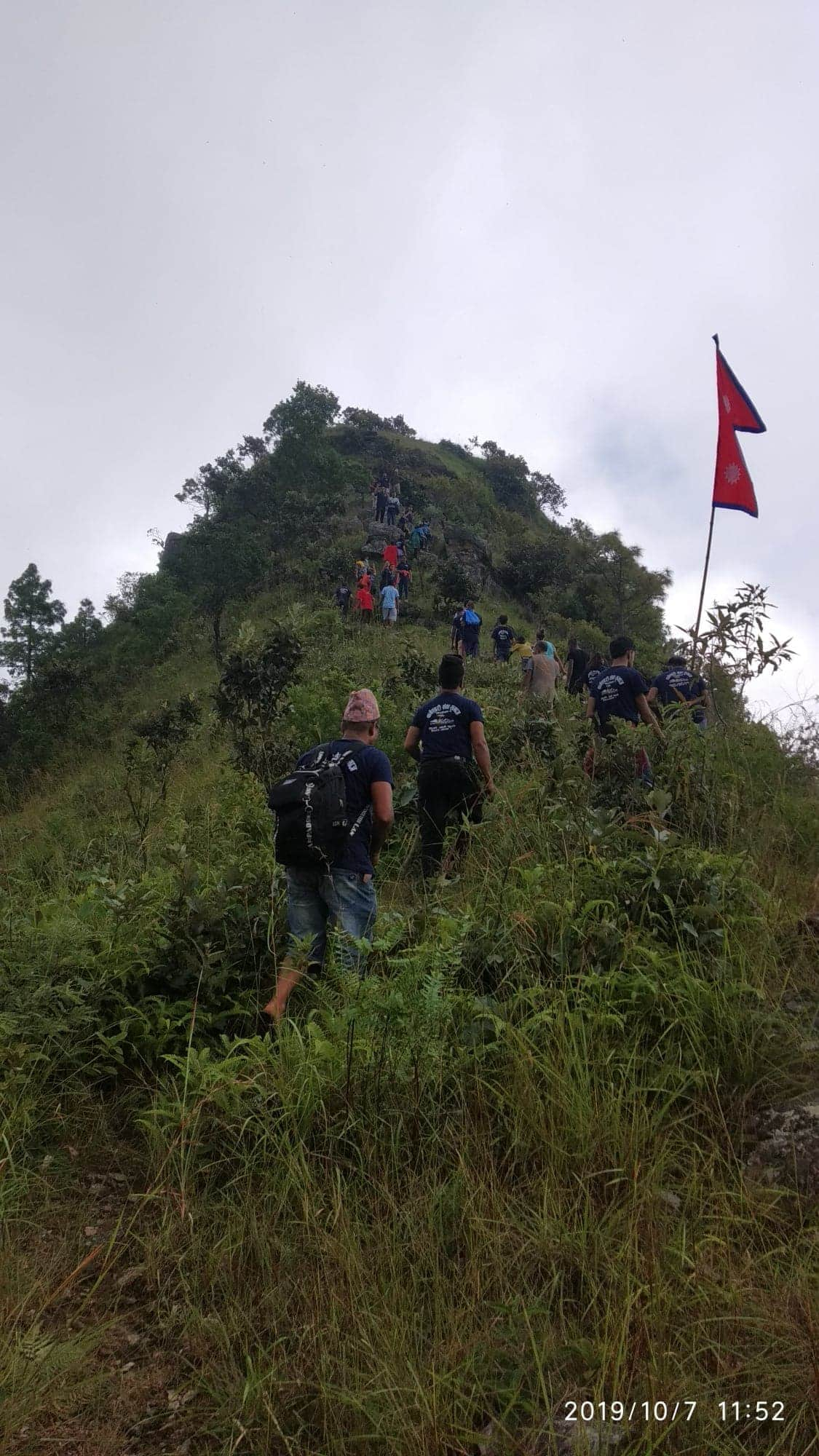
Dhiki-Jato Chuli

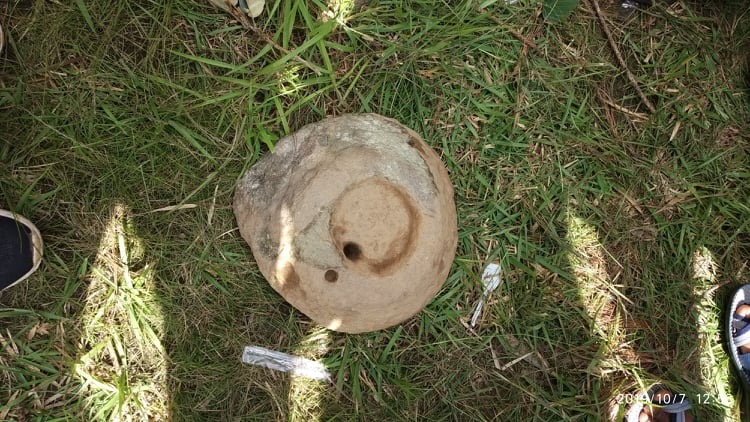
Jato of Dhiki-Jato Chuli

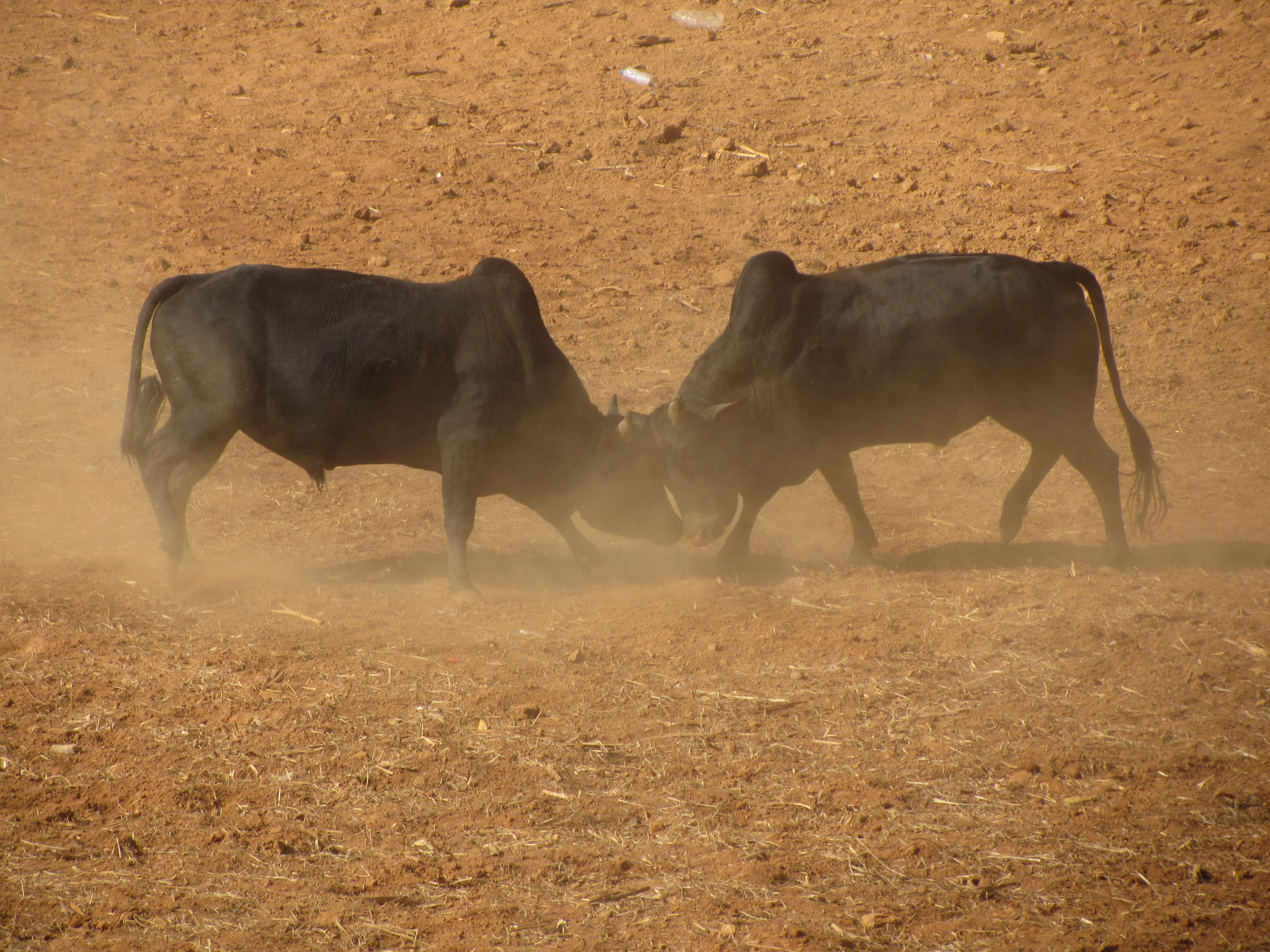
Bullfight in Taruka

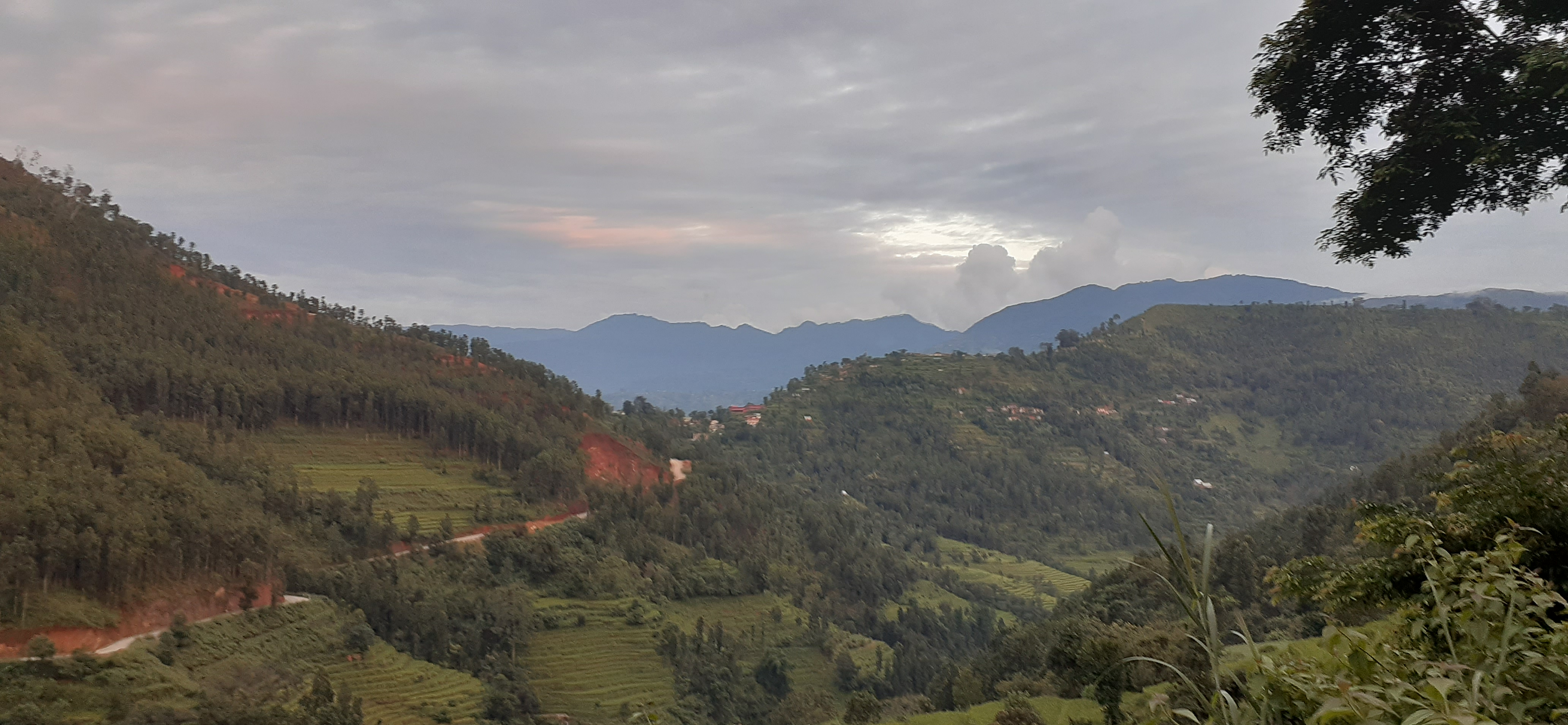
View of Khadga Bhanjyang from Tarkeshwar-6
