= List of Melas in Nepal =

This is a list of Melās celebrated in various provinces of Nepal.

Province in Nepal

== Koshi Province ==
- Kumbha Mela- celebrate every 12 years at Barahakshetra.
- Mai Beni Mela - celebrated annually on Maghe Sankranti in Ilam district.
- Chosak Tangnam Chisapani Mela- celebrated in Chisapani, Ilam every year by Kirat, Rai and Limbu people.
- Gajurmukhi Mela- celebrated every year on Kartik Purnima by Limbu people on Deumai river bank in Ilam district.
- Haleshi Mahadev Mela - celebrated for 16 days in Khotang District every year starting on Ram Nawami.
- Budda Subba Mela- celebrated every year on Baisakh Purnima at Sunsari District.

== Madhesh Province ==
- Gadhimai Mela- celebrated every five years in Bara district.
- Bhoot Mela- celebrated every year in Siraha district.

== Bagmati Province ==
- Makar Mela- celebrated every 12 years in Panauti on Maghe Sankranti.
- Devighat Mela- celebrated annually at Battar bazzar of Rasuwa District near the confluence of Suryamati river and Taadi river on Chitra Sulka Purnima and Haribodhini Ekadashi.
- Tribeni Dham Mela- celebrated every year on Maghe Ausi at Chitwan district.
- Gosaikunda Mela- celebrated every year on Janai Purnima by Hindus and Buddhists at Gosaikunda in Rasuwa district.

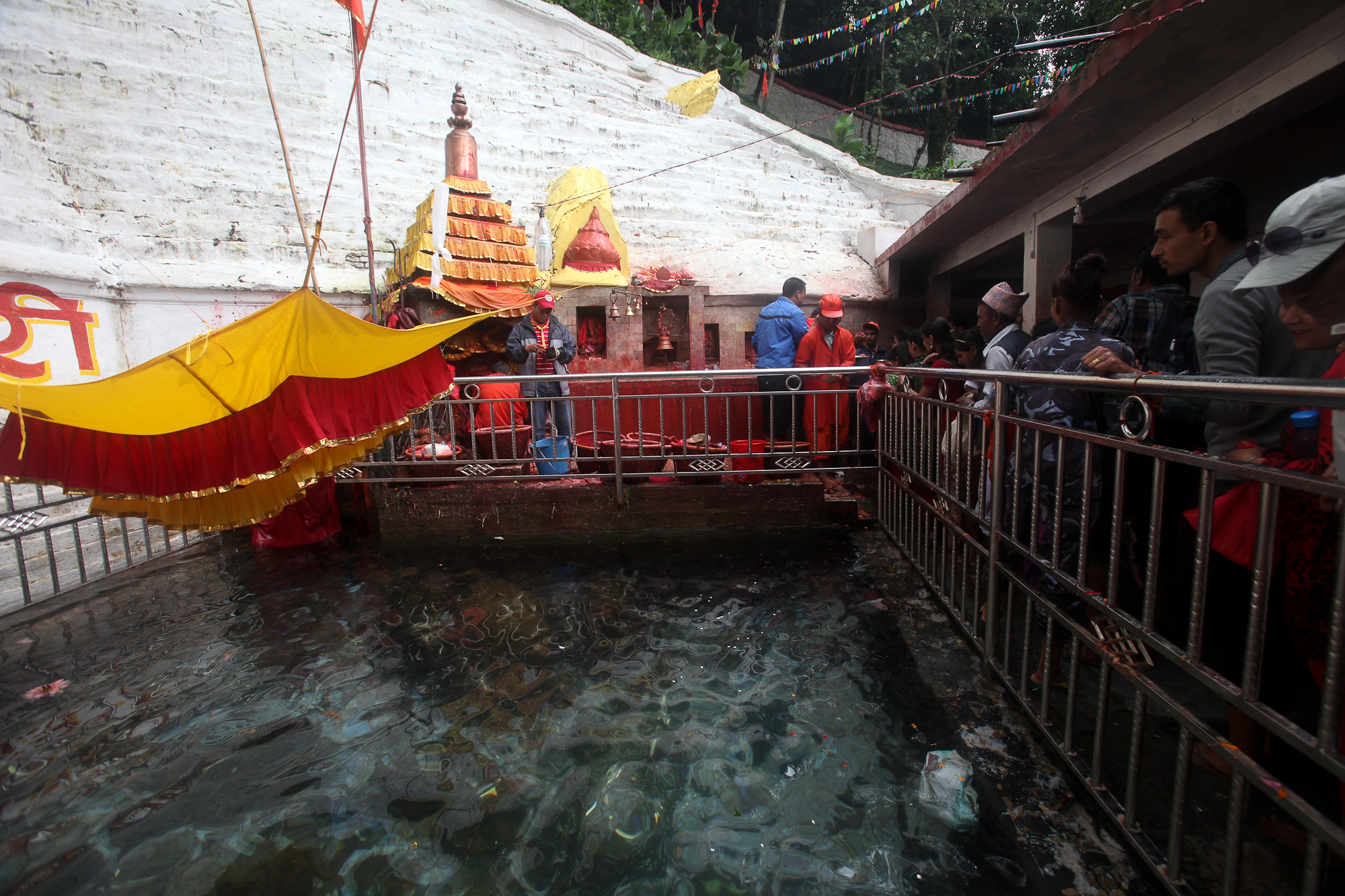
Godawari Mela

- Godavari Mela- celebrated every 12 years in Godavari, Lalitput.
- Matsya Narayana Mela - held every three years at Matsyanarayan's temple in Kathmandu.
- Taruka Bull Feast- celebrated every year on Maghe Sankranti in Nuwakot district.

== Gandaki Province ==
- Devghat Mela- celebrated every year on the occasion of Maghe Sakranti at the confluence of Kali Gandaki River and Trishuli River in Tanahu District.
- Baglung Kalika Mela- celebrated every year on Chaitra Astami in Baglung district.
- Yartung Mela-celebrated every year for three days by the Thakali people of Mustang district to mark the end of summer. Activities during the Mela include horse racing, dancing and singing. Traditionally, the head monk of the village initiates the festival. The first day is dedicated to the village chief, the second day to the monks, and the third to the general people. The Mela is based on Tibetian lunar calendar and starts on Janai Purnima (August full moon day).
- Dhunge Sanghu Mela (Nepali: ढुंगेसाँघुको मेला)- celebrated every year on Maghe Sakranti at the bank of Seti river in Pokhara.
- Shikles Maghe Mela (Nepali: सिक्लेस माघे संक्रान्ति मेला)- celebrated every year on Maghe Sakranti at Shikles village.

== Lumbini Province ==
- Ruru Mela- celebrated annually on Maghe Sankranti at the bank of Kali Gandaki River in Palpa district.
- Swargadwari Mela- celebrated annually in Baisakh Purnima and Kartik Purnima at Swargadwari Temple in Pyuthan District.

== Karnali Province ==
- Papini Mela (Nepali: पापिनी मेला)- celebrated annually in Musikot, Rukum.
- Subhaghat Mela(Nepali: शुभाघाट मेला) - celebrated annually in Gurbhakot

== Sudur Paschim Province ==
- Badi Malika Mela- celebrated annually on Bhadra Shulka Pakshya at Bajura district.
- Bijyanath Mela- celebrated annually on Shivaratri at Achham district at the confluence of Budhiganga river and Safekhola river.
