= Bull wrestling =

Non-lethal bloodsport between cattle

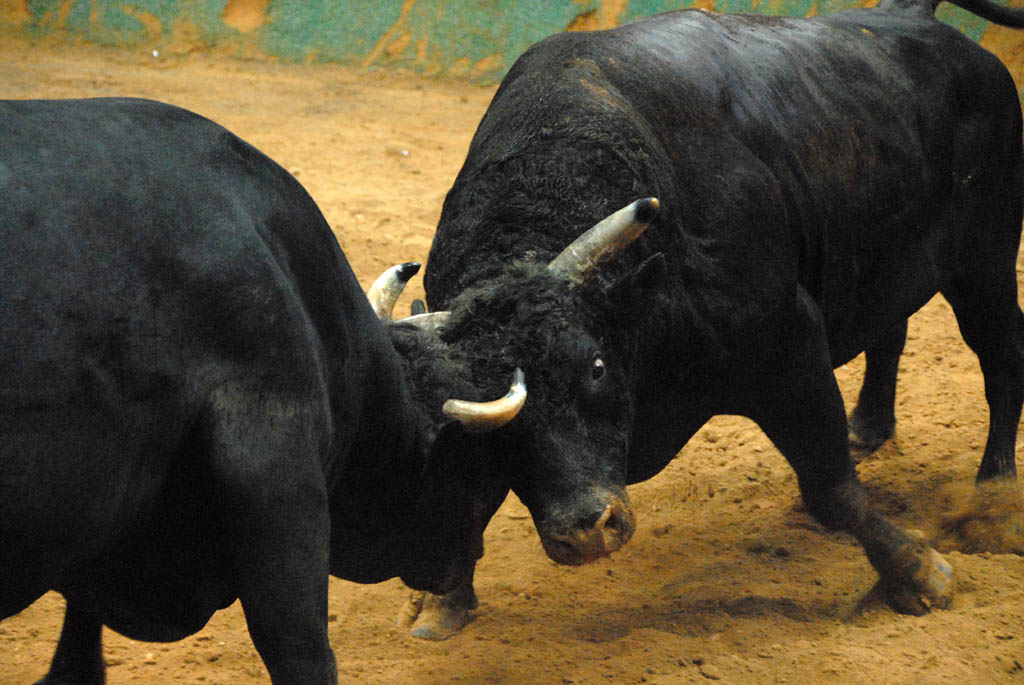
Tōgyū, or "Okinawan bullfighting", is a traditional sport in the Ryukyu Islands of Japan.

Bull wrestling, cow fighting or bull fighting is a non-lethal human-facilitated bloodsport between bulls or cows found in some parts of the world.

== Africa ==
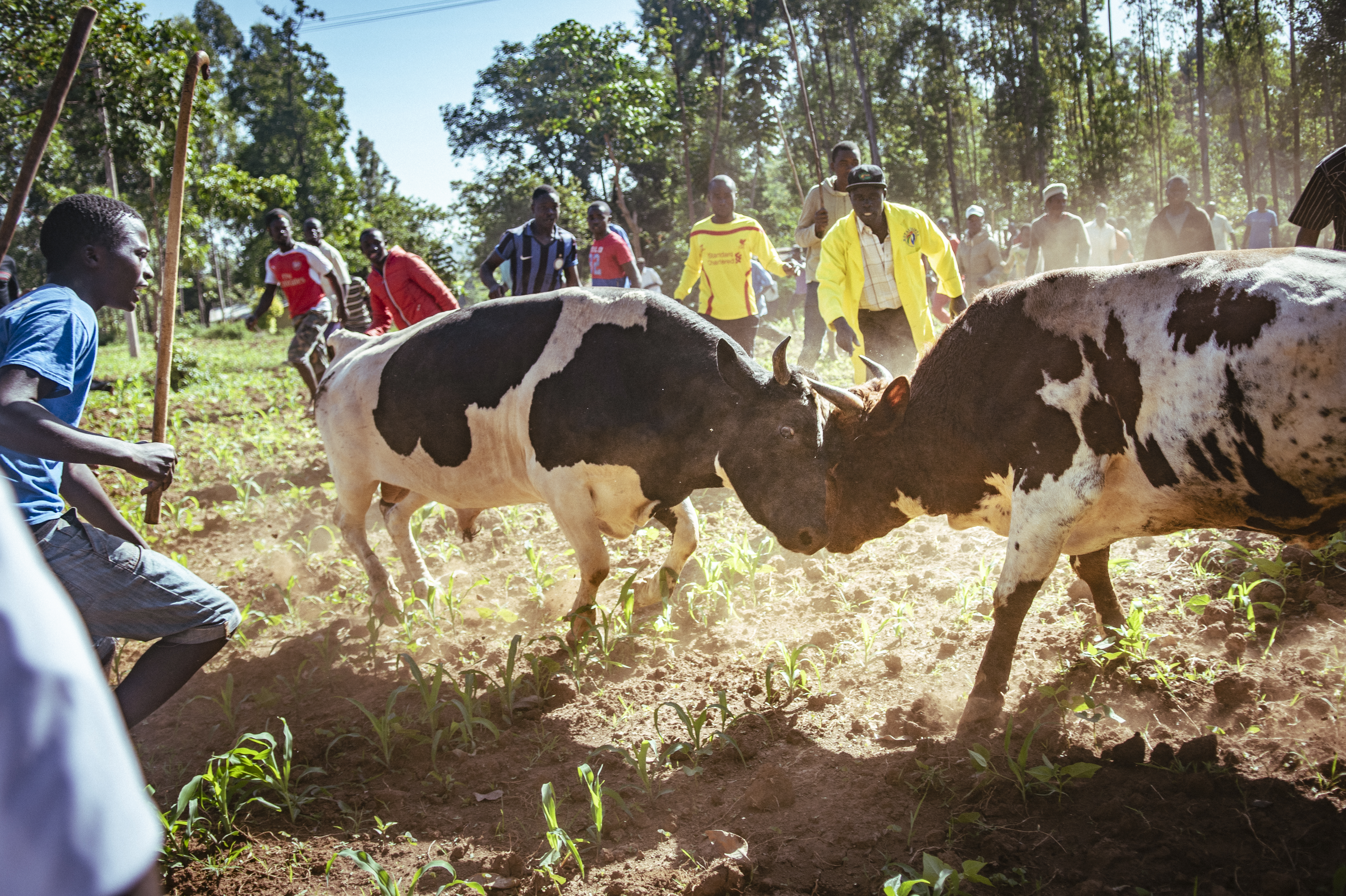
Bullfighting game in Kenya

The Luhya community in Kenya practices a bull-on-bull sport. Savika is a bull-wrestling sport practiced in Madagascar's central highlands.

== Europe ==
Korida, from corrida, or borbe bikova ("fights of bulls") is a traditional national sport of both Bosnia and Herzegovina and Croatia. Cow fighting is also a tradition in parts of Switzerland and northern Italy.

=== Bosnia and Herzegovina ===
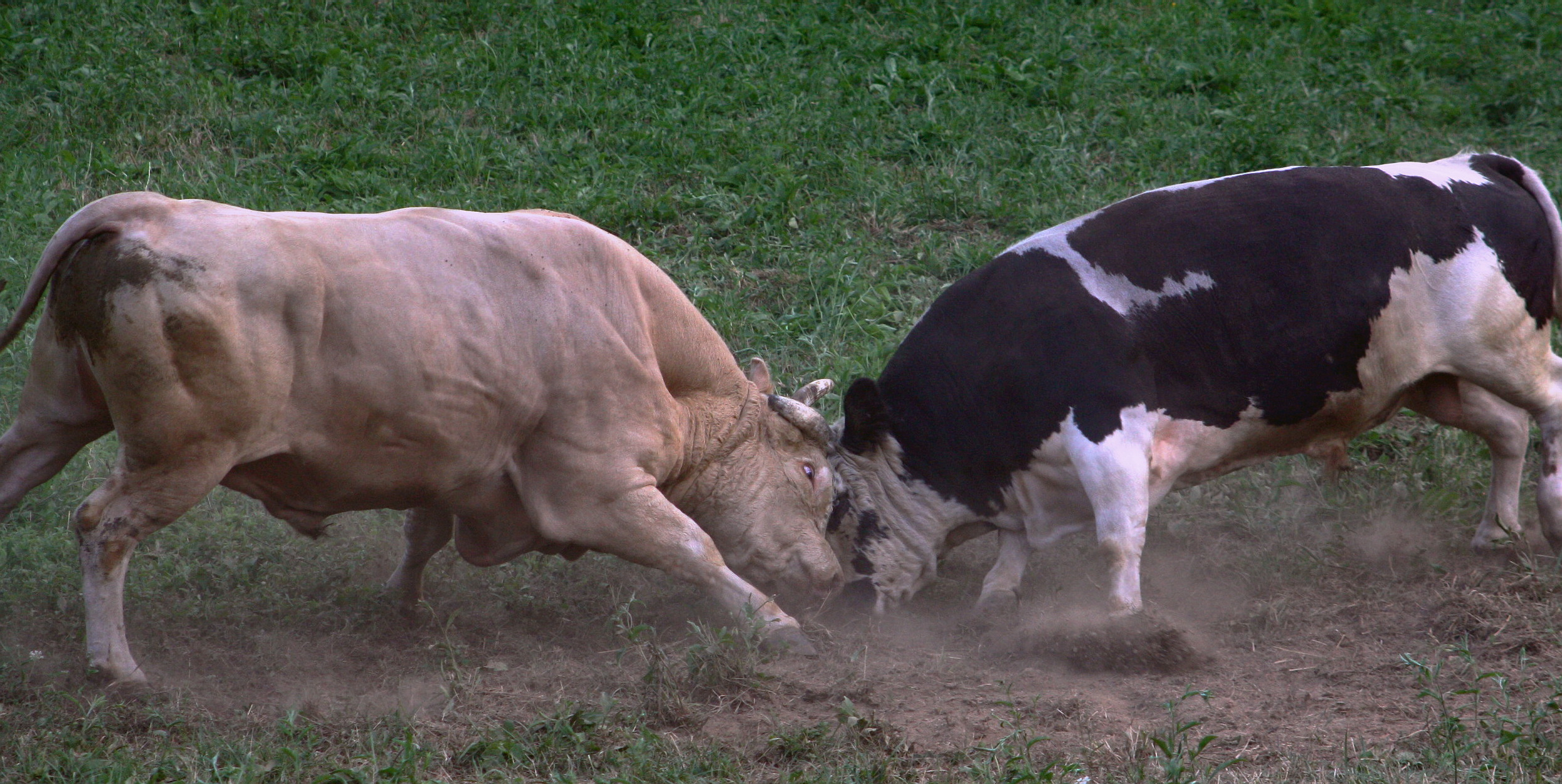
Traditional korida in Sanski Most, Bosnia and Herzegovina

In Bosnia and Herzegovina, the fights are most popular in Bosanska Krajina, where the famous Corrida of Grmeč (Grmečka korida) is held. Grmeč, a mountain in the extreme west of Bosnia, is the best-known site of Korida of Grmeč bullfights in the Balkans. These are fights between bulls themselves and there is no death of a bull. The fight is won when the losing bull turns his back and flee from the fight. Fights happen in an empty field, and have been organised on every first Sunday in August for over 200 years, attracting thousands of visitors. The fights were brought about to Western Balkans, mostly Bosnia and bordering Dalmatian Hinterland in Croatia, by the Ottomans from Turkey, where they are popular for hundreds of years.

The korida of Grmeč was depicted by the sculptor Slobodan Pejić. The sculpture of two bulls in a fight, made in bronze in 2004, has been compared to a confrontation of the oppressor and the oppressed or of the Bosnian people and the Austrian Emperor.

Similar fights are organized in several places around Bosnia and Herzegovina, such Sanski Most, Cazin, Velika Kladuša, all in Bosanska Krajina, but also in central and eastern parts of the country, such as Vitez and Olovo's nearby villages Čevljanovići and Boganovići.

=== Croatia ===
In Croatia, koridas are traditionally organized in Dalmatian Hinterland region.

== East and Southeast Asia ==
Bull wrestling (Ushi no tsunotsuki) in Yamakoshi, Nagaoka City, Niigata Prefecture, Japan

- Tōgyū, known by some as "Okinawan bullfighting", is the traditional sport, in which two bulls attempt, as in sumo wrestling, to push one another out of a ring. It is still practised in the various places in Japan, such as Niigata, Okinawa and Shimane Prefectures.
- Sossaum (Korean: 소싸움) is a traditional sport of Korea, in which two oxen are pitted against each other.
- Bullfighting is also observed by the ethnic Hmong/Miao minority in China, Vietnam and Laos. Bulls are selected by age, horn length and size. They are enticed to fight usually after new year's or summer events. They are usually non-lethal events and bulls that carry the opposing bulls will get the most points if it is a draw. The loser is usually the bull that flees first even if winning.

== South Asia ==
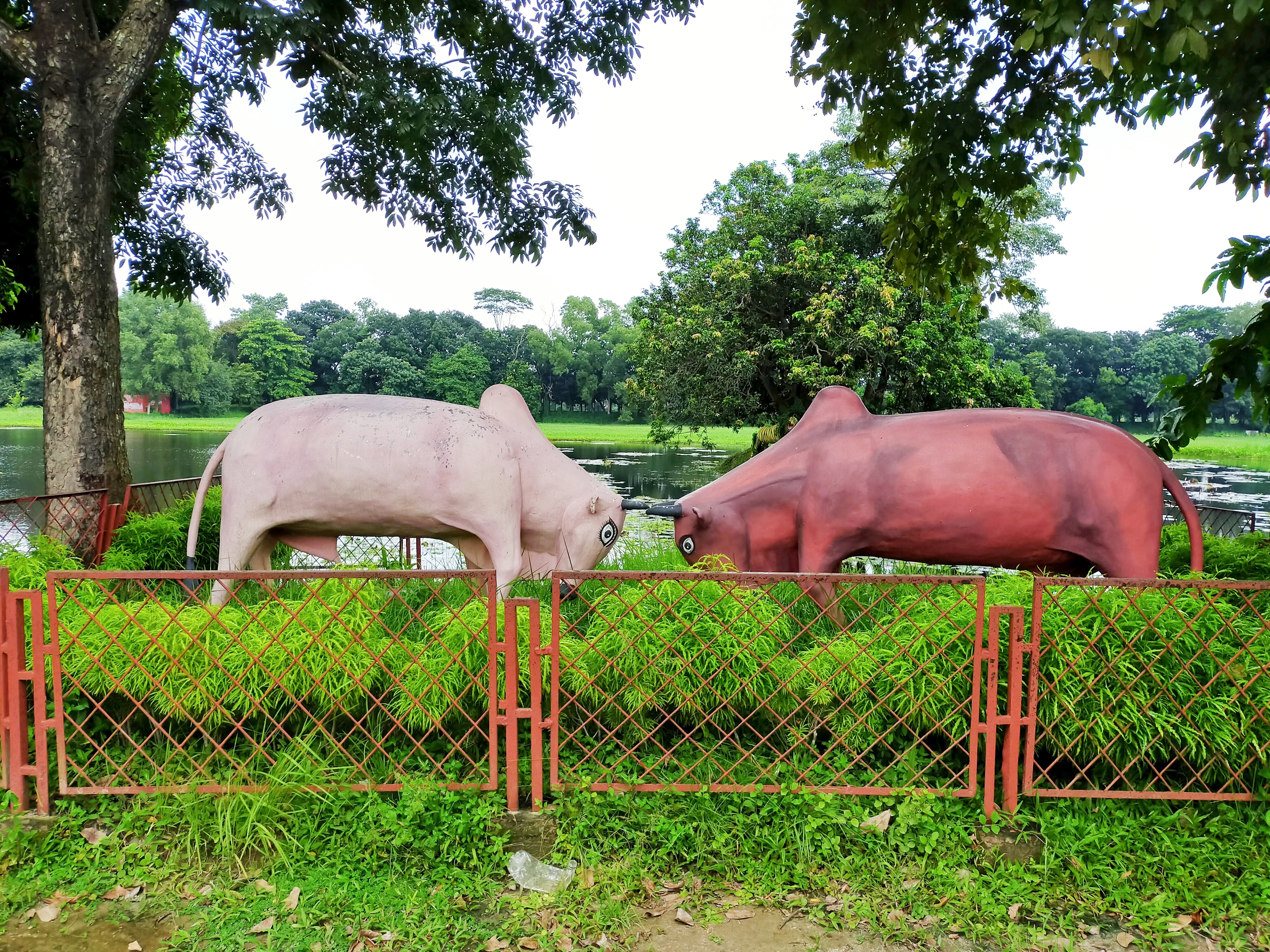
Bullfighting statue at Shilpacharya Zainul Abedin Folk Arts and Crafts Museum, Bangladesh

=== India ===
Dhiri or Dhirio (Konkani: धिरी,धिरयो) is a popular form of traditional bull wrestling in the state of Goa, Coastal South West India. It was the weekend entertainment staple for most villages. Many families lived off the earnings made on appearance money and bets alone. The Panaji Bench of the high Court vide order dated 20.12.96 directed the State Government to take immediate steps to ban all types of animal fights including Dhiri organised in the State of Goa, which was finally banned in 1997. Dhiri bullfights are still very popular in Goa despite the ban. There have been demands for legalizing Dhiri.

=== Nepal ===
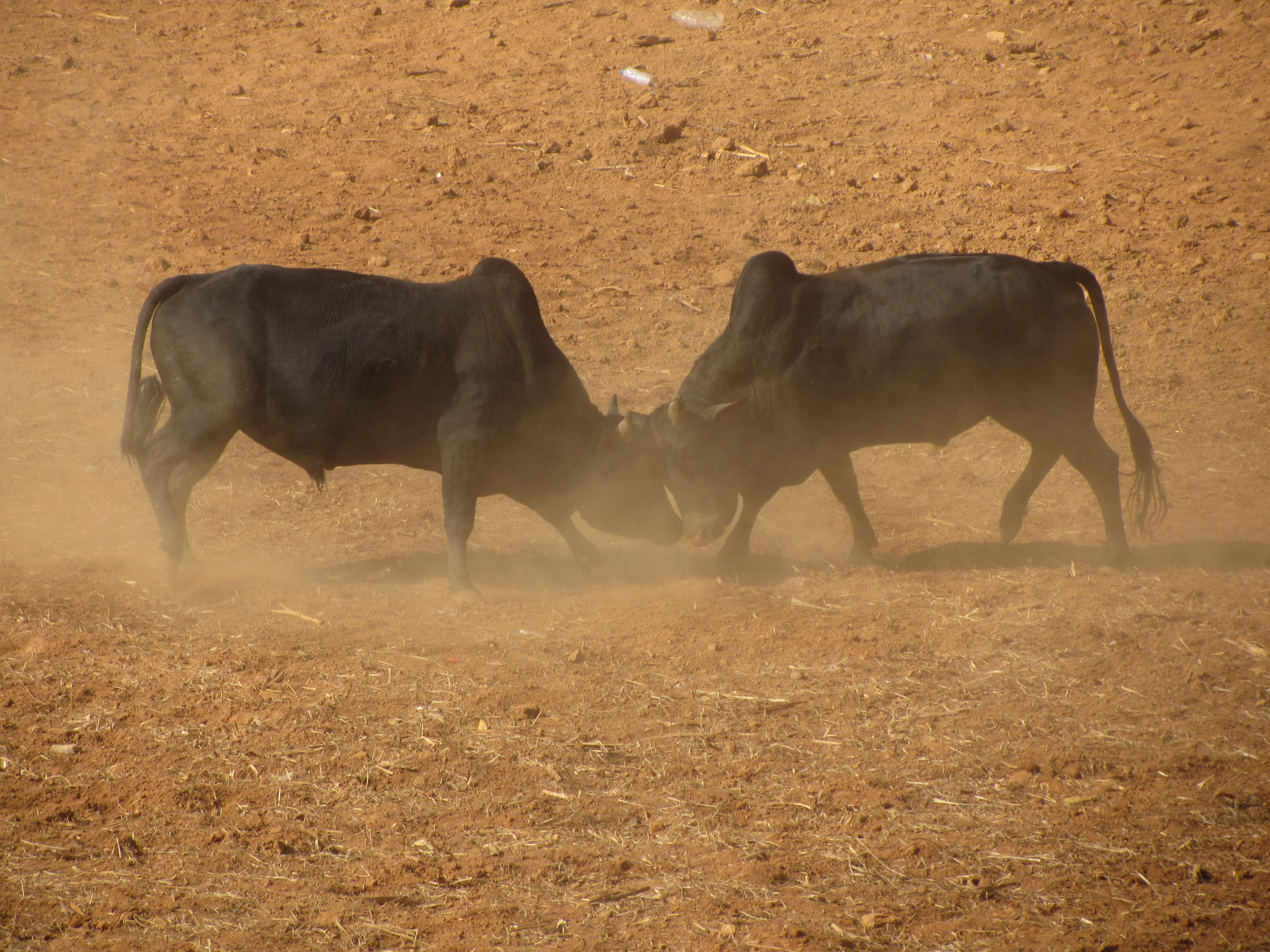
Bullfight in Taruka

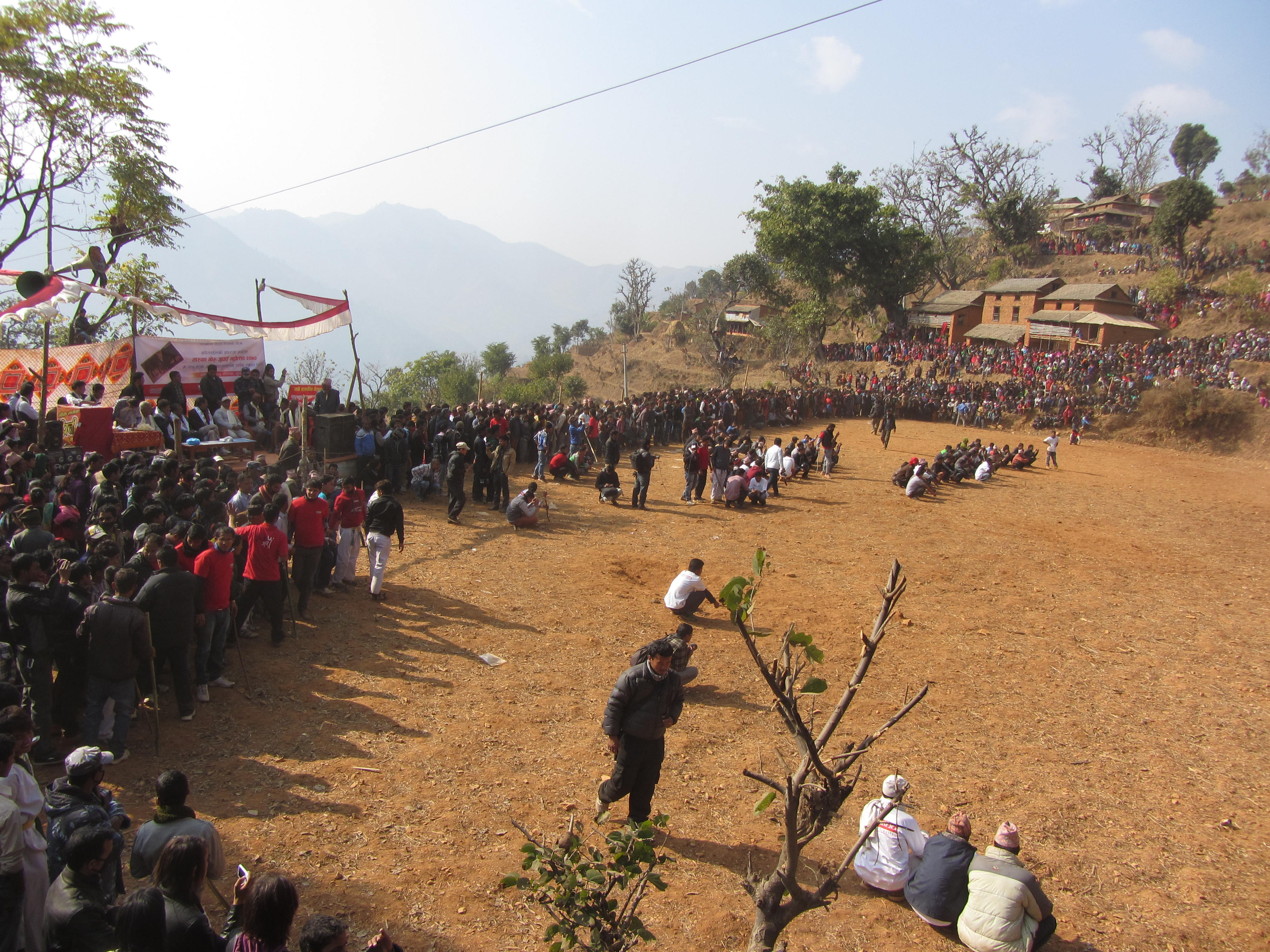
Local festival in winter in Taruka village of Nuwakot District in Nepal

Every year on the day of Maghe Sankranti, in different districts of Nepal, bull wrestling is organized. The oldest and most popular bull wrestling of Nepal is in Taruka, Nuwakot, 75 kilometres (47 mi) away from Kathmandu. It is believed to have started in the early years of the 18th century as source of entertainment for nobles while visiting the village. Many people from around the country visit Taruka to witness this event. Other than Nuwakot bull wrestling is also organized in Dhading and Rasuwa. In the Taruka Bull Feast, fight is fairly conducted between two bulls at a time. Neither men intervene the fighters, nor any harm like piercing or stabbing to provoke the bull is practiced during the entire fight. The bulls are sent into the arena turn by turn and fight against another bull. The fight is controlled by experienced guides, often cattle rearers. The fight continues up to 45 minutes. Whichever bull defeats the counterpart wins.

== Western Asia ==
=== Iran ===
VarzaJang or Gāv-bāzi (bull-play) is a bloodsport organized between bulls in the north of Iran. This wrestling is organized only in Gilan and Mazandaran provinces. Varzajang takes place mainly in Mazandaran in Amol, Noor, Chamestan and Nowshahr and in Gilan in Rudsar, Lahijan, Chaboksar, Rasht and Khomam.

Some researchers, such as Abazar Gholami, Seyed Hashem Mousavi Dizkohi, and Mohammad Jamali, have supported its cultural aspects in their works. However, researcher Hossein Solati has provided a comprehensive phenomenological analysis of this tradition while strongly opposing the euphemistic term "play" (bāzi), arguing it should rightly be called a "war" (jang) due to its inherent violence and animal welfare concerns.

Historically, this practice was common in various parts of Iran such as Shiraz, Isfahan, Kashan, and Tabriz, considered a royal entertainment. Over time, its geographical range has largely narrowed to the rice fields of northern Iran (Gilan province). The northern towns of Khomam, Sangar, and Kuchesfahan are active hubs where locals refer to it as a "game". Notably, Sangar is a village near Rasht historically recognized as one of the core localities for holding Varzajang ceremonies. The French anthropologist Christian Bromberger, who witnessed Varzajang in Gilan, has written about it and expressed a desire for its legalization in Iran. Solati, in his work on bioethics, has criticized Bromberger's simplistic view which overlooks animal rights.

=== Oman and the United Arab Emirates ===
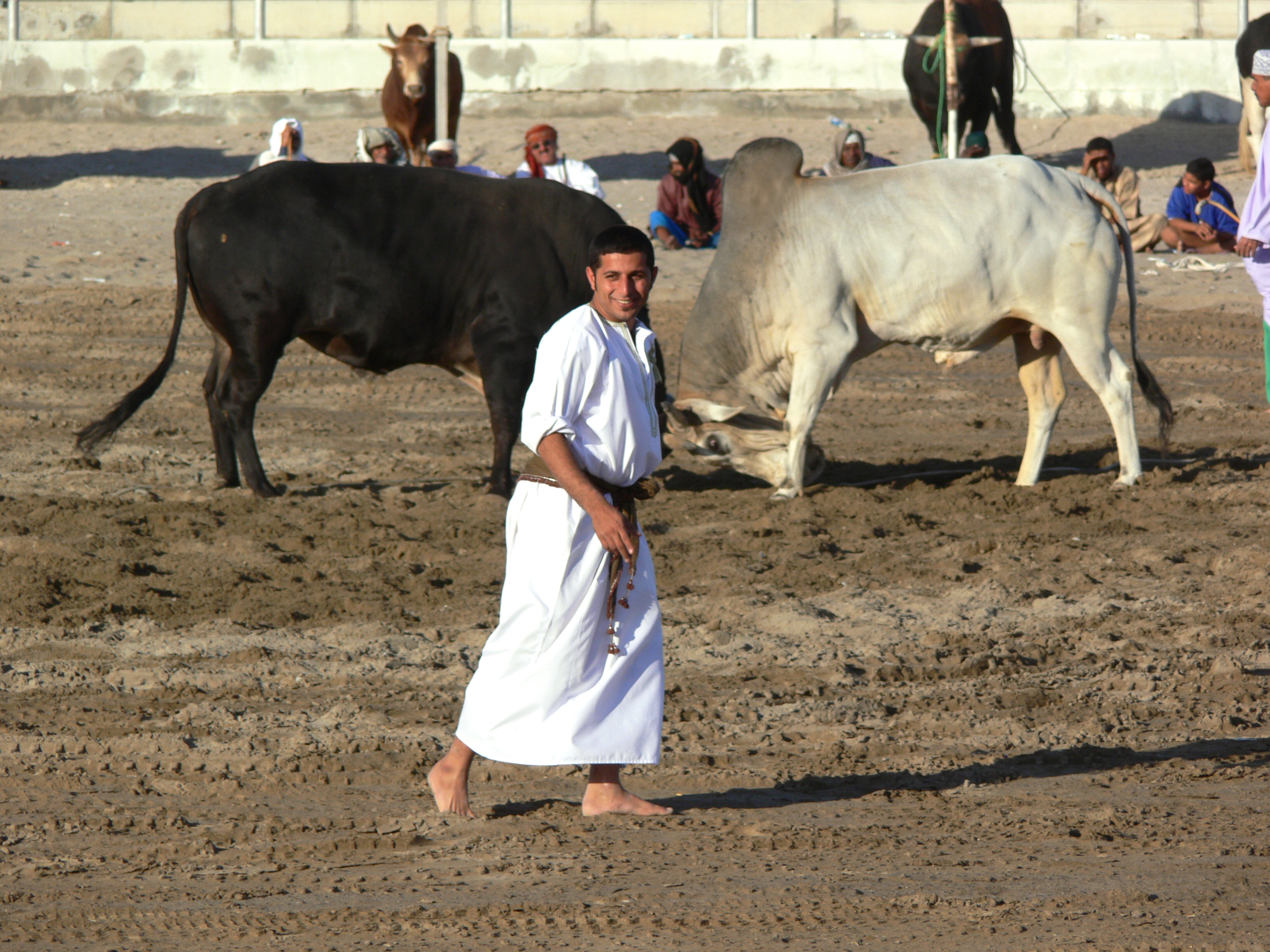
Bullfighting in Oman

In Oman and the United Arab Emirates two Brahman bulls are presented to each other and allowed to lock horns and fight, while their handlers hold ropes to separate them if necessary. The origins of bullfighting in Oman are unknown, though locals presume it was brought here by the Moors who had conquered Spain. Its existence in Oman and the UAE is also attributed to Portugal, which colonized the Omani coastline for nearly two centuries, and also introduced bullfighting to Omani Zanzibar.

=== Turkey ===
Bull wrestling in Turkey is known as boğa güreşi (literally "bull wrestling"). Each year in the third week of June, the Kafkasör (Caucasus) festival takes place in the city of Artvin. At the beginning of the festival, certain rules are applied in order to save the bulls from injury. For example, if a bull retreats from the fight, it means defeat, etc.

== See also ==
- Bull-baiting
- Bullfighting
- Camel wrestling
- Alligator wrestling
- Cockfight
- Combat de Reines, cow wrestling in Switzerland
- Dog fighting
- Horn fighting, the way horned ungulates fight
