= Animals in professional wrestling =

The usage of animals in professional wrestling has varied through the profession's history. Animals that have been used as opponents to humans in matches include bears, tigers, cheetahs and orangutans.

== Species used as wrestlers ==
Terrible Ted with his owner, Dave McKigney

=== Bears ===
Bears have long been a part of professional wrestling. Usually declawed and muzzled, they often wrestled shoot matches against audience members, offered a cash reward if they could pin the bear. They also wrestled professionals in worked, often battle royal or handicap, matches (usually booked so the bear won). Wrestling bears enjoyed their greatest popularity in the Southern United States, during the 1960s and 1970s. The wrestling bear Terrible Ted was used many times for Stampede Wrestling and briefly lived at Stu Hart's home in Calgary while working for Stampede, where Stu's son Bret Hart and his other children would sometimes play with him. Hercules, another celebrated wrestling bear, appeared with Terrible Ted in Maple Leaf Gardens in Toronto. After quitting the sport, Hercules moved to Scotland and took up acting; he appeared in 1983 James Bond movie Octopussy and was named "personality of the year" by the Scottish Tourist Board.

=== Others ===
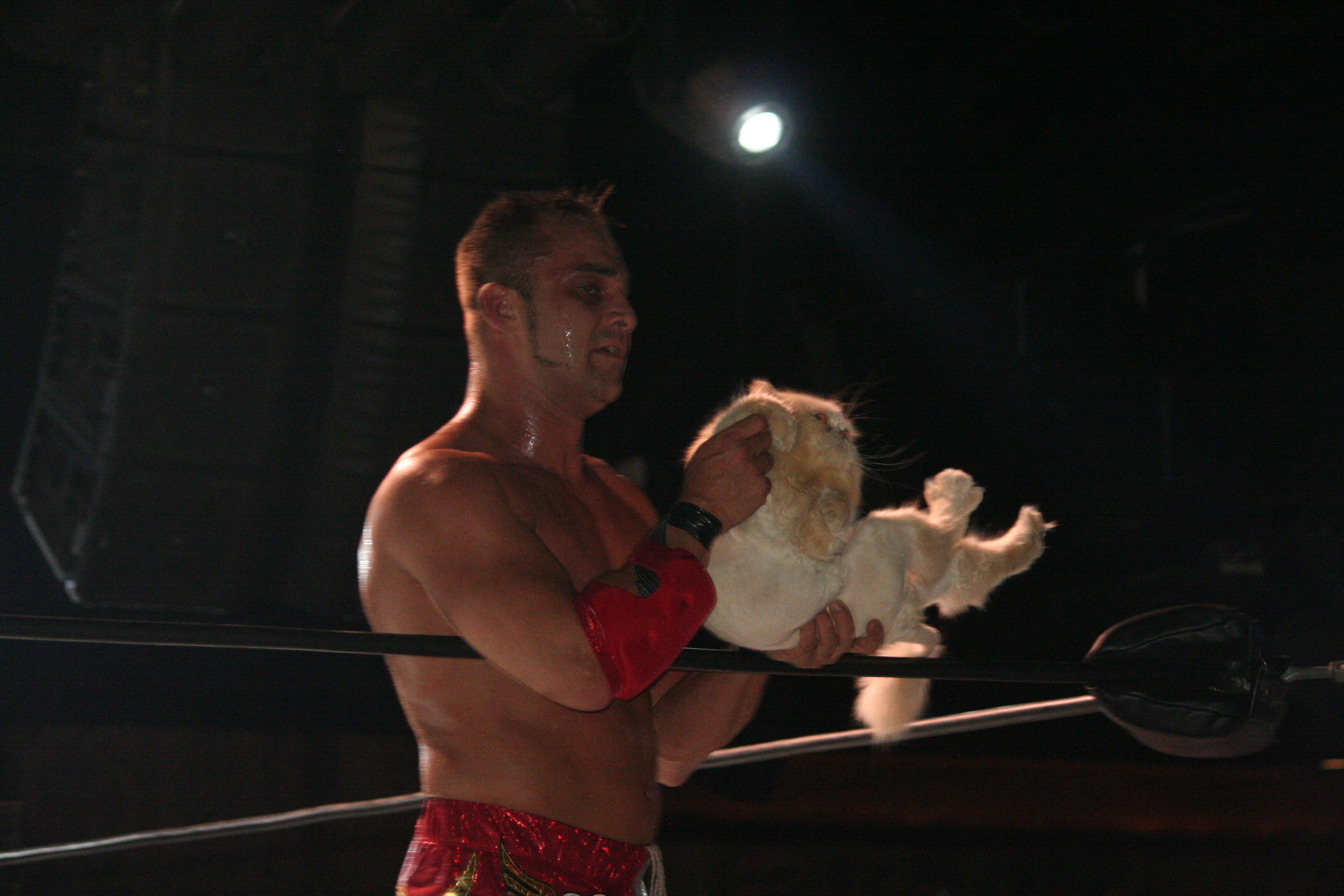
Teddy Hart with his cat Mr. Money in 2015

Wrestling promoter and wrestler Stu Hart would wrestle tigers in his Stampede Wrestling territory. His match with the tiger Sasha "Chi-Chi" was performed partly as a publicity stunt for the Calgary Stampede and was on the behalf of the Calgary Fish and Wildlife Association. Hart's daughter Diana also stated that he had a cheetah who he had borrowed (Note: Hart was close friends with wildlife conservationist and pro wrestlers Al Oeming who owned a Cheetah named Tawana, Oeming and Hart had founded Stampede Wrestling together in the 1940s.) over to their home, the Hart mansion, which he may have planned to wrestle.

WWF champion Bruno Sammartino wrestled an orangutan in a match. The match lasted for fifteen minutes with Sammartino earning 25 dollars for each five minute. Sammartino has expressed that he was under the impression that the ape would be a monkey and that he only took the match because he was relatively desperate for money at the time as a young newly debuted wrestler. He also stated that the match was very painful and unsafe as the animal was not trained to perform.

Teddy Hart, grandson of Stu Hart, has expressed interest in using animals such as cats and dogs in his matches. He has on many occasions brought his cats with him to the ring. On the matter Hart stated:

I'm training cats to come out to the ring with me, and I'm also trying to train animals to get involved in matches. I'm trying to get safety animals, like a dog, to basically pull the referee's leg before the count of three, little things like that. Or my dog will be carrying a weapon for me, and I would get it off his neck. Potentially if I had a female manager, and she has a cat, and the cat is maybe a good way of getting couple kids out of the audience, and I lure the kids out of the audience and the kids cause a disqualification to happen so I don't have to lose the belt, or something like that.

On December 25, 2004, at DDT Pro-Wrestling's Never Mind 2004 event, Shoichi Ichimiya faced a Japanese macaque named Yatchan in a "Man vs. Monkey Mixed Martial Arts Rules Hair vs. Hair match". The match was a single three-minute round and was won by Yatchan by split decision.

== In gimmick matches ==
A "Pig (or Hog) Pen match" is a match that takes place in a pig pen full of pigs, placed near the stage.

In 1999 the Big Boss Man wrestled Al Snow for the WWF Hardcore Championship in a Kennel from Hell match at Unforgiven. The match consisted of a standard steel cage with the cell placed atop it, with the object being that the wrestler would escape from both the cage and cell while trying to avoid guard dogs that were placed between the ring and cell door. This specific match has been called one of the worst gimmick matches in history, as the dogs showed no hostility toward the competitors and proceeded to urinate, defecate and even mate outside the ring.

== Animals as mascots ==
- The tag-team The British Bulldogs consisting of Davey Boy Smith and the Dynamite Kid had a bulldog named Matilda as their mascot. When Smith returned to the WWF in 1991, she was replaced with another bulldog named Winston.
- Jake "The Snake" Roberts had a pet python named Damien who was often involved in feuds and sometimes matches.
- "Birdman" Koko B. Ware came to the ring with a macaw named Frankie.
- Hillbilly Jim brought pigs ringside on occasion.

== Legality ==
As of 2006, bear wrestling is banned in 20 U.S. states.

== See also ==
- Hercules (bear)
- Animals in sports
- Camel wrestling
