= Tōgyū =

Japanese bull wrestling

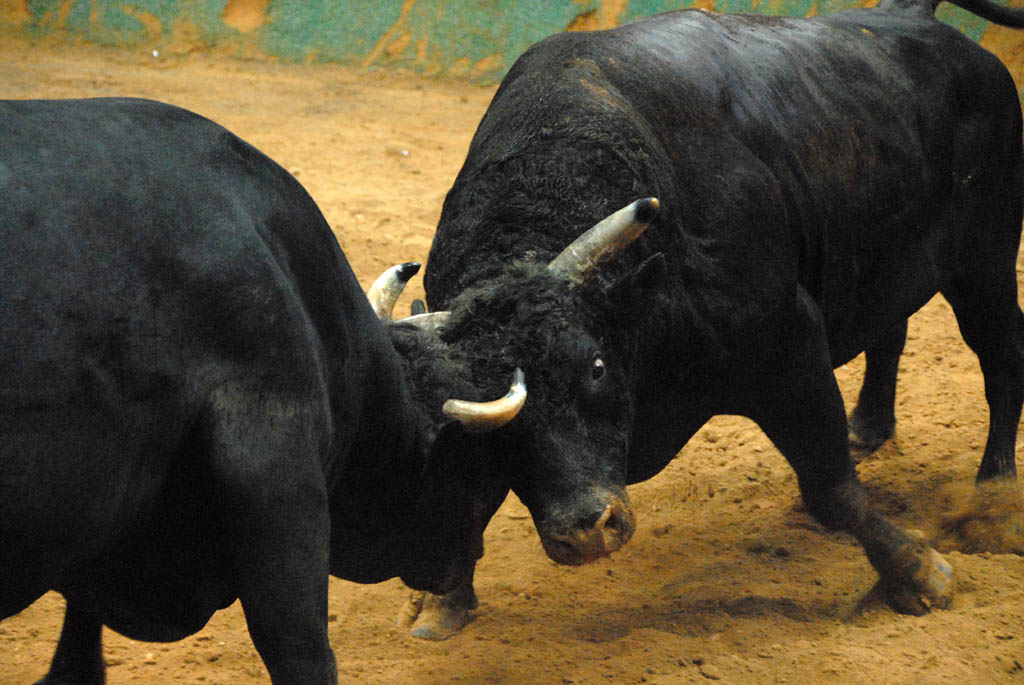
Two bulls beginning a match in Ishikawa, Okinawa

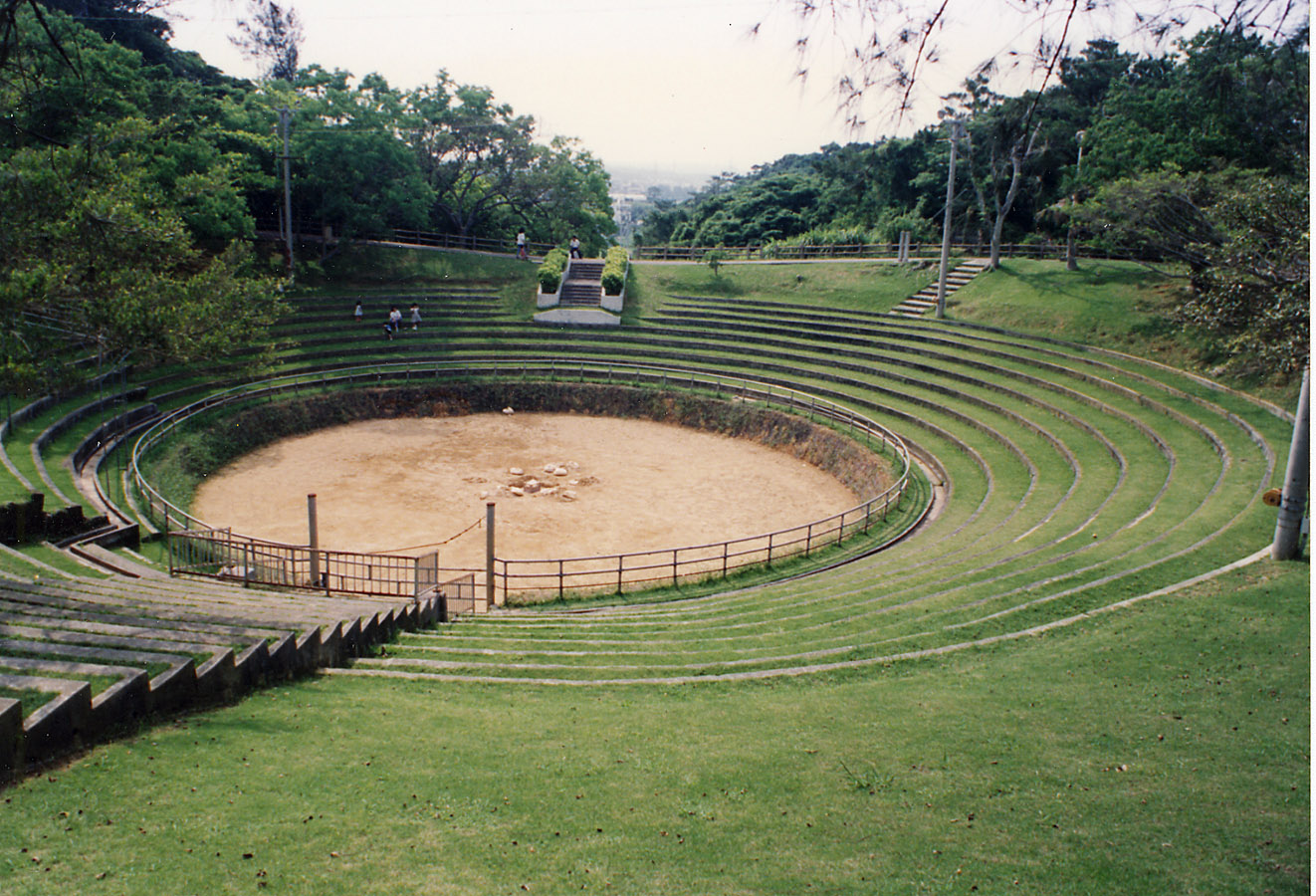
Arena on Okinawa Island

Tōgyū (闘牛), also known as ushi-zumo or bull sumo, is bull wrestling as it is called in Japan. It used to be a traditional annual or seasonal sport by the proud owners of the farming bulls, but it is now held as a spectator sport in various places, such as the prefectures of Iwate, Kagoshima (Amami Islands), Niigata, Okinawa and Shimane (Oki Islands).

Although sometimes known as "Japanese bullfighting", it is drastically different from the Spanish or Portuguese style of bullfighting where the matches are between a bull and a human, with blood being spilt. Tōgyū has more in common with northern Portugal's sport of chegas and the Swiss sport of cow fighting.

During matches, the bulls lock horns and attempt to force each other to give up ground. Each bull has a coach who helps to keep the bulls locked in conflict and encourages their bull to win. The match is over when one of the bulls tires and withdraws, losing the match. The coaches take great care to prevent the bulls from harming each other and the fight is immediately over if one of them accidentally gores the other.

== History ==
The sport started at least as early as the 12th century, with farmers pitting bulls against each other as a fun sport. Although the exact year in which tōgyū was started is not known, the second half of the Meiji period is when it began to get popular throughout Okinawa. In 1907, tōgyū became popular enough in the cities of Itoman, Gushikawa, Katsuren and Yonagusuku to start receiving coverage in local newspapers. During the Shōwa period, prior to the outbreak of World War II, tōgyū reached new heights of popularity. So great was its popularity that a village is said to have banned it because the villagers spent too much time enjoying the fights, instead of working in the fields.

During the Ryukyu Islands campaign of World War II, the fights ceased, as the Ryukyu Islands became a war zone. Only a few months after the war's end on August 14, 1945, the fights began again.

Between 1950 and 1960, rules became codified and conferences became formed in order to organize the events. In 1965, popularity peaked, with one event bringing in 10,000 spectators.

In 2018, organizers of the sport lifted a ban on women entering the ring.

The sport is deeply ingrained in the local culture of the Ryukyu island of Tokunoshima, where bullfights are major cultural events and bull owners use their bulls as markers of social status. Because of the importance of tōgyu in Tokunoshima, the island's mascot and much local iconography is a tōgyu bull.

== Ranking ==
Just as in sumo, bulls are ranked by their ability, with the top position in both sports being known as yokozuna. Similarities continue down the ranking chain as tōgyū has mirrored sumo's ranking terms. Unlike in sumo, there are weight classes and thus lighter bulls are not expected to compete against the heavier ones.

== See also ==
- Bull wrestling
- Camel wrestling
- Cow fighting
- Animal rights
