= Hercules (bear) =

Trained grizzly bear from Scotland

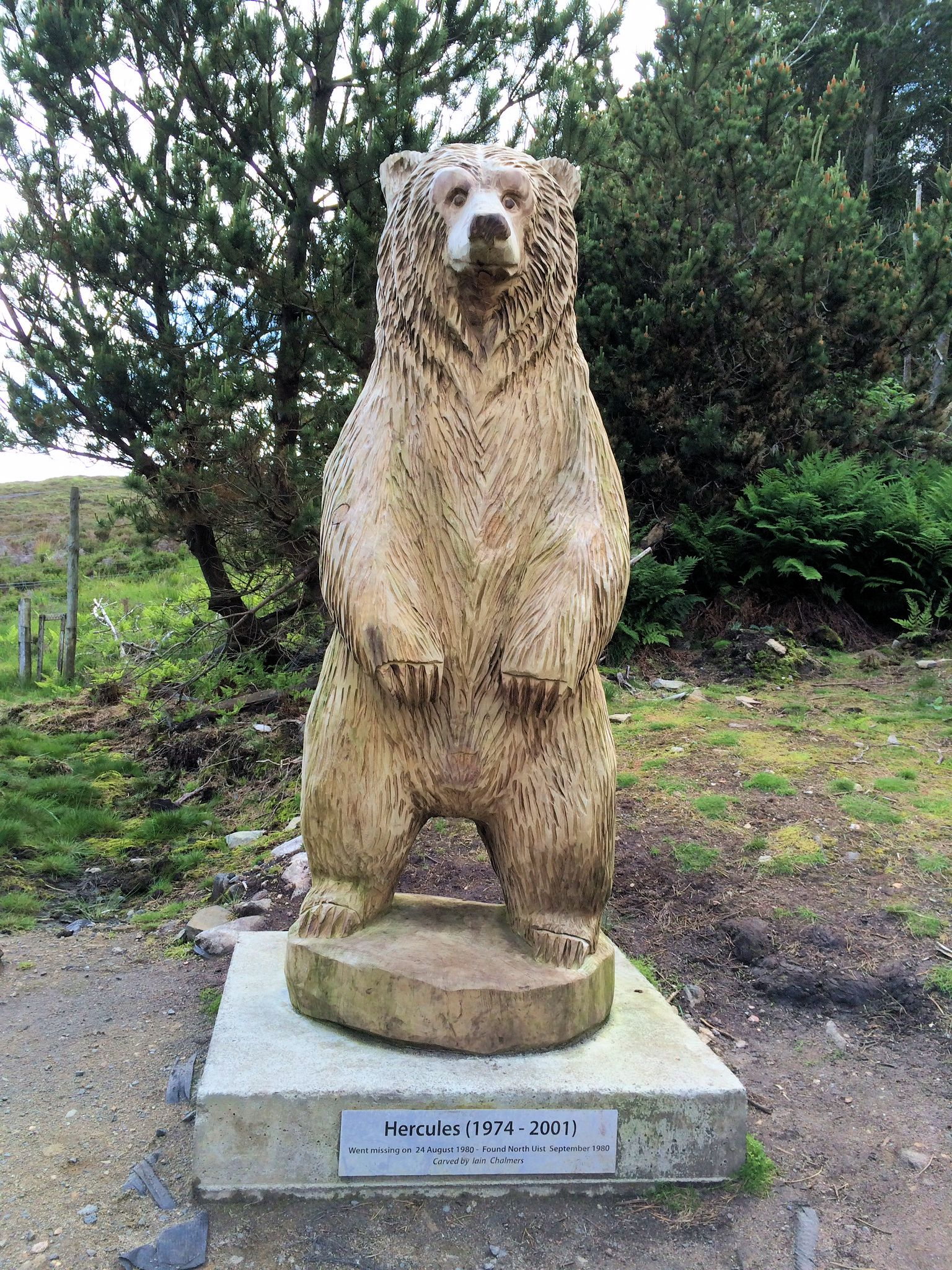
- Statue of Hercules the bear at Langass Woods, Isle of North Uist, Scotland
- Species: Brown bear
- Born: 1974; Scotland
- Died: 4 February 2001 (aged 26–27)
- Occupation: Actor
- Owners: Andy Robin; Maggie Robin
- herculesthebear.com (archived on 17 May 2014)

Hercules (1974 – 4 February 2001) was a trained grizzly bear from Scotland who appeared in a number of cameo roles for various television productions, reaching the height of his popularity in the 1980s.

== Origins ==
Hercules was born in captivity at the Highland Wildlife Park in Kingussie. The park was unable to accommodate more bears, and if the cub could not be rehomed, it would be put down.

Scottish wrestler Andy Robin had appeared on the same card as wrestling bear Terrible Ted in Maple Leaf Gardens in 1965. Learning that the cub was available, Robin and his wife Maggie bought the bear in 1976 for £50, with the idea of training it. In September, with the cub old enough to leave his mother, the couple brought him to their home on Sheriffmuir near Dunblane.

Hercules grew quickly and in one year grew to a weight of 30 stone (190 kg; 420 lbs).

== Early popularity ==
Hercules first appeared with Robin in his act on the UK wrestling circuit in the late 1970s and early 1980s.

Robin commissioned a 60-minute documentary, Hercules the Wrestling Bear in 1980 at a cost of £10,000, designed to promote public interest in their show. It was this which gave Hercules early success, leading to a number of small acting roles on television.

== International stardom ==
While filming for a Kleenex television commercial on Benbecula in the Outer Hebrides on 20 August 1980, Hercules managed to escape, going missing for 24 days. In a rescue attempt joined by hundreds of volunteers, search parties looked for Hercules for three days before calling off the search (though Andy continued to search on his own). On 13 September, a crofter spotted the animal swimming; Herc was shot with a tranquilliser dart, netted, and flown by helicopter back to Andy. The story quickly made Hercules a celebrity around the world, as the world's media gathered around the cage as the bear was brought back to consciousness. Being used to eating cooked food (he disliked raw flesh), the bear had lost 15 stone (95 kg; 210 lbs), almost half his weight. Andy found it quite remarkable that the bear half-starved to death rather than feed on the many sheep, cattle, or various other wildlife on the island. This endeared him all the more, including to all the people who had previously feared him for being a "wild beast", leading him to ever larger celebrity status. This also led to the "Big Softy" Kleenex campaign, which kicked off his film career. For the years following, Herc continued to abandon more of his wild instincts, acting more and more like "a person" with his adoptive "parents".

He would go on to secure higher profile roles in films such as the James Bond movie Octopussy (1983), in which he shared the screen with Roger Moore, and a documentary for the Disney company, as well as moving to California for two years and starring in a number of other small film roles, children's documentaries, and chat shows. All this netted his keepers a small fortune.

== Later life ==
Following the filming of a BBC television documentary, Eyewitness Bear in 1997, Hercules suffered back pain whilst on transit to his home, marking an abrupt end to his career. He was believed to have experienced spinal damage, though no veterinary clinic had a powerful enough x-ray to prove this. Although euthanasia was recommended as a result, Robin nursed him back to health over the next six months, with swimming exercises in Hercules' pool. The determination paid off and he slowly started to walk again - and later x-rays, now more effective, proved that no spinal damage had taken place after all.

In January 2000, Hercules was believed to have developed an abscess - which would reveal itself on the skin. Although antibiotics were given to counter this, Hercules struggled to regain his prior health as he entered a state of torpor as a result of colder weather. He died on 4 February, 2001 aged 25 (which is around the natural lifespan of a grizzly).

In 2013, Andy and Maggie were invited to unveil a life-size statue of Hercules on North Uist.

A documentary, Hercules the Human Bear, aired on Channel 5 on 3 April 2014.

== Trivia ==
- Hercules was featured on the cover of Time and helped to promote the Miss World contest.
- Hercules caddied for comedian Bob Hope at the Scottish golf course of Gleneagles.
- Hercules was once named "Personality of the Year" by the Scottish Tourist Board and received a telegram from Ronald Reagan.
- The Scottish duo "Gaberlunzie" dedicated a song to Hercules on their 2003 album The Travelling Man.
- Hercules was stunt double for Gentle Ben in a charity wrestling match with Geoff Capes

== See also ==
- List of individual bears
