= Grmeč =

Mountain in north-western Bosnia and Herzegovina

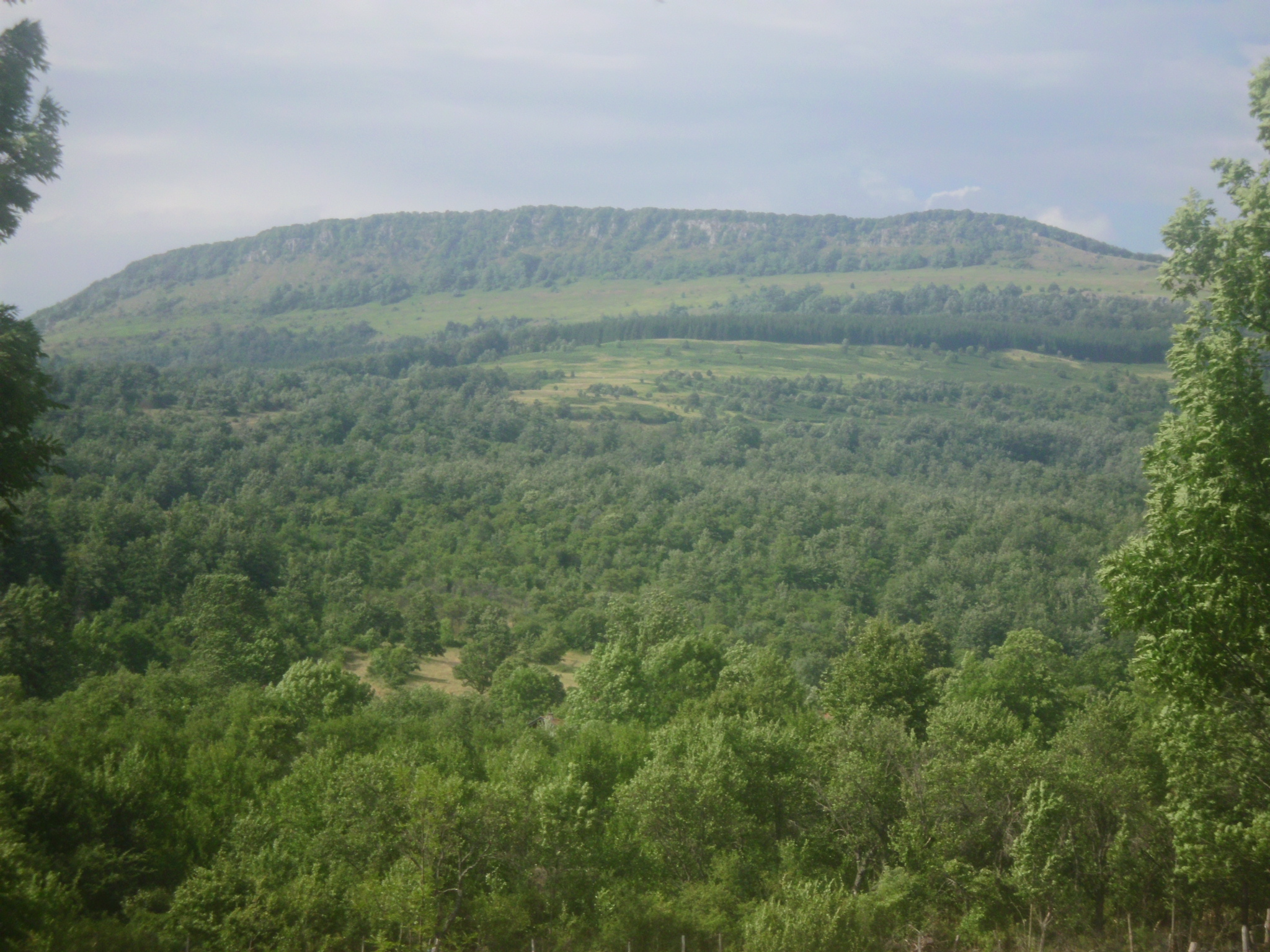
- Željeznik, one of the peaks of Grmeč

Highest point
- Elevation: 1,605 m (5,266 ft)
- Coordinates: 44°40′N 16°27′E

Geography
- Location within Bosnia and Herzegovina
- Location: Bosnia and Herzegovina
- Parent range: Dinaric Alps

Grmeč is a mountain of Dinaric Alps in north-western Bosnia and Herzegovina. It is more than 60 kilometres long, stretching between the city of Bihać and the town of Ključ. The highest peak of Grmeč is Crni vrh ("Black Peak") at 1,605 metres (5,266 ft) above sea level. Grmeč is surrounded by the city of Bihać and the towns of Bosanski Petrovac, Ključ, Sanski Most, and Bosanska Krupa.

Grmeč is the best-known place for bullfights or Bull wrestling in the Balkans. These fights are called the Corrida of Grmeč (Grmečka korida) and have been organised on every first Sunday in August for over 200 years, attracting thousands of visitors. These are fights between bulls themselves and there is no death of a bull. Fights happen in an empty field. The Corrida of Grmeč was depicted by the sculptor Slobodan Pejić. The sculpture of two bulls in a fight, made in bronze in 2004, has been compared to a confrontation of the oppressor and the oppressed or of the Bosnian people and the Austrian Emperor.

== See also ==
- List of mountains in Bosnia and Herzegovina
