= Combat de Reines =

Traditional cow-fighting event in the Swiss canton of Valais

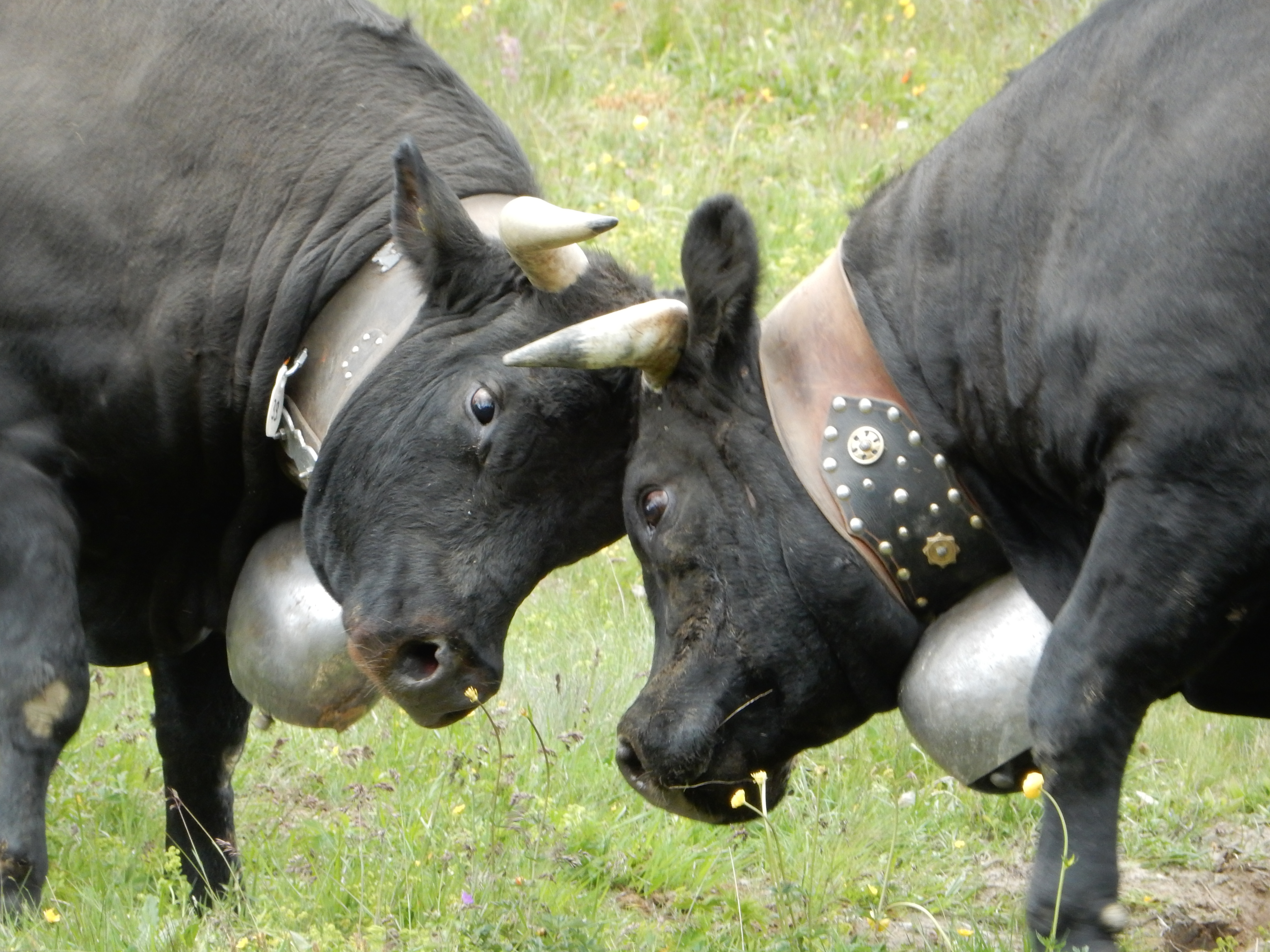
Cow fighting in Vesonnaz

Combat de Reines or Swiss Cow fighting (French: Combat de Reines; Romansh: Combat da reginas) is a traditional event held mostly in the Swiss canton of Valais, in which a cow fights another cow (unlike bullfighting, in which humans fight bulls, often to the death). Each year, the Swiss canton of Valais hosts a series of cow fights known as combats de reines ("queen fights"), which began in the 1920s and has drawn as many as 50,000 spectators in a year. The winner is called La Reine des Reines ("the queen of queens") and increases dramatically in value. At the end of the year, a grand final is held in Aproz, where the six best from seven districts do battle in six weight categories.

Cows naturally fight to determine dominance in the herd, and this is the behaviour that is exploited in cow fighting, using cows from the local Hérens breed. With their horns blunted, the fights are mainly a pushing contest. Any cow that backs down from a fight is eliminated until one cow is left standing in the ring. It sometimes happens that the cows in a fight refuse to engage in physical contact with each other at all. Each fight can last up to 40 minutes.

Similar events take place in Savoie and Haute-Savoie, France, and in the Aosta Valley of Italy.

== See also ==
- Battle of the Queens (Aosta)
- Tōgyū, a similar sport in Okinawa, Japan
