= Dhunge Sanghu Mela =

Festival in Pokhara, Nepal

Dhunge Sanghu Mela (Nepali: ढुंगेसाँघु मेला) is a festival celebrated annually on the day of Maghe Sankranti at Sita Ghat on the bank of Seti River in Pokhara city, Nepal. Hindu pilgrims from Pokhara and neighbouring districts visits the festival. It is believed that the festival has been occurring since the Treta Yuga. The written documentation, however, states the festival has been occurring since 1964 BS.

It is believed that various god and goddess including Shiva, Brahma, Visnu, Yakchya, Gandarva, and Apsara come to observe the festival. Lord Ram and Sita are believed to have come to the Sita ghat during their lifetime.

The festival serves as a marketplace to sell local produce. Mainly, iron utensils are sold in the Mela. The festival is also subject of various pop songs.

== Controversies ==
- In 2076 BS, a controversy started when it was found that the land used for the Mela was illegally sold for a private use.

== See also ==
- List of Melas in Nepal
