= The Wolfman (wrestler) =

Hungarian / Canadian wrestler (c.1935–2016)

Personal information
- Born: Vilmos Farkas c. 1935 Hungary
- Died: January 10, 2016 (aged 80) Toronto, Ontario, Canada

Professional wrestling career
- Ring name(s): Bill Farkas; The Canadian Wolfman; Farkas the Wolfman; The Hungarian Wolfman; Willie Farkas; The Wolfman; Wolfman Farkas
- Billed height: 6 ft 2 in (1.88 m)
- Billed weight: 250 lb (110 kg)
- Billed from: "The Great White North" "The wilds of Canada"
- Trained by: Mikel Scicluna
- Debut: 1962
- Retired: 1980s

Vilmos Farkas (c. 1935 – January 10, 2016) was a Hungarian/Canadian professional wrestler, better known by his ring name, The Wolfman, his very name "Farkas" in Hungarian means 'wolf'. He is best known for his appearances with the World Wide Wrestling Federation, Maple Leaf Wrestling and All Japan Pro Wrestling in the 1970s and 1980s.

== Early Days ==
Vilmos "Willie" Farkas fled the Communist regime in Hungary, settling in Ontario with family in 1956. Farkas worked on a tobacco plantation before a chance meeting with Stu Hart (who convinced him to relocate to Calgary) to train for a career in professional wrestling.

In 1959 Farkas arrived in Calgary where worked in a factory, with a view to training under Stu Hart, but that didn't eventuate as Farkas was arrested after a bar fight and spent 18 months in jail. On release Farkas returned to Ontario in 1962 where he began training with Mikel Scicluna (who also trained Dave McKigney and Waldo Von Erich who were in the same class). After training Farkas traveled the Canadian territories including Stampede Wrestling in Calgary, International Wrestling in Quebec and Frank Tunney's Maple Leaf Wrestling in Toronto.

=== World Wide Wrestling Federation ===
Willie Farkas started wrestling for the WWWF in 1970, initially competing under his real name. After a brief Hawaiian tour for Ed Francis, he returned as The Wolfman, who claimed to be raised by wolves. He was escorted to the ring by his manager Captain Lou Albano, with a chain around his neck, sporting long hair, scruffy beard and furry boots. The Wolfman challenged WWWF Heavyweight champions Bruno Sammartino and Pedro Morales. In 1975 he returned to feud with Pedro Morales and Gorilla Monsoon throughout his stint, this time being managed by Freddie Blassie.

=== All Japan Pro Wrestling ===
Upon leaving the World Wide Wrestling Federation Willie Farkas toured All Japan Pro Wrestling often teaming with Bobo Brazil.

=== Return To Canada ===
On his return from Japan, Farkus became a regular in the Canadian territories wrestling for and Dave McKigney's Big Time Wrestling tours of Ontario and International Wrestling in Montreal where he feuded with The Destroyer. The Wolfman retired in 1988 after the death of his friend and sometime tag team partner "The Bearman" Dave McKigney.

Farkus died in 2016 at age 80 after a long illness.
