= Taruka =

Taruka तारुका
- Village development committee
- Location in Nepal
- Coordinates: 27.87°N 85.01°E
- Country: Nepal
- Zone: Bagmati Zone
- District: Nuwakot District

Population (1991)
  - Total: 4,846
- Time zone: UTC+5:45 (Nepal Time)

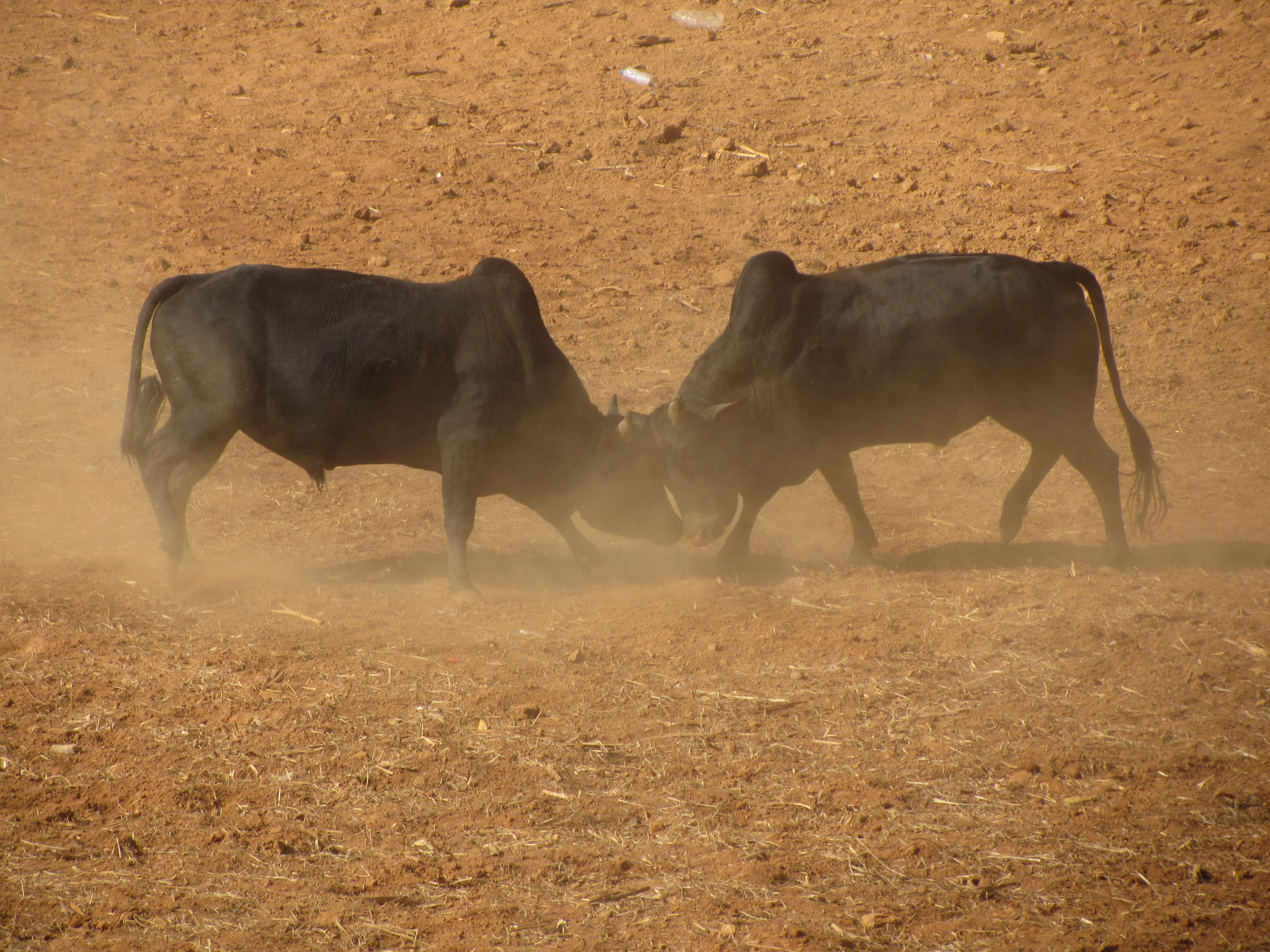
Bullfight in Taruka

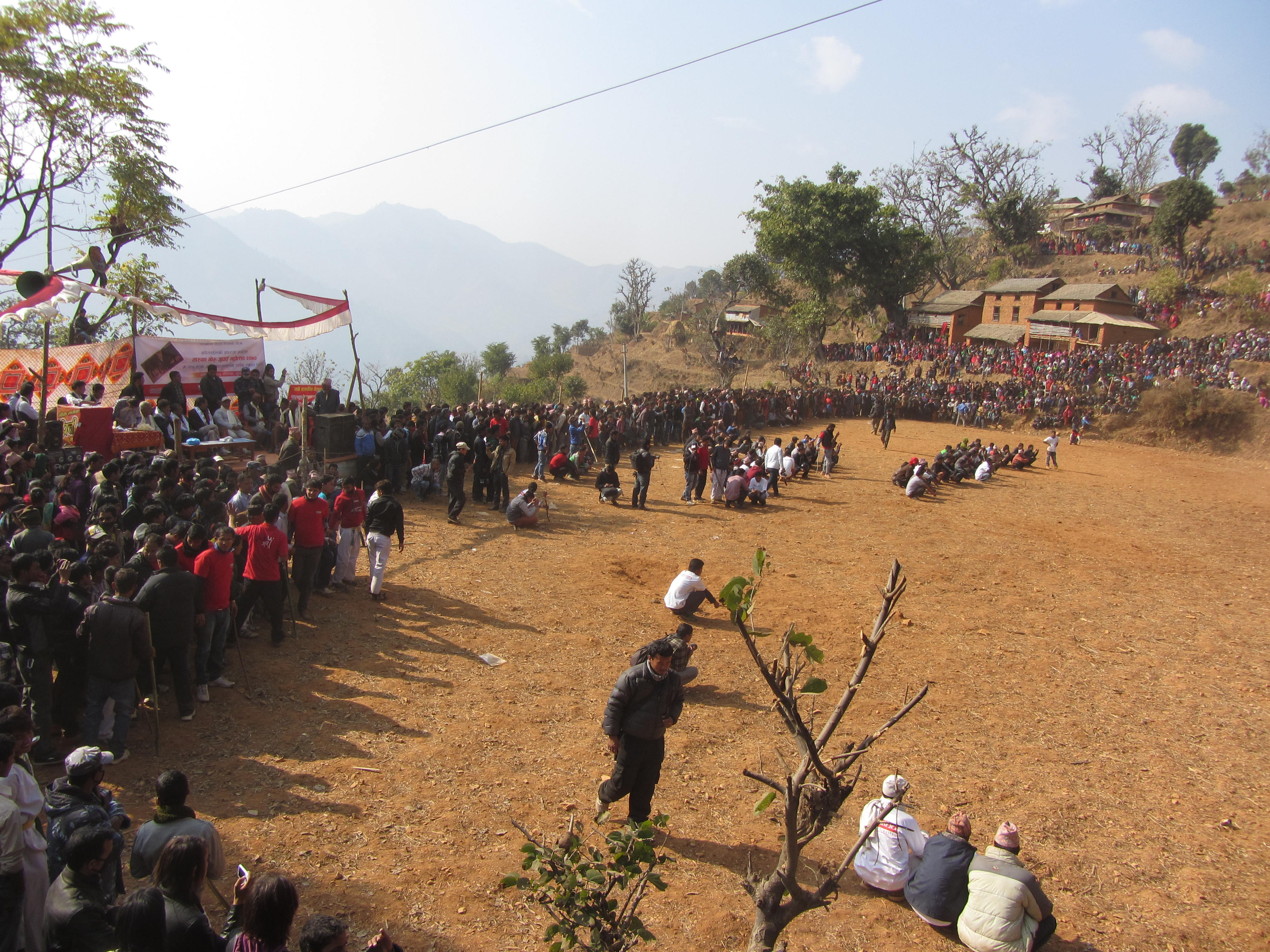
Local festival in winter in Taruka

Taruka was a village development committee in Nuwakot District in the Bagmati Zone of central Nepal. At the time of the 1991 Nepal census it had a population of 4845 people living in 912 individual households. Taruka is famous for its vegetable production and annual bullfight Taruka Bull Feast. The annual bullfight occurs on first day on tenth month (Makar Sakranti) of Nepali calendar.
