= Khadag Bhanjyang =

Khadga Bhanjyang खड्ग भञ्ज्याङ
- Village development committee
- Location in Nepal
- Coordinates: 27.87°N 85.09°E
- Country: Nepal
- Zone: Bagmati Zone
- District: Nuwakot District

Population (1991)
  - Total: 5,971
- Time zone: UTC+5:45 (Nepal Time)

Khadga Bhanjyang was a village development committee in Nuwakot District in the Bagmati Zone of central Nepal. At the time of the 1991 Nepal census it had a population of 5971 people living in 1104 individual households.

== Nepal Flood ==
Recent Debris of Flood has damaged the several coastal area of Trishuli River including Khadkabhanjyag,Bahuhbeshi ,Shirkhali and Dhodeni. Most of the people lost their homes and property .Village Annihilation in Khadga Bhanjyang was positioned directly in the flood path and was almost completely flattened, buried under heavy mud, boulders, and debris.As per media widely covered Structural connections, nearby roads, and vital bridges spanning the Trishuli River were completely swept away.

The powerful surge erased riverbanks entirely, washing away the ground right up to the foundations of surviving buildings. There was the full damaged of Power Grid Ruin at Major regional energy assets were heavily hit, including the nearby Nuwakot Solar Project, which was extensively buried and destroyed
