= Godavari Mela =

Hindu festival occurring every 12 years in Lalitpur, Nepal

- Genre: Pilgrimage
- Dates: On the day Jupiter (Brihaspati) aligned with the Sun, According to Hindu astrology
- Frequency: Every 12 years
- Venue: Godavari Kunda
- Locations: Godavari, Lalitpur district, Nepal
- Country: Nepal
- Previous event: 2015
- Next event: 2027

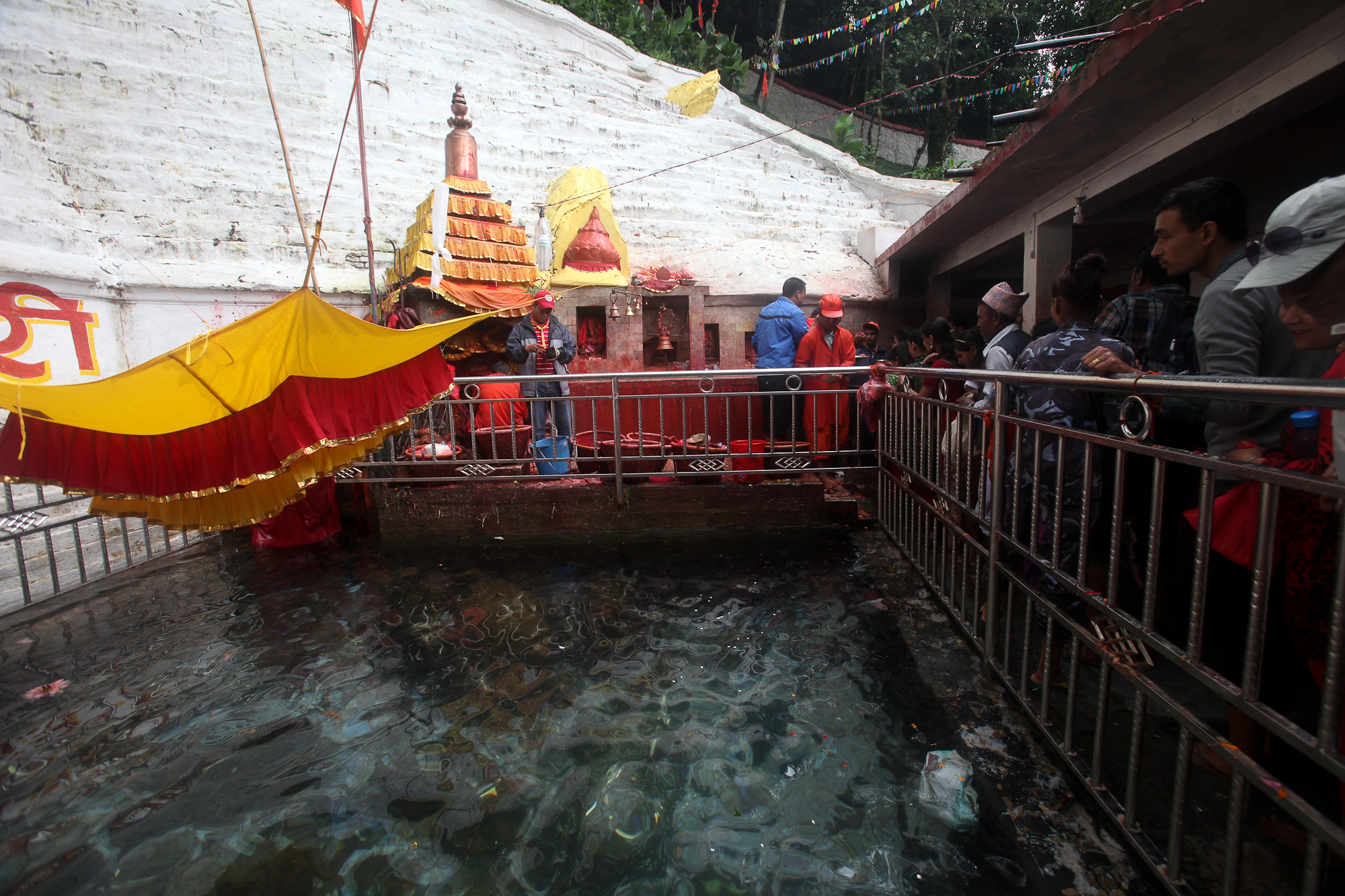
Godawari Mela

Godavari Mela (Nepali: गोदावरी मेला) or Simhastha Mela is a traditional Hindu festival celebrated every 12 years in Godavari, in Lalitpur district of Nepal. The festival attracts Hindu pilgrims from all over Nepal, India and some tourists from other countries. Pilgrims believe that taking a dip in the holy spout during the festival washes away their sins. The festival was started in the Lichhavi period. The festival is celebrated for one month and is visited by millions of people.

== Festival procession ==
The festival begins after priests and devotees leave the Harisiddhi temple in the early morning for Godavari escorted by traditional musical orchestras. The main priest pours milk into the Godavari pond, and take a holy dip. The same is then followed by 28 other priests. The pond has five stone spouts which are believed to have been formed during Samundra manthana and a drop of Amrit (nectar) fell at the Godavari and the other fell in Nasik in India.

Pilgrims visit the Siddeshowr Mahadev and Godavari Ganga temples. During the festival, the road from Patan to Godavari is crowded with buses, people and shops. Local produce are showcased in the stalls. Volunteers, including Scouts and Red-cross manages the festival under the organization committee.

== Mythology ==
According to the mythology, when a Hindu saint named Gautam Rishi (one of the seven great sages) was grazing cattle, one of the cows fell off a cliff and died. The Rishi prayed to Shiva for help. Shiva told him to pray to goddess Ganga. The same night, the goddess appeared in his dream and the next day the Ganga appeared in Godavari, when the Jupiter was aligned with the Sun. The rishi then built the Siddheshwar Temple beside the pond at Godavari Kunda. The aligning of Jupiter and Sun happens every 12 years, hence the festival is also celebrated every 12 years.

== Similar mela ==
A festival is celebrated in Kailali district of Nepal with a similar name. It is called Godavari Amrit Mahasnan Dibya Sahasrha Kumbha Darshan Mela and is celebrated in Maghe Sankranti. More than 500,000 people visit the festival from surrounding districts in Nepal and pilgrims from India. In 2016, President Bidhya Devi Bhandari inaugurated the event.
