= Dave McKigney =

Canadian professional wrestler (1932 – 1988)

- Dave McKigney (right) and Terrible Ted. Autographed by "Gene DuBois", a ring name of McKigney's.

Personal information
- Born: June 9, 1932 Toronto, Ontario, Canada
- Died: July 4, 1988 (aged 56) Lewisporte, Newfoundland, Canada

Professional wrestling career
- Ring name(s): The Bearman; The Canadian Wildman; Jean Dubois; Gene Dubois; Pierre Dubois; Dave Dubois; The Beast
- Billed height: 5 ft 11 in (180 cm)
- Billed weight: 229 lb (104 kg)
- Trained by: Red Garner
- Debut: 1958
- Retired: 1987

Dave McKigney (June 9, 1932 – July 4, 1988) was a Canadian professional wrestler, also known by his ring name, The Bearman. He is best known for wrestling bears and training Terrible Ted. His appearance as a scruffy beard and long hair. He appeared in Canada with Stampede Wrestling and Maple Leaf Wrestling, and across the border for the World Wide Wrestling Federation, in the late 1960s and early 1970s.

== Early life ==
Born in Toronto, Ontario. At age 17, he began wrestling at the amateur wrestling level in the Toronto area. McKigney began training in the early 1950s as he was trained by Red Garner in Southern Ontario.

== Professional wrestling career ==
=== Early career ===
Started wrestling in Toronto for Maple Leaf Wrestling as the "Flying Frenchman' Jacques Dubois. He would start training Terrible Ted, an American black bear, who stood 7' and weighed 600 lbs. Ted was declawed and detoothed, and travelled with a carnival in his early years. When the carnival went bankrupt in the early 1950s, McKigney adopted and trained him. On Boxing Day in 1958, before 8,250 fans, "Terrible" Ted defeated his mentor McKigney at Maple Leaf Gardens in Toronto. He wrestled three more matches for Maple Leaf Wrestling to start 1959, then headed to Stampede Wrestling in Calgary, working Stampede Wrestling's territory across Alberta and Saskatchewan. He also had a couple of matches for Tri-State Sports in Idaho.

With Terrible Ted, McKigney eventually grew his hair out long with a scruffy beard and wrestled under the Bearman and Wildman gimmicks.

=== Canada ===
McKigney was a big name in Canada mainly at Maple Leaf Wrestling in Toronto as the Canadian Wildman. He went to Stu Hart's Stampede Wrestling in Calgary in 1959 and used his name as Gene Dubois, Pierre Dubois and Dave Dubois. MicKigney often teamed with The Wolfman.

On July 13, 1966, McKigney offered $3,000 to anyone who could pin Ted. The challenge was accepted and met by John Szigeti (a 36-year-old welder who wanted the money for truck repairs), who pinned Ted "for maybe 15 seconds" before McKigney pried him free. McKigney and promoter Howard Darvin refused to pay the prize, so Szigeti sued them in May 1968.

He would sometimes wrestle in Japan even defeating Japanese legend Antonio Inoki by disqualification, the United States in Michigan and Ohio. McKigney would wrestle until his death.

=== United States ===
McKigney made appearances in Alabama, Georgia Championship Wrestling, World Wrestling Association and American Wrestling Association. In 1974 while wrestling in the American Wrestling Association, McKigney would lose to a young Roddy Piper.

=== World Wide Wrestling Federation ===
In 1969, McKigney made his debut in the Northeast US for the World Wide Wrestling Federation as Jean Dubois or sometimes spelled Gene Dubois. His biggest victory in WWWF was when he defeated Lou Albano. Dubois would have two titles shots against WWWF Champion Ivan Koloff. He would stay with the company until 1972.

=== Japan ===
In 1975 McKigney had a stint for New Japan Pro-Wrestling where he feuded with Seiji Sakaguchi and Antonio Inoki. His biggest victory was win over Japanese legend Antonio Inoki by disqualification. Inoki got his revenge by defeating the Canadian Wildman.

=== Late career ===
By the late 1970s McKigney wrestled mainly in Toronto and Detroit's Big Time Wrestling into the 1980s.

== Personal life ==
He trained his step-daughter, Rachel Dubois, who wrestled for a brief period in the 1970s.

On July 2, 1978, in Aurora, Ontario, McKigney left the door open on the cage of his second bear, Smokey, while he answered the phone. Smokey entered McKigney's house and mauled his girlfriend, 30-year-old Lynn Orser, to death. As a result, both bears were taken away by the Ontario Humane Society. Smokey showed no signs of rabies as of July 5, but was under a 14-day quarantine. McKigney's only possible explanation was that bears sometimes act unpredictably during mating season.

On July 4, 1988, in Newfoundland, McKigney was driving to a wrestling show with Adrian Adonis (Keith A. Franke, Jr.) and twin brothers William "Mike Kelly" Arko and Victor "Pat Kelly" Arko. Driver Victor Arko swerved to avoid hitting a moose on the Trans-Canada Highway and crashed the van, killing him, Franke and Victor. William was injured but survived. McKigney's son, 8-year-old Davey Jr., witnessed the accident from a following vehicle.

== Championships and accomplishments ==
- Big Bear Promotions
  - North American Heavyweight Title
- Canadian Wrestling Hall of Fame
  - Class of 2016
