= Camel wrestling =

Sport in which two camels wrestle

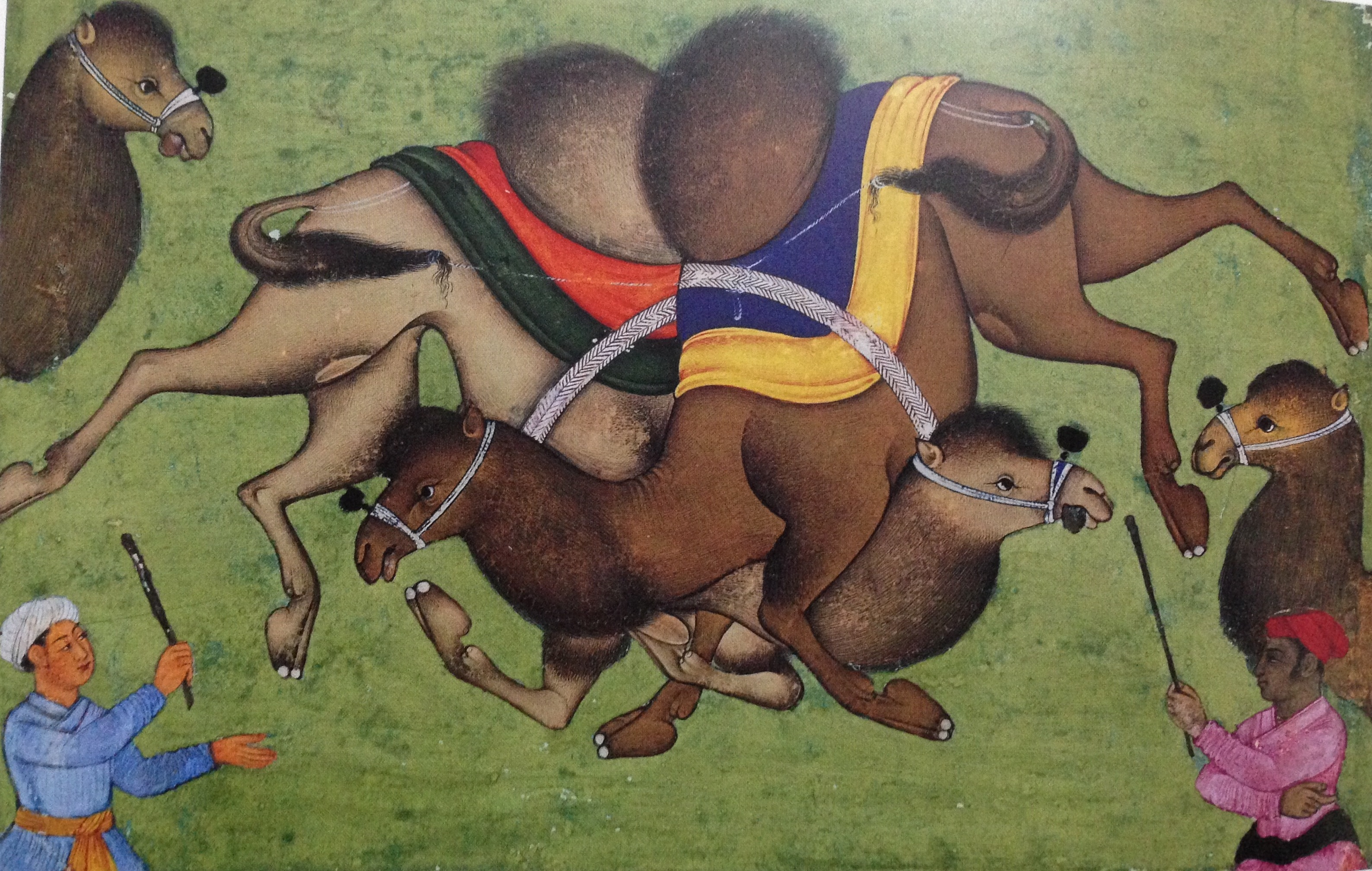
Fighting Camels, Mughal India, c. 1680. Bibliothèque nationale de France, Paris.

Camel wrestling (Turkish: deve güreşi) is a sport in which two male Tülü camels wrestle, typically in response to a female camel in heat being led before them. It is most common in the Aegean region of Turkey, but is also practiced in other parts of the Middle East and South Asia.

== History ==
Camel fighting originated among ancient Turkic tribes over 1000 years ago. Camels also wrestle in the wild, so the practice occurred before it was first organized by nomads. In the 1920s the Turkish National Aviation league held Camel fights as fundraisers in order to purchase planes for the Government of Turkey. The government of Turkey began discouraging the practice in the 1920s, however, characterizing it as too backward of a practice. In the 1980s, the new government of Turkey began encouraging the competitions as part of Turkey's historic culture.

== Event details ==
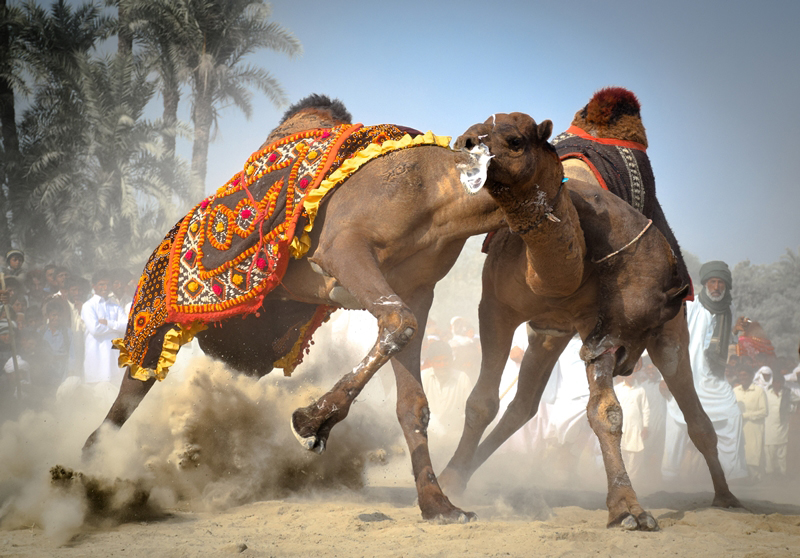

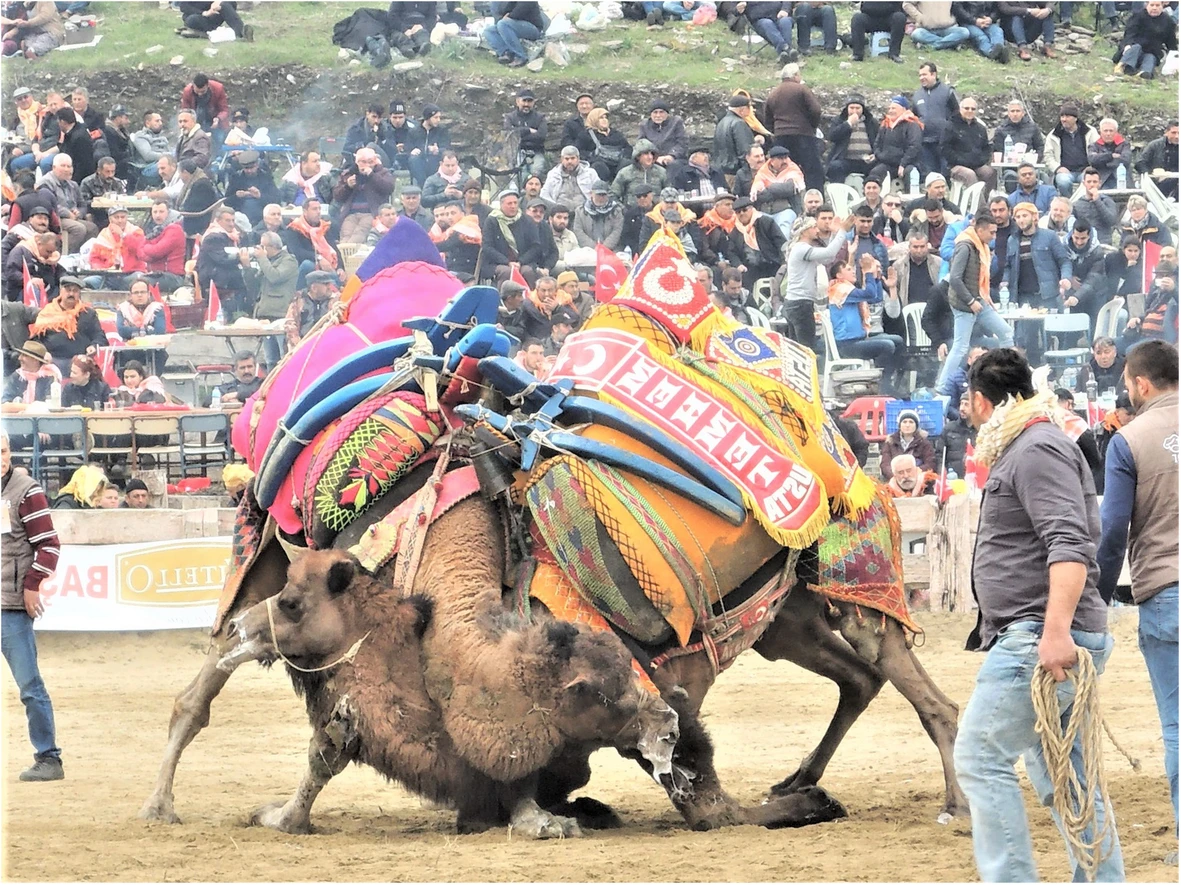
Camel wrestling in Turkey in 2018

Due to the motivating factor of a nearby female camel, the events have historically been held during mating season. The camels fight by using their necks as leverage to force their opponent to fall down. A camel is declared the winner if his competitor falls to the ground or flees from the fight. Most fighting camels are bred in Iran or Afghanistan. A successful camel can be sold for over $20,000.

The events can occasionally be hazardous to spectators if the camels attempt to flee through the crowd. On some occasions fights also break out between the owners of camels.

There are roughly thirty annual festivals in Aegean Turkey each year from November to March. Roughly one hundred fighting camels take part in these events, with each camel competing in approximately ten matches. Events always occur on Sundays in football stadiums and typically last ten minutes each. At the end of the season there is often a tournament of champions in which the best camels compete. Many international tourists attend the events, making them a key part of the tourist industry in Western Anatolia.

== Animal rights ==
Several animal rights organizations have criticized the practice, characterizing it as cruelty to animals.

== See also ==
- Alligator wrestling
- Bull wrestling
- Animals in professional wrestling
