= Terrible Ted (bear) =

Black bear active as professional wrestler

- Terrible Ted with his trainer and manager Dave McKigney. Autographed by "Gene DuBois", a ring name of McKigney's.

Personal information
- Born: 1949 or 1950 Gaspé Peninsula, Quebec, Canada

Professional wrestling career
- Ring name: The Wrestling Bear
- Billed height: 7 ft 0 in (2.13 m)
- Billed weight: 600 lb (270 kg)
- Trained by: Dave McKigney
- Debut: 1950
- Retired: 1975

Terrible Ted (born 1949 or 1950) was a Canadian American black bear who wrestled in various North American promotions from the 1950s into the 1970s.

== Wrestling ==
Ted debuted on April 1, 1950, as "Ted the Wrestling Bear", defeating Tony Galento in Asbury Park, New Jersey. A rematch on May 3, for Clarence Luttral's Florida territory (which later became Championship Wrestling from Florida) in Coral Gables, ended without a winner. A third and final match happened on June 11, in Marion, Ohio; the result is unknown. There is a strong possibility that these matches involved a different, similarly named bear: McKigney said Ted was 19 on August 20, 1969, which would make him six months old, at most, in the first Galeno match. Bears of that age typically weigh less than 100 pounds (45 kg).

Ted then took a long hiatus from wrestling. During this time, Dave McKigney (also known as Gene/Jean DeBois/DuBois, The Beast and The Canadian Wildman) adopted and trained him. On Boxing Day in 1958, before 8,250 fans, "Terrible" Ted, as he was now known, defeated McKigney at Maple Leaf Gardens in Toronto. He wrestled three more matches for Maple Leaf Wrestling to start 1959, then appeared for Stampede Wrestling across Alberta and Saskatchewan. He also had a couple of matches for Tri-State Sports in Idaho.

In 1959, The Leader-Post reported that Ted had won all of over 500 matches in his five-year career to that point. In 1960–61, Ted wrestled primarily in the southern United States, losing only twice in 24 matches, to Gypsy Joe and Man Mountain Managoff. On May 6, 1960, he won an 8-on-1 handicap match over a team including NWA Hall of Famer Angelo Savoldi and Don Kent.

After a hiatus, Ted returned to Maple Leaf Gardens on August 13, 1964, again defeating his trainer, Gene DeBois. He wrestled twice more at The Gardens in December, first winning a rematch with DeBois, then pinning Skunkman on New Year's Eve. After winning a couple of bouts in 1965 for Georgia Championship Wrestling, Ted wrestled for most of the rest of the 1960s in Ontario and Alberta. On Christmas Day in 1969, he returned to the United States to wrestle an exhibition match with Debois in Cleveland, Ohio.

On October 15, 1971, Ted made his World Wide Wrestling Federation (WWWF) debut against The Beast at the Pittsburgh Civic Arena. Earlier that year, he wrestled for the first time in the Maritimes (Halifax) and California (where he defeated future WWWF Champion, Superstar Billy Graham).

In 1972, during his stint in Roy Shire's San Francisco territory, Ted teamed with future WWF Tag Team Champion and Hall of Famer, Rocky Johnson, to defeat Luke Graham and Fritz von Goering. In December, he defeated Bobby Heenan (another WWE Hall of Famer) and Baron von Raschke (a St. Louis Hall of Famer) in a handicap match for the World Wrestling Association (WWA).

He continued wrestling for the WWA and San Francisco in 1973, during which time he faced his first female opponent, Tanya West. He defeated her by countout on November 12 then, four days later, beat her team in a six-person mixed tag match. In December, he returned to the Mid-America territory, defeating Tony Santos in Nashville, Tennessee, on December 26.

Ted's last known match was against McKigney on March 29, 1975, in Akron, Ohio.

== Life ==
Ted was declawed and detoothed, and travelled with a carnival in his early years. When the carnival went bankrupt in the early 1950s, he was adopted by Dave McKigney. Later, he was joined by another bear, Smokey.

On July 13, 1966, McKigney offered $3,000 to anyone who could pin Ted. The challenge was accepted and met by John Szigeti, a 36-year-old welder who wanted the money for truck repairs, who pinned Ted "for maybe 15 seconds" before McKigney pried him free. McKigney and promoter Howard Darvin refused to pay the prize, so Szigeti sued them in May 1968.

In October 1970, Ted spent several days in the Lowndes County jail. McKigney had offered a $1,500 prize to anyone who would wrestle Ted, which was accepted by a 350-pound (160 kg) construction worker named Ed Williams. Before the match, McKigney informed Williams that Ted had recently developed a poor disposition and could be dangerous, and so cancelled the match. Williams accused him of skipping out on the deal, and signed a writ of attachment. Ted was held as security, and later released on $3,000 bail and McKigney's promise to appear in court.

Ted briefly lived at Stu Hart's home in Calgary while working for Stampede, where a young Bret Hart would let him lick ice cream off his feet.

On July 2, 1978, in Aurora, Ontario, McKigney left Smokey's cage door open while he was gardening. Smokey entered McKigney's house and mauled his girlfriend, 30-year-old Lynn Orser, to death. As a result, both bears were taken away by the Ontario Humane Society. Smokey showed no signs of rabies as of July 5, but was under a 14-day quarantine. McKigney's only possible explanation was that bears sometimes act unpredictably during mating season. Their fate is uncertain.

In July 1988, in Newfoundland, McKigney was driving to a wrestling show with Adrian Adonis and William and Victor Arko. He swerved to avoid hitting a moose on the Trans-Canada Highway and crashed the van, killing himself, Adonis and Victor Arko and injuring William Arko.

== See also ==
- Animals in professional wrestling
- List of individual bears
