= Alligator wrestling =

Sport in the United States

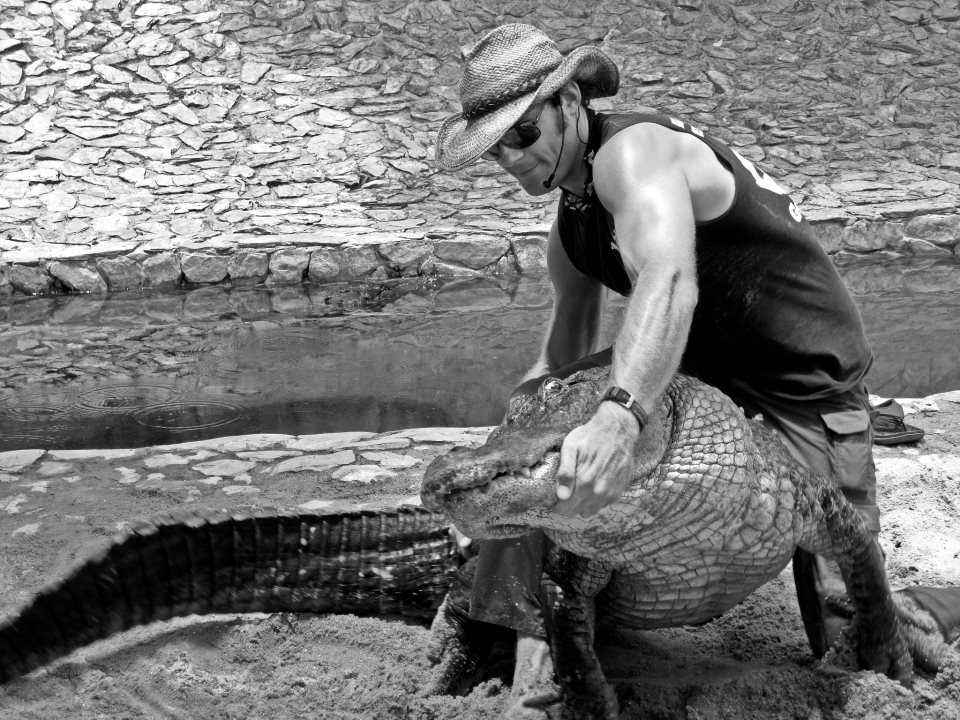
Chris Gillette wrestling an American alligator at Everglades Holiday Park, Ft. Lauderdale, Florida

Alligator wrestling is an attraction, that later evolved into a sport, that began as hunting expeditions by Native Americans. It has been described as "alligator capturing techniques."

== Native American historical origins ==
Southeastern Native Americans hunted alligators as a food source for thousands of years. At the turn of the 20th century, showing off alligators as roadside attractions helped Native Americans generate revenue. Long before the first Europeans explorers wandered into the Florida Everglades, alligator wrestling existed. For tribes like the Seminole and Miccosukee, learning how to "handle" the reptiles was part of their existence.

We had to live off whatever Mother Nature provided us in the Everglades ... We'd eat the tail, the meaty part. Later on, when the alligator skin had a value, we would hunt and skin the gators and bring the skin to trading posts and trade for things we couldn't grow.

— Max Osceola, a Seminole tribal councilman.

== In Florida ==
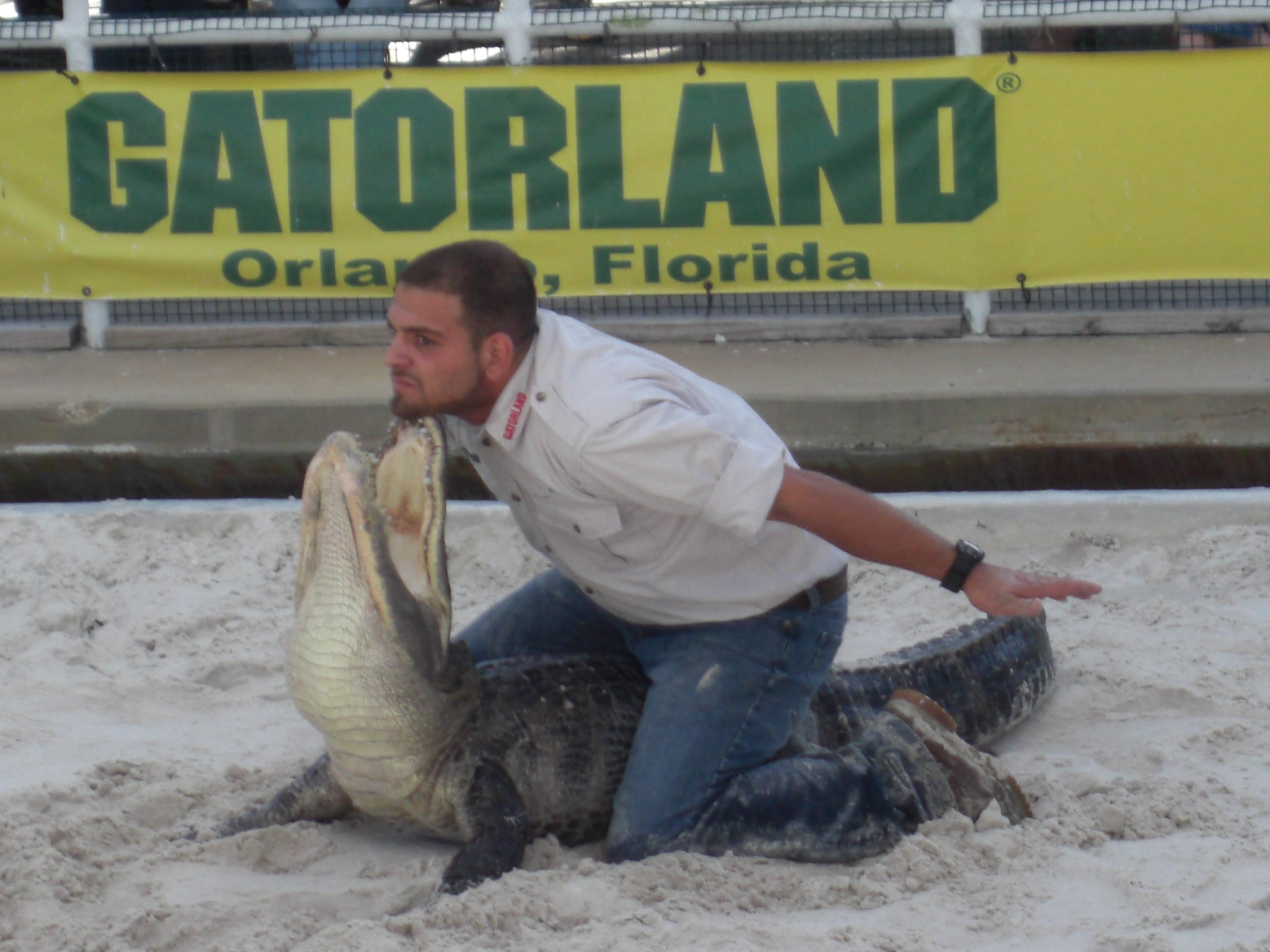
Alligator wrestling at Gatorland

A common symbol of Florida in popular culture is the American alligator (Alligator mississippiensis). The St. Augustine Alligator Farm was one of Florida's earliest themed tourist attractions that opened for business in 1893. At the St. Augustine Alligator Farm and other tourist attractions such as Gatorland and Silver Springs, "taming" or hypnotizing alligators was a popular trick, along with other performances such as alligator wrestling. Alligator wrestling is a common spectator activity for people to do in Florida and is most common near the Everglades' so-called “Alligator Alley”.

== See also ==
- American alligator
- List of fatal alligator attacks in the United States
- Camel wrestling
