= Taruka Bull Feast =

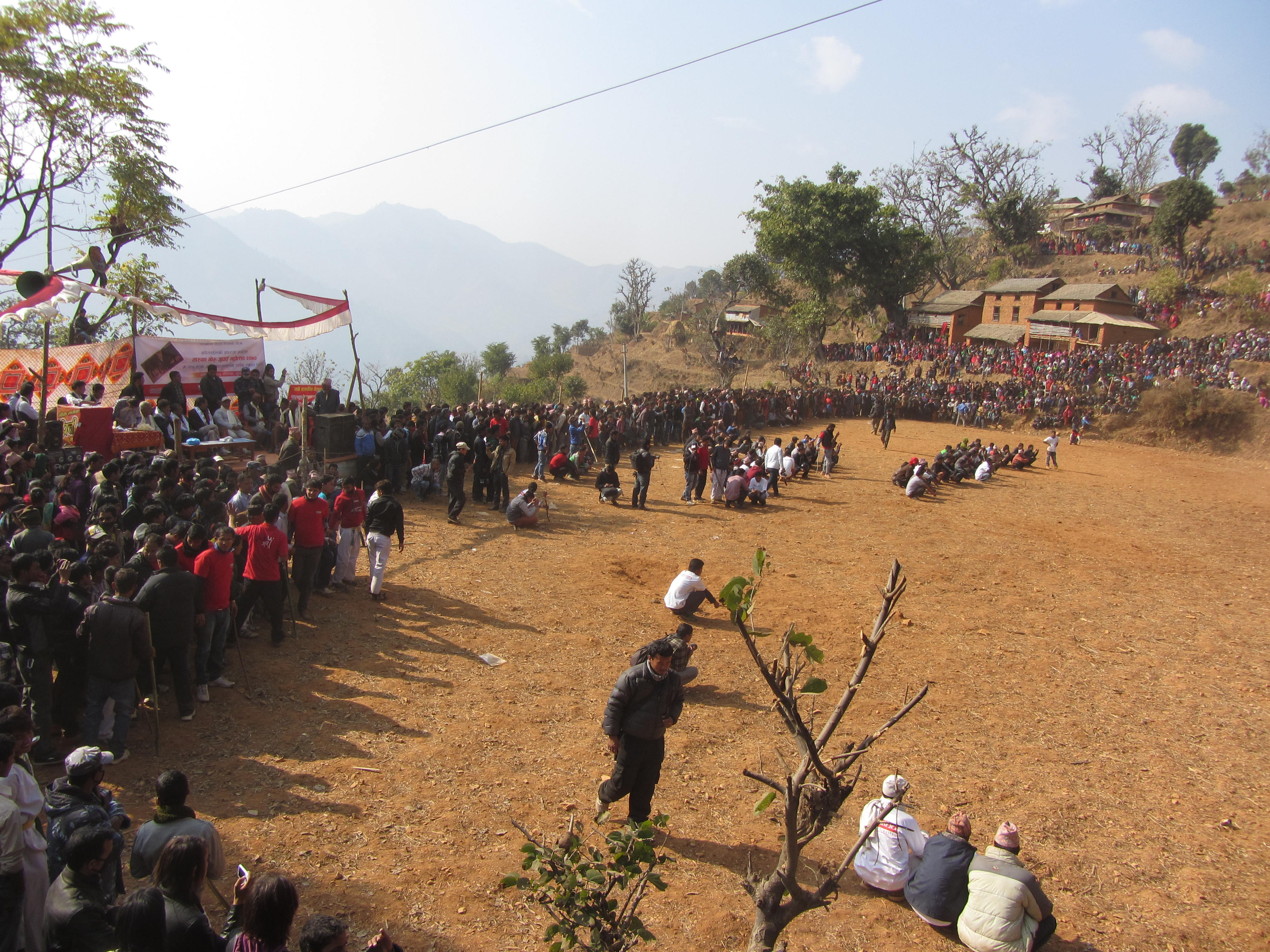
- Spectators of Taruka Bull Fair
- Official name: Taruka Goru Mela
- Type: Cultural
- Celebrations: Maghe Sankranti
- Begins: 1st Magh (Nepali Calendar)
- Frequency: Annual
- Related to: Nuwakot district in Nepal

Taruka Bull Feast (Nepali तारूका गोरू मेला) is a bull stamina show organized in Taruka village of Nuwakot district in Nepal. It is held on Maghe Sankranti, on the first day of Magh according to the Nepali Calendar each year. The winter entertainment feast organized in a rural village 76 Kilometers away from the capital Kathmandu is observed by more than 20,000 spectators.

People prepare their oxen feeding them rich diet whole year to tend its stamina. Bull owners feed their bulls with nutritious foods like coconut, rice flours, oil and eggs, grains like cereals, rice, lentils and fodders of their choice. As supplements they feed with vitamins hoping that will increase stamina for fighting. They train their pets for months building up with mock fights in meadows to ensure that he will get victory in the next feast. 27 pair of bulls contested in the fair of 2021.

== The fight ==
The fight is fairly conducted between two bulls at a time. Neither men intervene the fighters, nor any harm like piercing or stabbing to provoke the bull is practiced during the entire fight. The bulls are sent into the arena turn by turn and fight against another bull. The fight is controlled by experienced guides often cattle rearers. The fight continues upto 45 minutes. Whichever bull defeats the counterpart wins.

== History ==
The history of bullfight believed to take place for the first time more than 200 years ago when the King Jaya Prithvi Bahadur Singh, a monarch of the ancient Bajhang Kingdom visited Nuwakot in 1887. The feast was organized in order to entertain the guest King. Local residents believe that this tradition has developed in a special form with the development of the tradition of farmers celebrating Maghe Sankranti during their leisure time.

People from different parts of the country visit Nuwakot to observe the feast. Mostly from neighbouring districts Dhading, Rasuwa, Kathmandu, Lamjung and Chitwan. A mentionable number of foreigh spectators also observe the fair in recent years. The winner bags cash prise of Rs 25 Thousand along with the defeated ox as well.
