= Tux-Zillertal =

Breed of cattle

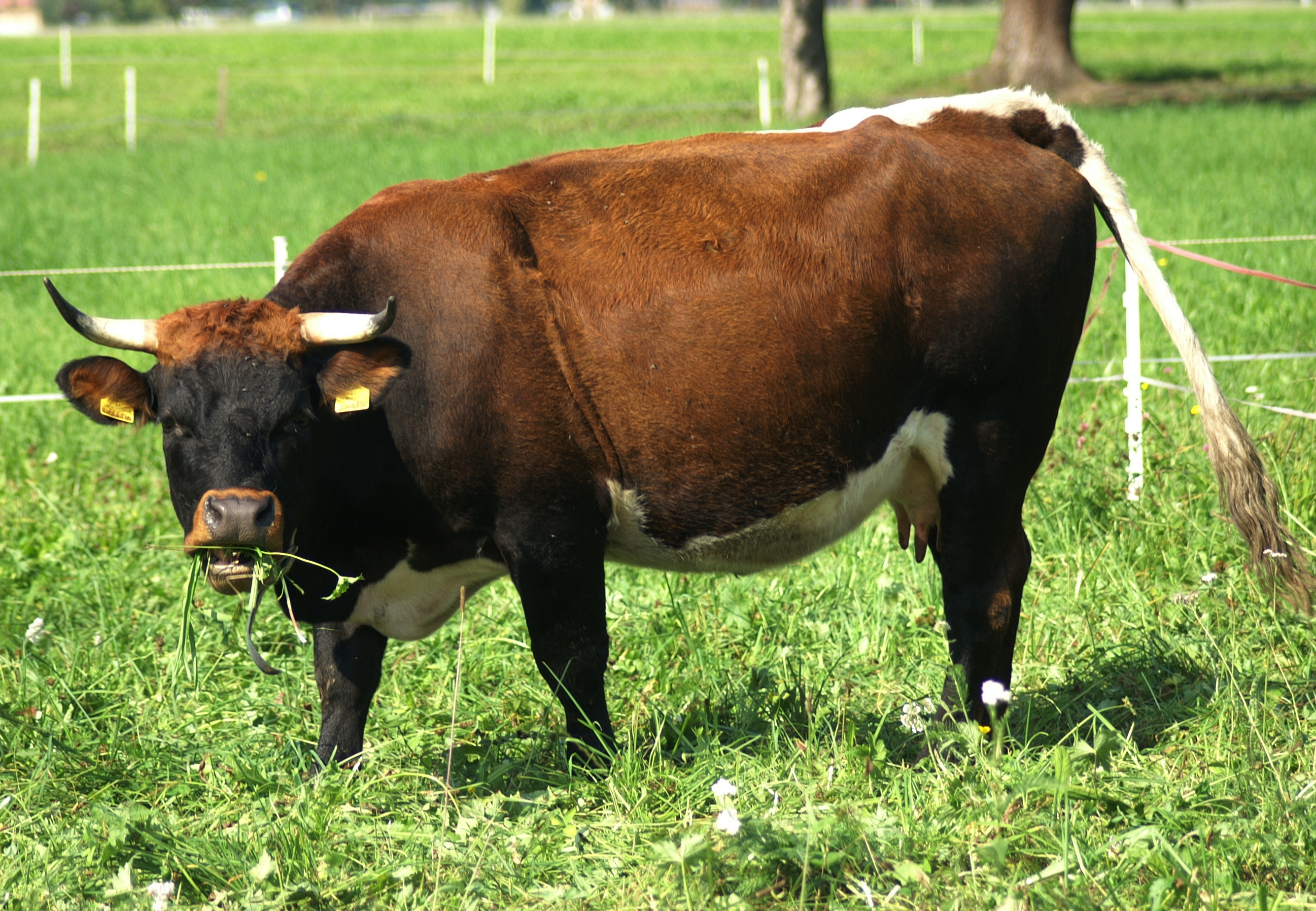
- Other names: Tux-Zillertaler; Tux; Tuxer; Zillertal; Zillertaler; Tirolese; Tyrolean
- Country of origin: Austria
- Distribution: Zillertal, Tirol
- Use: formerly cow-fighting; now meat, vegetation management

Traits
- Weight: Male: 1100 kg; Female: 600 kg
- Height: Male: 130 cm; Female: 125 cm
- Skin color: dark
- Coat: red or black
- Horn status: horned in both sexes
- Cattle; Bos (primigenius) taurus

The Tux-Zillertal, German: Tux-Zillertaler, is an endangered Austrian breed of domestic cattle. It was created in 1982 when two similar Alpine breeds, the Tux and the Zillertal, were merged. The two names derive from those of the municipality of Tux in the Tuxertal, and of the neighbouring Zillertal, both in the Tirol region of Austria. The Tux-Zillertal may derive from the Swiss Hérens breed. Like the Hérens, it was long selected for the fighting ability of the cows, at the expense of productive characteristics.

== History ==
The Tux-Zillertaler breed was created in 1982 by merging the remaining populations of the two similar Alpine breeds, the Tux and the Zillertal. Both breeds are similar to the Hérens breed of Switzerland, and are sometimes thought to have derived from it. The Tux breed was formerly common in Tyrol and in other parts of Austria. Today it is kept mainly in the Zillertal. In 1930 there were some 4500 head. By 1970 the number had fallen to 30, and systematic conservation efforts were begun. A study in 2002 found a total population of 471 head In 2014 a population of 1117–2500 was reported.

== Characteristics ==
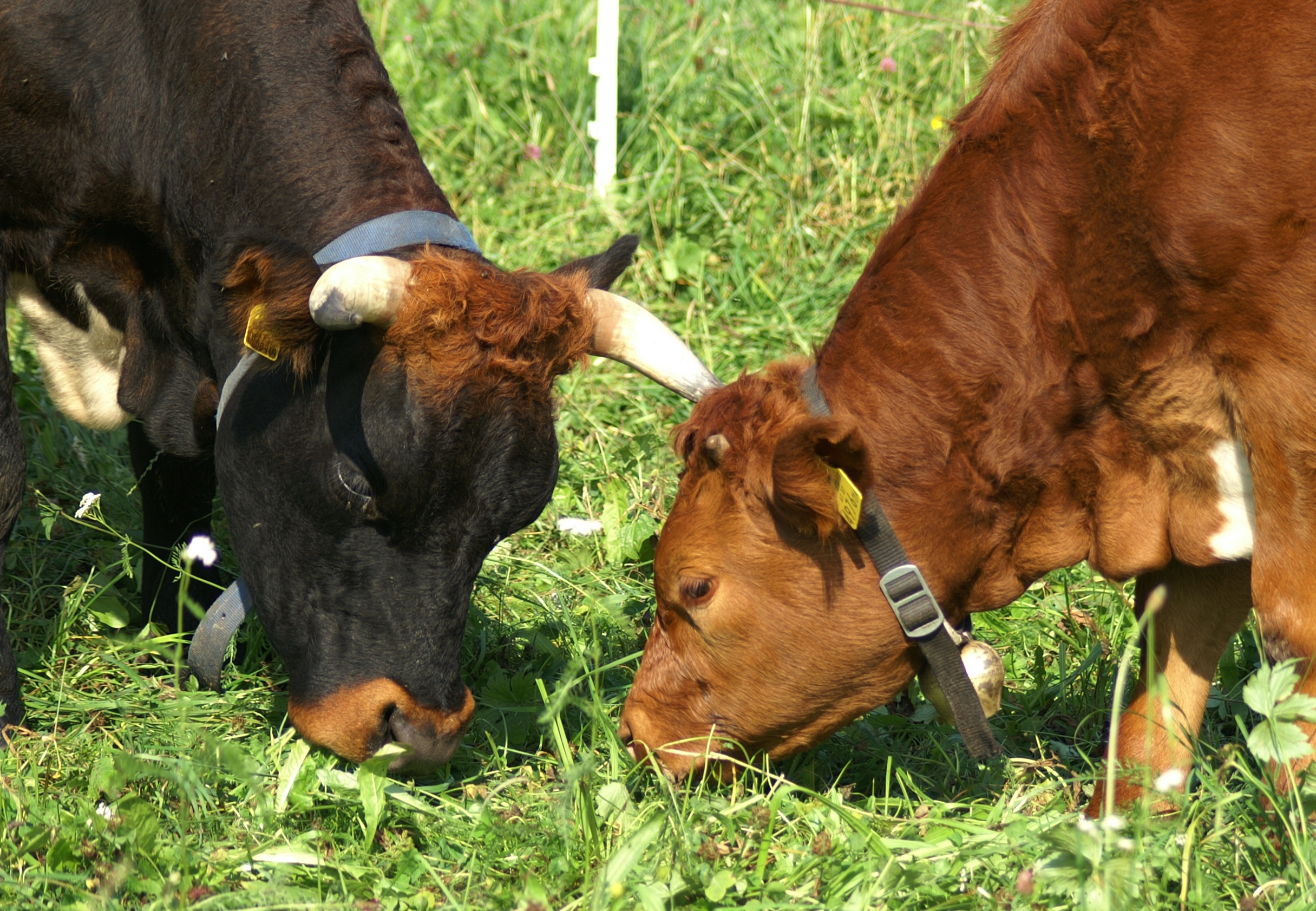
Tux-Zillertal cattle may be black or red

The Tux-Zillertal is of medium size, powerfully built with a strong neck and strong black-tipped horns. The coat is black or red, with white markings on the pelvis, the root of the tail, the underbelly and on the udder. The black colour derives from the Tux breed, and the red from the Zillertal. The skin is dark, the nose and hooves black. The Tux-Zillertal is a frugal breed, well adapted to high mountain pastures.

== Use ==
As with the Hérens and Évolène breeds of Switzerland, cows are used for cow-fighting contests, and have long been selectively bred for this purpose rather than for productive characteristics, resulting in decreased milk performance. The milk has an exceptionally high fat content.
