= Hoher Riffler =

Hoher Riffler may refer to:

- Hoher Riffler (Zillertal Alps), a 3,231 m high mountain, near Hintertux, Schwaz District, Tyrol, Austria
- Hoher Riffler (Verwall Group), a 3,168 m high mountain, near St. Anton am Arlberg, Landeck District, Tyrol, Austria
