= Tuxertal =

Valley in Tyrol, Austria

Coordinates: 47°9′45″N 11°45′15″E

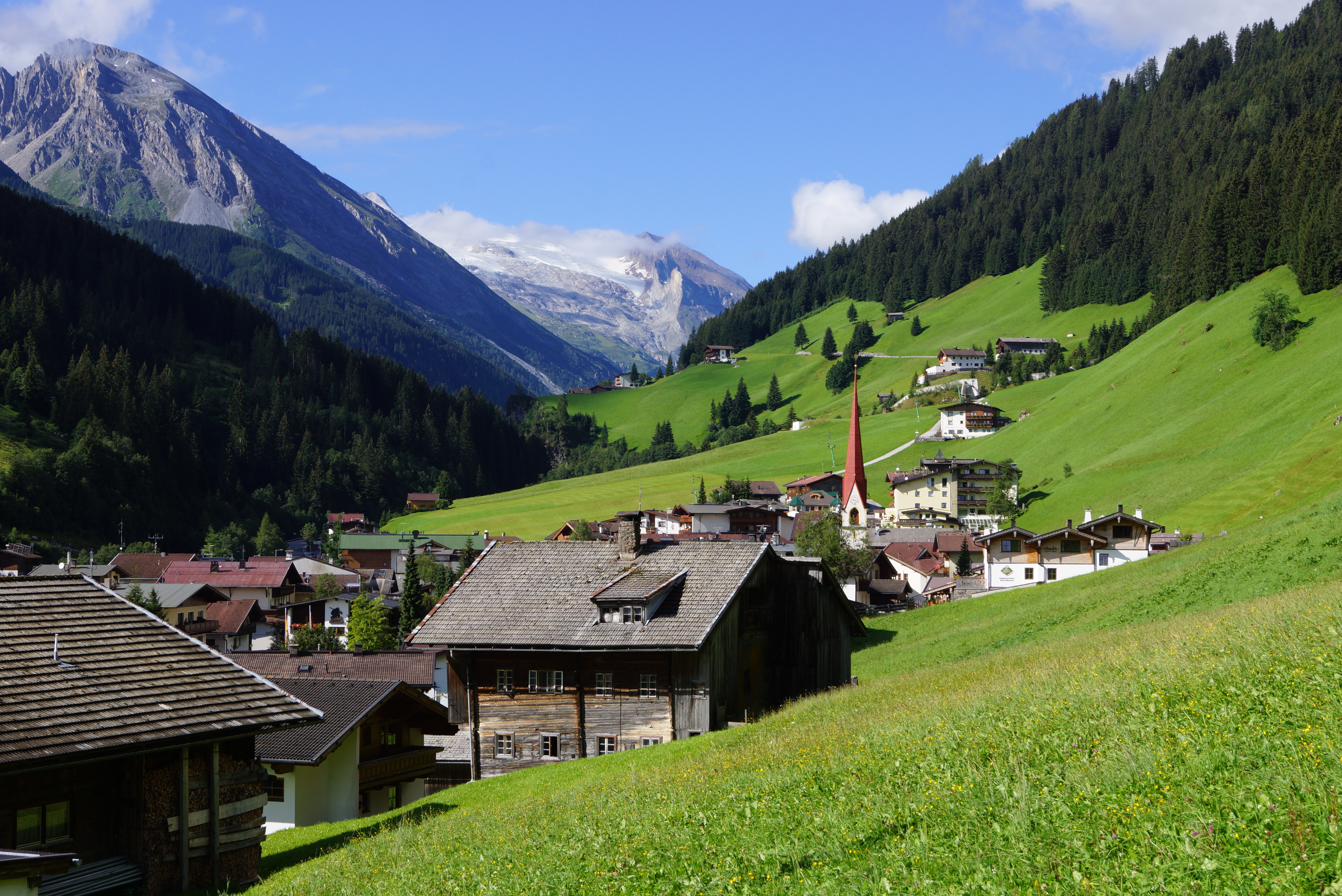
Lanersbach in Tuxertal, Tyrol, Austria

The Tuxertal is a valley located in Tyrol, Austria. A side valley of the Zillertal, from which it branches at Mayrhofen, the Tuxertal is about 13 km long and accessible on the Tuxer Straße (Tux Road). From Mayrhofen (630 m (AA)) to Hintertux (1500 m) in the municipality of Tux, the village that gives the valley its name, there is a height difference of about 850 m. The valley ends at Hintertux and the Hintertux Glacier. The Tuxbach, which rises near Hintertux, flows as far as Mayrhofen where it empties into the River Ziller.

The five main settlements in the Tuxertal are (from the head of the valley): Hintertux (1,500 m), Madseit (1,385 m), Juns (1360 m), Tux (former Lanersbach) (1,300 m), Vorderlanersbach (1,300 m) and the parish of Finkenberg (840 m).

The Tuxertal is the only way of reaching the Hintertux Glacier by means of road and cable lift.

== Gallery ==
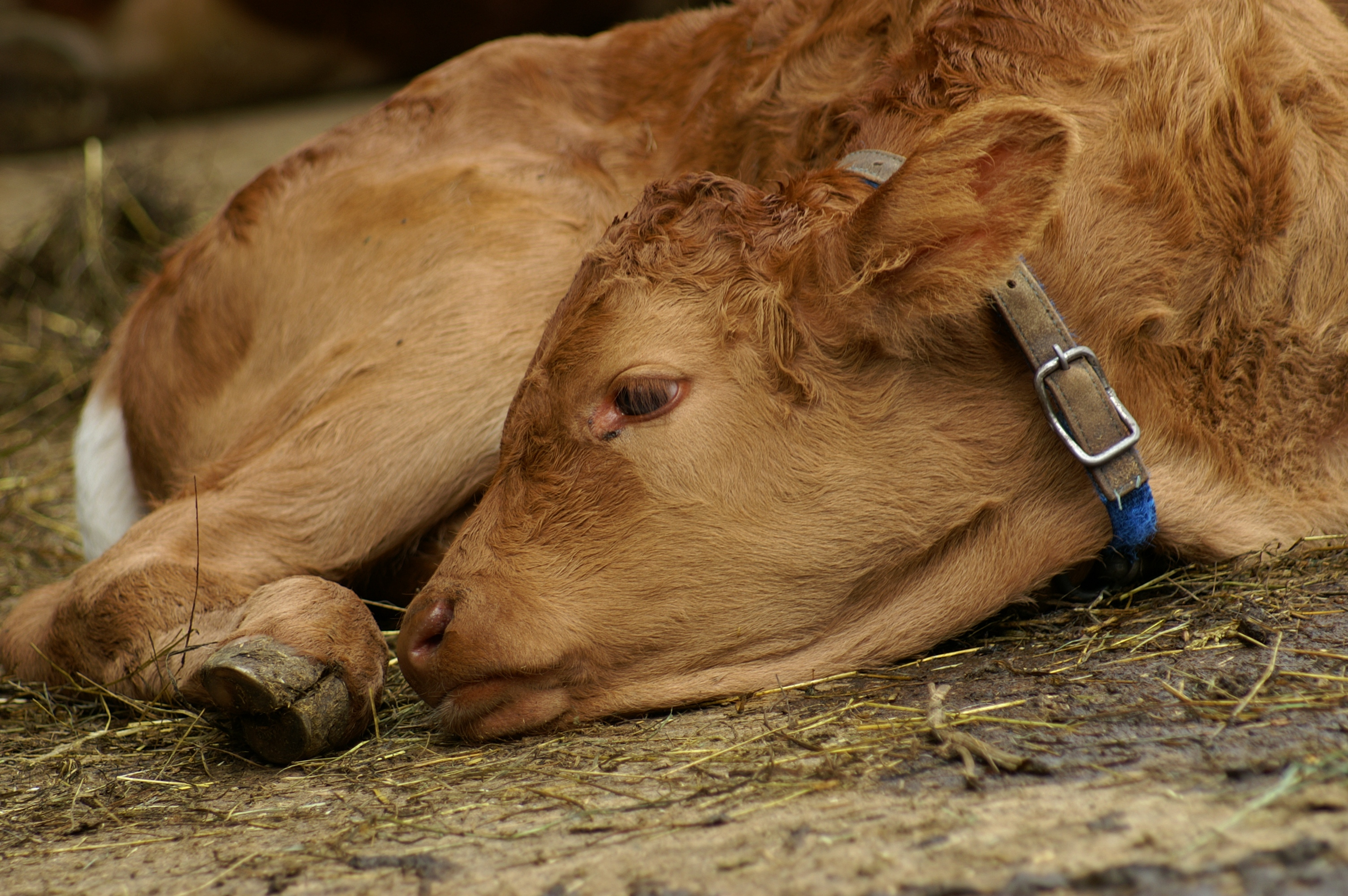
Tux cattle

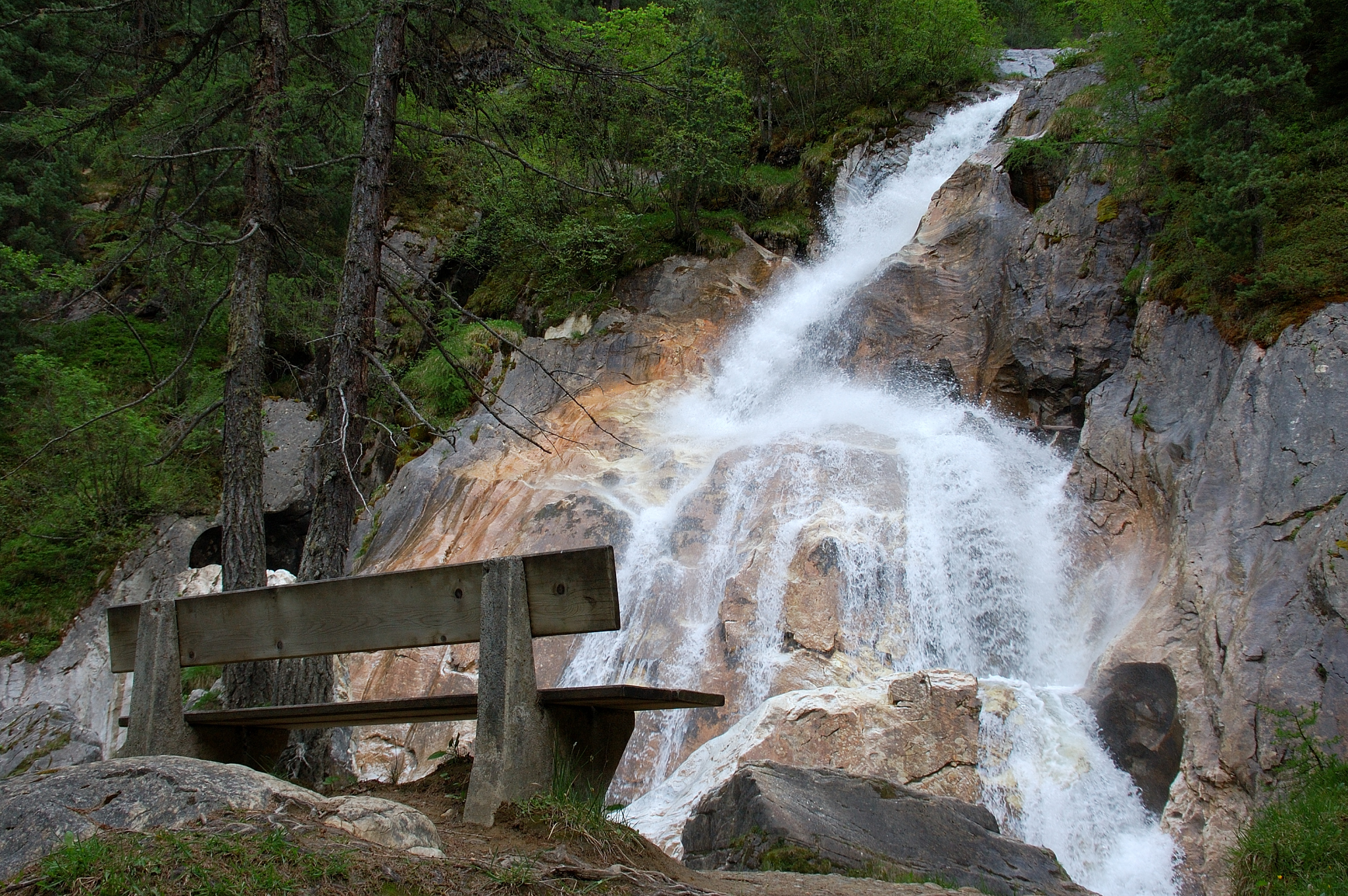
Tuxbach stream, fed by meltwaters
