= Hintertux Glacier =

Ski resort in Austria

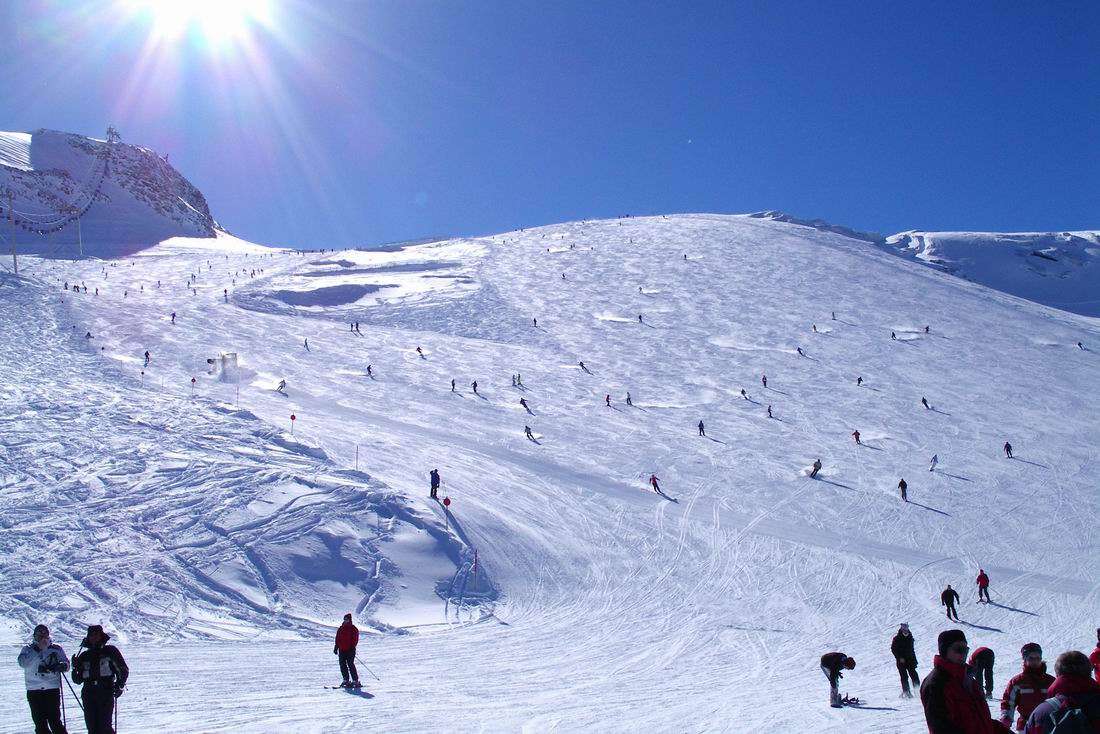
- The Tuxerfernerhang, a piste on the Hintertux Glacier
- Interactive map of Hintertux Glacier
- Location: Tyrol, Austria
- Nearest city: Innsbruck
- Coordinates: 47°04′31″N 11°40′04″E
- Status: Active
- Top elevation: 3,250 m (10,660 ft)
- Base elevation: 1,500 m (4,900 ft)
- Trails: 64 km: 17.2 km blue; 35.1 km red; 11.7 km black
- Longest run: "Schwarze Pfanne", 12 km (7.5 mi)
- Lift capacity: 94,000 passengers/hr
- Website: Official website

The Hintertux Glacier (German: Hintertuxer Gletscher) is the tourist name for the glaciers of the Gefrorene-Wand-Kees, also called the Tuxer Ferner, and the nearby Riepenkees at the top of the Tuxertal, a side valley of the Zillertal in the Austrian state of Tyrol. At its highest point the ski region reaches a height of 3,250 m (10,660 ft) in the saddle between the peaks of the Gefrorene-Wand-Spitzen. Both glaciers can be accessed by gondola and chair lifts.

== Ice ==
The ice of the Hintertux Glacier is up to 120 metres (390 ft) thick at its deepest point and between 500 and 1,000 years old. It has a length of about 4 km (2.5 mi), but this varies annually by up to 40 metres (130 ft). As a result, the lifts have to be moved several times a year so that the masts remain vertical. 61 of the ski resort's support constructions are located on glacier ice. The glacier contains up to about 190 million cubic metres of ice.

== Glacier development ==
Since the end of the Little Ice Age in the second half of the nineteenth century, the Hintertux Glacier has been subject to a long-term retreat. Like many glaciers in the Alps, it has experienced significant losses in both area and volume due to rising temperatures and changing precipitation patterns.

Studies of Austrian glaciers indicate accelerated ice loss since the late twentieth century. The Hintertux Glacier follows this broader Alpine trend, with ongoing reductions in glacier mass and increasing exposure of rock and debris surfaces.

In addition to glacier retreat, geomorphological changes such as the formation of moraine areas, rockfall activity and other paraglacial processes have become increasingly visible in glacier forefields throughout the Alps.

Model simulations suggest that continued warming will result in further glacier mass loss across the European Alps, even under scenarios of climate stabilization.

== Tourism ==
A piste on the Hintertux Glacier (2026)

=== The ski area ===
Due to its high elevation, the Hintertux Glacier is among Austria's most snow-reliable ski areas. Ski operations are typically possible from early autumn until late spring. The chairlift Gefrorene Wand, opened in 1968, was the world's first chairlift whose support towers were erected on glacier ice.

The ski area offers 64 kilometres (40 mi) of pistes in winter, covering a total skiable area of approximately 233 hectares (0.90 sq mi)). Of the 64 kilometres in winter, 17.2 km (27%) are classified as easy/blue, 35.1 km (55%) as intermediate/red, and 11.7 km (18%) as difficult/black. The longest run to the valley, the Schwarze Pfanne ("black pan"), measures 12 kilometres (7.5 mi) with a vertical drop of 1,750 metres (5,740 ft).

There is a freestyle snowpark called Betterpark Hintertux whose entrance is located at the Olperer lifts at 3,200 metres (10,500 ft) above sea level, making it the country’s highest freestyle area. It serves as a training facility for advanced and professional riders and features four lines (pro, medium, jib and easy) with 9 jumps and 21 jib obstacles, and is typically open from April to the end of May and from mid-September to December.

At the free-of-charge Flohpark Hintertux near the parking lot at the valley station, children can learn how to ski on with the help of conveyor belts and beginner lifts. For children at intermediate level, the ski resort offers the following areas: The Kidsslope Hintertux features snow tunnels and is accessible via the Ramsmoos T-bar lift. The Funslope Hintertux in the Sommerberg ski area features wide banked turns, dynamic wave tracks and large snow elements, and is accessible via the Tuxerjoch 4‑seater chairlift.

==== Lifts and cable cars ====
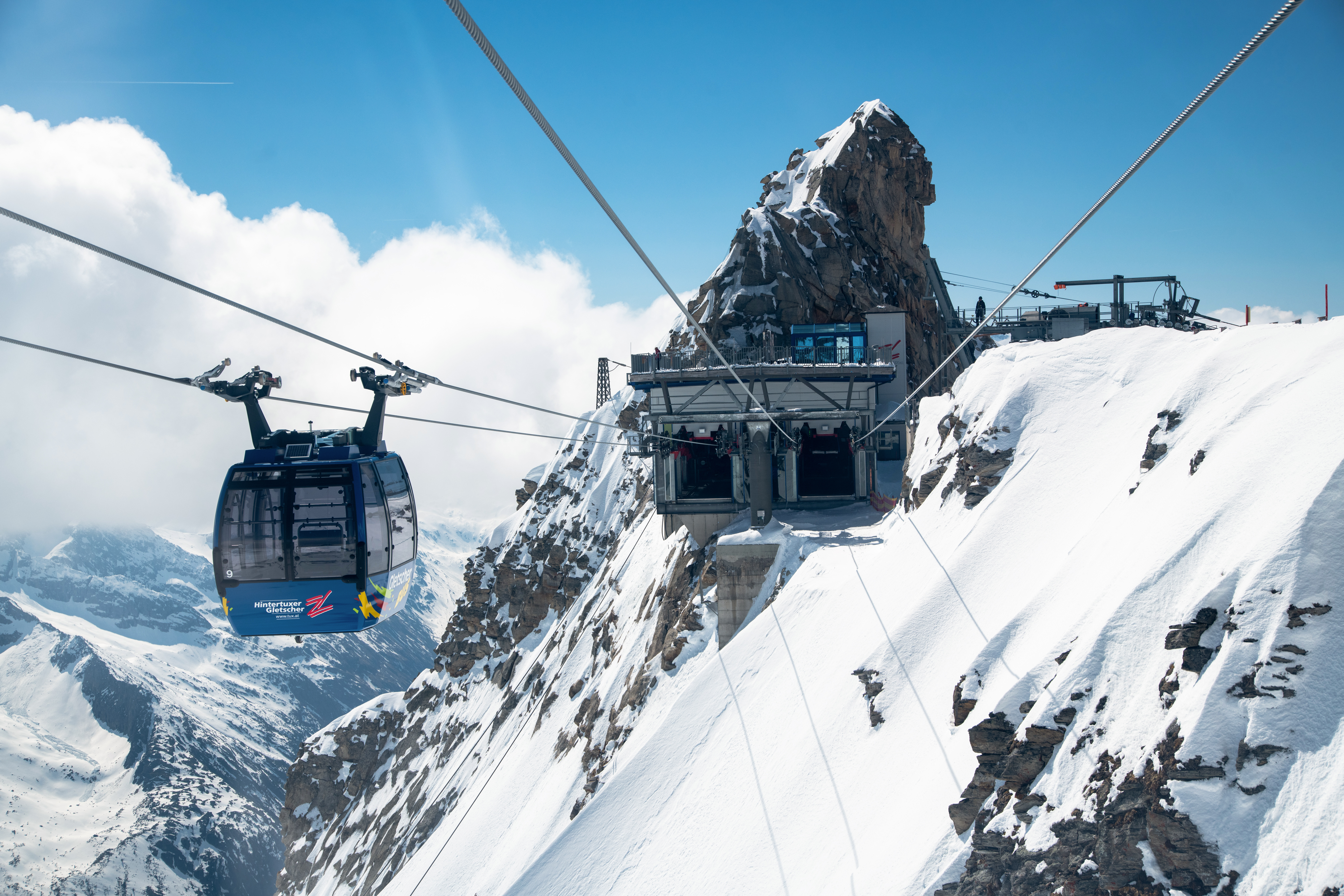
Cable car "Gletscherbus 3" at the Hintertux Glacier mountain station (2023)

The ski area features 21 lifts and cable cars reaching elevations of up to 3,250 metres (10,660 ft). The area has a total lift capacity of 94,000 people per hour. The Hintertux valley station (Talstation Hintertux) is located at an elevation of 1,500 metres (4,900 ft).

To transport the large number of tourists on the Hintertux Glacier, three large gondola lifts of the Funitel type have been built: the so-called Gletscherbus ("glacier bus") gondolas where the gondolas are suspended on two steel cables and are able to carry 24 people each. The Gletscherbus gondolas have been built by Doppelmayr. The third large gondola lift was opened in the 2008/2009 winter season; it is called the Gletscherbus 1 and runs from the valley station up to the Sommerberg. It replaced the older 4-person gondolas that had previously handled the transport of people to the Sommerbergalm along with the 8-person gondola lift that is still running. In order to ensure all-year operations, there are two cableways in each section of the feeders from the valley station to the Gefrorene Wand. The Gletscherbus 3 which serves the upper section of the ski area is the world's highest bicable gondola lift. It received new cabins in 2021.

The Gefrorene Wand single-cable 10-person gondola lift replaced the 30-year-old Gefrorene Wand 3a double chair lift in 2011. It has been built by Doppelmayr and features heated seating.

=== Other activities ===
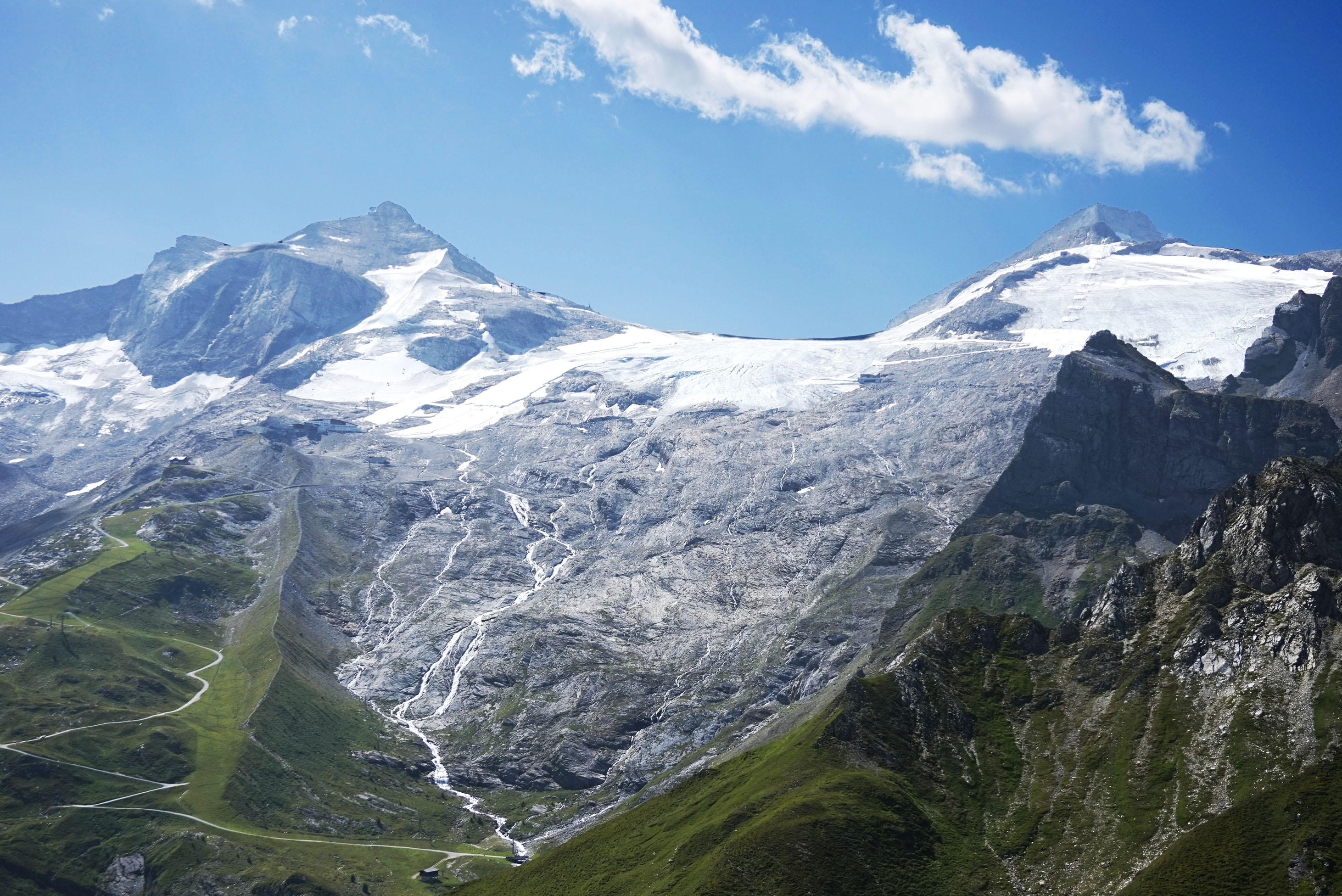
The Hintertux Glacier in summer (August 2017)

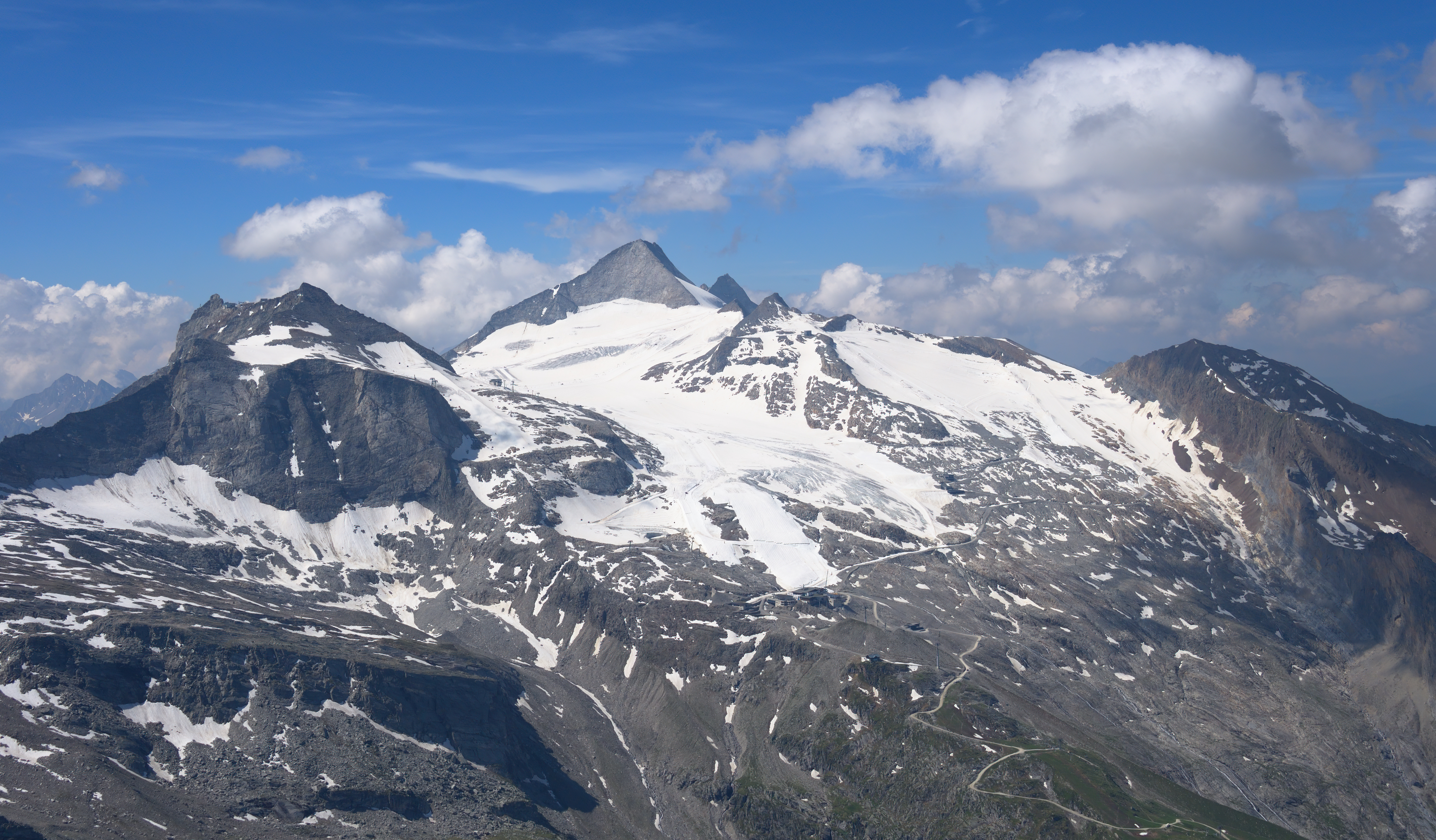
Aerial view of the Hintertux Glacier (June 2026)

In addition to its winter sports facilities, the Hintertux Glacier features a panoramic viewing terrace at an elevation of 3,250 metres (10,660 ft), offering extensive views of the surrounding Alpine landscape. The terrace is accessible year-round and can be reached by cable car via the gondola lift Gletscherbus 3.

The region is also suitable for mountaineering. There are plenty of Alpine huts, some managed all-year round. The Sommerberg is the starting point for numerous hiking trails including the scenic route to the Tuxer Joch Haus that continues through the Weitental valley, passing the 40‑metre Schleier waterfall before returning to Hintertux.

The Spannagel Cave, located beneath the Spannagelhaus, is a protected natural monument. More than 13 kilometres of passages have been explored, making it one of the most significant marble karst cave systems in the Central Alps.

The Natur Eis Palast is a crevasse that was discovered in 2007 and is open to the public. Its entrance is just above the top station on the Gletscherbus 3 lift. Visitors can climb about 25 metres (82 ft) down into the ice using a combination of steps and ladders. The crevasse maintains a constant temperature of 0 °C (32 °F) throughout the year.

== Access ==
Hintertux Glacier is located in the Tyrol region of Austria at the end of the Tuxertal, a side valley of the Zillertal, around 87 km southeast of Innsbruck and 20 km south of Mayrhofen. The nearest major airports are Innsbruck Airport, which offers frequent European and UK connections, and Munich Airport, which provides extensive international services; both link efficiently to the resort via rail connections through Innsbruck and Jenbach. From Innsbruck, regular trains run to Jenbach, where travellers transfer to the Zillertalbahn for Mayrhofen and continue by bus to Hintertux. Local bus services operate between Mayrhofen, Tux and the Hintertux Glacier valley station, with several routes free for skiers. The resort is also accessible by car via the A12 autobahn and the Zillertalstraße B169 into the Zillertal, with a total driving time of under 1.5 hours from Innsbruck.

== Trivia ==
In 2017, the glacier was included in the music video of Ed Sheeran's song, Perfect, which shows a romantic story. Ed Sheeran is shown arriving in the Zillertal by disembarking from the Zillertal Railway at the station in Mayrhofen. Later in the music video, he is seen waiting for friends together with Zoey Deutch at the panorama bar of the Tuxer Fernerhaus. Scenes depicting après-ski activities were filmed at the Hohenhaus Tenne in Hintertux, which is located directly at the valley station of the Hintertux Glacier cable car. Sunset scenes were filmed at the Gefrorene Wand at an elevation of 3,250 m, with ski lifts and pistes of the Hintertux Glacier visible in the background.

== Gallery ==
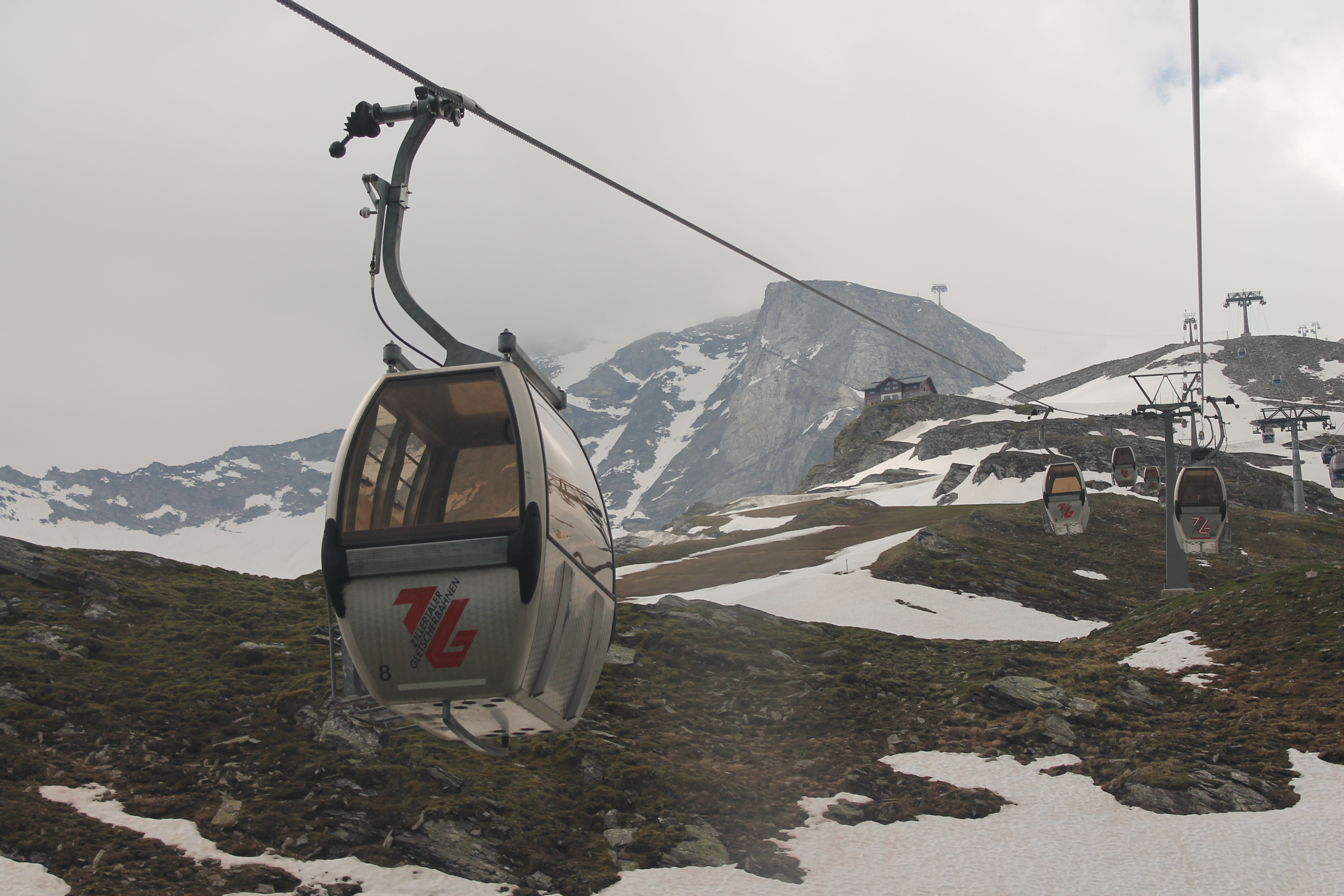
Hintertux Ski slopes

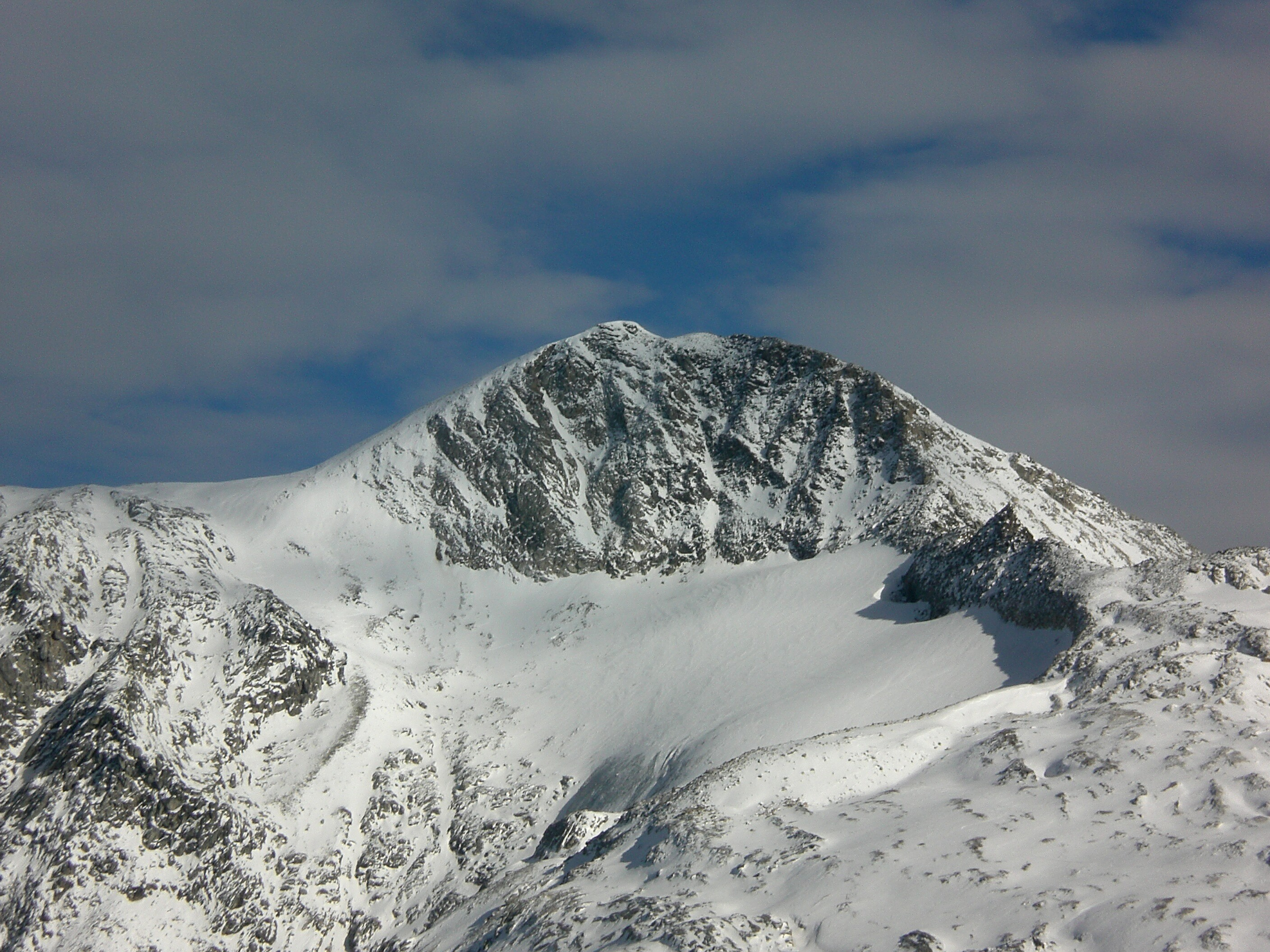
The Hoher Riffler 3231m seen from the Spannagelhaus (Nov 2007)

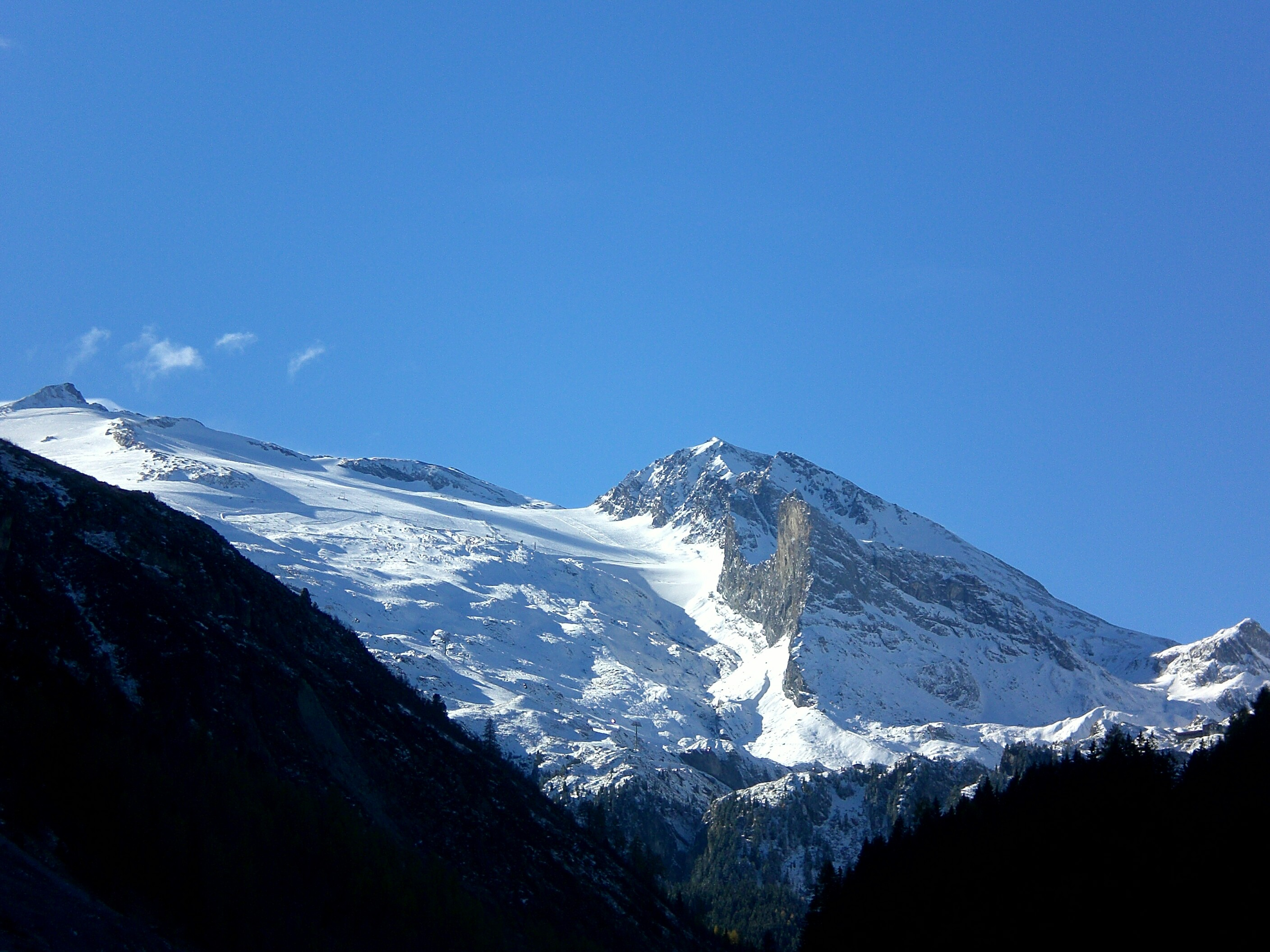
View from the valley of the Lärmstange (Nov 2007)

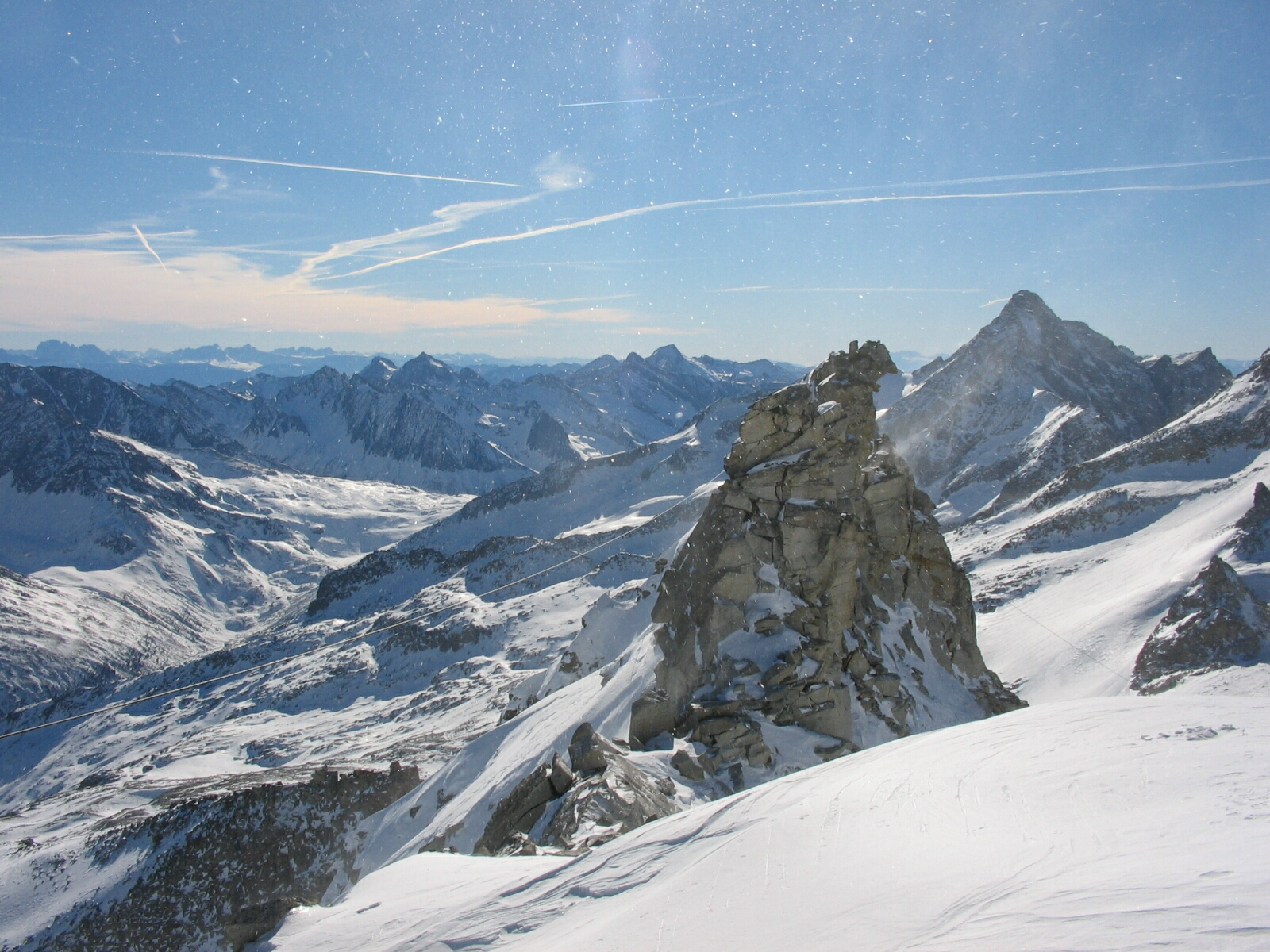
View from the Hintertux Glacier (below the Gefrorenen Wand) looking south (Schlegeis) (Feb 2007)
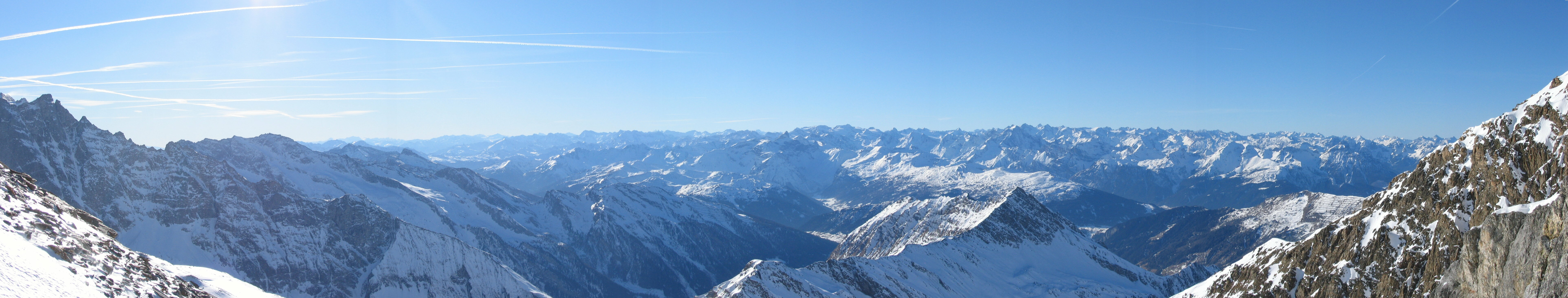
Panoramic view of the Hintertux Glacier from the Gefrorene Wand (Feb 2007)
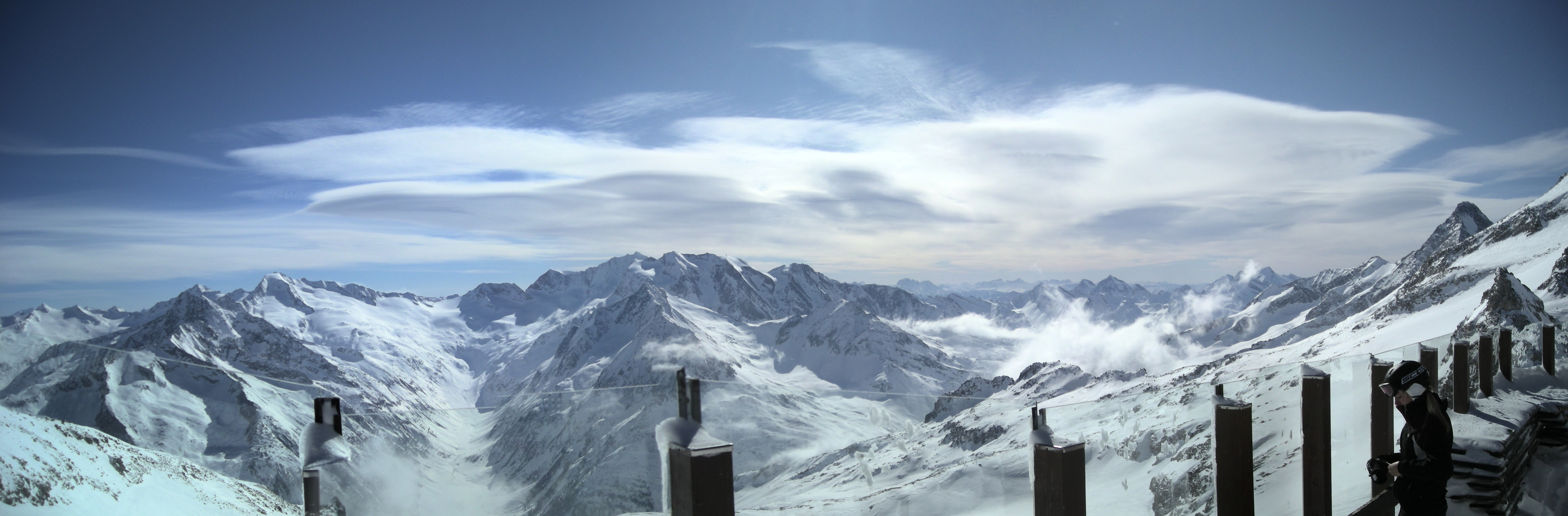
Panoramic view from the Gletscher Hut (Feb 2009)
