= Olperer =

Mountain in Tyrol, Austria

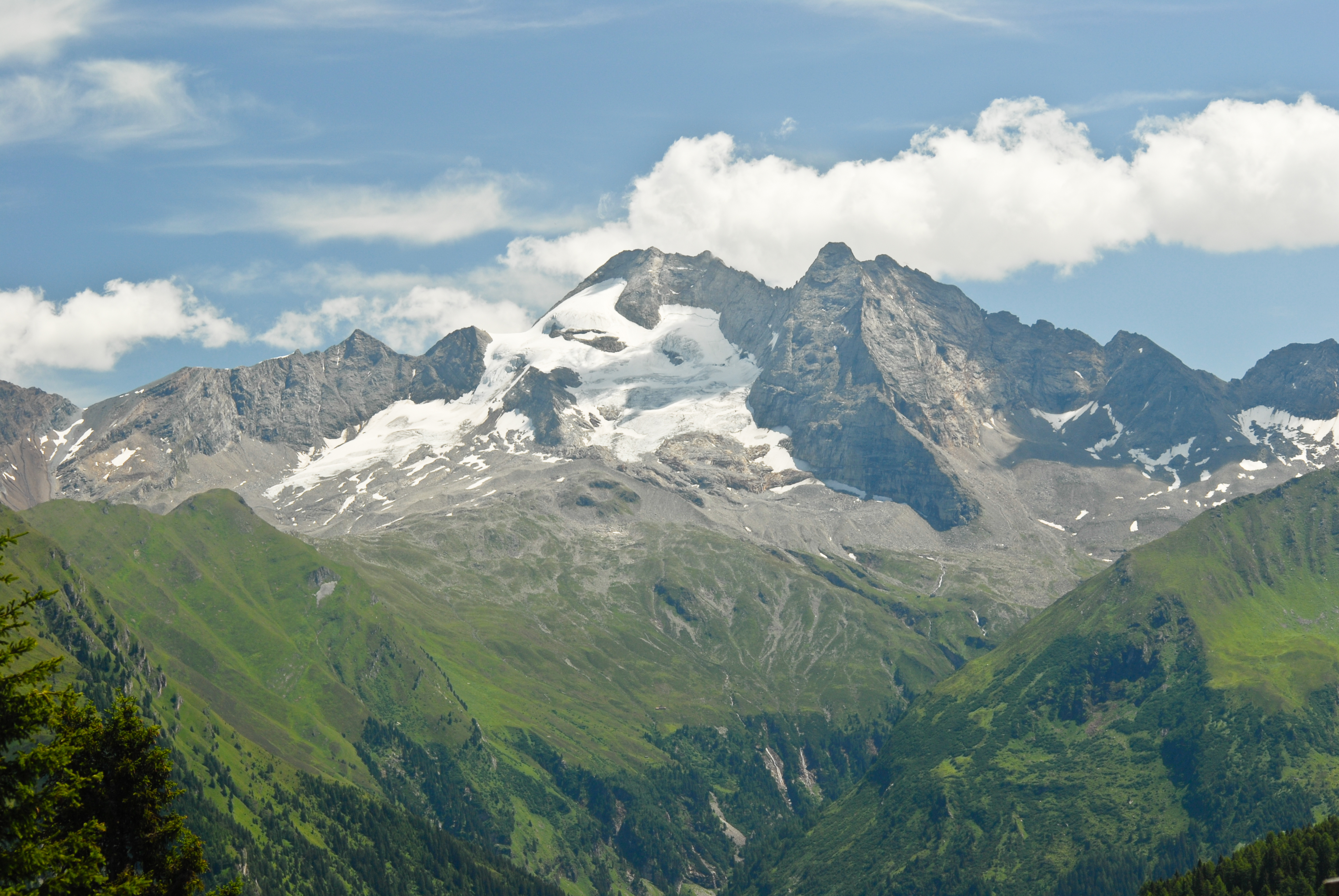
- The Olperer from the west

Highest point
- Elevation: 3,476 m (AA) (11,404 ft)
- Prominence: 1,230 m (4,040 ft)
- Listing: Alpine mountains above 3000 m
- Coordinates: 47°03′12″N 11°39′32″E

Geography
- Location within Austria
- Location: Tyrol, Austria
- Parent range: Zillertal Alps

Geology
- Mountain type: Rock summit
- Rock type(s): Granite, gneiss

Climbing
- First ascent: 1867 Paul Grohmann, Georg Samer and Jakob Huber over the southeast ridge (Südostgrat)
- Easiest route: Olperer Hut, southeast ridge (with small Schneegupf firn field), or north ridge from Geraer Hut over sections of glacier

The Olperer is a 3,476-metre-high (11,404 ft) mountain in the Zillertal Alps in the Austrian federal state of Tyrol. It is the main summit on the Tux Crest (Tuxer Kamm) and is often crossed in the summer as climbers transit from the Olperer Hut to the Geraer Hut. It was first climbed on 10 September 1867 along the southeast ridge (Südostgrat) by Paul Grohmann, Georg Samer and Gainer Jackl. On its north flank is the ski region known as Hintertux Glacier on the Gefrorene-Wand-Kees glacier (also called the Tuxer Ferner).

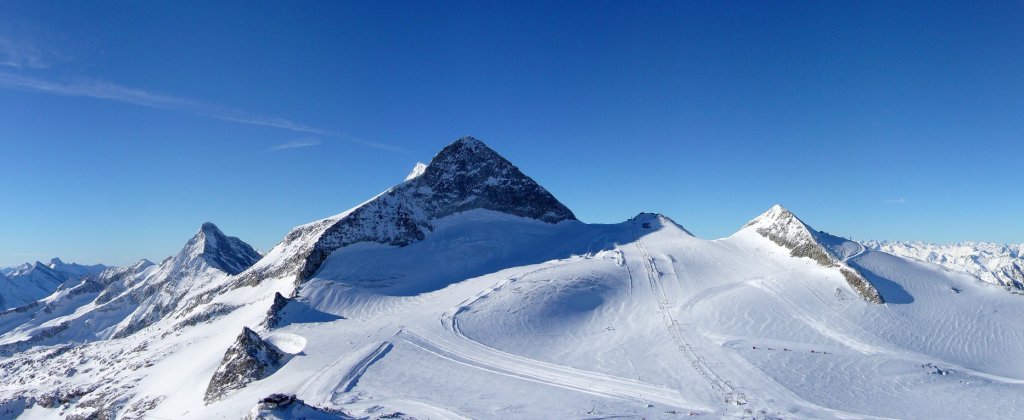
View from the Gefrorenen Wandspitzen.

== Location and area ==
The Olperer, with its pyramidal summit block, presents a striking appearance. As a result of that and because of its geographical prominence over its nearby peaks, the summit is a popular viewing point. It lies about four kilometres as the crow flies northwest of the Schlegeisspeicher dam and seven kilometres south of Hintertux. Its neighbours are, to the north and separated by the Wildlahnerscharte (3,220 m), the Großer Kaserer at 3,266 metres, to the southeast along the crest the 3,381-metre-high (11,093 ft) Fußstein and, to the northeast, separated by the Großes Riepenkees glacier, lie the twin peaks of the Gefrorene-Wand-Spitzen, the southern summit of which lies at a height of 3,270 metres.

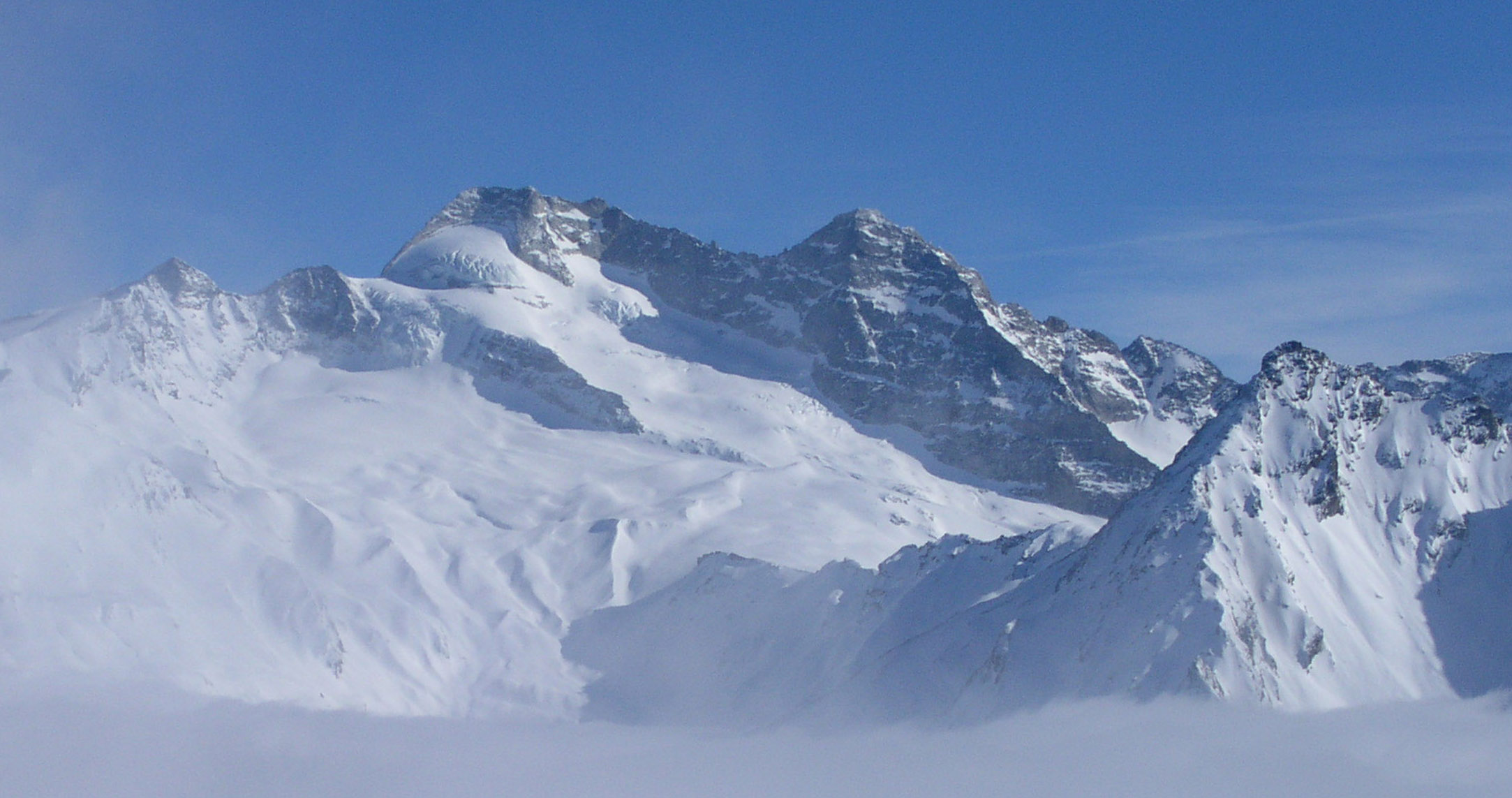
View from the northwest. Right: the Fußstein

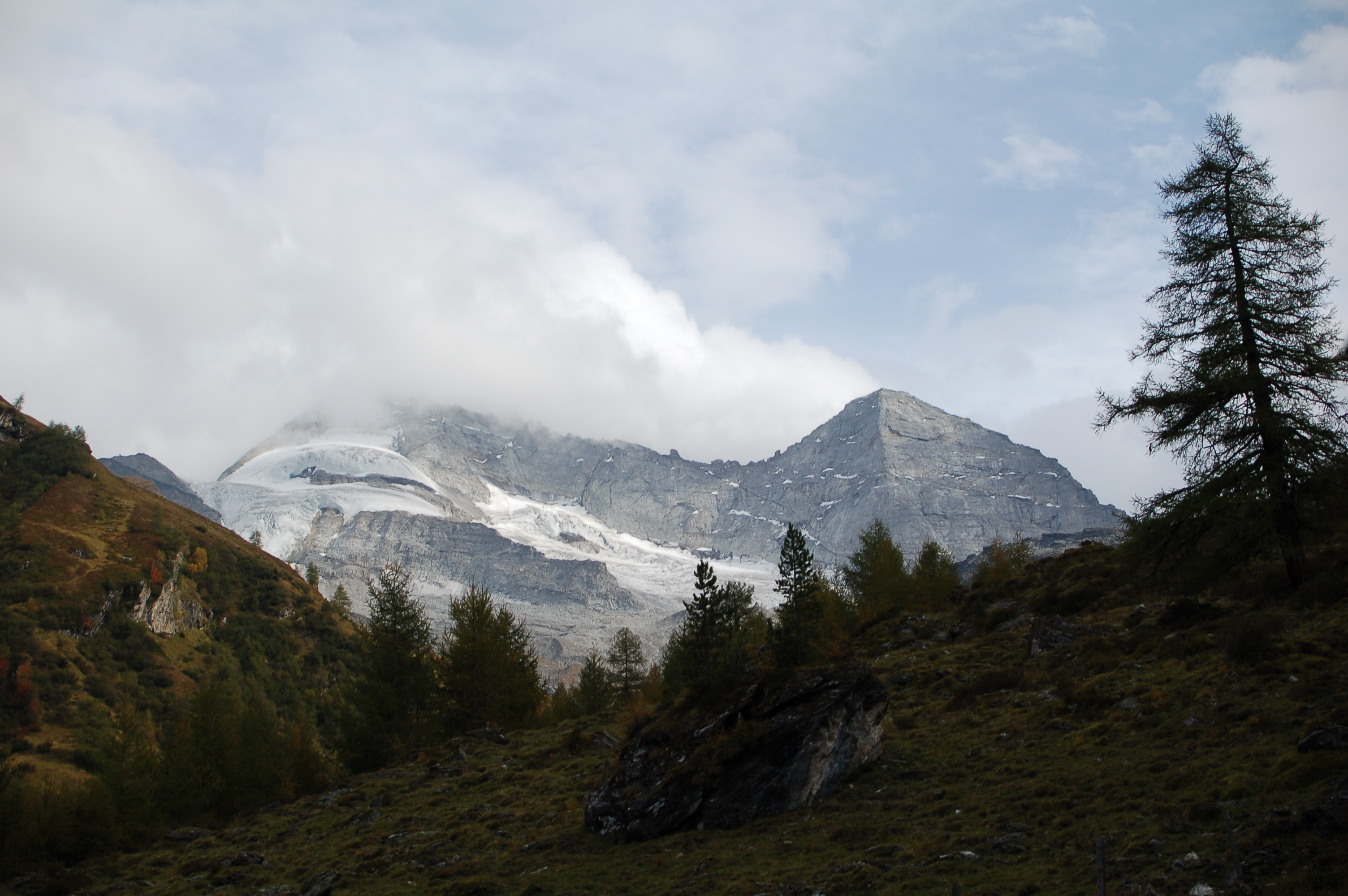
The Olperer and the Fußstein. View from Wildlahnertal near Schmirn

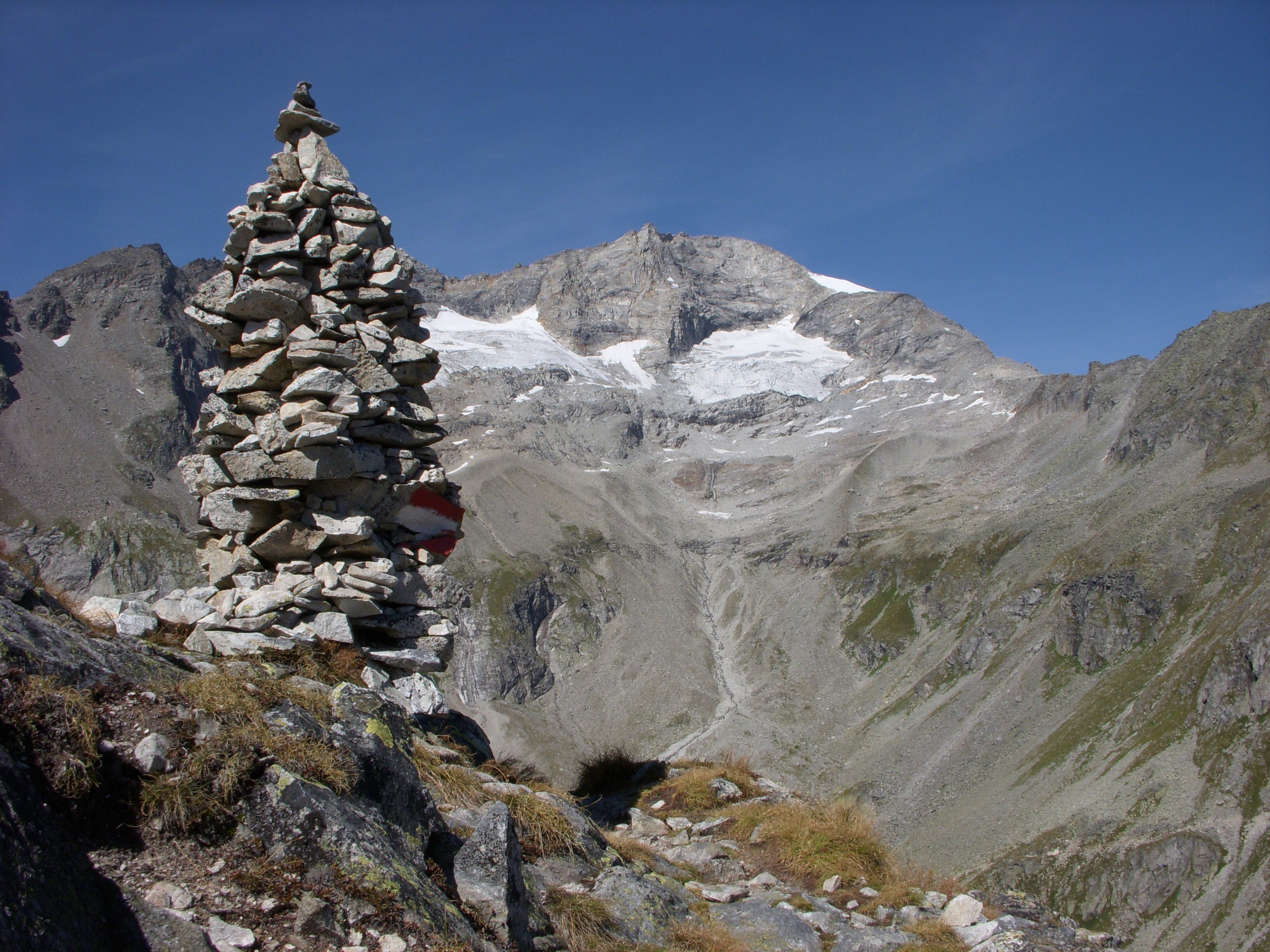
South face of Olperer

== Sources and maps ==
- H. Klier und W. Klier: Alpine Club Guide Zillertaler Alpen, Munich, 1996, ISBN 3-7633-1269-2
- Alpine Club Map 1:25,000, Sheet 35/1, Zillertaler Alpen West
