= Tux, Tyrol =

Tux
- Municipality
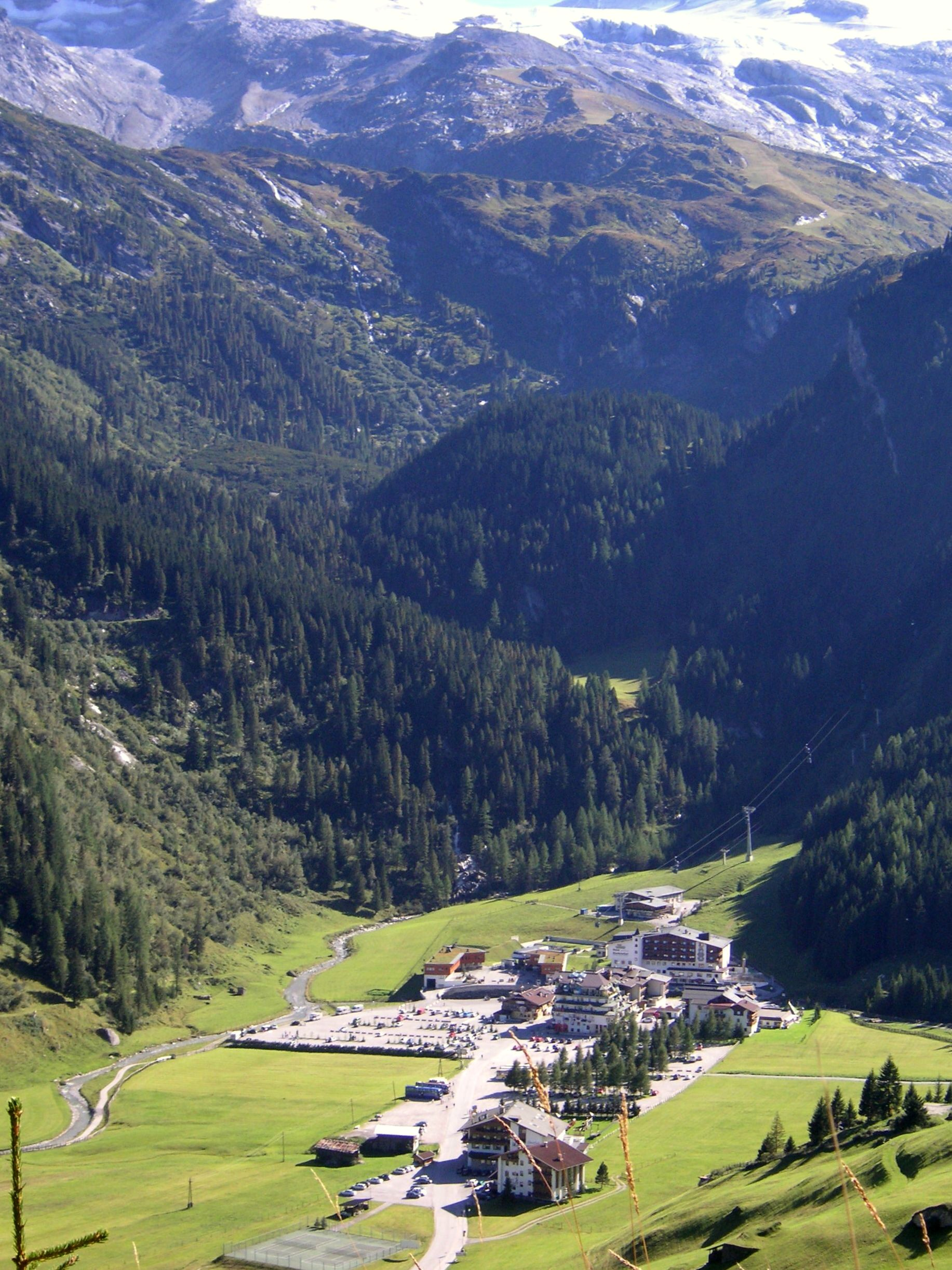

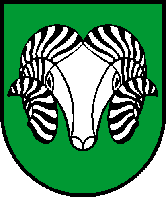
- Coat of arms

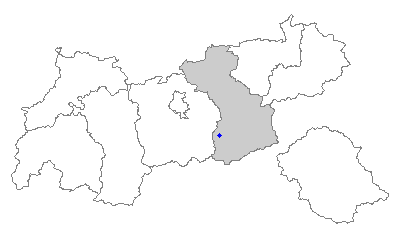
- Location within Tyrol

- Location within Austria
- Coordinates: 47°07′00″N 11°40′00″E
- Country: Austria
- State: Tyrol
- District: Schwaz

Government
  - Mayor: Simon Grubauer

Area
  - Total: 111.13 km^{2} (42.91 sq mi)
- Elevation: 1,281 m (4,203 ft)

Population (2021)
  - Total: 1,924
  - Density: 17.31/km^{2} (44.84/sq mi)
- Time zone: UTC+1 (CET)
  - Summer (DST): UTC+2 (CEST)
- Postal code: 6293
- Area code: 05287
- Vehicle registration: SZ
- Website: gemeinde-tux.at

Tux is a municipality in the Schwaz district in the Austrian state of Tyrol.

== Geography ==
The parish of Tux covers the higher and largest part of the Tuxertal, a side valley of the Zillertal that branches off at Mayrhofen. The territory of the parish extends to the glaciated peak of Olperer (3,476 m) and the 2,338 m high saddle of the Tuxer Joch, a crossing between the Zillertal and Wipptal valleys that was heavily used even in the protohistoric period. Other prominent peaks within the municipality are the 3,288 m high Gefrorene Wand Spitze and the 3,231 m high Hoher Riffler. The highest farmsteads lie at a height of 1,630 m.

Tux consists of the five villages of Tux-Vorderlanersbach (former Vorderlanersbach), Tux-Lanersbach (former Lanersbach), Juns, Madseit, and Hintertux.

On 25 January 2005 the state government renamed Lanersbach to Tux-Lanersbach and Vorderlanersbach to Tux-Vorderlanersbach because, although the municipality as a whole was called Tux, there was no actual village with the name.

Tux-Vorderlanersbach (1,300 m above sea level (AA)) is the first village along the road from Finkenberg. On the mountainside above lie the hamlets of Schöneben and Gemais. The farming settlement of Gemais at 1,450 m was placed under conservation protection as it has a historical coherence and unity of architectural style that date back to the 17th century. It developed from a former Schwaighof - a type of livestock farm typical of the Alpine region. The 2,292 m high hamlet of Geiseljoch lies on the way into the Inn valley that was once a busy trading route to the markets in Hall in Tirol and Innsbruck. From Vorderlanersbach there is a single-cable gondola lift to the Rastkogel skiing area, which in turn is linked to the nearby skiing areas of Penken and Eggalm.

Tux-Lanersbach (1,300 m above sea level (AA)) lies about two kilometres beyond Vorderlanersbach and forms the cultural and business heart of the Tuxertal. Tux-Lanersbach is both the seat of the municipality of Tux as well as a church parish that has existed since 1891. The parish church in Tux-Lanersbach was built in 1686 in place of an older Gothic church and was converted to the baroque style in 1750. In the south of the village at the Höllenstein Hut (about 1,800 m), a small farm museum has been established. A cable lift leads to the Eggalm ski and hiking area.

Juns (1,400 m above sea level (AA)) is a long drawn out village about 2 km up the valley from Tux-Lanersbach. It comprises several small hotels and private homes. There is a show mill worth seeing here that used to grind the barley corn grown here right up until just a few decades ago. Two toboggan runs descend from the Höhlenstein Hut and the alpine pasture of Grieralm, both roughly 5 km long, ending in Juns. The runs are lit and can be used in the evening.

Madseit (1,450 m above sea level (AA)) lies beyond the village of Juns and is a small settlement with several hotels, boarding houses and private homes. The valley narrows then behind the little hamlet, at the confluence of the Madseitbach and the Tuxerbach.

Hintertux (1,500 m above sea level (AA)) lies furthest up the valley at the foot of the Hintertux Glacier (one of the most popular summer skiing regions in Austria), and is surrounded by mountains and glaciers. It consists of hotels, guest houses and scattered farmhouses. The Church of the Assumption (Kirche Maria Himmelfahrt) was completed in 1952 on the site of a previous one that had been blown up in 1941.

In Hintertux are the highest thermal baths in Europe, with their various mineral springs. In the immediate vicinity of the Spannagelhaus lies the Spannagel Cave, that is over 10 km long and the largest natural cave in the Austrian Central Alps. The cave is under a preservation order and may only be visited as part of a guided tour.

At the Tuxer Ferner glacier is an all-season skiing area with a large number of lifts. The place is the base for many walks and high Alpine tours. The Hintertux Glacier Ski Region (Skigebiet Hintertuxer Gletscher) belongs to the Zillertal 3000 ski region and is a popular with skiers in summer as well as winter.

Hintertux has a population of 178 (as at: 2006). Until 1926 it belonged to the parish of Schmirn am Brenner.

=== Neighbouring parishes ===
Finkenberg, Hippach, Kolsassberg, Navis, Schmirn, Schwendau, Wattenberg, Weerberg

== History ==
The Tuxer valley was first mentioned in the records in 1280.

The Tuxer valley was discovered in prehistoric times as evinced by various finds from the middle Stone Age. The first settlers in the valley were probably Breuni, who came from the Raeti tribe and settled in the Wipptal.

Shepherds and miners also settled the valley, migrating over the Tuxer Joch from the Schmirn valley and cultivating it by clearing forests. In 889 the Tux valley, along with other parts of the Zillertal, went to the Archdiocese of Salzburg. In 1280 the name Tux (Tukkes) was first mentioned in the records. Originally referring to pure water, the term was adopted as the name of the valley. It is probably derived from the Indo-Germanic root, teg, which means "running, "flowing" or "melting away". The first farms were of the Schwaighof type and had to pay their taxes in kind e.g. in livestock.

The remotest valley between Lanersbach and Hintertux was, until 1438, a fief of the court of Matrei am Brenner and later Steinach am Brenner. Until 1926 Hintertux belonged to the parish of Schmirn. In 1926 Hintertux merged with Lanersbach and the mining office of Lämperbichl (Hauptmannschaft Lämperbichl) to form the parish of Tux.

== Economy ==
=== Agriculture ===
The meadows and alpine pastures in the Tux valley continue to be cultivated even today, albeit most farms only provide a secondary source of income.

=== Tourism ===
Tourism is the most important branch of the economy in the valley today with numerous hotels, restaurants and accommodation providers being established here. Three ski regions have been opened up for the ski tourism industry: the first was the Eggalm region in 1961; it was joined in 1968 by the Hintertux Glacier and from 1984 by the Rastkogel, which has been linked to the Penken Ski Region since 2001 by a shuttle lift. During the 2000s the capacity of the lift infrastructure was massively increased. The Hintertux Glacier was operated as an all-year skiing area from the outset. Just as important for the region is the merger of the Tux ski regions with those in the direction of Finkenberg and Mayrhofen (Penken). After Mayrhofen, Tux has the second-highest number of overnight guests in the Zillertal.

=== Magnesite factory ===
From 1927 to 1976 the Tux Magnesite Mine, about 500 m above Vorderlanersbach, was the highest of its kind in Europe. Using open-cast and underground mining up to 400 workers mined magnesite. Special cableways for workers and materiel linked the factory with Lanersbach and the loading station in the Zillertal near Mayrhofen. On the Schrofenalm, about 500 m away from the factory, was a small settlement with accommodation, a school, a grocer's shop, a cinema and other facilities for factory employees and their families. When the factory closed in 1976 it was completely demolished and the area renaturalised. All that remains are St. Barbara's Chapel, built in 1947 based on plans by Hubert Prachensky with frescoes by Max Weiler, and two former worker's houses, the Schrofenhäuser.

== Transport ==
Tux is accessible from Mayrhofen by road. From Mayrhofen station on the Ziller Valley Railway there is a bus service. The nearest Austrian Federal Railway station is at Jenbach, which is also the departure station for the Ziller Valley Railway. Within the Tux valley there is a free bus service - the Tuxer Sportbus - that runs during the day between Vorderlanersbach and Hintertux. In the winter months there is also a fare-charging Nightliner bus until 2 a.m.
