= Gefrorene-Wand-Spitzen =

Two summitsin the Zillertal Alps, Austria

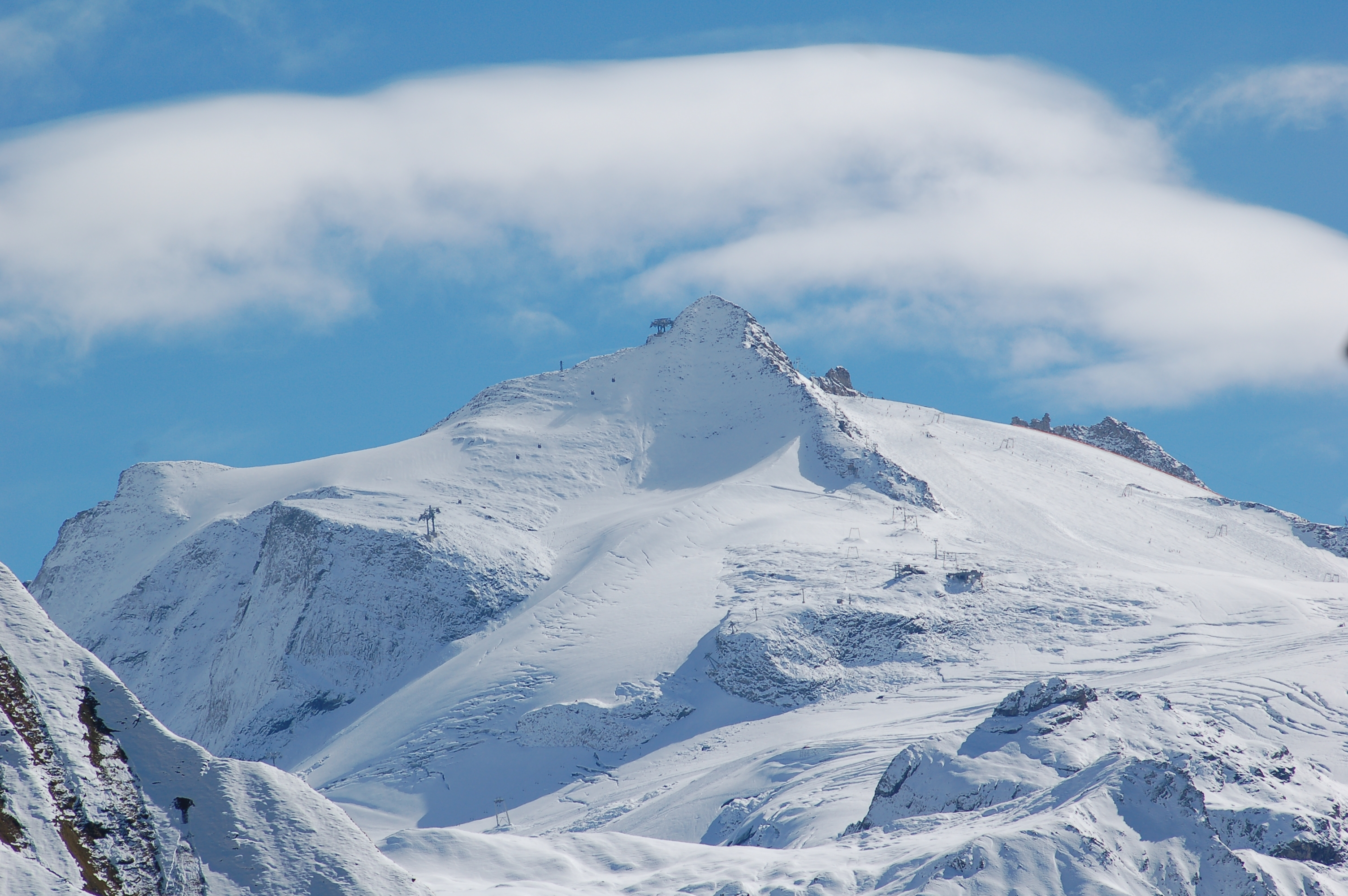
- The north summit of the Gefrorene-Wand-Spitzen from Durrachjöchl in the northwest

Highest point
- Elevation: 3,288 m (AA) (10,787 ft)
- Coordinates: 47°03′55″N 11°40′45″E

Geography
- Location within Austria
- Location: Tyrol, Austria
- Parent range: Zillertal Alps

Geology
- Mountain type: granite gneiss

Climbing
- First ascent: North summit: 1867 by Dr. Berreitter, South summit: 7 September 1872 by Max and Richard von Frey

The Gefrorene-Wand-Spitzen are two summits on the Tux Crest (Tuxer Kamm), a mountain chain in the Zillertal Alps, one of the ranges of the central Eastern Alps in the Austrian state of Tyrol. The north summit (Nordgipfel) is recorded as 3,286 metres high in the literature, but is 3,288 metres high according to the Federal Office for Metrology and Survey. The south summit (Südgipfel), by contrast, is only 3,270 metres high. The two peaks are about 300 metres apart. They appear from the north as a stubby, cone-shaped, firn-covered dome, but from the east as a forbidding, dark rock face. Sharp, prominent ridges radiate from the peaks to the northeast and southwest, along the main crest of the mountain range. The twin peaks are the highest points in the summer skiing area of the Hintertux Glacier and, since the end of the 1990s, have been accessible from Hintertux on cable cars and ski lifts; which makes them a popular destination for day trippers. The north summit was first conquered in 1867 by Dr. Berreitter, the south summit on 7 September 1872 by brothers Max and Richard von Frey from Salzburg.

== Surrounding area ==
The Gefrorenen-Wand-Spitzen are surrounded by glaciers. To the west the vast Gefrorene-Wand-Kees reaches up to the summits; to the southwest the Große Riepenkees reaches the 3,000 metre mark; to the northeast lies the little Friesenbergkees and, to the southeast is the Kleine Riepenkees. Their neighbouring peaks are: along the northeast ridge (Nordostgrat), separated by the Friesenbergscharte (2,904 m), the 3,231-metre-high (10,600 ft) Riffler; along the southwest ridge (Südwestgrat), separated by the broad Riepen Saddle (Riepensattel), lies the Olperer, at 3,476 metres, the highest peak on the Tux Crest. To the northwest the terrain falls away into the Tuxer Tal, and to the southwest into the Zamser Grund. An important settlement is Hintertux, some 6 kilometres away to the north as the crow flies. The Finkenberg village of Ginzling lies just under 11 kilometres to the east.

== Sources and maps ==
- Heinrich Klier / Walter Klier: Alpine Club Guide Zillertaler Alpen, Bergverlag Rother, Munich, 1996, ISBN 3-7633-1269-2
- Eduard Amthor (ed.): Der Alpenfreund. Monatshefte für die Verbreitung von Alpenkunde unter Jung und Alt in populären und unterhaltenden Schilderungen aus dem Gesammtgebiet der Alpenwelt und mit praktischen Winken zur genußvollen Bereisung derselben, Gera 1870, page 245
- Eduard Richter (editor): Die Erschließung der Ostalpen, III Band, Verlag des Deutschen und Oesterreichischen Alpenvereins, Berlin 1894, page 101
- Alpine Club map 1:25,000 series, Sheet 35/1, Zillertaler Alpen, westliches Blatt

== Gallery ==
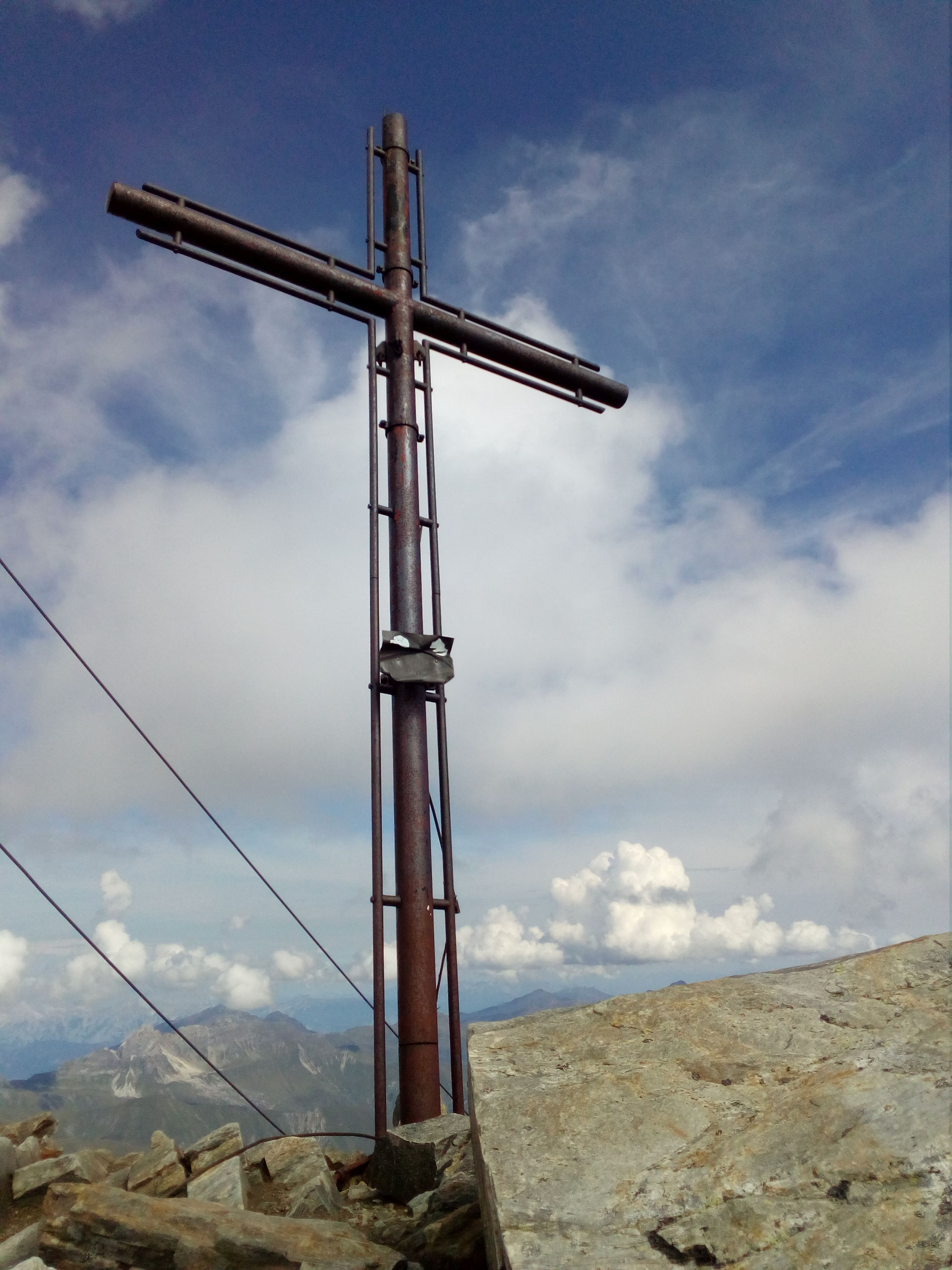
North Summit of Gefrorene Wand

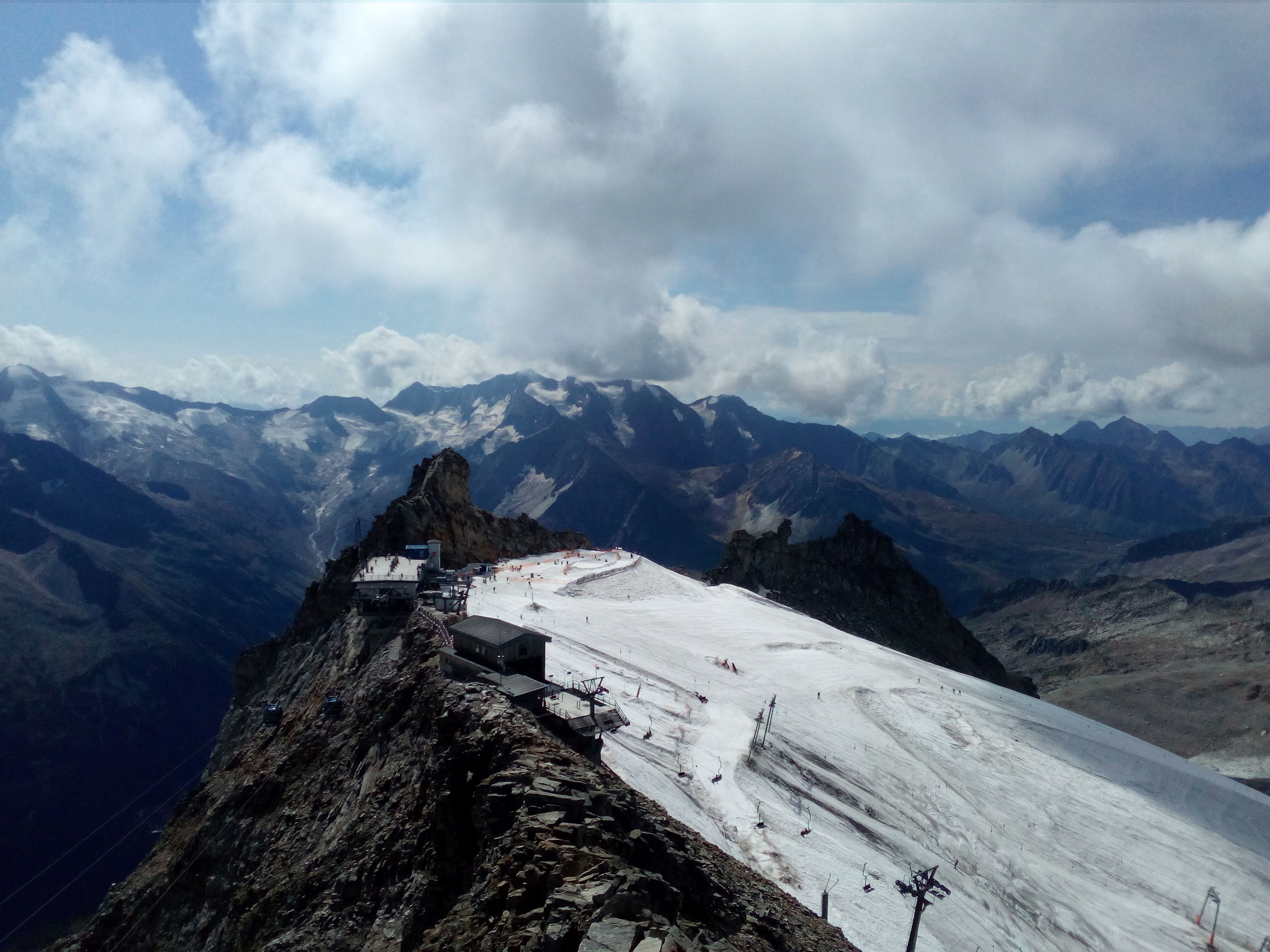
View from North Summit
