= Spannagel Cave =

Cave in Tyrol, Austria

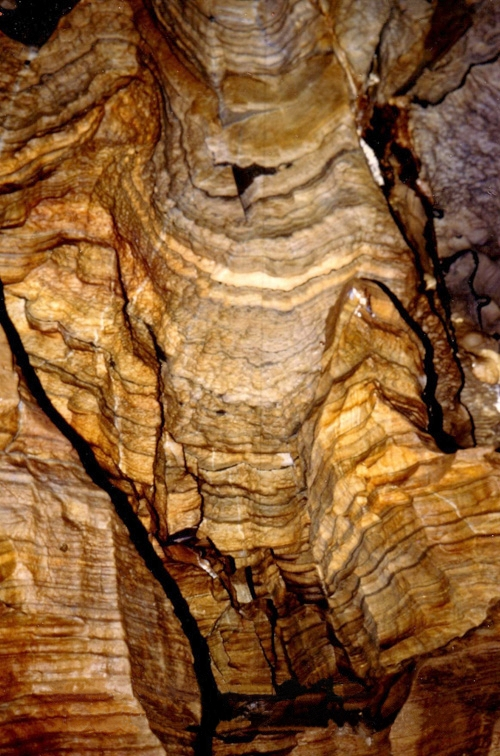
- In the Kolkgang gallery
- Interactive map of Spannagel Cave
- Location: Hintertux, Tyrol, Austria
- Coordinates: 47°04′49″N 11°40′18″E
- Length: ca. 10 km
- Elevation: 2521 m
- Discovery: 1919
- Geology: Hochstegen limestone (marble)
- Show cave opened: 1994
- Show cave length: 500 m
- Lighting: electric

The Spannagel Cave (German: Spannagelhöhle) is a show cave near Hintertux, in the Zillertal Alps in the Austrian state of Tyrol. Currently about 10 kilometres of the cave have been discovered; guided tours enable access to 500 metres of the cave. Its entrance lies below the Spannagelhaus (2531 m), a mountain hut formerly run by the Austrian Tourist Club (ÖTK). The cave and the hut are named after Dr. Rudolf Spannagel, who was the president of the ÖTK from 1902 to 1904.

== Formation ==
The overwhelming part of the Zillertal Alps consists of the crystalline primary rocks, plutons and metamorphic rock, that do not support the formation of caves. The only exceptions are pockets of rock capable of karstification such as limestone, dolomite, gypsum and other carbonates. These pockets are generally of quite low thickness, and only allow small caves to be formed. The creation of caves also requires water solubility. The Spannagel Cave has arisen in a large vein of Jurassic calcite marble of the Hochstegen Formation, a marble with over 90% total carbonate content, that runs through the slate mantle of the Western Tauern window. The formation of this extensive cave as a result of geological corrosion (and mixing corrosion) is explained by the tectonics of the region.

== Features ==
The cave is characterised by the strong presence of damps and heavy moisture penetration (even leading to cascades). The various stream passages (Mündungslöcher) form siphons in places that are only accessible by diving. In those cave passages far from daylight there are rare helictites. The Spannagel Cave System extends from the Gefrorne-Wand-Kees glacier to the Lärmstange, 2,686 m, and is the highest large cave in Europe with a measured length to date of 10 kilometres. During guided tours, the cave's many features (coloured marble, various calc-sinter formations, speleothems, crystals, banded marbles and kolks) are explained. In addition, the age of the cave and its formation are described, as are its flora and fauna, climate and cave atmosphere which is beneficial for those suffering from lung ailments. Bats only appear in the vicinity of the cave exits - albeit some get lost in the entrance area. A cave museum has been established in the eastern section of this passageway where several discoveries from the interior of the mountain are displayed.

== Discovery ==
In 1919 Alois Hotter, the proprietor of the Spannagelhaus, discovered the cave entrance. He called the cave the Grausliches Loch and used it, as did several other tenants after him, as a rubbish pit.

In 1960 Rudolf Radislovich first explored the front part of the cave with its main entrance (Hauptgang) and "water entrance" (Wassergang), both of which meet in the Hall of Union (Halle der Vereinigung). In the following year, Max H. Fink surveyed the known section of the cave and discovered the Labyrinth. In 1964 the Federal Monuments Office (Bundesdenkmalamt) designated the cave as a natural monument because of its scientific importance. In 1968 Walter Knezicek and Günther J. Wolf discovered two shafts and the Knesi-Harnisch at the right hand edge of the Halle der Vereinigung, which all led down into a tunnel about 10 metres below. This was the start of what later became known as the Schrauben-Cañon ("Screw Canyon"). In 1970 Hannes Jodl found the Postkastl ("Postbox") at the left hand end of the Halle der Vereinigung, which turned out to be a continuation of the Spannagel Cave. The first person to enter this section was Günther J. Wolf with seven members of his ice course. The research of the Kolkgang passage (ascending to the Elchschädelgang passage and Dirndlkammer chamber, a link with the Wassergang, and descending via the Kolkgang to the Hannes-Jodl-Dom, at whose ceiling the Schrauben-Cañon enters, onwards to the Dr.-Klaus-Karger-Halle and continuing as the Kolkgang to the edge of the ÖTK-Schacht shaft) resulted in a doubling of the hitherto known extent of the cave and offered an incentive for further exploration.

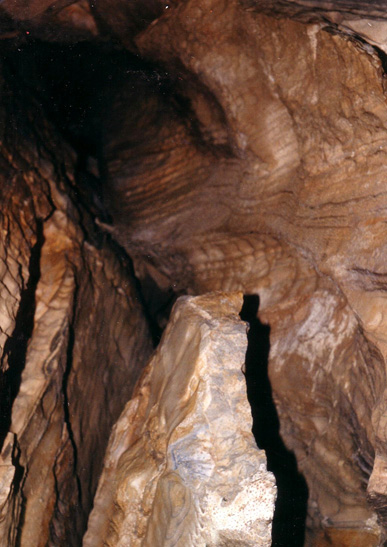
The Schrauben-Cañon canyon.

The years 1972 to 1975 saw four survey expeditions by the State Caving Club in Tyrol (Landesverein für Höhlenkunde in Tirol), that advanced as far as the Gneisbach stream. In 1975, as part of a research week by the Groupe Spéléologique Luxembourgeois with E. Jacoby, M. Möller, G. Mutschlechner and B. Schmitz, the course of the Höhlenbach stream was established. By dying the water it was demonstrated that it surfaced at about 1,980 m in the middle of a rock face south of Waldeben. Likewise the Schneefleck Cave (Schneefleckhöhle), which runs parallel to the Spannagel Cave, was discovered and surveyed. In 1976 the Caving Club erected a bivouac in the Umkehrhalle hall. A 50-hour expedition led by E. Jacoby in 1976/77 discovered and researched the Spinnengang passage, the Mutschlechner-Dom cavern and the Schatzkammer chamber. In 1978 F. Maiberger and W. Mayr reached the westernmost point of the cave, the Bauchbad.

In 1984 German speleologists in the Tyrolean Caving Club under the direction of C. Cavelius surveyed the South System (Südsystem). In 1987 and 1988 the entrance area of the cave was cleared out, and the gallery joining the Trümmerhalle and Gneisbach were discovered and surveyed by W. Mayr and G. Völkl. The Schrauben-Cañon was first negotiated in 1989 by E. Türke and R. Tobitsch.

== Sources ==
- Max H. Fink (1961): Die Höhle unter dem Spannagelhaus. – Österr. Touristenzeitung (Vienna) 74 (6): 70
- Günther J. Wolf (1971): Bergfahrt in die Unterwelt. – Österr. Touristenzeitung (Vienna) 84 (2): 24-25
- Gerhard Schirmer (1976): Die Höhle beim Spannagelhaus. – Österr. Touristenzeitung (Vienna) 88 (9): 109-111
- Heinz Ilming, Hans Mrkos (1979): Höhlenforschung in Österreich seit 1961. – Wissenschaftliche Beihefte zur Zeitschrift "Die Höhle" (Vienna) 13: 67-81
- Gerhard Schirmer (1979): Die Höhle unter dem Spannagelhaus. – Festschrift "50 Jahre Bergsteigergruppe im Österr. Touristenklub" (Vienna) 123-125
- Ernest Jacoby, Günter Krejci (1992): Die Höhle beim Spannagelhaus und ihre Umgebung. – Wissenschaftliche Beihefte zur Zeitschrift "Die Höhle" 26
