= Hoher Riffler (Zillertal Alps) =

Mountain

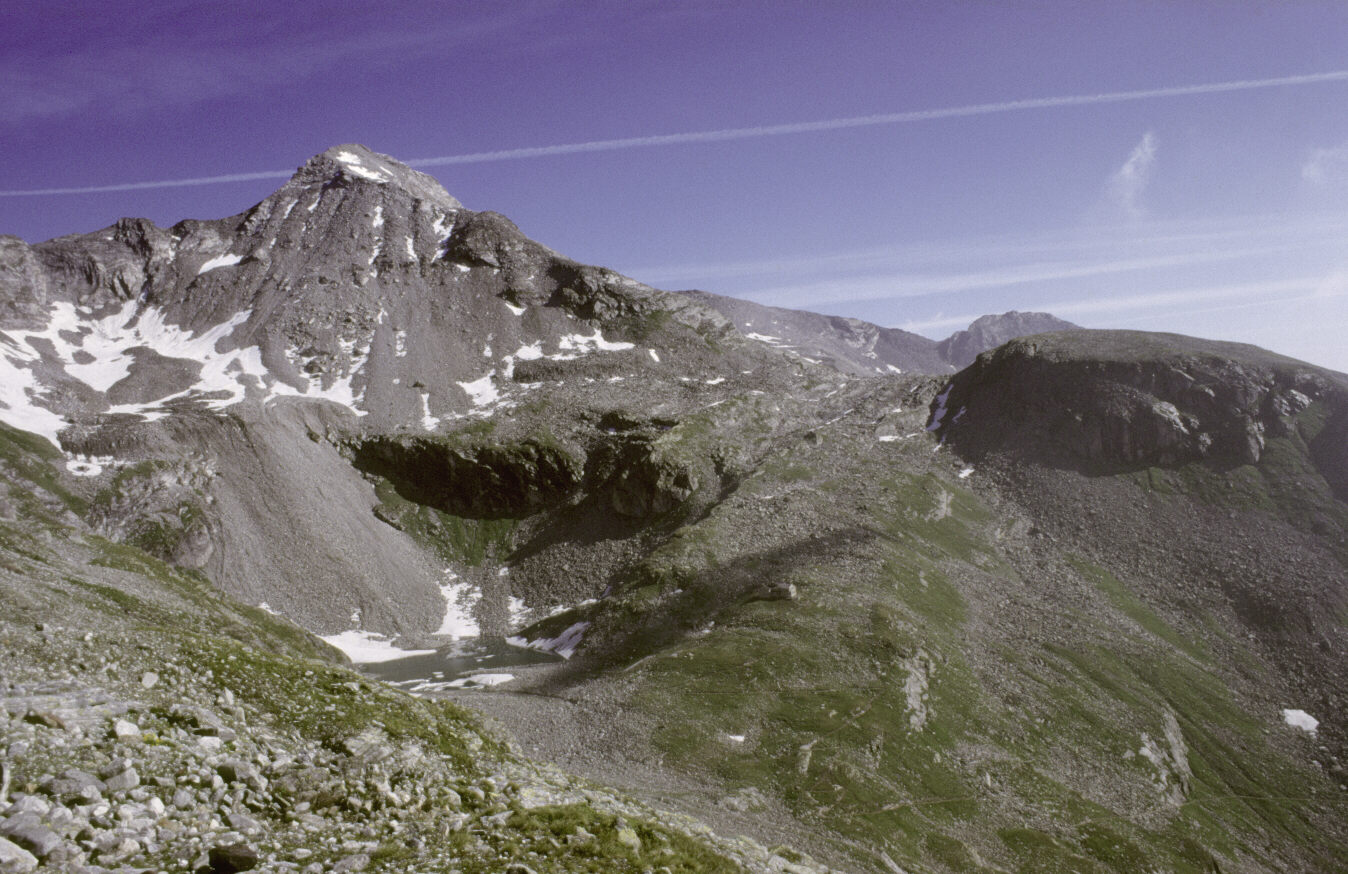
- The Hoher Riffler with the Friesenbergsee lake and Friesenberghaus

Highest point
- Elevation: 3,231 m (AA) (10,600 ft)
- Prominence: 321
- Listing: Alpine mountains above 3000 m
- Coordinates: 47°04′53″N 11°42′15″E

Geography
- Location within Austria
- Location: Tyrol, Austria
- Parent range: Zillertal Alps

Climbing
- First ascent: in 1864 during the state survey
- Normal route: Southwest ridge (Südwestgrat), grade I

The Hoher Riffler is a 3,231 metre high mountain in the Zillertal Alps, on the eastern part of the main chain of the Tux (Tuxer Hauptkamm), in the Austrian state of Tyrol. The peak is firn-covered on its northern side, but from the south it looks like a rocky summit. Ridges run from the top towards the southwest, north, northeast and southeast, some of them carrying approach paths. The summit is easily attained from the mountain hut of Spannagelhaus to the west or the Friesenberghaus to the south and, as a result, is often visited. In winter it is an easy destination for ski mountaineers. The peak was first ascended during the Austrian national survey. The first tourist climber, according to the literature, was one H. Weber, guided by Georg Samer in 1875.

== Surrounding area ==
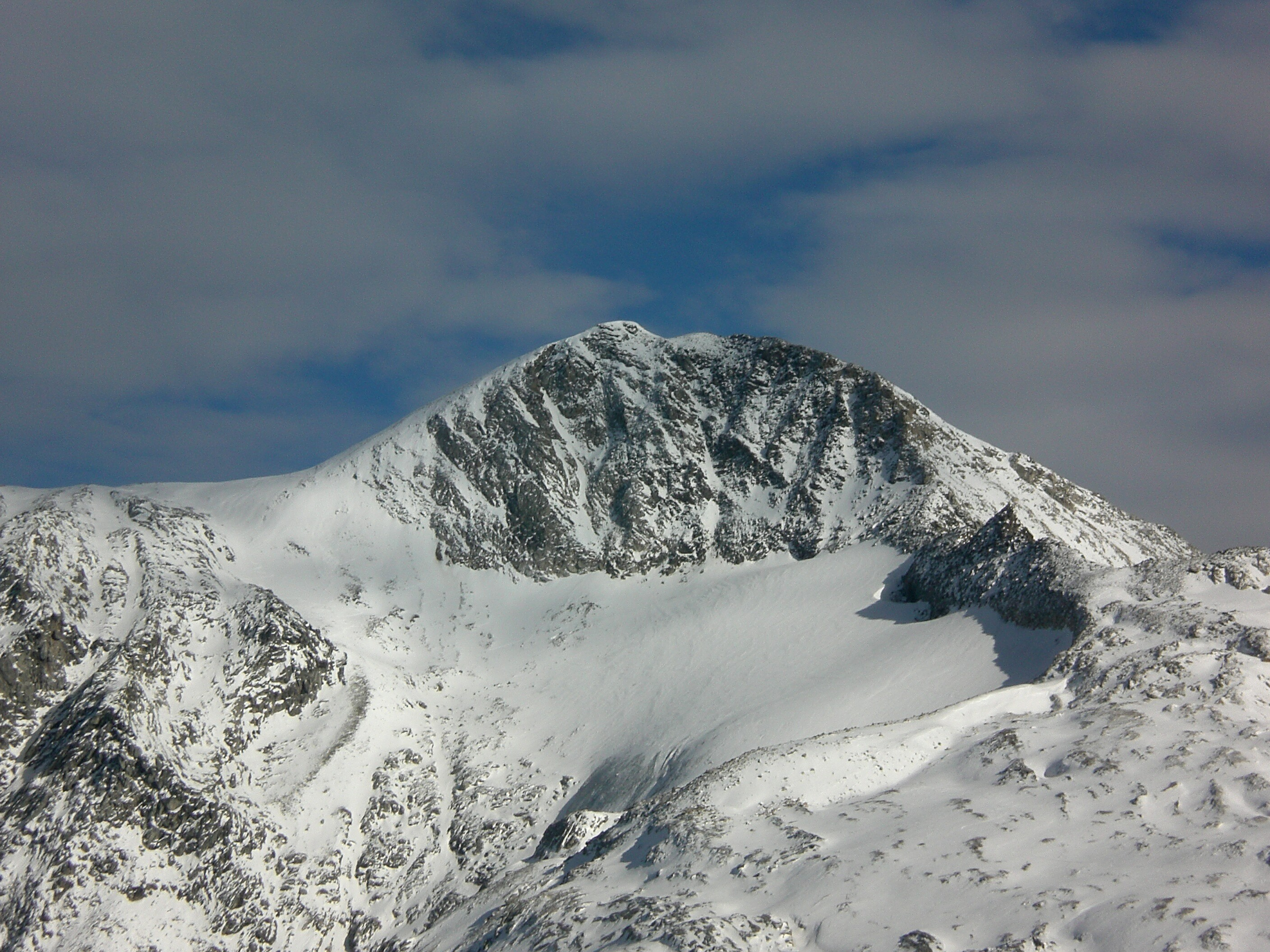
The summit block of the Hoher Riffler from the west; in front the Schwarzbrunnerkees glacier

The Zillertal Riffler (Zillertaler Riffler) is only enclosed by glaciers to the north and west. To the north the Federbettkees starts just below the summit whilst, to the west, is the much smaller Schwarzbrunnerkees. To the southeast are the remnants of the Rifflerkees, which has largely retreated due to global warming. Amongst the neighbouring peaks are the twin summits of the Gefrorene-Wand-Spitzen (3,288 m) along the southwest ridge (Südwestgrat) on the other side of the 2,904 m high wind gap of the Friesenbergscharte. On the other side of the Federbettkees, along the north ridge (Nordgrat) which swings northeast, lie the Griererkarspitze (2,968 m), Napfspitze (2,925 m) and die 3,038 metre high Realspitze, separated by the col of Obere Rifflerscharte (2,968 m), Along the southeast ridge (Südostgrat), above the Wesendlekarsees glacier (surface at 2,375 m) and separated by the 2,774 m high col of Untere Rifflerscharte, is the Kleine Riffler (2,835 m). The nearest important settlement is the winter sports resort of Hintertux about four kilometres northwest as the crow flies.

== Bases and routes ==
The Friesenberghaus (2,498 m) is the base for an ice-free climb along the south ridge (Südgrat). The base for an approach via the Friesenbergscharte gap and southwest ridge (Südwestgrat) is the Spannagelhaus. Both routes are similar and of climbing grade UIAA I and count as the normal route. According to the literature, it takes about 2 1/2 hours to reach the summit cross from the Friesenberghaus and somewhat less time from the Spannagelhaus. In winter the climb can be done as an easy ski tour.

== Sources and maps ==
- Heinrich Klier/Walter Klier: Alpine Club Guide Zillertaler Alpen, Munich, 1996, ISBN 3-7633-1269-2
- Alpine Club map, 1:25,000 series, Zillertaler Alpen, West, Sheet 35/1
