= Garnet Chapel =

Catholic chapel in Austria

Coordinates: 47°10′16″N 11°48′16″E

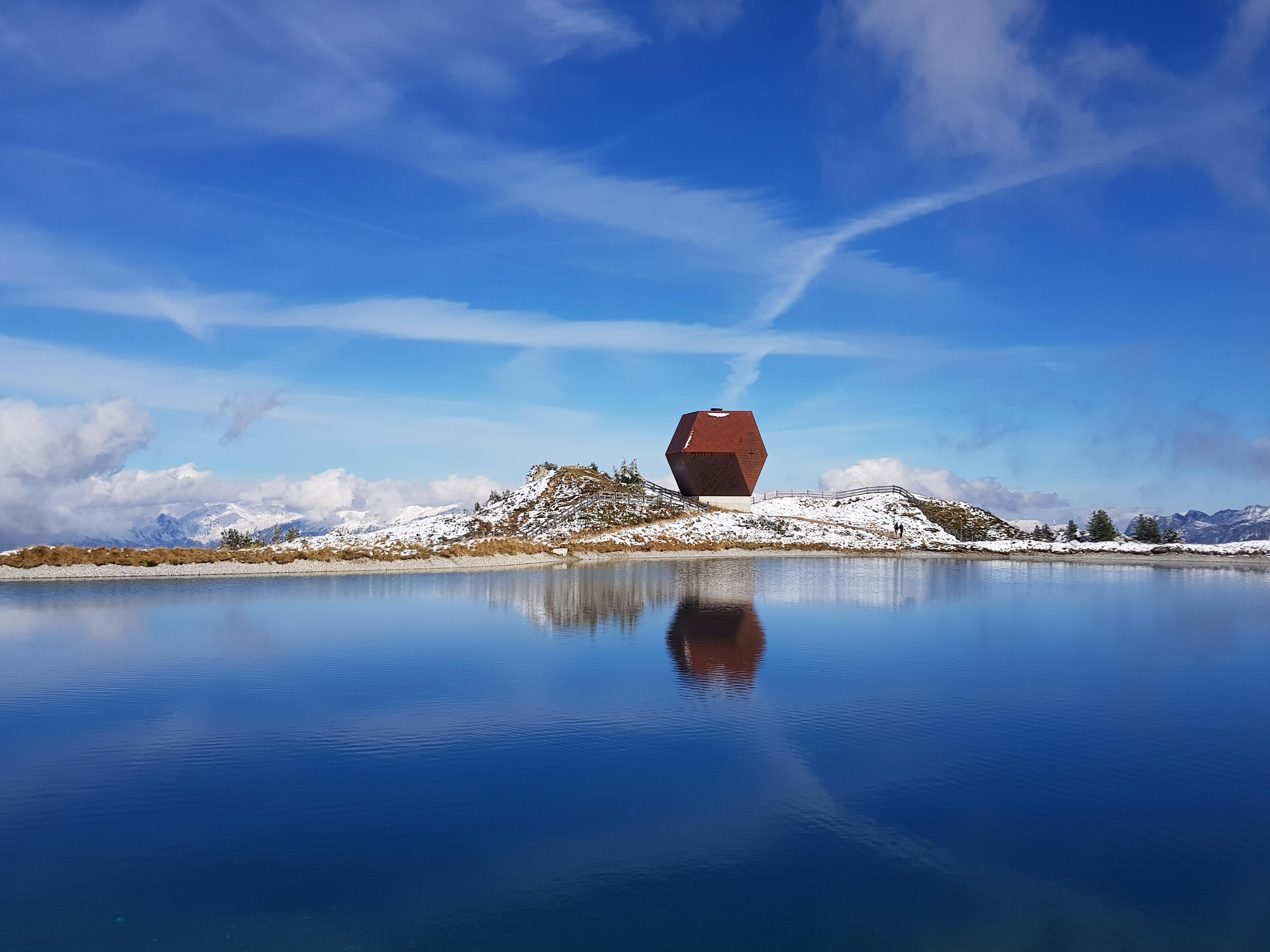

Location
- Location: Finkenberg, Zillertal, Tyrol, Austria in the European Union
- Interactive map of Garnet Chapel

Architecture
- Architect: Mario Botta
- Style: modern
- Groundbreaking: 2013
- Completed: 2013

The Garnet Chapel, also known as the Capella Granata (German: Granatkapelle), is a Catholic chapel situated at the Penken saddle (German: the Penkenjoch) near the Penken. It is northeast of an artificial lake and forms part of the community of Finkenberg in the Zillertal valley. The valley in the district of Schwaz is in the state (Bundesland) of Tyrol. The chapel belongs to the parish of Finkenberg and by extension to the Deanery of Fuegen-Jenbach and thus to the Roman Catholic Diocese of Innsbruck.

The chapel is dedicated to Engelbert Kolland, a friar of the Franciscan Order (OFM), who was beatified on 10 October 1926. Father Kolland was born in Ramsau, a small village in the Zillertal. Kolland will be canonised by Pope Francis on October 20, 2024, among the 14 blesseds.

== Location ==
The chapel is situated at approximately 2087 masl, about 40 metres northeast of the artificial Penken lake (German: Speicherteich Penken). The linear distance between chapel and village centre of Finkenberg amounts to approx 2,000 metres and about four kilometres to Mayrhofen, a town in the east, whereas it is about 6.5 kilometres to Ramsau in the Zillertal, a village in the northeast.

== History ==
In the years 2011 and 2012 plans to build the chapel were established, and on 10 July 2012 negotiations on how to realize the construction were held. This day was the exact date of death of the beatified Engelbert Kolland. On 17 June 2013 construction work started. After it was finished, various clerics of the Catholic Church then inaugurated the religious building on 22 September 2013, the very day that the beatified Engelbert Kolland had been baptized.

== Building ==
The chapel was constructed in the name of the Brindlinger family and planned by Mario Botta, a Swiss architect. In earlier times this family had earned a living by mining for garnets. Therefore, obviously the idea occurred to build this chapel in the form of a garnet.

The religious building is a free-standing, two-storey wood construction in the form of a garnet that is open onto all sides. It is situated on a prominent rock and disposes of twelve identical rhomboid surfaces (rhombic dodecahedron). Weathering steel is used on the outside to shield the wooden construction. The entrance as well as the vestry and information on the life of Engelbert Kolland can be found on the ground floor. The chapel itself is located on the first floor. Its interior is lined with mainly regional larch wood.

The glass dome produces interesting light effects on the ceiling. The altar made of walnut wood and a portrait of the beatified Engelbert Kolland were created by Markus Thurner, born in 1970 in Maurach am Achensee (by the Achen Lake). The portrait is a wooden mosaique which consists of five different regional types of wood from maple, cherry, apple and pear trees as well as walnut.

== Hiking route ==
The chapel can be reached on foot from the top station of the Finkenberg gondola lift, the Finkenberger Almbahnen, in about 10 minutes.

== Literature ==
- Josef Brindlinger, Petrus Schüler OFM: …und manchmal stellt es sich sogar heraus, dass es ein Schatz ist, in: Im Land des Herrn, Franziskanische Zeitschrift für das Heilige Land, 74. Jahrgang, Heft 4, 2020, S. 23 ff.
- Gottfried Egger: Zwischen Glocke und Minarett: Das Leben des Engelbert Kolland, Salzburg 2010, Verlag Anton Pustet.
