= 2013 Critérium du Dauphiné =

2013 UCI World Tour, race 16 of 29

Race details
- Dates: 2–9 June 2013
- Stages: 8
- Distance: 1,136.5 km (706.2 mi)
- Winning time: 29h 28' 46"

Results
Jersey awarded to the overall winner	Winner	Chris Froome (Great Britain)	(Team Sky)
	Second	Richie Porte (Australia)	(Team Sky)
	Third	Daniel Moreno (Spain)	(Team Katusha)
Jersey awarded to the points classification winner	Points	Gianni Meersman (Belgium)	(Omega Pharma–Quick-Step)
Jersey awarded to the mountains classification winner	Mountains	Thomas Damuseau (France)	(Argos–Shimano)
Jersey awarded to the young rider classification winner	Young rider	Rohan Dennis (Australia)	(Garmin–Sharp)
	Team	Team Sky	

The 2013 Critérium du Dauphiné was the 65th running of the Critérium du Dauphiné cycling stage race; a race, organised by the Amaury Sport Organisation, rated as a World Tour event on the UCI calendar, the highest classification such an event can have. The race consisted of eight stages, beginning in Champéry on 2 June – the first such start for the race in Switzerland – and concluding in Risoul on 9 June, and was the sixteenth race of the 2013 UCI World Tour season. The Dauphiné was viewed as a great preparation for July's Tour de France and a number of the contenders for the general classification of the Tour participated in the Dauphiné. It featured mountainous stages as well as an individual time trial similar in length to the Tour.

The race was won by Great Britain's Chris Froome of Team Sky – the third successive year that the squad had won the race, after Bradley Wiggins' victories in 2011 and 2012. Froome took the overall lead of the race after winning the fifth stage, and maintained his advantage to the end of the race to win his fourth stage race of the 2013 season. Ultimately, Froome won the general classification by 58 seconds over runner-up and team-mate Richie Porte, a domestique for Froome in the mountainous stages on the route. The podium was completed by Daniel Moreno of Team Katusha, who finished 74 seconds in arrears of Porte, and two minutes 12 seconds behind Froome.

In the race's other classifications, Garmin–Sharp's Rohan Dennis was the winner of the white jersey for the young rider classification as he was the highest placed rider born in 1988 or later, finishing in eighth place overall. Despite not winning any stages during the race, Gianni Meersman of Omega Pharma–Quick-Step won the green jersey, for the winner of the points classification – gained at intermediate sprints and stage finishes – while the red and white polka-dotted jersey for the King of the Mountains classification went to Argos–Shimano rider Thomas Damuseau. The teams classification was comfortably won by Team Sky for the second year in a row; they were over twelve minutes clear of the next best team, Saxo–Tinkoff.

== Teams ==
As the Critérium du Dauphiné was a UCI World Tour event, all UCI ProTeams were invited automatically and obligated to send a squad. Originally, eighteen ProTeams were invited to the race, with four other squads given wildcard places. Team Katusha were not originally invited to the race, but when they later regained their ProTour status after an appeal to the Court of Arbitration for Sport, the race organisers announced their inclusion, bringing the total number of teams competing to twenty-three.

During May's Giro d'Italia, Sylvain Georges tested positive for the vasodilator heptaminol, after the seventh stage; his positive test was the second by a rider from the Ag2r–La Mondiale squad in the space of a year, after Steve Houanard tested positive for the glycoprotein hormone erythropoietin (EPO) in an out-of-competition test in September 2012. Since the team was a member of the Mouvement pour un cyclisme crédible union, a second positive test meant that, according to the union's regulations, they had to stop racing for eight days. The team voluntarily withdrew from the Dauphiné, avoiding a financial penalty which could have been incurred by the team for failing to compete in a World Tour event, against UCI regulations. As a result, the peloton was reduced to the following twenty-two teams.

- Argos–Shimano
- Astana
- Blanco Pro Cycling
- BMC Racing Team
- Bretagne–Séché Environnement
- Cannondale
- Cofidis
- Team Europcar
- Euskaltel–Euskadi
- FDJ
- Garmin–Sharp
- Team Katusha
- Lampre–Merida
- Lotto–Belisol
- Movistar Team
- NetApp–Endura
- Omega Pharma–Quick-Step
- Orica–GreenEDGE
- RadioShack–Leopard
- Saxo–Tinkoff
- Team Sky
- Vacansoleil–DCM

Among the 176-rider starting peloton was only one previous winner of the race: Alejandro Valverde, the winner of the race in 2008 and 2009, led the Movistar Team.

== Schedule ==
The route for the race was announced on 15 April 2013.

Stage	Route	Distance	Type	Date	Winner
1	Champéry (Switzerland) to Champéry (Switzerland)	121 km (75.2 mi)	Medium-mountain stage	2 June	David Veilleux (CAN)
2	Châtel to Oyonnax	191 km (118.7 mi)	Flat stage	3 June	Elia Viviani (ITA)
3	Ambérieu-en-Bugey to Tarare	167 km (103.8 mi)	Flat stage	4 June	Edvald Boasson Hagen (NOR)
4	Villars-les-Dombes to Parc des Oiseaux	32.5 km (20.2 mi)	Individual time trial	5 June	Tony Martin (GER)
5	Grésy-sur-Aix to Valmorel	139 km (86.4 mi)	Medium-mountain stage	6 June	Chris Froome (GBR)
6	La Léchère to Grenoble	143 km (88.9 mi)	Flat stage	7 June	Thomas Voeckler (FRA)
7	Le Pont-de-Claix to SuperDévoluy	187.5 km (116.5 mi)	Medium-mountain stage	8 June	Samuel Sánchez (ESP)
8	Sisteron to Risoul	155.5 km (96.6 mi)	Medium-mountain stage	9 June	Alessandro De Marchi (ITA)

== Stages ==
=== Stage 1 ===
2 June 2013 — Champéry (Switzerland) to Champéry (Switzerland), 121 km (75.2 mi)

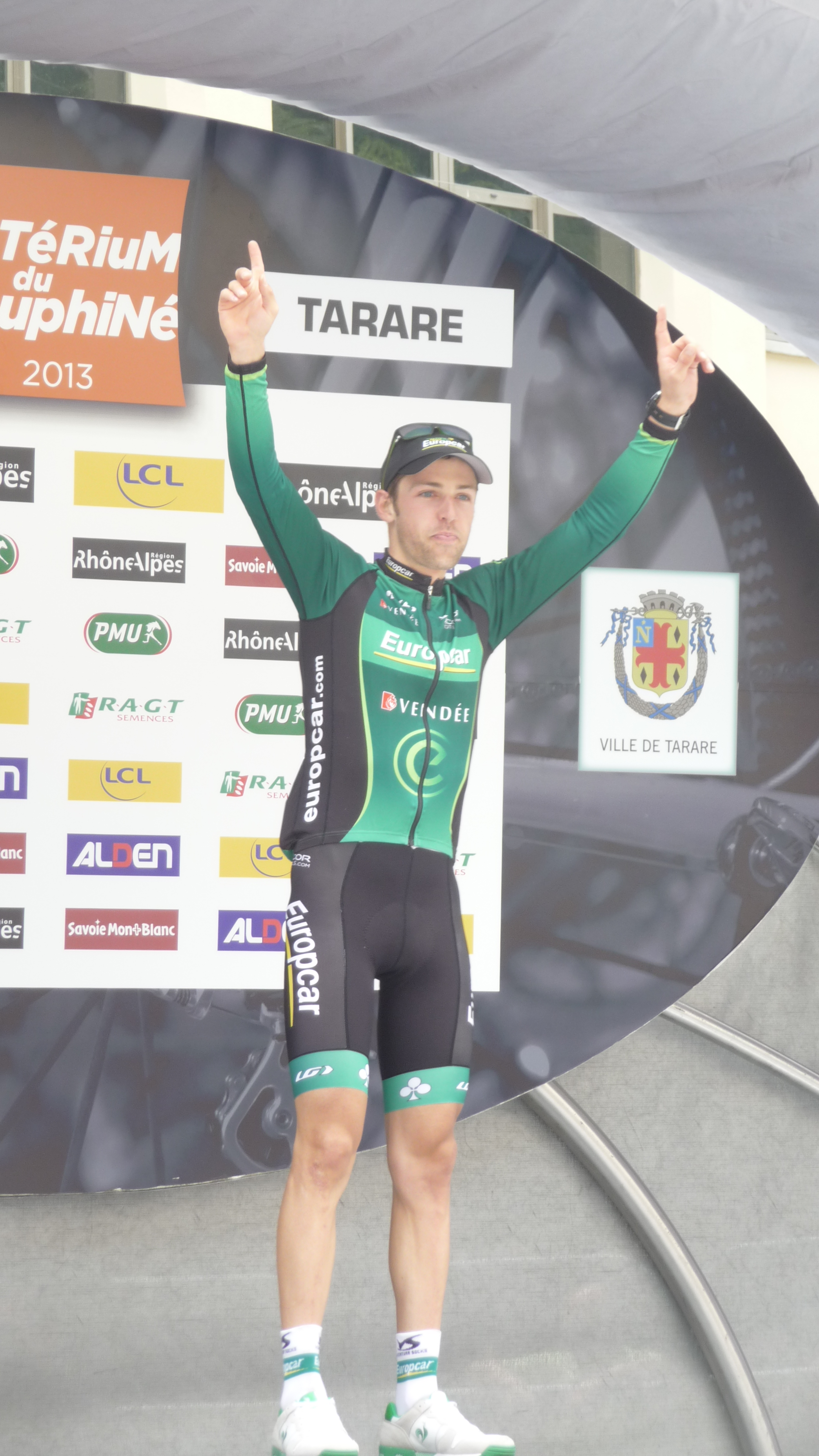
Team Europcar's David Veilleux – pictured after the race's third stage – achieved his first victory at World Tour level, soloing to victory by over 90 seconds.

Despite starting and finishing in the village of Champéry – the first occasion that the race had started in Switzerland in its history – most of the opening stage of the 2013 Critérium du Dauphiné was just over the Franco-Swiss border in the Haute-Savoie department, where the previous year's race had finished. After a slight descent from the start, the race's first climb commenced after just 3.3 km (2.1 mi) of racing, with the first-category Côte de Morgins, a 9.2 km (5.7 mi)-long, 6% climb. After a long and steady descent, another first-category climb of the Col du Corbier – which featured in the 2012 Dauphiné-ending stage – was ascented, a 7.6 km (4.7 mi) test at an average of 7.5%. On the return loop to Champéry, after passing through the intermediate sprint at La Chapelle-d'Abondance, the Côte de Morgins was climbed from the other side (this time as a second-category climb), before a third-category climb – the Côte de Champéry – just a kilometre from the finish. This 121 km (75.2 mi) parcours, especially the closing kilometres, was expected to see sprinters being dropped from the peloton, resulting in a select group of riders at the finish.

The day's breakaway was initiated at the front of the day's opening climb, the Côte de Morgins, with the initial move being made by Team Europcar rider David Veilleux. Veilleux was later joined by Euskaltel–Euskadi's Ricardo García, Argos–Shimano rider Thomas Damuseau and Jean-Marc Bideau of Bretagne–Séché Environnement, and the quartet built up a maximum lead on the road of around ten minutes. Behind them, Tony Martin (Omega Pharma–Quick-Step) set off in pursuit of the four leaders, but was not able to reach the lead group at any point. Veilleux attacked on the Col du Corbier, and managed to break away by 40 seconds from García and Damuseau – Bideau had been dropped earlier on the climb – in 2 km (1.2 mi) to the top of the climb. Veilleux remained well clear into the closing stages, and eventually came across the line to take the biggest win of his career – his first win at World Tour level – by almost two minutes. In doing so, Veilleux claimed the race lead in the general, points and mountains classifications. The remaining members of the breakaway were caught, and this allowed Martin's team-mate Gianni Meersman to take second, ahead of Blanco Pro Cycling's Tom-Jelte Slagter, who was the best-placed young rider.

Stage 1 Result and General Classification after Stage 1

	Rider	Team	Time
1	David Veilleux (CAN)	Team Europcar	3h 17' 35"
2	Gianni Meersman (BEL)	Omega Pharma–Quick-Step	+ 1' 56"
3	Tom-Jelte Slagter (NED)	Blanco Pro Cycling	+ 1' 57"
4	Richie Porte (AUS)	Team Sky	+ 1' 57"
5	Chris Froome (GBR)	Team Sky	+ 1' 57"
6	Ángel Madrazo (ESP)	Movistar Team	+ 1' 57"
7	Jakob Fuglsang (DEN)	Astana	+ 1' 57"
8	Alejandro Valverde (ESP)	Movistar Team	+ 1' 57"
9	Tony Gallopin (FRA)	RadioShack–Leopard	+ 1' 57"
10	Leopold König (CZE)	NetApp–Endura	+ 1' 57"

=== Stage 2 ===
3 June 2013 — Châtel to Oyonnax, 191 km (118.7 mi)

Although categorised as a flat stage by the race organisers, the second half of the 191 km (118.7 mi) parcours was set to test whether the sprinters could with remain with the peloton all the way to the finish in Oyonnax. Five of the day's six categorised climbs came in a 60 km (37.3 mi) portion of the route, with the last of these – the second-category Col du Sentier – coming with just 11.5 km (7.1 mi) remaining of the stage. The Col du Sentier was the day's steepest climb, with an average gradient of 7.6%, and was one of two second-category ascents, along with the 5.6 km (3.5 mi)-long Côte de Communal (6.3%) around 30 km (18.6 mi) prior. The descent into Oyonnax was fast, before a gradual rise to the finish.

Four separate riders attempted to make solo breakaways early in the stage, but it was not until the 22 km (13.7 mi) point that a group was able to separate from the peloton. For the second day running, Argos–Shimano rider Thomas Damuseau was in the breakaway, with the main aim of taking the mountains classification lead away from overall leader David Veilleux of Team Europcar. Joining Damuseau in the group initially were Bretagne–Séché Environnement's Arnaud Gérard and Cofidis rider Rudy Molard, while a fourth rider, José Mendes (NetApp–Endura), was able to bridge up to the group from the peloton. With three-quarters of the group being within two minutes of Veilleux after the opening stage, the peloton were unwilling to give the group too much distance on the road, and the gap peaked at no more than five minutes, just after halfway.

Veilleux's team maintained the pace in the peloton, pulling the group back as Damuseau led the leaders over the top of the first four climbs, but the quartet held a lead of less than a minute at the foot of the Côte du Bugnon. Molard attacked his companions, and pulled the advantage out to just over a minute, while the others were brought back by the peloton, now being led by Omega Pharma–Quick-Step. Molard's resistance lasted until the bottom of the final climb, the Col du Sentier, when the peloton sped by. His team-mate Rein Taaramäe attacked on the climb itself, remaining clear to around 2.5 km (1.6 mi) from the finish of the stage. Cannondale had led the chase, and also led the field into the final kilometre for their sprinter Elia Viviani, and after navigating the hairpin bend with 600 metres (2,000 ft) left, Viviani was the strongest in the sprint and took his first win of 2013 ahead of Omega Pharma–Quick-Step's Gianni Meersman, who finished second for the second day running. Veilleux finished within the peloton to maintain his race lead by 1' 56" over Meersman.

Stage 2 Result

	Rider	Team	Time
1	Elia Viviani (ITA)	Cannondale	4h 39' 15"
2	Gianni Meersman (BEL)	Omega Pharma–Quick-Step	s.t.
3	Tony Gallopin (FRA)	RadioShack–Leopard	s.t.
4	Reinardt Janse van Rensburg (RSA)	Argos–Shimano	s.t.
5	Anthony Geslin (FRA)	FDJ	s.t.
6	Armindo Fonseca (FRA)	Bretagne–Séché Environnement	s.t.
7	Bram Tankink (NED)	Blanco Pro Cycling	s.t.
8	Warren Barguil (FRA)	Argos–Shimano	s.t.
9	Juan Antonio Flecha (ESP)	Vacansoleil–DCM	s.t.
10	Wesley Sulzberger (AUS)	Orica–GreenEDGE	s.t.

General Classification after Stage 2

	Rider	Team	Time
1	David Veilleux (CAN)	Team Europcar	7h 56' 50"
2	Gianni Meersman (BEL)	Omega Pharma–Quick-Step	+ 1' 56"
3	Tony Gallopin (FRA)	RadioShack–Leopard	+ 1' 57"
4	Warren Barguil (FRA)	Argos–Shimano	+ 1' 57"
5	Alejandro Valverde (ESP)	Movistar Team	+ 1' 57"
6	Jakob Fuglsang (DEN)	Astana	+ 1' 57"
7	Chris Froome (GBR)	Team Sky	+ 1' 57"
8	Richie Porte (AUS)	Team Sky	+ 1' 57"
9	Ángel Madrazo (ESP)	Movistar Team	+ 1' 57"
10	Geraint Thomas (GBR)	Team Sky	+ 1' 57"

=== Stage 3 ===
4 June 2013 — Ambérieu-en-Bugey to Tarare, 167 km (103.8 mi)

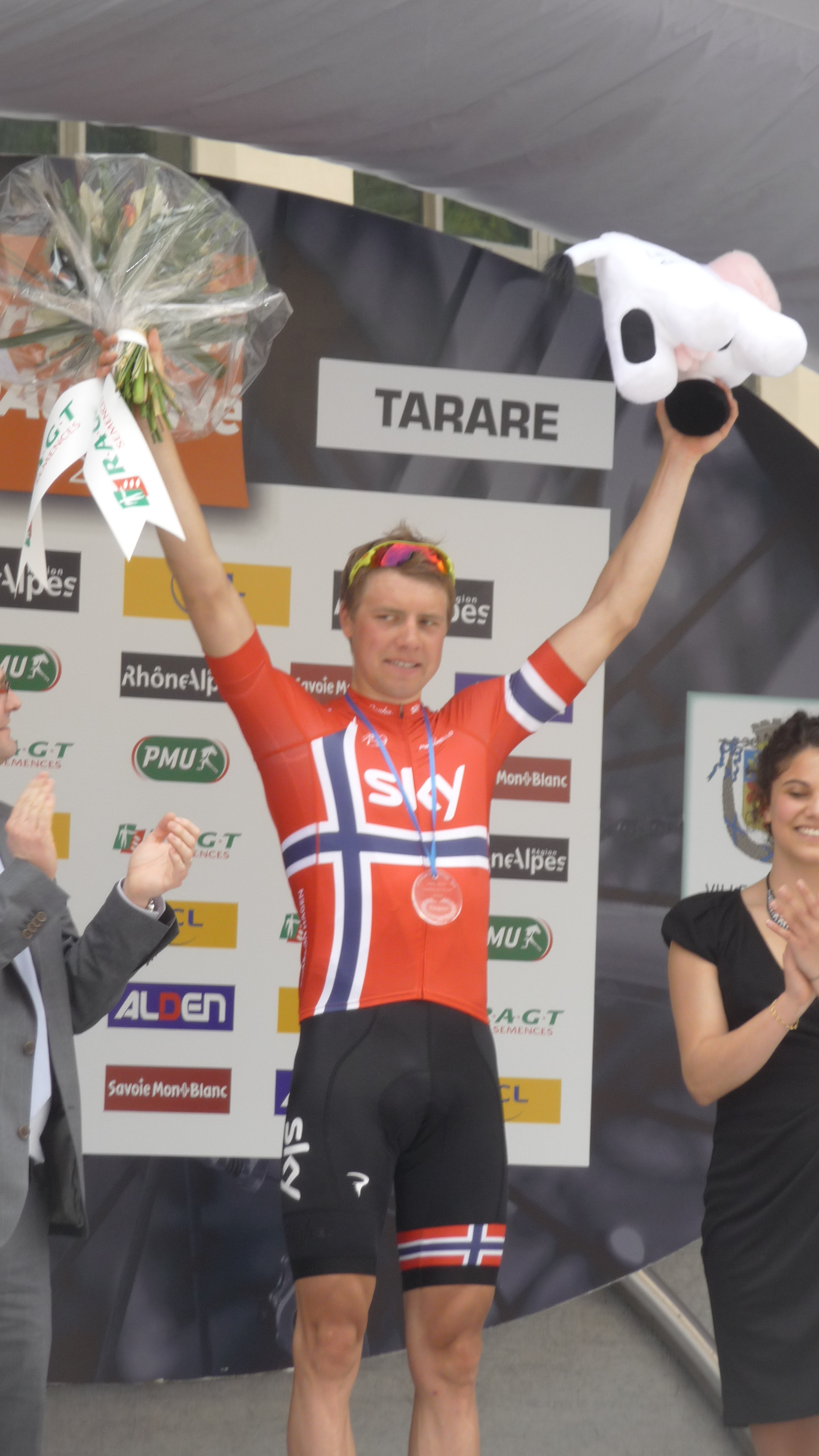
The winner of the stage, Edvald Boasson Hagen of Team Sky, on the podium in Tarare.

The third stage of the race was split into two distinctive sections; the first portion of the 167 km (103.8 mi)-long stage from the start town of Ambérieu-en-Bugey was predominantly flat as the race headed towards the feeding zone in the commune of Lancié. From there, the route moved uphill towards the first of the day's two categorised climbs. The Col des Echarmeaux was a long, but rolling climb of 3% over 10.5 km (6.5 mi), with a steady descent towards the intermediate sprint point, coming 25 km (15.5 mi) before the finish, in the commune of Cublize. The route descended a little further, before the Col des Sauvages, a third-category climb at an average gradient over 4 km (2.5 mi) of 5.5%. The summit of the climb came 10 km (6.2 mi) before the finish into Tarare; the finish was technical, with two tight left-hand turns in the final kilometre.

Four riders broke clear of the main field almost immediately after the race rolled out of Ambérieu-en-Bugey, with Fumiyuki Beppu (Orica–GreenEDGE) being joined in the breakaway by Garmin–Sharp rider Jacob Rathe, Sander Cordeel of Lotto–Belisol and Vacansoleil–DCM's Juan Antonio Flecha. The quartet pulled clear to a maximum advantage of around seven minutes early in the stage. This was steadily brought down by the team-mates of the race leader David Veilleux (Team Europcar) and the Omega Pharma–Quick-Step team for their sprinter Gianni Meersman. FDJ also aided with the chase for Nacer Bouhanni, and the peloton was within a minute of the leaders at the intermediate sprint in Cublize. Cordeel was the last member of the group to be caught, just as he commenced the Col des Sauvages. After several solo attacks were pulled back by Omega Pharma–Quick-Step, it set up the final sprint in Tarare. With a lead-out from team-mate Geraint Thomas, Edvald Boasson Hagen finished strongest to take the stage win – the third Dauphiné win of his career – ahead of Orica–GreenEDGE's Michael Matthews and Meersman.

Stage 3 Result

	Rider	Team	Time
1	Edvald Boasson Hagen (NOR)	Team Sky	4h 03' 32"
2	Michael Matthews (AUS)	Orica–GreenEDGE	s.t.
3	Gianni Meersman (BEL)	Omega Pharma–Quick-Step	s.t.
4	Thor Hushovd (NOR)	BMC Racing Team	s.t.
5	Elia Viviani (ITA)	Cannondale	s.t.
6	Reinardt Janse van Rensburg (RSA)	Argos–Shimano	s.t.
7	Nacer Bouhanni (FRA)	FDJ	s.t.
8	Paul Voss (GER)	NetApp–Endura	s.t.
9	Sylvain Chavanel (FRA)	Omega Pharma–Quick-Step	s.t.
10	Francesco Gavazzi (ITA)	Astana	s.t.

General Classification after Stage 3

	Rider	Team	Time
1	David Veilleux (CAN)	Team Europcar	12h 00' 22"
2	Gianni Meersman (BEL)	Omega Pharma–Quick-Step	+ 1' 56"
3	Tony Gallopin (FRA)	RadioShack–Leopard	+ 1' 57"
4	Alejandro Valverde (ESP)	Movistar Team	+ 1' 57"
5	Warren Barguil (FRA)	Argos–Shimano	+ 1' 57"
6	Jakob Fuglsang (DEN)	Astana	+ 1' 57"
7	Geraint Thomas (GBR)	Team Sky	+ 1' 57"
8	Ángel Madrazo (ESP)	Movistar Team	+ 1' 57"
9	Richie Porte (AUS)	Team Sky	+ 1' 57"
10	Alberto Contador (ESP)	Saxo–Tinkoff	+ 1' 57"

=== Stage 4 ===
5 June 2013 — Villars-les-Dombes to Parc des Oiseaux, 32.5 km (20.2 mi), individual time trial (ITT)

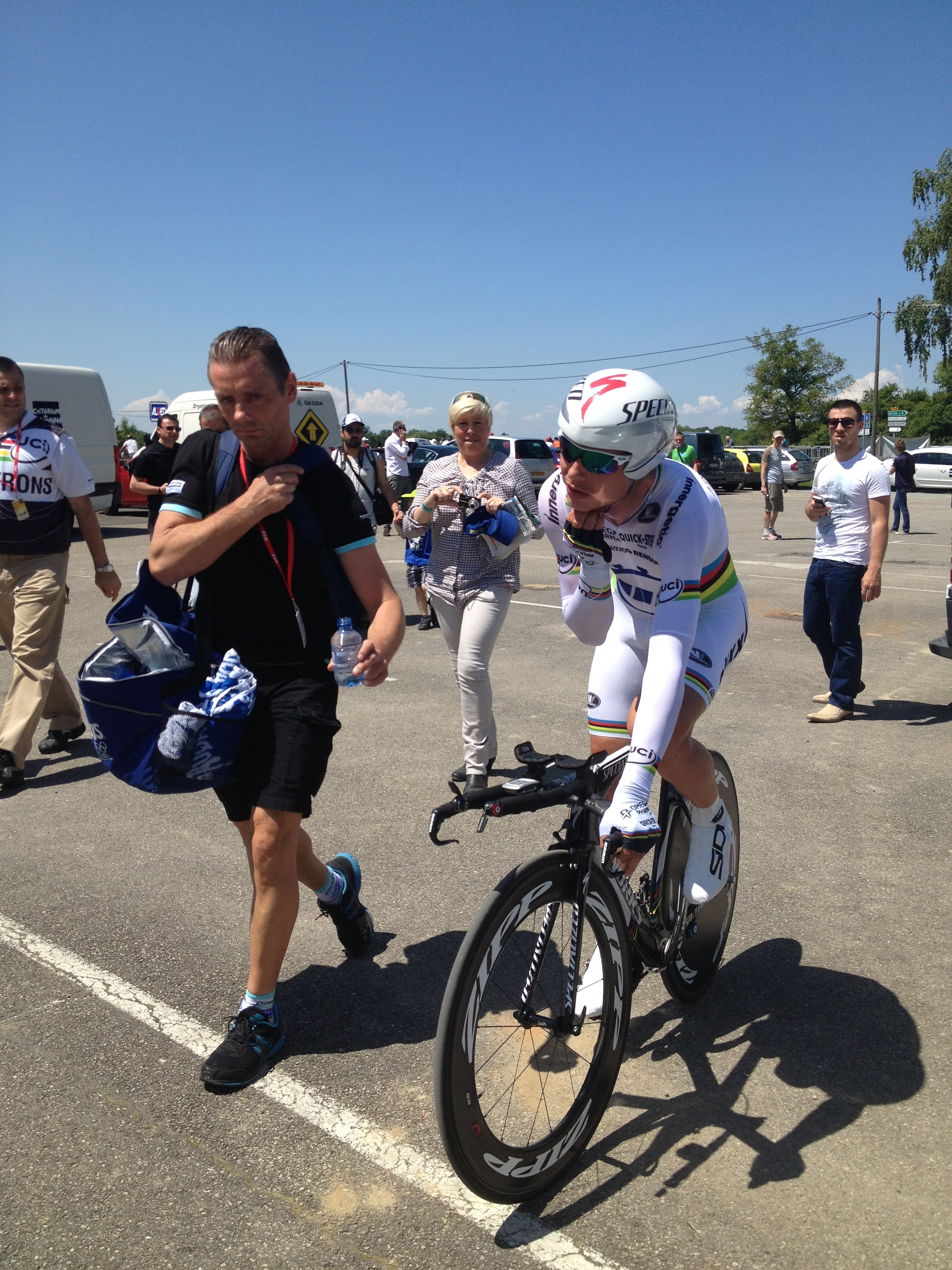
Tony Martin (Omega Pharma–Quick-Step) recorded his sixth individual time trial victory of the 2013 season, winning the stage by 47 seconds from his nearest challenger.

The race's only individual time trial of an extensive length was held as an out-and-back loop around Villars-les-Dombes in the Ain department. The parcours of the 32.5 km (20.2 mi)-long stage was almost entirely flat. The stage finished at the Parc des Oiseaux, one of the largest ornithological parks in Europe. Race organisers had expected the quickest times for the course to be around forty minutes. Several of the general classification leaders regarded the time trial as a test for an individual time trial of similar length due to be held in July, at the Tour de France. As is customary in time trial stages, cyclists set off in reverse order from where they were ranked in the general classification at the end of the previous stage. Thus, Larry Warbasse of the BMC Racing Team, who was in 172nd place of the 176 starters, trailing overall leader David Veilleux by thirty-five minutes and fourteen seconds, was the first rider to set off on the stage.

Warbasse recorded a time of 42' 43" for the course, but his stay at the top was almost immediately beaten by Orica–GreenEDGE's Mitchell Docker. Docker had started two minutes behind Warbasse – riders had started the stage at one-minute intervals – and nearly caught him towards the end, having already passed his team-mate Yannick Eijssen on the course. NetApp–Endura rider Alexander Wetterhall was the next rider to record the fastest time, setting a benchmark of 40' 19"; Jack Bauer was the first rider to break the expected fastest time, recording a sub-40 minute time for the parcours, as the Garmin–Sharp rider went top with 39' 33". Eloy Teruel went five seconds quicker than Bauer for the Movistar Team to assume top spot for a short time, before Czech national champion Jan Bárta, a team-mate of Wetterhall at NetApp–Endura, completed the course over a minute quicker in a time of 38' 30".

Teruel's team-mate Jonathan Castroviejo almost recorded the first time below 38 minutes, falling a couple of seconds shy with a time of 38' 02", but was still almost half a minute clear of the best time to that point, set by Bárta. His time was to be beaten by only three riders, the first of which was the eventual stage-winning time recorded by the world champion Tony Martin, riding for the Omega Pharma–Quick-Step team. Martin was comfortably quickest at each of the two intermediate time-checks along the route, and crossed the line over a minute clear of Castroviejo; he had recorded a time of 36' 54". Martin's winning time allowed him to claim his sixth individual time trial victory of 2013. Garmin–Sharp rider Rohan Dennis recorded the second-fastest time for the course at 37' 41", and by doing so, became the new leader of the Dauphiné by five seconds, from Team Sky's Chris Froome – the best of the general classification contenders, and one of four Team Sky riders in the top six – as Veilleux lost more than three minutes on the course.

Stage 4 Result

	Rider	Team	Time
1	Tony Martin (GER)	Omega Pharma–Quick-Step	36' 54"
2	Rohan Dennis (AUS)	Garmin–Sharp	+ 47"
3	Chris Froome (GBR)	Team Sky	+ 52"
4	Jonathan Castroviejo (ESP)	Movistar Team	+ 1' 08"
5	Michał Kwiatkowski (POL)	Omega Pharma–Quick-Step	+ 1' 13"
6	Edvald Boasson Hagen (NOR)	Team Sky	+ 1' 19"
7	Richie Porte (AUS)	Team Sky	+ 1' 20"
8	Jan Bárta (CZE)	NetApp–Endura	+ 1' 36"
9	Marco Pinotti (ITA)	BMC Racing Team	+ 1' 38"
10	Geraint Thomas (GBR)	Team Sky	+ 1' 42"

General Classification after Stage 4

	Rider	Team	Time
1	Rohan Dennis (AUS)	Garmin–Sharp	12h 40' 00"
2	Chris Froome (GBR)	Team Sky	+ 5"
3	Michał Kwiatkowski (POL)	Omega Pharma–Quick-Step	+ 26"
4	Edvald Boasson Hagen (NOR)	Team Sky	+ 32"
5	Richie Porte (AUS)	Team Sky	+ 33"
6	Geraint Thomas (GBR)	Team Sky	+ 55"
7	David Veilleux (CAN)	Team Europcar	+ 1' 09"
8	Leopold König (CZE)	NetApp–Endura	+ 1' 11"
9	Stef Clement (NED)	Blanco Pro Cycling	+ 1' 14"
10	Andriy Hryvko (UKR)	Astana	+ 1' 26"

=== Stage 5 ===
6 June 2013 — Grésy-sur-Aix to Valmorel, 139 km (86.4 mi)

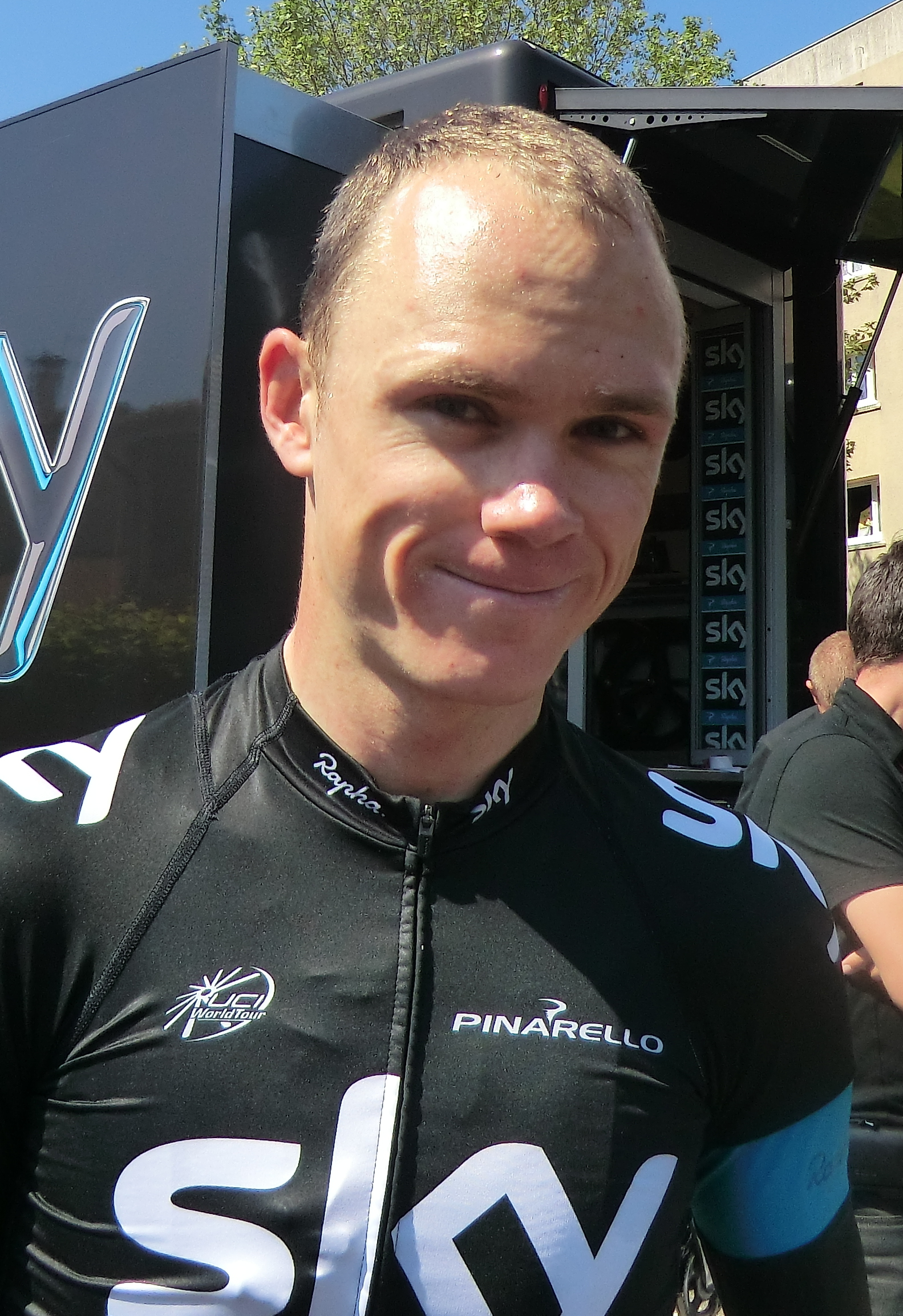
Chris Froome of Team Sky – pictured after the fourth stage – dropped his rivals on the final climb of the Montée de Valmorel, and won the stage to take the race lead from Garmin–Sharp's Rohan Dennis.

The fifth stage was the first to be categorised as a mountain stage, with a summit finish at the ski resort of Valmorel, just outside Les Avanchers. After an opening loop around the start town of Grésy-sur-Aix, the Côte de Trévignin was the first of four categorised climbs on the day's route. The climb of 4.4 km (2.7 mi) averaged 6.6% over the ascent, and from there the race progressed to the Massif des Bauges. After a period of undulating terrain, the short, sharp fourth-category Col du Frêne was next on the route, at 6% over just under 2 km (1.2 mi) of climbing. After the descent down to Saint-Pierre-d'Albigny, the 139 km (86.4 mi) parcours headed towards Valmorel via Albertville, the intermediate sprint point at La Bâthie and the fourth-category Côte de la Croix. The final climb, an hors catégorie ascent, averaged 7% over 12.7 km (7.9 mi), which was somewhat ameliorated by several hairpin bends towards the finish, which provided any attacking rider with a perfect kick towards the finish.

An attack-laden opening to the stage allowed a breakaway of fifteen riders to be formed after around 20 km (12.4 mi) of racing, with mountains classification leader Thomas Damuseau being among the group, to maintain his lead in those standings; the best-placed general classification rider among the group was Francesco Gavazzi (Astana), who trailed overnight leader Rohan Dennis of Garmin–Sharp by just under three-and-a-half minutes. The lead gap went over five minutes at one point during the stage, but was around half that as the leaders approached the final climb of the day. Tim Wellens (Lotto–Belisol) and Orica–GreenEDGE's Daniel Teklehaymanot set the pace at the foot of the climb, before Wellens attacked on his own. RadioShack–Leopard's Matthew Busche was able to bridge back up to Wellens, before dropping him.

Behind, Team Sky were leading the main group up the Montée de Valmorel, with the pace dislodging numerous riders. Alejandro Valverde (Movistar Team) attempted to chase down Busche, but was brought back with less than 3 km (1.9 mi) remaining. After losing time in the previous day's time trial, Alberto Contador of Saxo–Tinkoff attacked the group, but was chased down by Team Sky's Chris Froome; Froome and Contador were able to catch Busche in the closing stages, with Froome kicking on to take the stage victory and the race leader's yellow and blue jersey, as Dennis had been dropped in the final 2 km (1.2 mi) of the stage. Dennis ultimately fell to third in the general classification, as Froome's team-mate Richie Porte was also able to move ahead by two seconds, but he maintained his lead in the young rider classification.

Stage 5 Result

	Rider	Team	Time
1	Chris Froome (GBR)	Team Sky	3h 28' 39"
2	Alberto Contador (ESP)	Saxo–Tinkoff	+ 4"
3	Matthew Busche (USA)	RadioShack–Leopard	+ 4"
4	Alejandro Valverde (ESP)	Movistar Team	+ 10"
5	Michael Rogers (AUS)	Saxo–Tinkoff	+ 12"
6	Daniel Moreno (ESP)	Team Katusha	+ 12"
7	Rein Taaramäe (EST)	Cofidis	+ 12"
8	Daniel Navarro (ESP)	Cofidis	+ 21"
9	Richie Porte (AUS)	Team Sky	+ 24"
10	Jakob Fuglsang (DEN)	Astana	+ 29"

General Classification after Stage 5

	Rider	Team	Time
1	Chris Froome (GBR)	Team Sky	16h 08' 44"
2	Richie Porte (AUS)	Team Sky	+ 52"
3	Rohan Dennis (AUS)	Garmin–Sharp	+ 54"
4	Michael Rogers (AUS)	Saxo–Tinkoff	+ 1' 37"
5	Daniel Moreno (ESP)	Team Katusha	+ 1' 47"
6	Daniel Navarro (ESP)	Cofidis	+ 1' 49"
7	Rein Taaramäe (EST)	Cofidis	+ 1' 52"
8	Michał Kwiatkowski (POL)	Omega Pharma–Quick-Step	+ 1' 58"
9	Leopold König (CZE)	NetApp–Endura	+ 2' 16"
10	Jakob Fuglsang (DEN)	Astana	+ 2' 20"

=== Stage 6 ===
7 June 2013 — La Léchère to Grenoble, 143 km (88.9 mi)

The sixth stage was relatively short at 143 km (88.9 mi) long. After a near-flat opening 50 km (31.1 mi), which included the day's intermediate sprint at Albertville, the race moved towards the hills, with four categorised climbs within a 40 km (24.9 mi) period. The first was the shallowest of the quartet, with the fourth-category Côte d'Arvillard averaging 5.3% over 2.2 km (1.4 mi), before the first-category Col du Barioz − a narrow climb averaging 7.3% over 7.1 km (4.4 mi). After a speedy descent, the riders climbed once again, with the second-category Col des Ayes averaging over 8%. Another short, sharp climb of the Col des Mouilles finished the categorised climbing for the day.

After points classification leader Gianni Meersman extended his lead at the intermediate sprint for Omega Pharma–Quick-Step, the stage's breakaway took over an hour to form on the road. A three-rider move built up an advantage of over two minutes, after which Team Europcar took up station on the front of the peloton to get a rider clear. The rider in question was Thomas Voeckler, who managed to catch the original breakaway, and passed them on the road. Voeckler was later joined by seven other riders as they were ascending the Col du Barioz. The best placed rider of the octet was FDJ rider Alexandre Geniez, who trailed the overnight leader of the general classification, Chris Froome (Team Sky), by 3' 41"; despite this, Froome's squad kept the gap in check, with the difference not going over three minutes.

BMC Racing Team also helped with the chase of the leaders, and managed to halve the gap by the time the race reached the 30 km (18.6 mi) to go point. The lead group then splintered, as the Movistar Team's José Herrada attacked on his own. The Astana pairing of Egor Silin and Kevin Seeldraeyers were next to follow Herrada, with Voeckler and Geniez eventually rejoining, and Tim Wellens (Lotto–Belisol), Mikel Nieve of Euskaltel–Euskadi and Vacansoleil–DCM's Thomas De Gendt losing contact. Geniez later dropped back, which allowed for a slight lull in the chase, allowing the leaders to increase the gap from just over a minute to a minute-and-a-half. The gap remained at around a minute as the race entered Grenoble, which enabled the breakaway to battle it out for the honours. After several half-hearted moves, Voeckler was the only rider to launch a sizable move; he ultimately won the stage, ahead of Herrada, Seeldraeyers and Silin. Team Sky sprinter Edvald Boasson Hagen won the bunch sprint, 46 seconds later, as team-mate Froome kept the race lead.

Stage 6 Result

	Rider	Team	Time
1	Thomas Voeckler (FRA)	Team Europcar	3h 24' 13"
2	José Herrada (ESP)	Movistar Team	s.t.
3	Kevin Seeldraeyers (BEL)	Astana	s.t.
4	Egor Silin (RUS)	Astana	s.t.
5	Edvald Boasson Hagen (NOR)	Team Sky	+ 46"
6	Gianni Meersman (BEL)	Omega Pharma–Quick-Step	+ 46"
7	Francesco Gavazzi (ITA)	Astana	+ 46"
8	Wesley Sulzberger (AUS)	Orica–GreenEDGE	+ 46"
9	Arnaud Gérard (FRA)	Bretagne–Séché Environnement	+ 46"
10	Michał Kwiatkowski (POL)	Omega Pharma–Quick-Step	+ 46"

General Classification after Stage 6

	Rider	Team	Time
1	Chris Froome (GBR)	Team Sky	19h 33' 43"
2	Richie Porte (AUS)	Team Sky	+ 52"
3	Rohan Dennis (AUS)	Garmin–Sharp	+ 54"
4	Michael Rogers (AUS)	Saxo–Tinkoff	+ 1' 37"
5	Daniel Moreno (ESP)	Team Katusha	+ 1' 47"
6	Daniel Navarro (ESP)	Cofidis	+ 1' 49"
7	Rein Taaramäe (EST)	Cofidis	+ 1' 52"
8	Michał Kwiatkowski (POL)	Omega Pharma–Quick-Step	+ 1' 58"
9	Leopold König (CZE)	NetApp–Endura	+ 2' 16"
10	Jakob Fuglsang (DEN)	Astana	+ 2' 20"

=== Stage 7 ===
8 June 2013 — Le Pont-de-Claix to SuperDévoluy, 187.5 km (116.5 mi)

The queen stage of the 2013 Critérium du Dauphiné, the penultimate stage steadily rose out of the start town in Le Pont-de-Claix towards the first of the day's five categorised climbs. The first test, a climb to Alpe d'Huez, was seen as a dress rehearsal for the Tour de France, to be held in July, with the 12 km (7.5 mi), 8.6% average hors catégorie climb featuring twice on that race's eighteenth stage. From there, it was a short descent to the second climb, the second-category Col de Sarenne, which averaged almost 7% over 3 km (1.9 mi) of climbing. An immediate long descent followed, before the first-category Col d'Ornon, which averaged 6.1% over its 10.5 km (6.5 mi) duration. The riders enjoyed a respite from the climbs for around an hour across the Valbonnais, passing through the intermediate sprint at Corps. The final portion of the 187.5 km (116.5 mi) parcours saw the riders climb the Col du Noyer, with portions at 11%, before a descent and a 4 km (2.5 mi), 5.7% kick up to the finish at SuperDévoluy.

A group of twenty-two riders (from seventeen teams) formed the day's breakaway, and were around three minutes clear by the time they reached the foot of the climb to Alpe d'Huez. The gap rose to around four minutes by the summit of the climb – led over the top by Vacansoleil–DCM's Thomas De Gendt – which allowed Kevin Seeldraeyers (Astana) to become the virtual leader of the general classification. The breakaway began to splinter on the Col d'Ornon, as the advantage over the main field continued to rise, to over five minutes. Alexey Lutsenko led over the climb for Astana, ahead of the mountains classification leader Thomas Damuseau of Argos–Shimano and Seeldraeyers. Omega Pharma–Quick-Step's Sylvain Chavanel and Cannondale rider Alessandro De Marchi moved clear ahead of the Col du Noyer, and managed to pull around a minute-and-a-half clear of the rest of the breakaway by the foot of the climb.

De Marchi dropped Chavanel on the climb, but by this time, the lead group had moved within a minute of catching him; they eventually did so with around 14 km (8.7 mi) left to cover on the stage. Saxo–Tinkoff and Team Sky were prominent at the front of the leading group, setting the pace high enough to reduce the group to around a dozen riders. Euskaltel–Euskadi rider Samuel Sánchez attacked near the top of the climb, with another Astana rider, Jakob Fuglsang. The two riders worked well together and managed to build a gap of about twenty seconds prior to the final climb, remaining clear until the finish. Sánchez out-sprinted Fuglsang at the end for his first win of the year; a win he later dedicated to his former team-mate Víctor Cabedo, who had died in a training accident in September 2012. Richie Porte finished third for Team Sky, having been aided by his team-mate and overall leader, Chris Froome.

Stage 7 Result

	Rider	Team	Time
1	Samuel Sánchez (ESP)	Euskaltel–Euskadi	5h 26' 14"
2	Jakob Fuglsang (DEN)	Astana	s.t.
3	Richie Porte (AUS)	Team Sky	+ 15"
4	Daniel Moreno (ESP)	Team Katusha	+ 16"
5	Stef Clement (NED)	Blanco Pro Cycling	+ 16"
6	Alejandro Valverde (ESP)	Movistar Team	+ 16"
7	Chris Froome (GBR)	Team Sky	+ 16"
8	Daniel Navarro (ESP)	Cofidis	+ 16"
9	Michael Rogers (AUS)	Saxo–Tinkoff	+ 16"
10	Alberto Contador (ESP)	Saxo–Tinkoff	+ 23"

General Classification after Stage 7

	Rider	Team	Time
1	Chris Froome (GBR)	Team Sky	25h 00' 13"
2	Richie Porte (AUS)	Team Sky	+ 51"
3	Michael Rogers (AUS)	Saxo–Tinkoff	+ 1' 37"
4	Daniel Moreno (ESP)	Team Katusha	+ 1' 47"
5	Daniel Navarro (ESP)	Cofidis	+ 1' 49"
6	Jakob Fuglsang (DEN)	Astana	+ 2' 04"
7	Stef Clement (NED)	Blanco Pro Cycling	+ 2' 32"
8	Alejandro Valverde (ESP)	Movistar Team	+ 2' 47"
9	Rohan Dennis (AUS)	Garmin–Sharp	+ 2' 48"
10	Alberto Contador (ESP)	Saxo–Tinkoff	+ 2' 56"

=== Stage 8 ===
9 June 2013 — Sisteron to Risoul, 155.5 km (96.6 mi)

The final stage of the 2013 Critérium du Dauphiné was a categorised medium-mountain stage 155.5 km (96.6 mi) in length. Having rolled out of the start town of Sisteron, the parcours headed towards Gigors via some rolling terrain, and after a descent, set up for the first of three categorised climbs: the Côte de la Bréole, averaging around 5% for its 5.4 km (3.4 mi) length. Having passed through the feed zone at Le Lauzet-Ubaye, the road steadily rose towards the foot of the second climb, the first-category Col de Vars. A climb of irregular gradient, it averaged 6.9% for 10.4 km (6.5 mi) of climbing, albeit with a short downhill section in the middle. From the summit, the route descended towards Guillestre and ultimately, the start of the final climb to Risoul, a steady almost-14 km (8.7 mi) climb, maxing at around 9%, but averaging 6.7% for its duration. The climb had previously featured in the 2010 edition of the race, where Nicolas Vogondy soloed to victory.

For the second day running, a large breakaway group formed for the primary break of the day. A total of 24 riders, including members of 17 of the race's 22 teams, were part of the group at its largest. The group included mountains classification leader Thomas Damuseau (Argos–Shimano), who set about securing an unassailable advantage in the standings. He led over the top of the Côte de la Bréole, as the peloton allowed them an advantage of around three-and-a-half minutes. Points classification leader Gianni Meersman of Omega Pharma–Quick-Step was also among the group, and he took maximum points at the intermediate sprint at Jausiers to extend his advantage, but not enough to mathematically secure the jersey. On the Col de Vars, Lotto–Belisol rider Tim Wellens and Cannondale's Alessandro De Marchi attacked, and were later joined by Travis Meyer of Orica–GreenEDGE; Meyer was able to distance his companions for a period, before De Marchi, Wellens, BMC Racing Team rider Manuel Quinziato and Team Katusha's Alberto Losada were able to rejoin him.

This quintet held an advantage of approaching three minutes, as they headed towards the final climb in the treacherous conditions that had been prominent throughout the stage. Wellens attacked at the foot of the climb, and managed to acquire a gap over around 30 seconds halfway up, but had been tiring quickly. This fatigue allowed De Marchi to rejoin him, and ultimately pass him on the road. Team Sky, leading the peloton in protection of the overall leader Chris Froome, were setting a fast pace in the group, and the pace forced Michael Rogers (Saxo–Tinkoff) to be distanced, putting his third place overall under threat. Froome and team-mate Richie Porte soon gained ground off the front of the peloton, further securing the duo's one-two finish in the overall standings. They set off in chase of De Marchi, but he ultimately prevailed for his first professional victory, finishing 24 seconds clear of the nearest rider. Froome finished second, ahead of Garmin–Sharp's Andrew Talansky, who caught Froome and passed Porte in the closing metres; Froome thus secured the overall lead, missed out on the points title by two points to Meersman Rogers faded to sixth overall, which handed Daniel Moreno (Team Katusha) the final place on the podium.

Stage 8 Result

	Rider	Team	Time
1	Alessandro De Marchi (ITA)	Cannondale	4h 28' 09"
2	Chris Froome (GBR)	Team Sky	+ 24"
3	Andrew Talansky (USA)	Garmin–Sharp	+ 24"
4	Richie Porte (AUS)	Team Sky	+ 31"
5	Jakob Fuglsang (DEN)	Astana	+ 38"
6	Alejandro Valverde (ESP)	Movistar Team	+ 49"
7	Joaquim Rodríguez (ESP)	Team Katusha	+ 49"
8	Daniel Moreno (ESP)	Team Katusha	+ 49"
9	Daniel Navarro (ESP)	Cofidis	+ 55"
10	Rohan Dennis (AUS)	Garmin–Sharp	+ 1' 00"

Final General Classification

	Rider	Team	Time
1	Chris Froome (GBR)	Team Sky	29h 28' 46"
2	Richie Porte (AUS)	Team Sky	+ 58"
3	Daniel Moreno (ESP)	Team Katusha	+ 2' 12"
4	Jakob Fuglsang (DEN)	Astana	+ 2' 18"
5	Daniel Navarro (ESP)	Cofidis	+ 2' 20"
6	Michael Rogers (AUS)	Saxo–Tinkoff	+ 3' 08"
7	Alejandro Valverde (ESP)	Movistar Team	+ 3' 12"
8	Rohan Dennis (AUS)	Garmin–Sharp	+ 3' 24"
9	Samuel Sánchez (ESP)	Euskaltel–Euskadi	+ 4' 25"
10	Alberto Contador (ESP)	Saxo–Tinkoff	+ 4' 27"

== Classification leadership ==
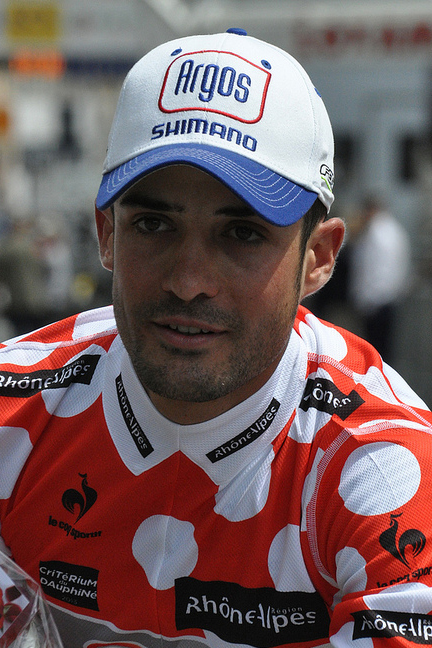
Argos–Shimano's Thomas Damuseau, the winner of the mountains classification.

In the 2013 Critérium du Dauphiné, four different jerseys were awarded. For the general classification, calculated by adding each cyclist's finishing times on each stage, the leader received a yellow jersey with a blue bar. This classification was considered the most important of the 2013 Critérium du Dauphiné, and the winner of the classification was considered the winner of the race.

Additionally, there was a points classification, which awarded a green jersey. In the points classification, cyclists got points for finishing in the top 10 in a stage. For all stages, the win earned 15 points, second place earned 12 points, third 10, fourth 8, fifth 6, and one point fewer per place down to a single point for 10th. Points towards the classification could also be achieved at each of the intermediate sprints; these points were given to the top three riders through the line with 5 points for first, 3 for second, and 1 point for third.

There was also a mountains classification, the leadership of which was marked by a red and white polka-dot jersey. In the mountains classification, points were won by reaching the top of a climb before other cyclists. Each climb was categorised as either hors, first, second, third, or fourth-category, with more points available for the higher-categorised climbs. Hors catégorie climbs awarded the most points, with 20 points on offer for the first rider across the summit; the first ten riders were able to accrue points towards the mountains classification, compared with the first eight on first-category passes and the first six riders on second-category climbs. Fewer points were on offer for the smaller hills, marked as third-category or fourth-category.

The fourth jersey represented the young rider classification, marked by a white jersey. This was decided the same way as the general classification, but only riders born after 1 January 1988 were eligible to be ranked in the classification. There was also a classification for teams, in which the times of the best three cyclists per team on each stage were added together; the leading team at the end of the race was the team with the lowest total time.

Stage	Winner	General classification	Mountains classification	Points classification	Young rider classification	Team Classification
1	David Veilleux	David Veilleux	David Veilleux	David Veilleux	Tom-Jelte Slagter	Team Europcar
2	Elia Viviani	David Veilleux	Thomas Damuseau	Gianni Meersman	Tony Gallopin	Team Europcar
3	Edvald Boasson Hagen	David Veilleux	Thomas Damuseau	Gianni Meersman	Tony Gallopin	Team Europcar
4	Tony Martin	Rohan Dennis	Thomas Damuseau	Gianni Meersman	Rohan Dennis	Team Sky
5	Chris Froome	Chris Froome	Thomas Damuseau	Gianni Meersman	Rohan Dennis	Team Sky
6	Thomas Voeckler	Chris Froome	Thomas Damuseau	Gianni Meersman	Rohan Dennis	Team Sky
7	Samuel Sánchez	Chris Froome	Thomas Damuseau	Gianni Meersman	Rohan Dennis	Team Sky
8	Alessandro De Marchi	Chris Froome	Thomas Damuseau	Gianni Meersman	Rohan Dennis	Team Sky
Final		Chris Froome	Thomas Damuseau	Gianni Meersman	Rohan Dennis	Team Sky
