= Finkenberg =

- Municipality
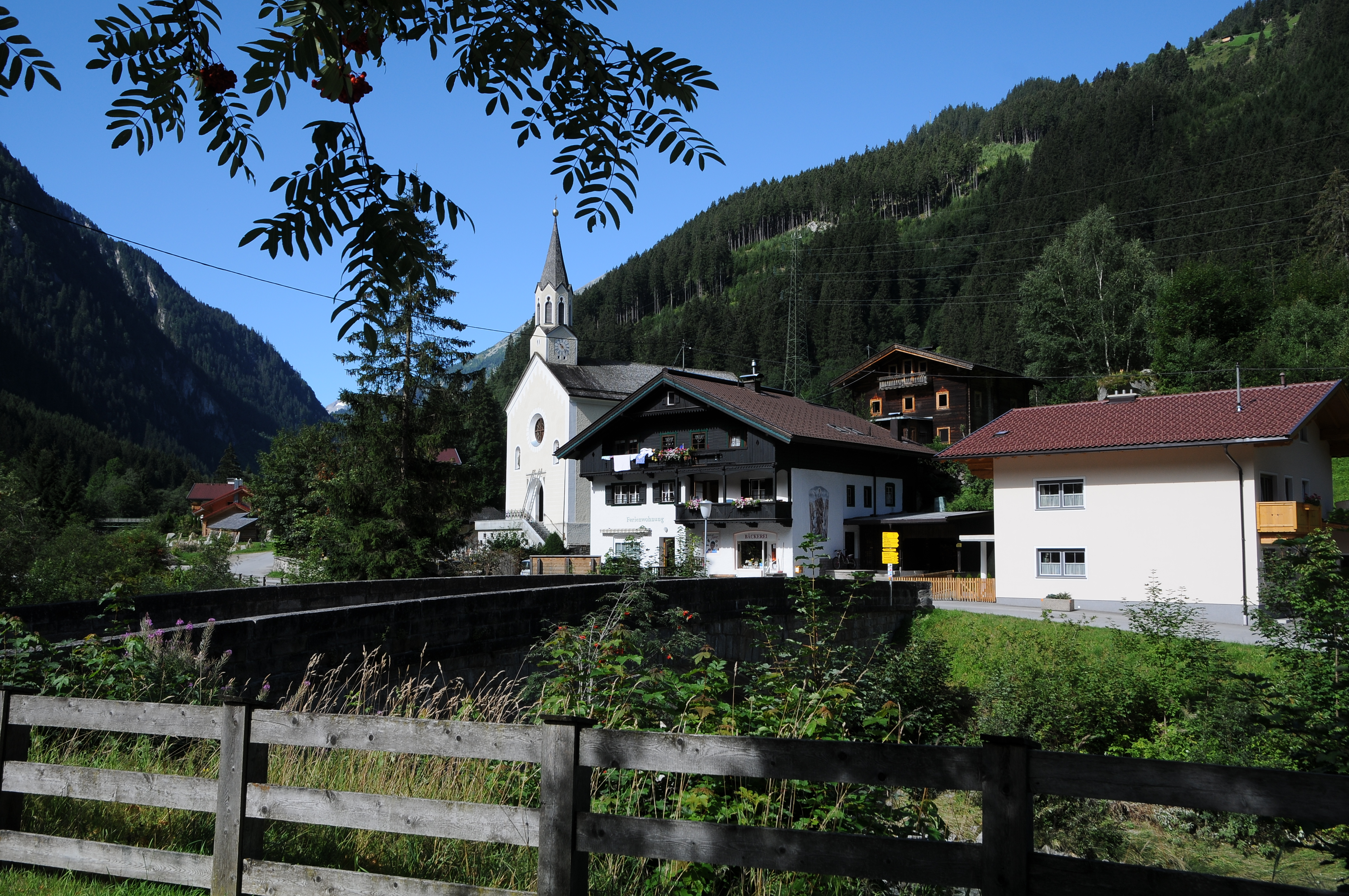

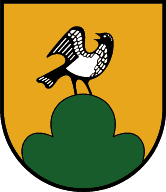
- Coat of arms

- Location within Austria
- Coordinates: 47°09′10″N 11°49′18″E
- Country: Austria
- State: Tyrol
- District: Schwaz

Government
  - Mayor: Mathias Eberl

Area
  - Total: 171.54 km^{2} (66.23 sq mi)
- Elevation: 839 m (2,753 ft)

Population (2021)
  - Total: 1,413
  - Density: 8.237/km^{2} (21.33/sq mi)
- Time zone: UTC+1 (CET)
  - Summer (DST): UTC+2 (CEST)
- Postal code: 6292
- Area code: 05285
- Vehicle registration: SZ
- Website: www.finkenberg. tirol.gv.at

Finkenberg is a municipality in the Schwaz district in the Austrian state of Tyrol.

== Geography ==
Finkenberg lies about 3 km southwest of Mayrhofen at the entrance to the Tuxer valley.

== Sightseeing ==
- Garnet Chapel near the Penken.
