= Thomas Damuseau =

French cyclist

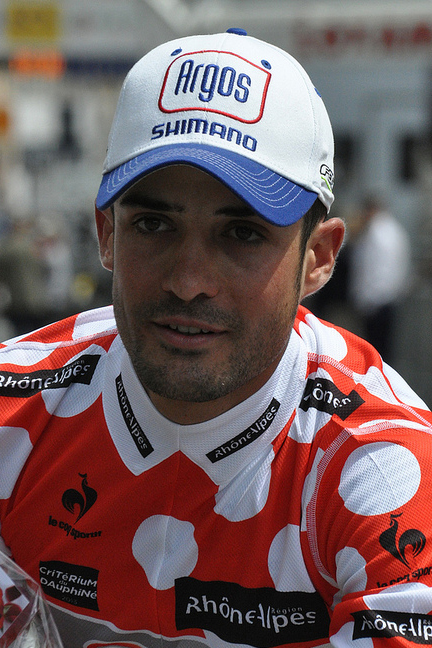
- Damuseau at the 2013 Critérium du Dauphiné.

Personal information
- Full name: Thomas Damuseau
- Born: 18 March 1989 (age 37) Grenoble, Rhône-Alpes, France
- Height: 1.73 m (5 ft 8 in)
- Weight: 64 kg (141 lb)

Cycling career
- Sport: Cycling
- Current team: Retired
- Discipline: Road
- Role: Rider
- Rider type: All-rounder

Amateur teams
- 2008–2010: Chambéry Cyclisme Formation
- 2010: Skil–Shimano (stagiaire)

Professional teams
- 2011–2014: Skil–Shimano
- 2015: Roubaix–Lille Métropole

Thomas Damuseau (born 18 March 1989) is a French former professional road racing cyclist, who rode professionally between 2011 and 2015 for the Giant–Shimano and Roubaix–Lille Métropole teams.

== Major results ==
2009
4th Overall Ronde de l'Isard
2010
2nd Road race, National Road Championships
4th Liège–Bastogne–Liège U23
7th Overall Giro delle Regioni
2013
1st Mountains classification Critérium du Dauphiné
3rd Grand Prix d'Ouverture La Marseillaise
10th Paris–Bourges
2015
5th Paris–Troyes
7th Overall Boucles de la Mayenne
