= David Veilleux =

Canadian former professional cyclist (born 1987)

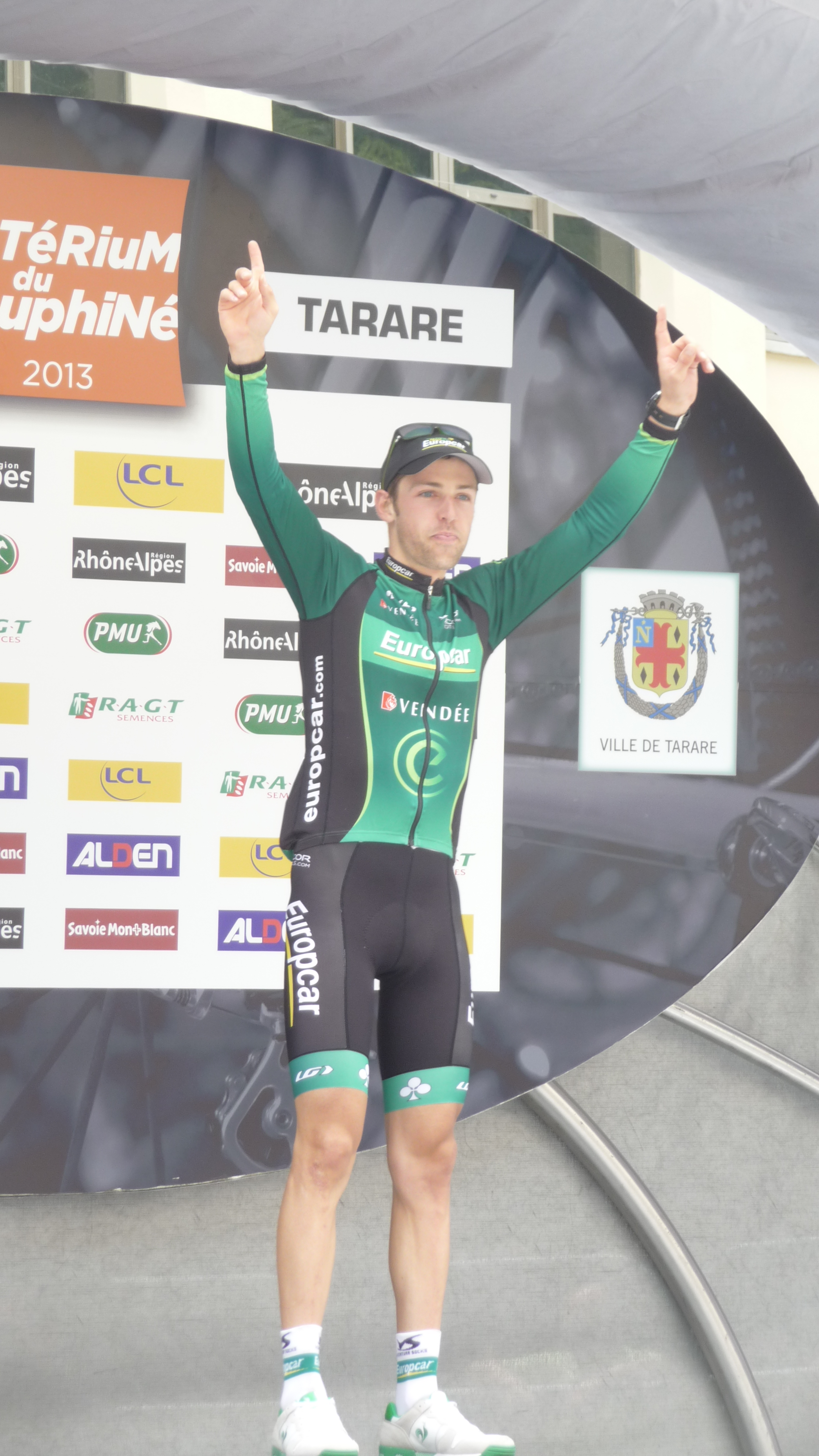

Personal information
- Full name: David Veilleux
- Born: 26 November 1987 (age 38) Cap-Rouge, Quebec, Canada
- Height: 1.80 m (5 ft 11 in)
- Weight: 70 kg (154 lb)

Cycling career
- Sport: Cycling
- Current team: Retired
- Discipline: Road
- Role: Rider
- Rider type: All arounder, Time-trialist

Professional teams
- 2007: Jittery Joe's
- 2008–2010: Kelly Benefit Strategies–Medifast
- 2011–2013: Team Europcar

Major wins
- Tre Valli Varesine (2012)

David Veilleux (born 26 November 1987) is a Canadian former professional cyclist, who competed as a professional between 2011 and 2013. He is best known for his victories in the Italian semi-classic Tre Valli Varesine in 2012 and winning a stage of the 2013 Critérium du Dauphiné.

== Professional career ==
In 2011, he took his first win under the Europcar banner, the 1.2 classified La Roue Tourangelle. He broke away in the final 30 kilometers with Anthony Delaplace from the Saur–Sojasun squad. The pair cooperated well together to resist to the peloton's charge and Veilleux beat Delaplace to the sprint, while the bunch reached the finish line only 5 seconds after them.

In the spring of 2012, Veilleux was part of a long breakaway in the monument Paris-Roubaix which was composed of about a dozen units. They broke away at kilometer 70 and were joined (scattered) well after the Forest of Arenberg, some 110 kilometres (68 mi) later. Leading to the Tour de France, it was announced that Veilleux was under consideration to participate in the race, but in the end he was not chosen, which drew considerable press coverage in his country.

In August 2012, Veilleux met success on the Mi-Août Bretonne, which is classified as a 2.2 race by the UCI. He won the opening stage after leaving his eight breakaway companions and riding the last 15 kilometres (9.3 mi) on his own. He and his team successfully defended his leader's jersey for the remaining three stages and he pocketed the general classification victory by 57 seconds on his nearest competitor. In the same month, Veilleux took a great step forward in his career as he won the Tre Valli Varesine, an Italian semi-classic. Veilleux was part of a ten men escape group, and dropped them with 17 kilometres (11 mi) to go, winning solo.

In 2013, Veilleux won the first stage of the Critérium du Dauphiné after being the sole survivor of an early breakaway on the undulating stage. He held on to the leader's jersey until the fourth stage time trial. Shortly after the Dauphiné, Veilleux was confirmed by Team Europcar as a participant for the Tour de France, therefore becoming the first Québec-born rider in history to participate in the event. In the meantime, Veilleux won the overall classification of the 2.2 race Boucles de la Mayenne. On 11 September 2013, he announced his retirement from professional cycling, saying he wanted to continue his studies in mechanical engineering at Laval University and to start a family.

== Major results ==
2005
1st Overall Tour de l'Abitibi
2006
1st Under-23 National Road Race Championships
1st Under-23 National Time Trial Championships
2007
1st Under-23 National Time Trial Championships
2008
1st Under-23 National Road Race Championships
1st Under-23 National Time Trial Championships
1st Overall Tour of Pennsylvania

1st Stages 4 & 5

1st Overall Tour of Elk Grove
1st Stage 5 Nature Valley Grand Prix
2009
1st Under-23 National Time Trial Championships
1st Points Classification Tour of Utah
6th Duo Normand (with Ryan Anderson)
10th Under-23 World Time Trial Championships
2010
1st National Criterium Championships
1st Overall Fitchburg Longsjo Classic
2nd Overall Tour of Elk Grove
3rd Nature Valley Grand Prix
2011
1st La Roue Tourangelle
2012
1st Overall Mi-Août Bretonne

1st Stage 1

1st Tre Valli Varesine
1st Prologue Tour d'Alsace (TTT)
2013
1st Overall Boucles de la Mayenne
1st Stage 1 Critérium du Dauphiné
