= Mayrhofen =

- Municipality
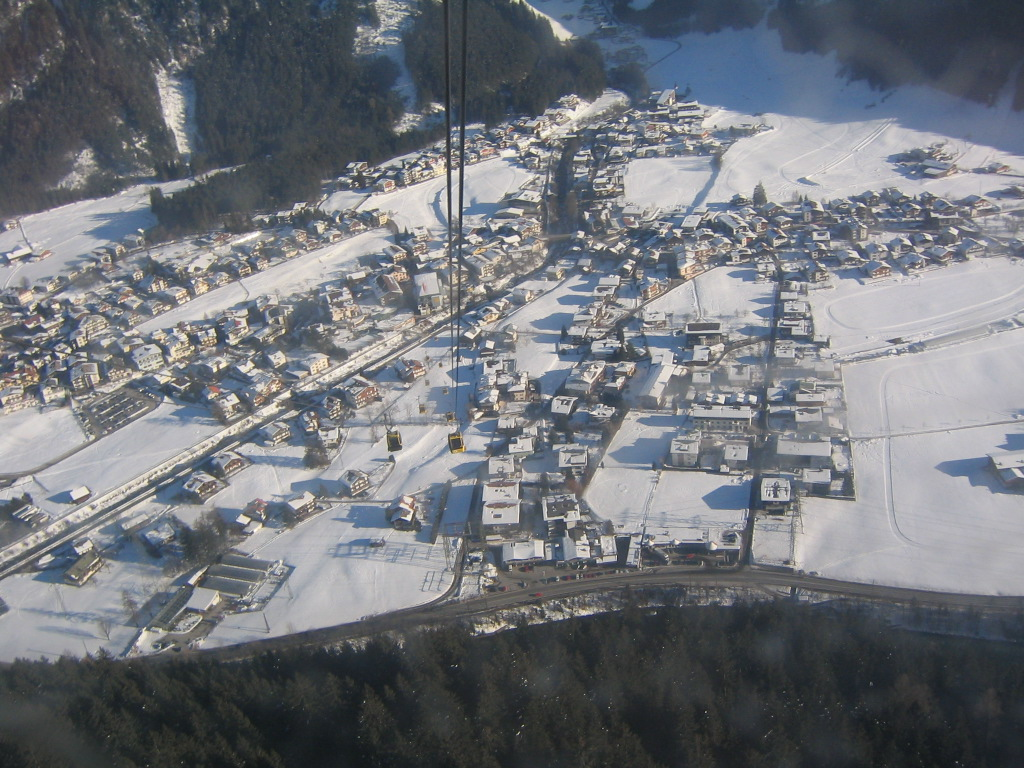

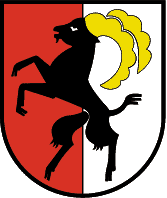
- Coat of arms

- Location within Austria
- Coordinates: 47°10′N 11°52′E
- Country: Austria
- State: Tyrol
- District: Schwaz

Government
  - Mayor: Monika Wechselberger

Area
  - Total: 178.79 km^{2} (69.03 sq mi)
- Elevation: 633 m (2,077 ft)

Population (2021)
  - Total: 3,907
  - Density: 21.85/km^{2} (56.60/sq mi)
- Time zone: UTC+1 (CET)
  - Summer (DST): UTC+2 (CEST)
- Postal code: 6290
- Area code: 05285
- Vehicle registration: SZ
- Website: www.mayrhofen.at

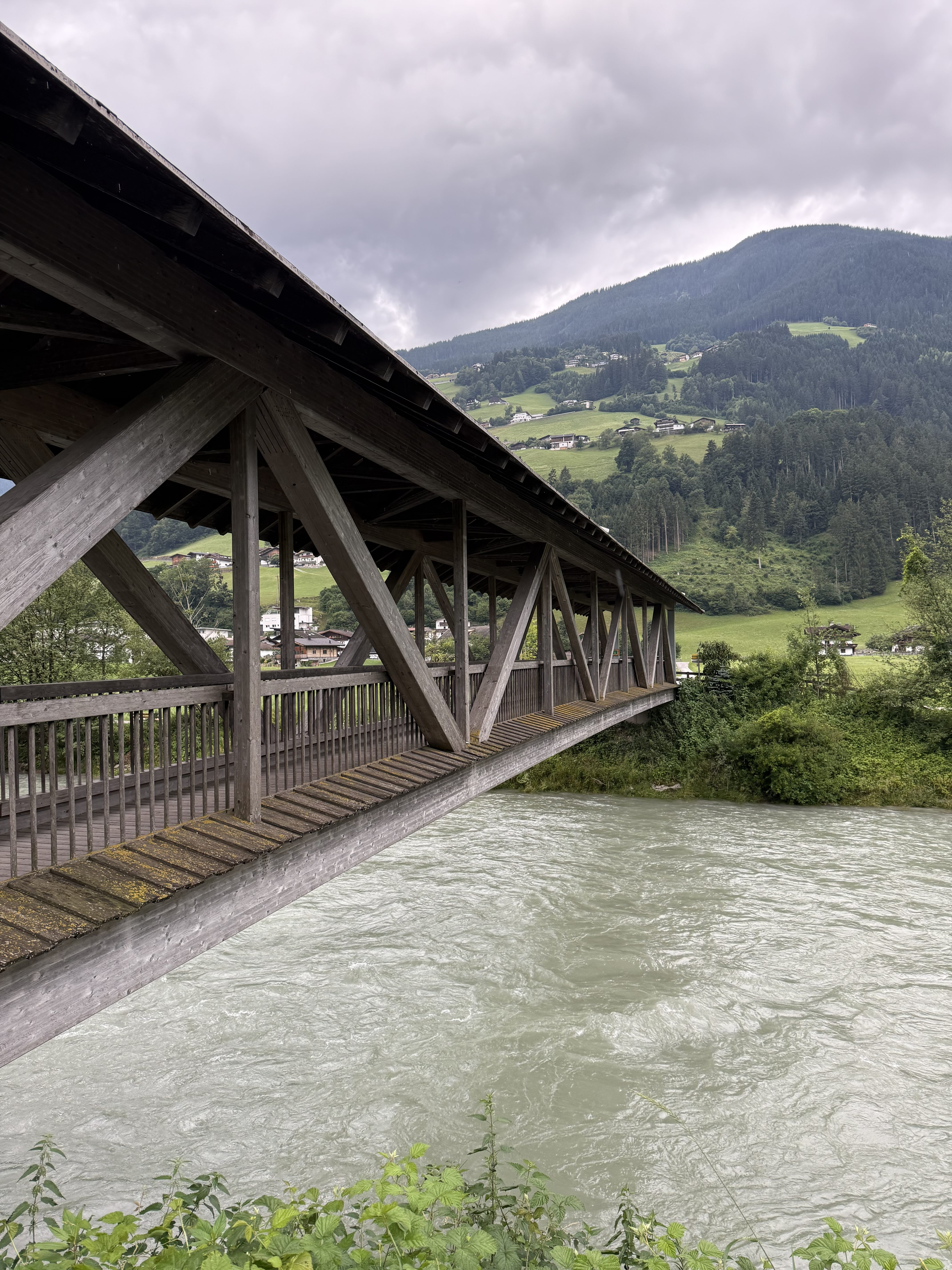
Zillerbrücke

Mayrhofen is a town in the Zillertal (Ziller river valley) in the Austrian state of Tyrol. It is located approximately an hour from the Tyrolean capital city of Innsbruck.

== Population ==
Historical population
Year	Pop.	±%
1869	1,172	—
1880	1,114	−4.9%
1890	1,094	−1.8%
1900	1,096	+0.2%
1910	1,218	+11.1%
1923	1,514	+24.3%
1934	1,928	+27.3%
1939	2,076	+7.7%
1951	2,351	+13.2%
1961	2,523	+7.3%
1971	3,175	+25.8%
1981	3,270	+3.0%
1991	3,679	+12.5%
2001	3,751	+2.0%
2011	3,833	+2.2%
2021	3,916	+2.2%

== Tourism ==
The town offers a variety of summer and winter sports including skiing, hiking, mountain biking and paragliding. Mayrhofen is situated near the Hintertux glacier, which, at 3,250 metres (10,660 feet) above sea level, is above the snowline. Skiing is available all year round here. Mayrhofen sits between the Penken and the Ahorn mountains which provide ski runs in the winter and mountain biking, hiking and paragliding in the summer. The Ahorn offers mainly easy and intermediate runs, but also has a long, steep black run (formerly red) which was once on the World Cup Downhill circuit but was removed as it was deemed too dangerous. The Penken mountain offers Austria's steepest piste, named Harakiri, as well as a large range of ski runs at different levels of difficulty. It is connected by lifts with the villages of Finkenberg, Lanersbach and Schwendau.

Tricable detachable gondola lift Penkenbahn and its stations

The Penken is reached by a Gondola system, the Penkenbahn, which is located on the main street next to the Sport Hotel Strass, in the centre of the village, while the Ahorn Cable car or Ahornbahn, which with a capacity of 160 passengers is the largest cable car in Austria, is situated at the southern end of the town. Mayrhofen is a snowboard-minded village with a funpark sponsored by Vans, and the snowboardhotel Gasthof Zillertal owned by the Dutch organisation 'SAIKO expeditions'. Mountaineer Peter Habeler and Downhill Racer Uli Spiess both come from Mayrhofen.

The town also provides an excellent base for walkers, as Mayrhofen is home to many trails touring the mountains and nearby Ziller valley.

== Events ==
Since 2005, each spring (usually early April), Mayrhofen hosts the Snowbombing music festival. Since the initial event in 2000 (held in Risoul, France), snowbombing has gathered much notoriety and respect in the electronic dance music world as one of the major festivals. The event has been hosted by Mayrhofen since 2005.

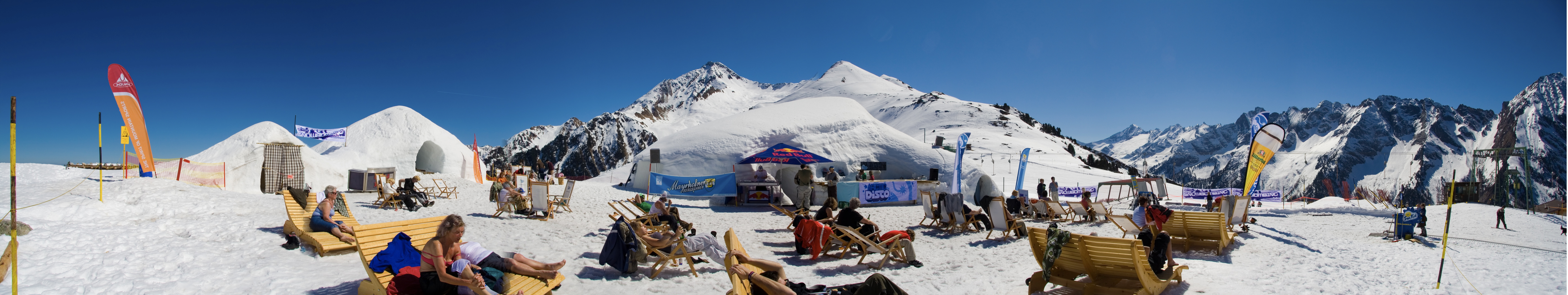
Snowbombing piste-side music venue

== Climate ==
Mayrhofen

Climate chart (precipitation, max. and min. temperature)
J	F	M	A	M	J	J	A	S	O	N	D
55 1 −4	46 4 −3	63 10 0	74 14 3	97 20 8	131 22 11	149 24 13	131 23 12	97 19 9	65 14 5	75 6 0	62 1 −3
- █ Average max. and min. temperatures in °C
- █ Precipitation totals in mm
- Source: ZAMG
Imperial conversion
J	F	M	A	M	J	J	A	S	O	N	D
2.2 34 25	1.8 39 27	2.5 50 32	2.9 57 37	3.8 68 46	5.2 72 52	5.9 75 55	5.2 73 54	3.8 66 48	2.6 57 41	3 43 32	2.4 34 27
- █ Average max. and min. temperatures in °F
- █ Precipitation totals in inches

Climate data for Mayrhofen (1971–2000)
Month	Jan	Feb	Mar	Apr	May	Jun	Jul	Aug	Sep	Oct	Nov	Dec	Year
Record high °C (°F)	16.0 (60.8)	17.0 (62.6)	24.0 (75.2)	27.0 (80.6)	31.0 (87.8)	32.6 (90.7)	36.0 (96.8)	35.0 (95.0)	31.2 (88.2)	26.0 (78.8)	21.6 (70.9)	19.0 (66.2)	36.0 (96.8)
Mean daily maximum °C (°F)	1.1 (34.0)	4.3 (39.7)	9.6 (49.3)	14.1 (57.4)	19.7 (67.5)	21.7 (71.1)	23.8 (74.8)	23.2 (73.8)	19.3 (66.7)	13.9 (57.0)	6.0 (42.8)	1.4 (34.5)	13.2 (55.8)
Daily mean °C (°F)	−2.1 (28.2)	−0.4 (31.3)	3.6 (38.5)	7.6 (45.7)	12.7 (54.9)	15.2 (59.4)	17.1 (62.8)	16.5 (61.7)	12.9 (55.2)	8.3 (46.9)	2.3 (36.1)	−1.3 (29.7)	7.7 (45.9)
Mean daily minimum °C (°F)	−4.4 (24.1)	−3.4 (25.9)	0.0 (32.0)	3.3 (37.9)	7.8 (46.0)	10.6 (51.1)	12.5 (54.5)	12.3 (54.1)	9.2 (48.6)	4.9 (40.8)	−0.1 (31.8)	−3.4 (25.9)	4.1 (39.4)
Record low °C (°F)	−22.0 (−7.6)	−16.4 (2.5)	−16.2 (2.8)	−5.0 (23.0)	−4.0 (24.8)	1.8 (35.2)	1.0 (33.8)	4.0 (39.2)	0.0 (32.0)	−5.7 (21.7)	−13.2 (8.2)	−18.0 (−0.4)	−22.0 (−7.6)
Average precipitation mm (inches)	54.7 (2.15)	46.4 (1.83)	63.2 (2.49)	74.0 (2.91)	96.9 (3.81)	130.9 (5.15)	148.9 (5.86)	130.7 (5.15)	97.0 (3.82)	64.7 (2.55)	74.6 (2.94)	61.7 (2.43)	1,043.7 (41.09)
Average snowfall cm (inches)	28.0 (11.0)	25.3 (10.0)	16.4 (6.5)	4.5 (1.8)	0.4 (0.2)	0.0 (0.0)	0.0 (0.0)	0.0 (0.0)	0.0 (0.0)	0.8 (0.3)	10.2 (4.0)	20.8 (8.2)	106.4 (41.9)
Average precipitation days (≥ 1.0 mm)	8.4	7.9	9.9	10.6	11.4	15.0	15.4	14.2	10.7	8.3	9.7	9.2	130.7
Average relative humidity (%) (at 14:00)	79.7	65.6	55.5	50.7	47.9	53.4	54.6	56.3	58.6	63.6	76.5	85.9	62.4
Mean monthly sunshine hours	2.4	69.0	130.3	124.1	183.5	164.4	183.6	176.9	138.4	87.4	19.5	11.2	1,290.7
Source: Central Institute for Meteorology and Geodynamics

== Transport ==
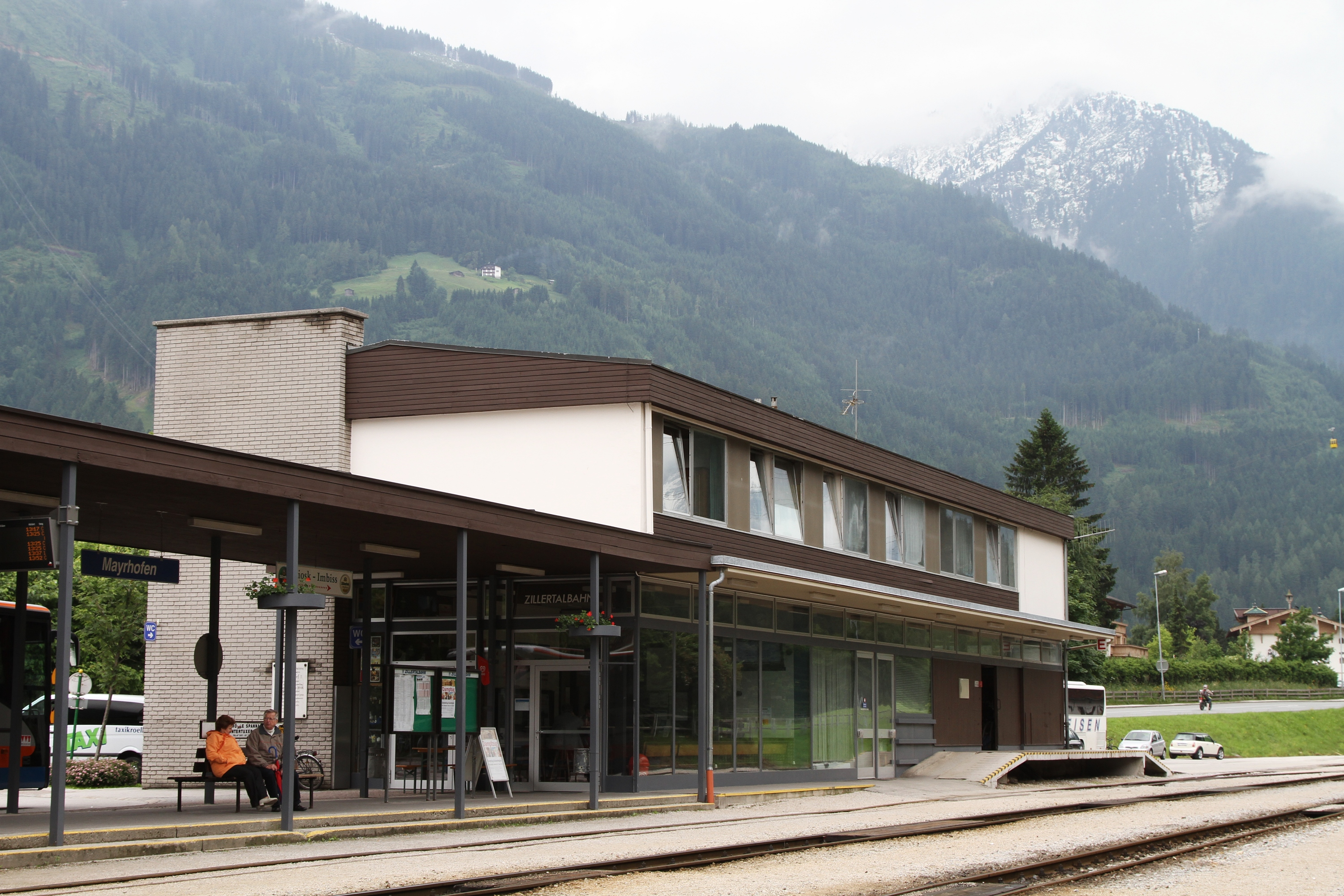
The railway station at Mayrhofen im Zillertal.

Mayrhofen has one railway station, which is located next to the Zillertaler Bundestrasse. The station is a terminus for all Train services operated by the Zillertalbahn, the valley's main public transport operator. The railway runs between Jenbach and Mayrhofen itself, and there are several intermediate stations, which provide access to many of the valley's well known ski areas, namely Zell am Ziller (Zillertal 3000), Fügen (Spieljoch) and Uderns (for the Hochfügen and Kaltenbach ski areas). The railway operates year-round, although in summer additional 'special' services operate, such as a steam train service.

The Zillertalbahn also run bus routes in the valley, which are regular and cover an extensive area. Additional services also operate during the winter, to cater for the skiing season.

== Statistics ==
- Elevation: Top: 2,500 metres (8,200 feet) (with ski-lift)
- Lifts: 48
- Terrain: 157 kilometres (98 miles) of groomed slopes in the region

== Twin towns ==
- Chur, Switzerland
- Bad Tölz, Germany
- Bad Homburg, Germany
- Terracina, Italy
- Cabourg, France
- Mondorf-les-Bains, Luxembourg
- Beilngries, Germany
- Hinterzarten, Germany
