= Snowbombing =

Annual ski resort festival held in Mayrhofen, Austria

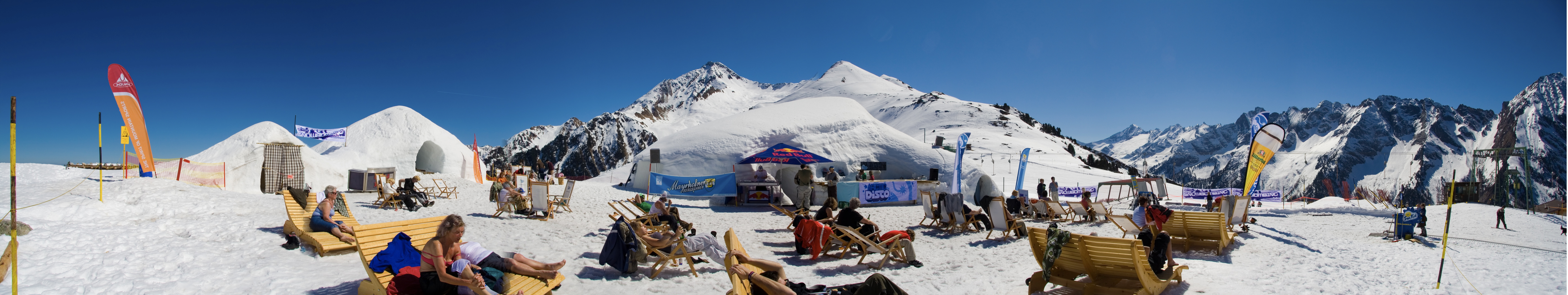
- Snowbombing Arctic Disco, Mayrhofen
- Genre: Electronic Dance Music
- Dates: 8 - 13 April 2024
- Location: Austrian ski resort of Mayrhofen
- Years active: 2000-present
- Capacity: 7000
- Website: Snowbombing Official Website

Snowbombing is a ski resort festival, held annually in the spring at the Austrian ski resort of Mayrhofen.

== History ==
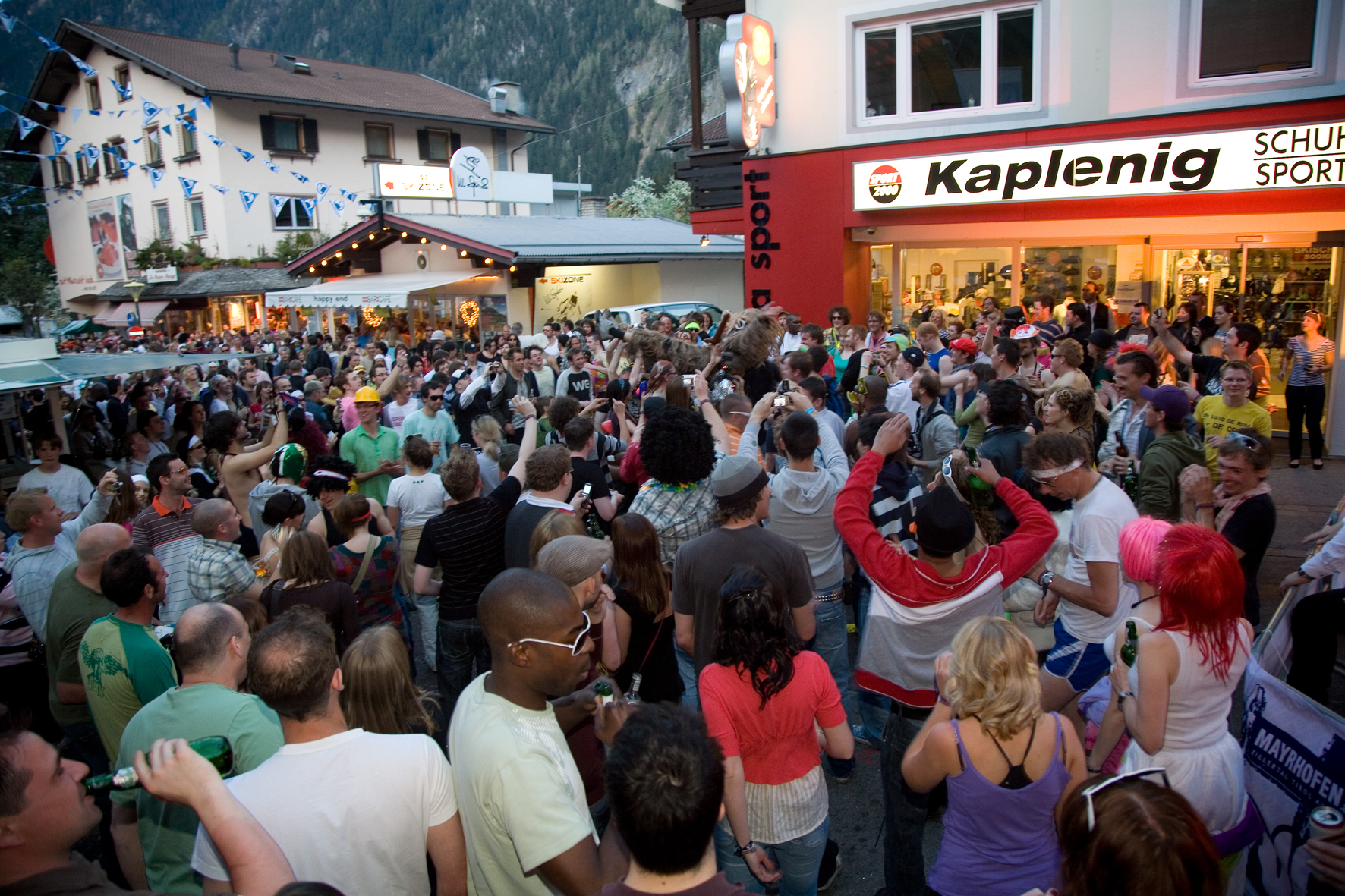
Mayrhofen Bilder Snowbombing3 08

The event has been run since 2000 when it was first held at the French resort of Risoul as an après-ski nightclub promotional exercise started by English promoters from Manchester called Outgoing Ltd. However, since 2005, the Tyrolean resort of Mayrhofen in Austria has hosted the festival which has evolved into Europe's biggest snow and music festival. Originally a DJ and electronic dance music-themed event, live acts were added to the bill in 2008, reflecting the resurgence of indie/rock music. The event's format is designed to combine winter sports (primarily snowboarding) with on-piste and après-ski music performances and themed parties in unusual locations, including an igloo village (pictured), a forest clearing, a traditional remote alpine farmstead and an open-air street party.

Artists who have appeared at Snowbombing include Fatboy Slim, Madness, Pendulum, Example, Magnetic Man, Sub Focus, Tinie Tempah, Chase & Status, Skream & Benga, Mark Ronson, Dizzee Rascal, Dirty Pretty Things, Grandmaster Flash, Foals, 2ManyDJs, The Enemy, Zane Lowe, Freestylers, Mylo, Dave Clarke, Gilles Peterson, Fabio, Grooverider, Tim Westwood, The Prodigy, The Vaccines, Skrillex, The Doves, The Cuban Brothers, Ton!c and James Zabiela.

The event is also notable for giving those who attend an alternative to flying. The Snowbombing Road Trip is not a race but a leisurely international drive from the UK to Mayrhofen, involving collecting points en route, an overnight 'pit stop' in Frankfurt, and an arrival procession in Mayrhofen – which declares the event open.

With around fifty pools and saunas within easy reach, and a backdrop of alpine scenery, Snowbombing regards itself as a festival which, in addition to music, additionally offers luxury and comfort. European television channels and radio Another broadcasters have covered the event, including BBC Radio 1, Channel 4, Eurosport, Canal+ and MTV Europe.

== Previous host resorts ==
- 2005 to present: Mayrhofen, Austria
- 2004: Les Arcs, France
- 2002-2003: Villars, Switzerland
- 2000-2001: Risoul, France

== See also ==
- List of electronic music festivals
