= Valbonnais =

- Commune
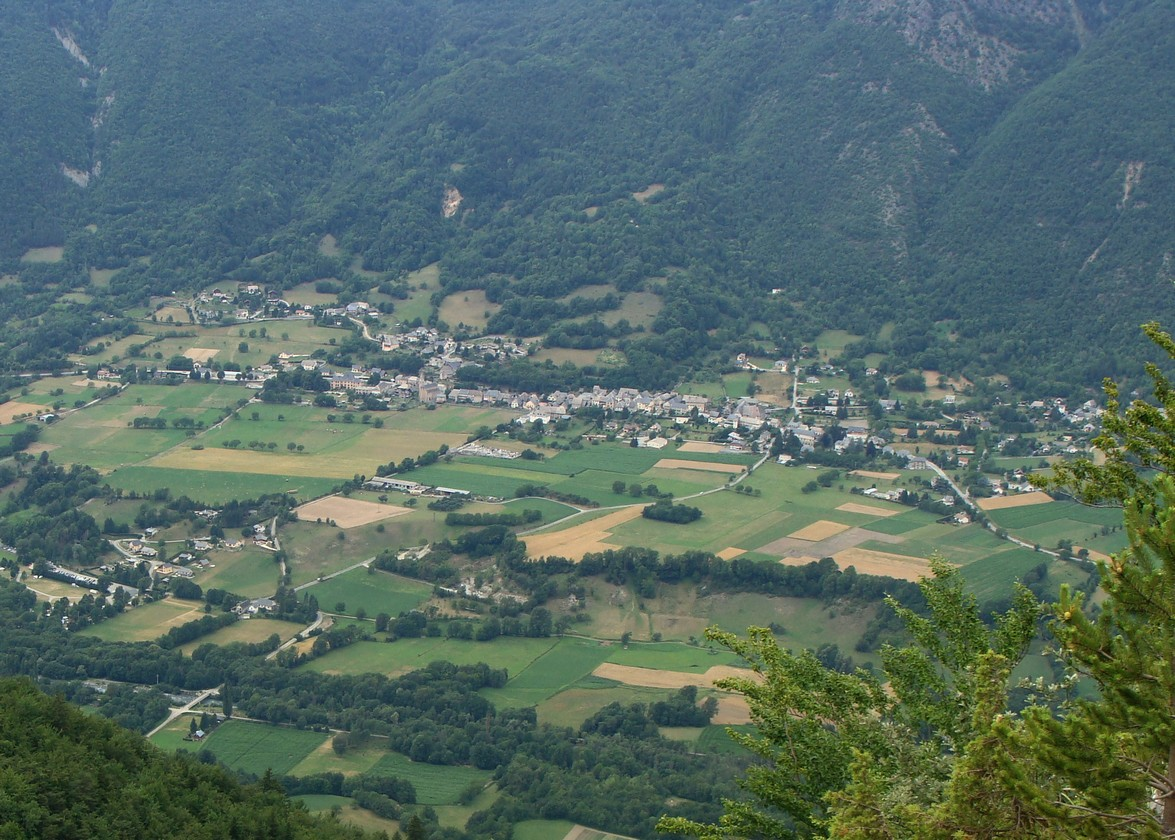
- A view of Valbonnais from the nearby hillside
- Location of Valbonnais
- Location within France Location within Auvergne-Rhône-Alpes
- Coordinates: 44°54′03″N 5°54′18″E
- Country: France
- Region: Auvergne-Rhône-Alpes
- Department: Isère
- Arrondissement: Grenoble
- Canton: Matheysine-Trièves
- Intercommunality: Matheysine

Government
  - Mayor (2020–2026): Gilbert Maugiron
- Area^{1}: 23.95 km^{2} (9.25 sq mi)
- Elevation: 800 m (2,600 ft)
- Highest elevation: 2,544 m (8,346 ft)
- Lowest elevation: 672 m (2,205 ft)
- Population (2023): 520
  - Density: 22/km^{2} (56/sq mi)
- Time zone: UTC+01:00 (CET)
  - Summer (DST): UTC+02:00 (CEST)
- INSEE/Postal code: 38518 /38740
- ^{1} French Land Register data, which excludes lakes, ponds, glaciers > 1 km^{2} (0.386 sq mi or 247 acres) and river estuaries.

Valbonnais (French pronunciation: [valbɔnɛ]) is a commune in the Isère department in southeastern France.

== Population ==
Historical population
Year	Pop.	±% p.a.
1968	521	—
1975	431	−2.67%
1982	434	+0.10%
1990	486	+1.42%
1999	440	−1.10%
2007	494	+1.46%
2012	511	+0.68%
2017	495	−0.63%
2023	520	+0.82%
Source: INSEE

== See also ==
- Communes of the Isère department
