= Risoul =

- Commune
- Main ski resort

- Flag Coat of arms
- Location of Risoul
- Location within France Location within Provence-Alpes-Côte d'Azur
- Coordinates: 44°38′59″N 6°38′27″E
- Country: France
- Region: Provence-Alpes-Côte d'Azur
- Department: Hautes-Alpes
- Arrondissement: Briançon
- Canton: Guillestre

Government
  - Mayor (2026–32): Regis Simond
- Area^{1}: 30.34 km^{2} (11.71 sq mi)
- Elevation: 1,174 m (3,852 ft)
- Highest elevation: 2,573 m (8,442 ft)
- Lowest elevation: 872 m (2,861 ft)
- Population (2023): 664
  - Density: 21.9/km^{2} (56.7/sq mi)
- Time zone: UTC+01:00 (CET)
  - Summer (DST): UTC+02:00 (CEST)
- INSEE/Postal code: 05119 /05600
- ^{1} French Land Register data, which excludes lakes, ponds, glaciers > 1 km^{2} (0.386 sq mi or 247 acres) and river estuaries.

Risoul (French pronunciation: [ʁizul]; Occitan: Risòl) is a commune in the Hautes-Alpes department in southeastern France. It is located in the French Alps between the towns of Briançon and Gap.

Risoul is home to a ski resort that partners with the neighbouring town, Vars, to form the Forêt Blanche ski resort, located between the Queyras and Écrins national parks. The ski resort is sometimes called Risoul 1850 because it is 1,850 meters above sea level.

== History ==
Risoul ski accommodations

The development of a ski resort at Risoul dates from the start of the 1970s. However, the first lift operator (SAPAR) went bankrupt in 1974. The local member of parliament put the council in touch with the Société Foncière de la Vallée des Allues (SFVA). The SFVA started a company called Sermont which took over the lifts and runs them to this day.

The reasons for the bankruptcy in 1974 is still unknown. The Durance valley is remote, the trip from Paris by train or car a long one. The A51 motorway link is still awaiting a financial commitment; likewise, the Montgenèvre rail tunnel to connect Briançon to the TGV network. The nearest major airport is at Turin, across the border in Italy. The resort concentrates its efforts on returning clients but still lacks sufficient long-stay guests. The Forêt Blanche link with its 180 km of pistes is a major marketing tool, especially with tour operators who can include Risoul with transfers Montgenèvre and Serre Chevalier.

The resort was an early adopter of snowboarding. The Surfland snowpark existed for over a decade and is now complemented by rails for beginners and experienced users. The snow park was chosen as a training zone for the 2006 Turin Winter Olympics. The resort believes that the concept of black, red and blue run gradings is outdated and is moving to a series of themed areas such as the freeride zone.

== Ski area ==
The resort has 55 ski lifts, including a cable car and 14 chairs. These give it an uplift capacity of 57,000 skiers per hour. The resort is linked to Vars through the Forêt Blanche ski area giving a total of 180 km (110 mi) of ski runs situated between 1650 and 2750 metres altitude.

Risoul has suffered from a lack of snow over the last couple of seasons with the resort having to rely on artificial snow at the bottom of the ski domain. 30% of the resort runs are covered by snowmaking. Risoul is looking to increase snowmaking capacity but there are limits to water resources in the dry Southern Alps.

== The resort ==
Risoul main ski station and winter park

Risoul is accessible from Turin airport in Italy. It is also possible to transfer from Grenoble, Chambéry or Marseille airports.

Risoul has a capacity of 18,600 beds in multiple apartments and chalets. SARA, which is owned by SFVA, runs 6,000 beds. The resort has had a refurbishment program since 2003. There are also a number of wood chalets that provide the resort with a more traditional atmosphere.

Apres-ski life encompasses a range of cafes, bars and night clubs within a compact town center backing onto the main ski school meeting point. Outdoors there are ice-skating facilities at both Risoul and Vars, snow-shoe walks and skidoo rides. The resort also has a cinema.

In 2000, the resort was the first in Europe to host the Snowbombing dance, music and winter sports festival.

== Population ==
Historical population
Year	Pop.	±% p.a.
1968	289	—
1975	317	+1.33%
1982	447	+5.03%
1990	526	+2.06%
1999	622	+1.88%
2007	646	+0.47%
2012	665	+0.58%
2017	644	−0.64%
2023	664	+0.51%
Source: INSEE
