= Penken =

Coordinates: 47°10′08″N 11°47′59″E

The Penken is a mountain area in the Ziller Valley located in Tyrol, Austria.

The Penken can be reached by modern cable car from the village of Mayrhofen.

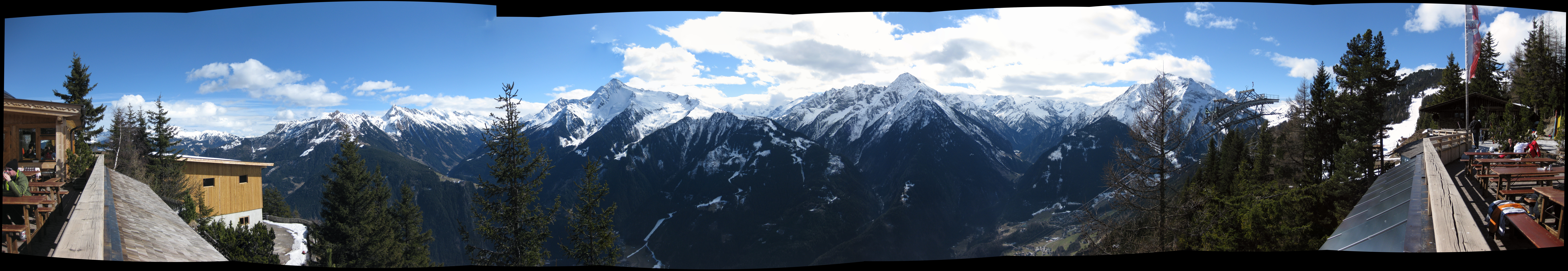
Panoramic view from the Penkenberg, looking south and east towards the Ebenwald.
