= South Tyrol =

Autonomous province in northern Italy

South Tyrol Südtirol (German) Alto Adige (Italian) Südtirol (Ladin)
- Autonomous province
- Autonomous Province of Bolzano – South Tyrol; Autonome Provinz Bozen – Südtirol (Austrian German); Provincia autonoma di Bolzano – Alto Adige (Italian); Provinzia autonoma de Balsan/Bulsan – Südtirol (Ladin)
- Flag Coat of arms
- Anthem: Bozner Bergsteigerlied (unofficial)
- Location of the province of South Tyrol in Italy
- Coordinates: 46°30′0″N 11°21′0″E
- Country: Italy
- Region: Trentino-Alto Adige/Südtirol
- Capital(s): Bolzano
- Municipalities: 115

Government
  - Type: Parliamentary system
  - Body: Landtag of South Tyrol
  - Governor: Arno Kompatscher (SVP)

Area
  - Total: 7,398.38 km^{2} (2,856.53 sq mi)

Population (2026)
  - Total: 542,134
  - Density: 73.2774/km^{2} (189.788/sq mi)

GDP
  - Total: €33.080 billion (2024)
  - Per capita: €61,373 (2024)
- Time zone: UTC+01:00 (CET)
  - Summer (DST): UTC+02:00 (CEST)
- Postal code: 39XXX
- Telephone prefix: 0471, 0472, 0473, 0474
- Vehicle registration: BZ
- HDI (2022): 0.925 very high 5th of 21
- ISTAT code: 021
- Website: www.provincia.bz.it

South Tyrol (Note: English pronunciation: /tɪˈroʊl/ tirr-OHL, /taɪˈroʊl/ ty-ROHL or /ˈtaɪroʊl/ TY-rohl.) (German: Südtirol [ˈzyːtːiˌʁoːl], locally [ˈsyːtiˌroːl]; Italian: Alto Adige [ˈalto ˈaːdidʒe]; Ladin: Südtirol), officially the Autonomous Province of Bolzano/Bozen – South Tyrol, (Note: German: Autonome Provinz Bozen – Südtirol; Italian: provincia autonoma di Bolzano – Alto Adige; Ladin: provinzia autonoma de Balsan/Bulsan – Südtirol.) is an autonomous province in northern Italy. Together with Trentino, South Tyrol forms the autonomous region of Trentino-Alto Adige/Südtirol. The province is Italy's northernmost, with an area of 7,398.38 square kilometres (2,857 sq mi), and has a population of 542,134 as of 2026. Its capital and largest city is Bolzano.

The Atlas Tyrolensis, showing the entire County of Tyrol, printed in Vienna in 1774

South Tyrol has a considerable level of self-government, consisting of a large range of exclusive legislative and executive powers and a fiscal regime that allows it to retain 90% of revenue, while remaining a net contributor to the national budget. As of 2023, it is Italy's wealthiest province and among the wealthiest in the European Union. As of 2024, South Tyrol was also the region with the lowest number of persons at risk of poverty or social exclusion in the EU, with 6.6% of the population compared to the EU mean of 21.4%.

In the wider context of the EU, the province is one of the three members of the Tyrol–South Tyrol–Trentino Euroregion, which corresponds almost exactly to the historical region of Tyrol.

As of 2024, 57.6% of the population used German as its first language; 22.6% of the population spoke Italian, mainly in and around the two largest cities (Bolzano and Merano); 3.7% spoke Ladin, a Rhaeto-Romance language; and 16.1% of the population (mainly recent immigrants) spoke another language in addition to Italian and German. Of 116 South Tyrolean municipalities, 102 have a German-speaking, eight a Ladin-speaking, and six an Italian-speaking majority. The Italianization of South Tyrol and the settlement of Italians from the rest of Italy after 1918 significantly modified local demographics.

== Name ==
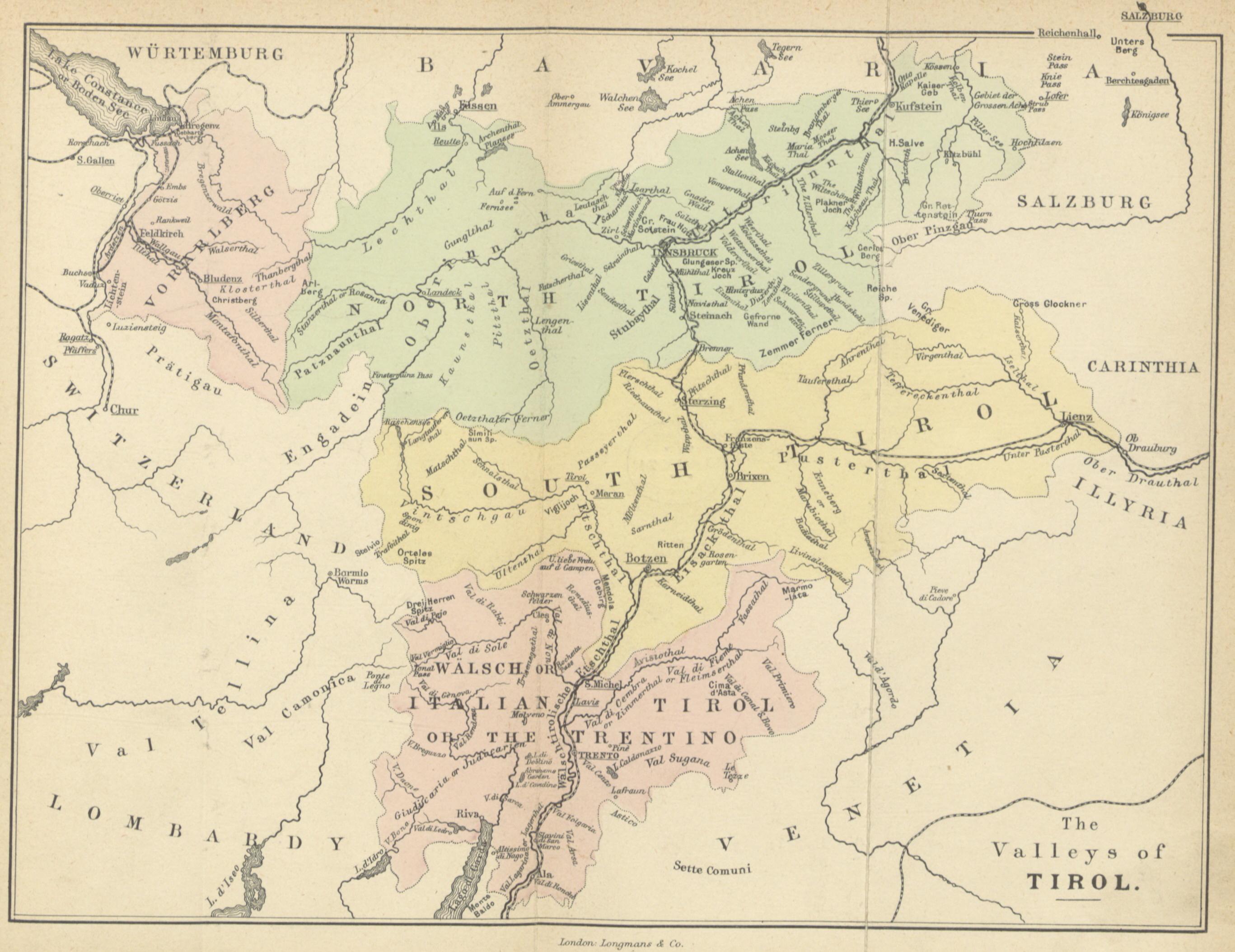
A map from 1874 showing South Tirol with approximately the borders of today's South and East Tyrol

South Tyrol (occasionally South Tirol) is the term most commonly used in English for the province, and its usage reflects that it was created from a portion of the southern part of the historic County of Tyrol, a former state of the Holy Roman Empire and crown land of the Austrian Empire of the Habsburgs. German and Ladin speakers usually refer to the area as Südtirol; the Italian equivalent Sudtirolo (sometimes parsed Sud Tirolo) is becoming increasingly common.

Alto Adige (literally translated in English: "Upper Adige"), one of the Italian names for the province, is also used in English. The term had been the name of political subdivisions along the Adige River in the time of Napoleon Bonaparte, who created the Department of Alto Adige, part of the Napoleonic Kingdom of Italy. It was reused as the Italian name of the current province after its post-World War I creation, and was a symbol of the subsequent forced Italianization of South Tyrol.

The official name of the province today in German is Autonome Provinz Bozen — Südtirol. German speakers usually refer to it not as a Provinz, but as a Land (like the Länder of Germany and Austria). Provincial institutions are referred to using the prefix Landes-, such as Landesregierung (state government) and Landeshauptmann (governor). The official name in Italian is Provincia autonoma di Bolzano — Alto Adige, in Ladin Provinzia autonoma Bulsan — Südtirol.

== History ==
=== Annexation by Italy ===
South Tyrol as an administrative entity originated during the First World War. The Allies promised the area to Italy in the Treaty of London of 1915 as an incentive to enter the war on their side. Until 1918, it was part of the Austro-Hungarian princely County of Tyrol, but this almost completely German-speaking territory was occupied by Italy at the end of the war in November 1918 and was annexed to the Kingdom of Italy in 1919. The province as it exists today was created in 1926 after an administrative reorganization of the Kingdom of Italy, and was incorporated together with the province of Trento into the newly created region of Venezia Tridentina ("Trentine Venetia").

With the rise of Italian Fascism, the new regime made efforts to bring forward the Italianization of South Tyrol. The German language was banished from public service, German teaching was officially forbidden, and German newspapers were censored (with the exception of the fascistic Alpenzeitung). The regime also favoured immigration from other Italian regions.

The subsequent alliance between Adolf Hitler and Benito Mussolini declared that South Tyrol would not follow the destiny of Austria, which had been annexed by Nazi Germany. Instead the dictators agreed that the German-speaking population be transferred to German-ruled territory or dispersed around Italy, but the outbreak of the Second World War prevented them from fully carrying out their plans. Every citizen was given the choice to give up their German cultural identity and stay in fascist Italy, or to leave their homeland for Nazi Germany to retain their cultural identity. This resulted in the division of South Tyrolean families.

In this tense relationship for the population, Walter Caldonazzi from Mals was part of the resistance group around the priest Heinrich Maier, which passed plans and information about production facilities for V-1 rockets, V-2 rockets, Tiger tanks, Messerschmitt Bf 109, and Messerschmitt Me 163 Komet and other aircraft to the Allies. The group planned for an independent Austria with a monarchical form of government after the war, which would include Austria, Bavaria and South Tyrol.

In 1943, when the Italian government signed an armistice with the Allies, the region was occupied by Nazi Germany, which reorganised it as the Operation Zone of the Alpine Foothills and put it under the administration of Gauleiter Franz Hofer. The region was de facto annexed to the German Reich (with the addition of the province of Belluno) until the end of the war. Italian rule was restored in 1945 as the Nazi regime ended.

=== Gruber–De Gasperi Agreement ===
Austrians demonstrating in 1946 at a peace conference in favour of having the southern Tyrol region returned to Austria

After the war, the Allies decided that the province would remain a part of Italy, under the condition that the German-speaking population be granted a significant level of self-government. Italy and Austria negotiated an agreement in 1946, recognizing the rights of the German minority. Alcide De Gasperi, Italy's prime minister, a native of Trentino, wanted to extend the autonomy to his fellow citizens. This led to the creation of the region called Trentino-Alto Adige/Tiroler Etschland. The Gruber–De Gasperi Agreement of September 1946 was signed by the Italian and Austrian Foreign Ministers, creating the autonomous region of Trentino-Alto Adige/Südtirol, consisting of the autonomous provinces of Trentino and South Tyrol. German and Italian were both made official languages, and German-language education was permitted once more. Still, Italians were the majority in the combined region.

This, together with the arrival of new Italian-speaking immigrants, led to strong dissatisfaction among South Tyroleans, which culminated in terrorist acts perpetrated by the Befreiungsausschuss Südtirol (BAS – Liberation Committee of South Tyrol). In the first phase, only public edifices and fascist monuments were targeted. The second phase was bloodier, costing 21 lives (15 members of Italian security forces, two civilians, and four terrorists).

=== Südtirolfrage ===
The South Tyrolean Question (Südtirolfrage) became an international issue. As the implementation of the post-war agreement was deemed unsatisfactory by the Austrian government, it became a cause of significant friction with Italy and was taken up by the United Nations in 1960. A fresh round of negotiations took place in 1961 but proved unsuccessful, partly because of the campaign of terrorism.

The issue was resolved in 1971, when a new Austro-Italian treaty was signed and ratified. It stipulated that disputes in South Tyrol would be submitted for settlement to the International Court of Justice in The Hague, that the province would receive greater autonomy within Italy, and that Austria would not interfere in South Tyrol's internal affairs. The new agreement proved broadly satisfactory to the parties involved, and the separatist tensions soon eased.

The autonomous status granted in 1972 has resulted in a considerable level of self-government, and also allows the entity to retain almost 90% of all levied taxes.

=== Autonomy ===
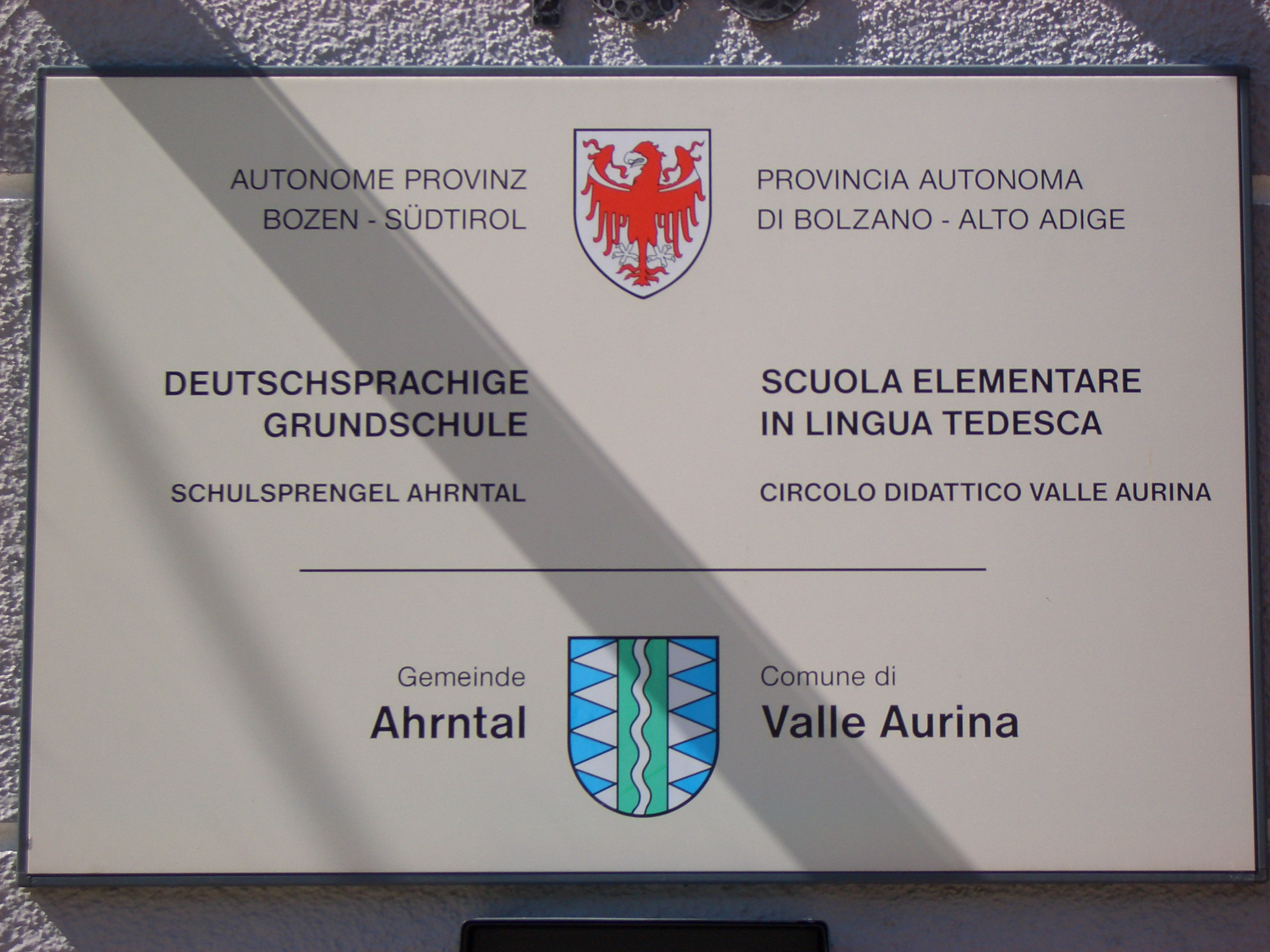
Plaque at a German-speaking school in German (left) and Italian (right)

In 1992, Italy and Austria officially ended their dispute over the autonomy issue on the basis of the agreement of 1972.

The extensive self-government provided by the current institutional framework has been advanced as a model for settling interethnic disputes and for the successful protection of linguistic minorities. This is among the reasons why the Ladin municipalities of Cortina d'Ampezzo/Anpezo, Livinallongo del Col di Lana/Fodom and Colle Santa Lucia/Col have asked in a referendum to be detached from Veneto and reannexed to the province, from which they were separated under the fascist government.

During the COVID-19 pandemic in 2020, South Tyrol maintained regular cross-border activities. It passed a law to reopen early from lockdown, and supplied face masks (via Austria) to the rest of Italy during a national shortage.

=== Euroregion ===
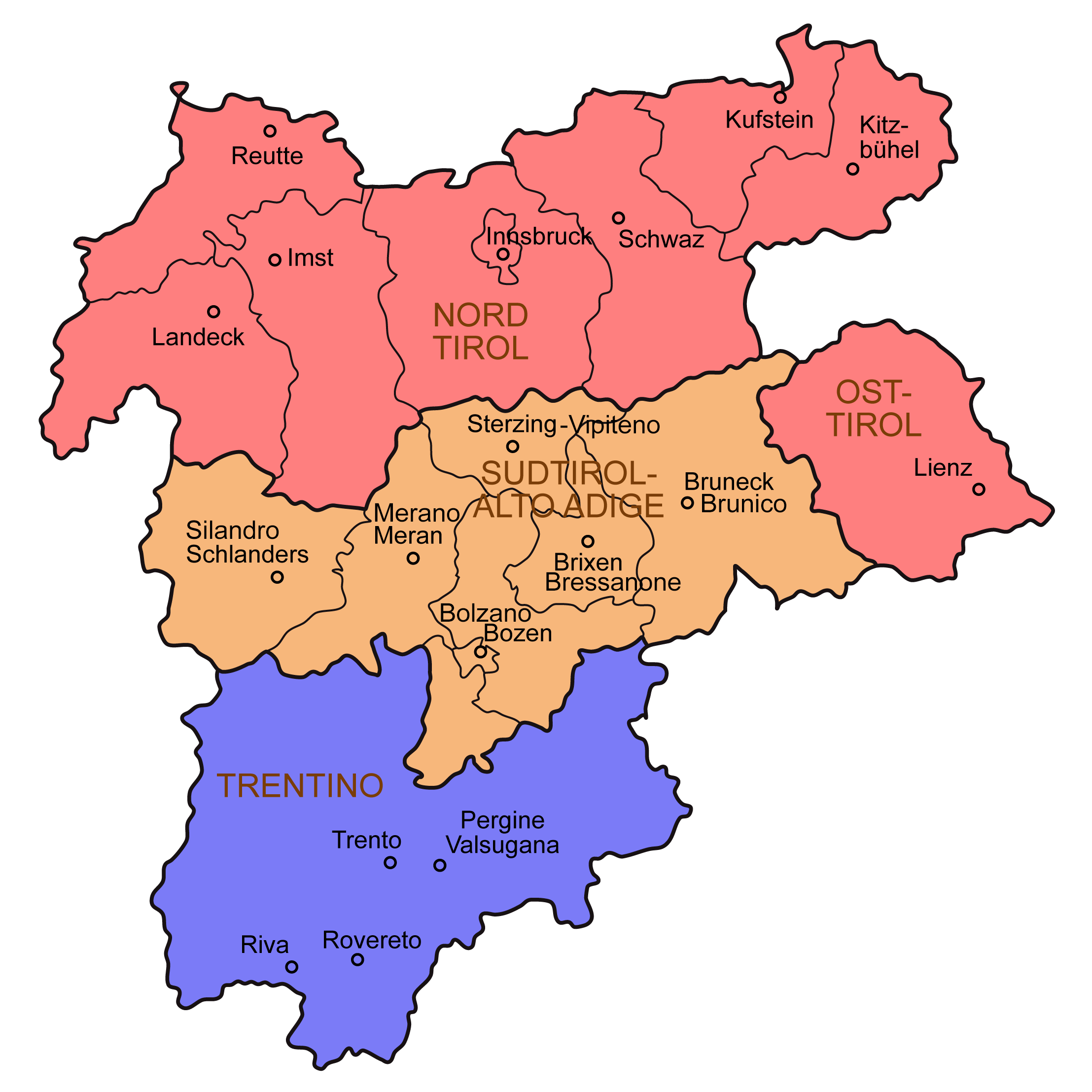
The Euroregion Tyrol-South Tyrol-Trentino corresponds to the historic Tyrol region today (excluding Cortina, Livinallongo, Pedemonte and Valvestino). North and East Tyrol (Austria) South Tyrol (Italy) Trentino (Italy)

In 1996, the Euroregion Tyrol-South Tyrol-Trentino was formed. As well as South Tyrol, the other members are the Austrian federal state Tyrol to the north and east and the Italian autonomous province of Trento to the south. The boundaries of the association correspond to the old County of Tyrol. The aim is to promote regional peace, understanding and cooperation in many areas. The region's assemblies meet together as one on various occasions, and have set up a common liaison office with the European Union in Brussels.

== Geography ==
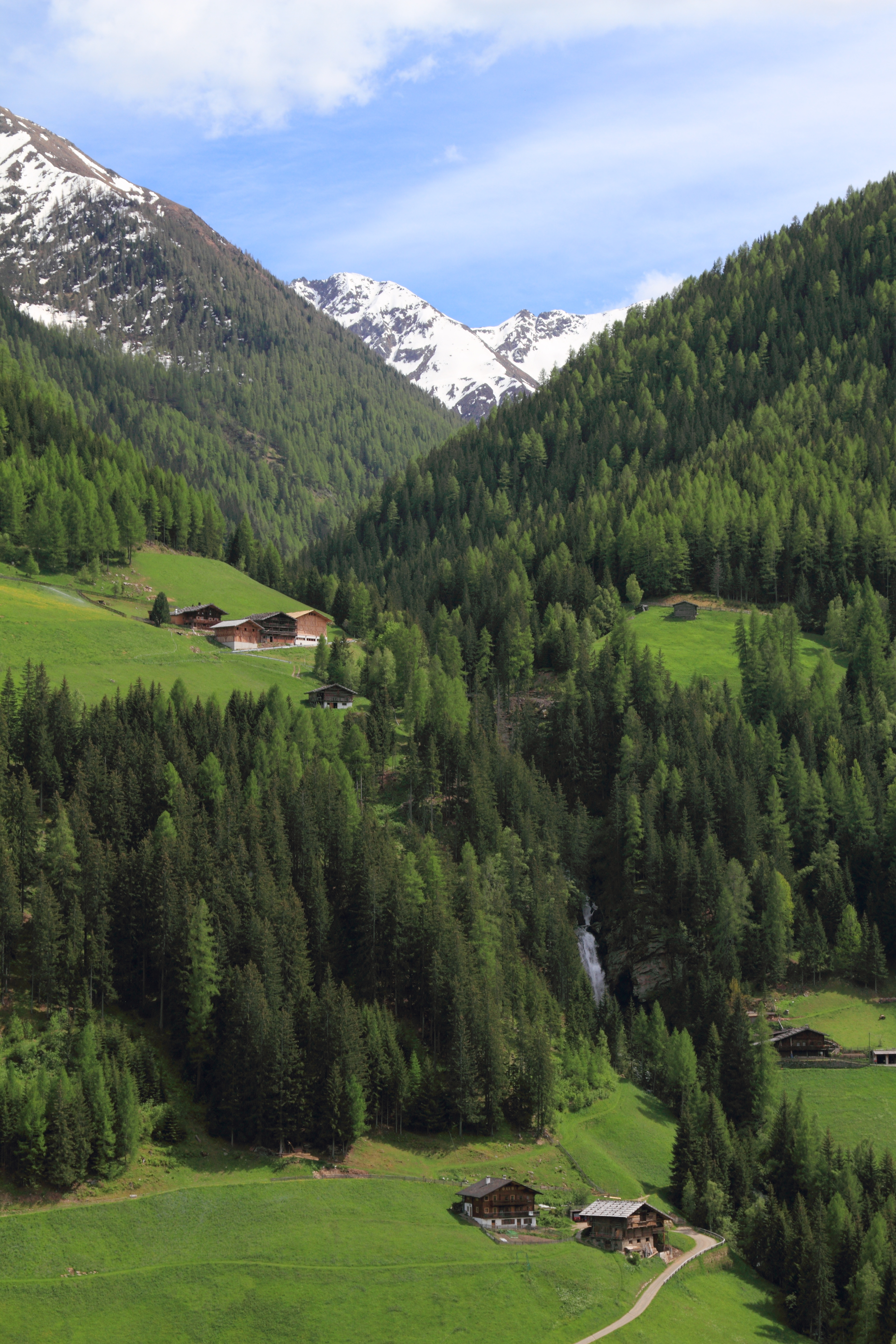
Ulten Valley

South Tyrol is located at the northernmost point in Italy. The province is bordered by Austria to the east and north, specifically by the Austrian states Tyrol and Salzburg, and by the Swiss canton of Graubünden to the west. The Italian provinces of Belluno, Trentino, and Sondrio border to the southeast, south, and southwest, respectively.

The landscape itself is mostly cultivated with different types of shrubs and forests and is highly mountainous.

Entirely located in the Alps, the province's landscape is dominated by mountains. The highest peak is the Ortler (3,905 metres, 12,812 ft) in the far west, which is also the highest peak in the Eastern Alps outside the Bernina Range. Even more famous are the craggy peaks of the Dolomites in the eastern part of the region.

The following mountain groups are (partially) in South Tyrol. All but the Sarntal Alps are on the border with Austria, Switzerland, or other Italian provinces. The ranges are clockwise from the west and for each the highest peak is given that is within the province or on its border.

Name	Highest peak (German/Italian)	metres	feet
Ortler Alps	Ortler/Ortles	3,905	12,811
Sesvenna Range	Muntpitschen/Monpiccio	3,162	10,374
Ötztal Alps	Weißkugel/Palla Bianca	3,746	12,291
Stubai Alps	Wilder Freiger/Cima Libera	3,426	11,241
Sarntal Alps	Hirzer/Punta Cervina	2,781	9,124
Zillertal Alps	Hochfeiler/Gran Pilastro	3,510	11,515
Hohe Tauern	Dreiherrnspitze/Picco dei Tre Signori	3,499	11,480
Eastern Dolomites	Dreischusterspitze/Punta Tre Scarperi	3,152	10,341
Western Dolomites	Langkofel/Sassolungo	3,181	10,436

Located between the mountains are many valleys, where the majority of the population lives.

=== Largest cities and towns ===
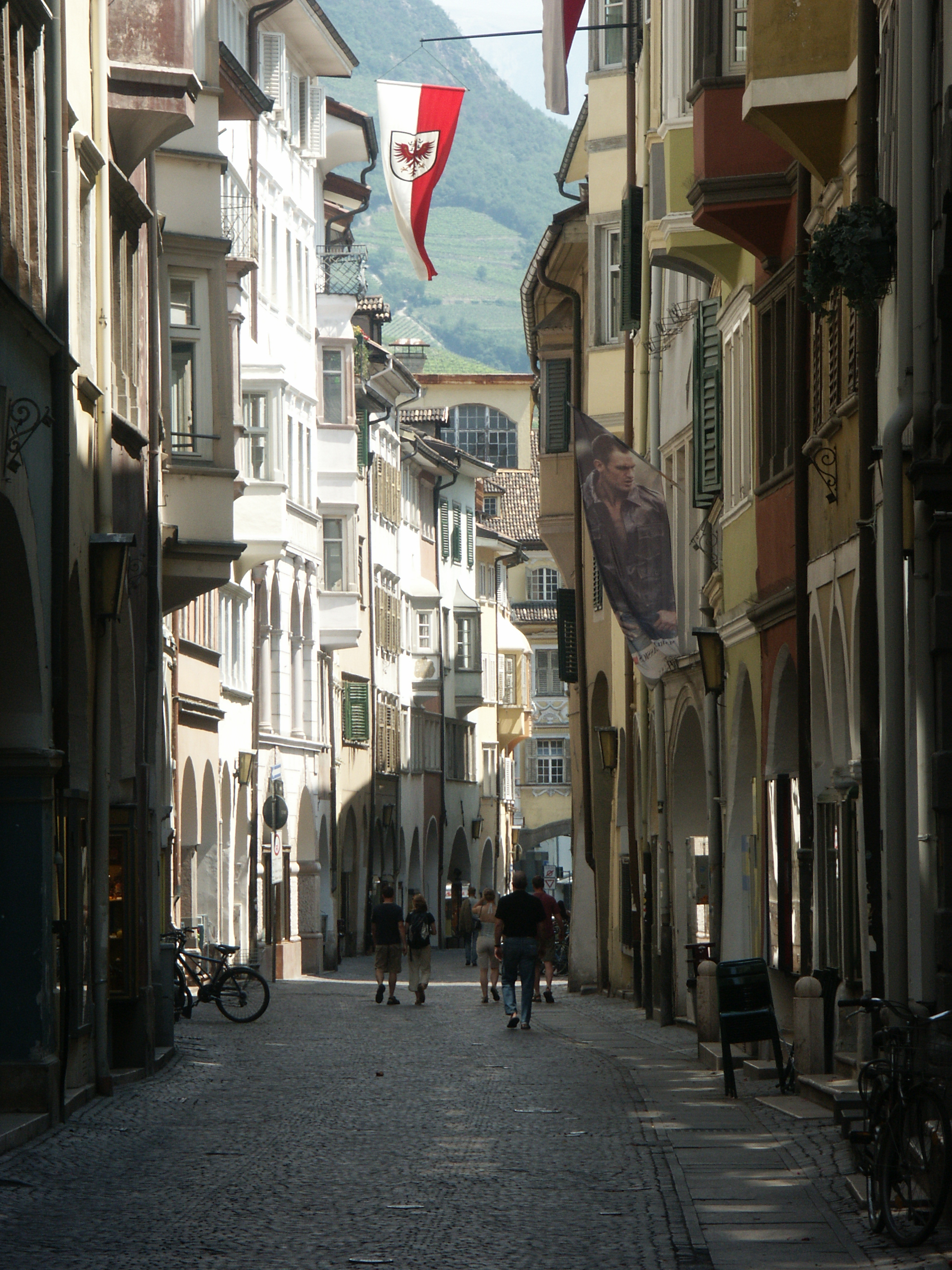
The Laubengasse or Via dei portici, a street in the capital Bolzano

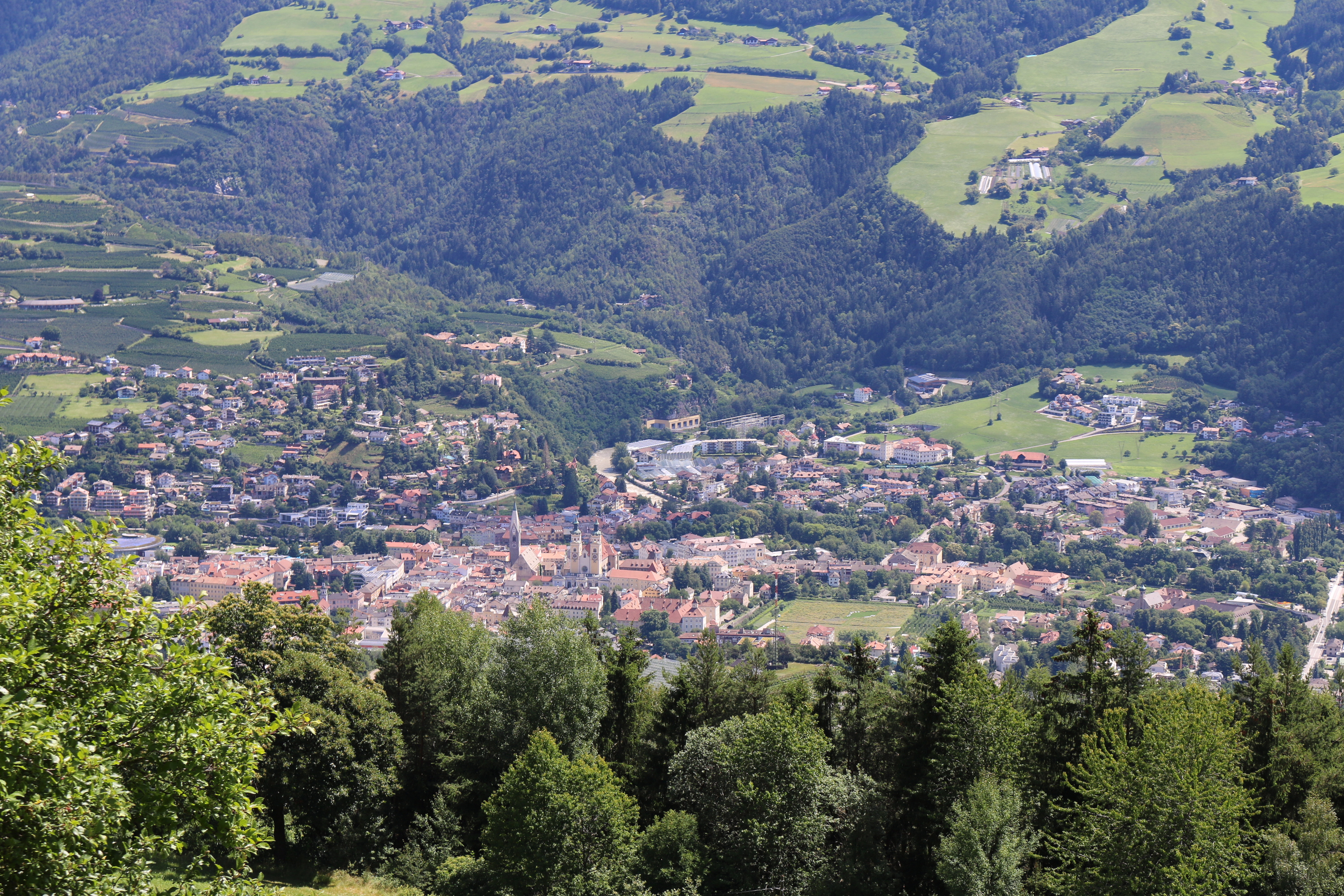
Brixen is the third largest city

German name	Italian name	Ladin name	Population (2026)
Bozen	Bolzano	Balsan, Bulsan	106,901
Meran	Merano	Maran	41,658
Brixen	Bressanone	Persenon, Porsenù	23,350
Leifers	Laives		18,681
Bruneck	Brunico	Bornech, Burnech	17,166
Eppan an der Weinstraße	Appiano sulla Strada del Vino		15,062
Lana	Lana		12,745
Ritten	Renon	Renon	8,332
Kaltern an der Weinstraße	Caldaro sulla Strada del Vino		8,301
Sarntal	Sarentino		7,282
Kastelruth	Castelrotto	Ciastel	7,062
Sterzing	Vipiteno		7,040
Schlanders	Silandro		6,408
Naturns	Naturno		6,101
Ahrntal	Valle Aurina		6,016
Sand in Taufers	Campo Tures		5,877
Neumarkt	Egna		5,518
Latsch	Laces		5,279
Mals	Malles Venosta		5,246
Klausen	Chiusa	Tluses, Tlüses	5,225

=== Climate ===
Climatically, South Tyrol may be divided into five distinct groups:

The Adige valley area, with cold winters (24-hour averages in January of about 0 °C (32 °F)) and warm summers (24-hour averages in July of about 23 °C (73 °F)), usually classified as humid subtropical climate — Cfa. It has the driest and sunniest climate of the province. The main city in this area is Bolzano.

The midlands, between 300 and 900 metres (980 and 2,950 ft), with cold winters (24-hour averages in January between −3 and 1 °C (27 and 34 °F)) and mild summers (24-hour averages in July between 15 and 21 °C (59 and 70 °F)). This is a typical oceanic climate, classified as Cfb. It is usually wetter than the subtropical climate, and very snowy during the winters. During the spring and autumn, there is an extended foggy season, but fog may occur even on summer mornings. Main towns in this area are Meran, Bruneck, Sterzing, and Brixen. Near the lakes in higher lands (between 1,000 and 1,400 metres (3,300 and 4,600 ft)) the humidity may make the climate in these regions milder during winter, but also cooler in summer, making it more similar to a subpolar oceanic climate, Cfc.

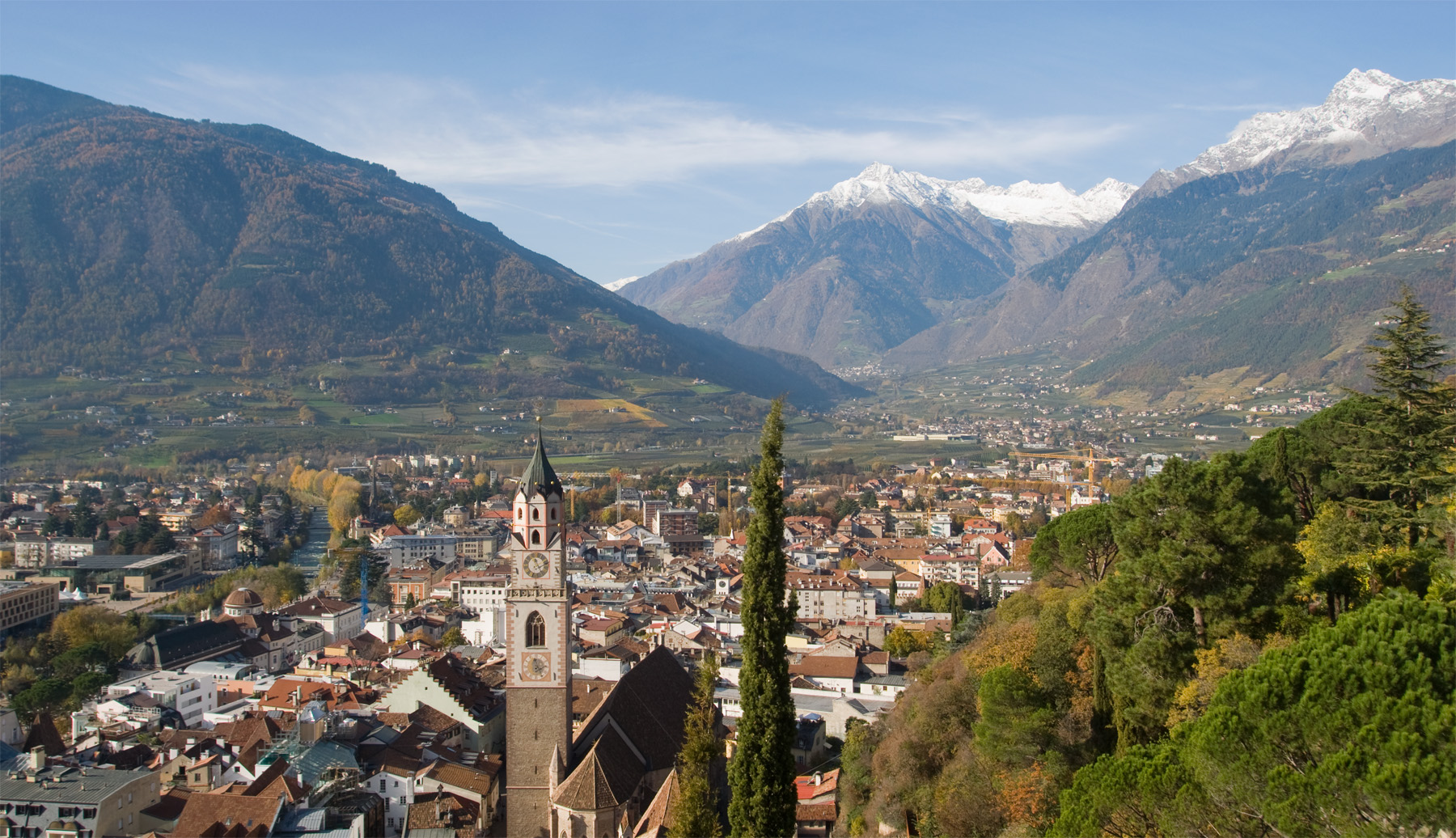
Meran/Merano in the summer

The alpine valleys between 900 and 1,400 metres (3,000 and 4,600 ft), with a typically humid continental climate — Dfb, covering the largest part of the province. The winters are usually very cold (24-hour averages in January between −8 and −3 °C (18 and 27 °F)), and the summers, mild with averages between 14 and 19 °C (57 and 66 °F). It is a very snowy climate; snow may occur from early October to April or even May. Main municipalities in this area are Urtijëi, Badia, Sexten, Toblach, Stilfs, Vöran, and Mühlwald.

The alpine valleys between 1,400 and 1,700 metres (4,600 and 5,600 ft), with a subarctic climate — Dfc, with harsh winters (24-hour averages in January between −9 and −5 °C (16 and 23 °F)) and cool, short, rainy and foggy summers (24-hour averages in July of about 12 °C (54 °F)). These areas usually have five months below the freezing point, and snow sometimes occurs even during the summer, in September. This climate is the wettest of the province, with large rainfalls during the summer, heavy snowfalls during spring and fall. The winter is usually a little drier, marked by freezing and dry weeks, although not sufficiently dry to be classified as a Dwc climate. Main municipalities in this area are Corvara, Sëlva, Santa Cristina Gherdëina.

The highlands above 1,700 metres (5,600 ft), with an alpine tundra climate, ET, which becomes an ice cap climate, EF, above 3,000 metres (9,800 ft). The winters are cold, but sometimes not as cold as the higher valleys' winters. In January, most of the areas at 2,000 metres (6,600 ft) have an average temperature of about −5 °C (23 °F), while in the valleys at about 1,600 metres (5,200 ft), the mean temperature may be as low as −8 or −9 °C (18 or 16 °F). The higher lands, above 3,000 metres (9,800 ft) are usually extremely cold, with averages of about −14 °C (7 °F) during the coldest month, January.

=== Geology ===
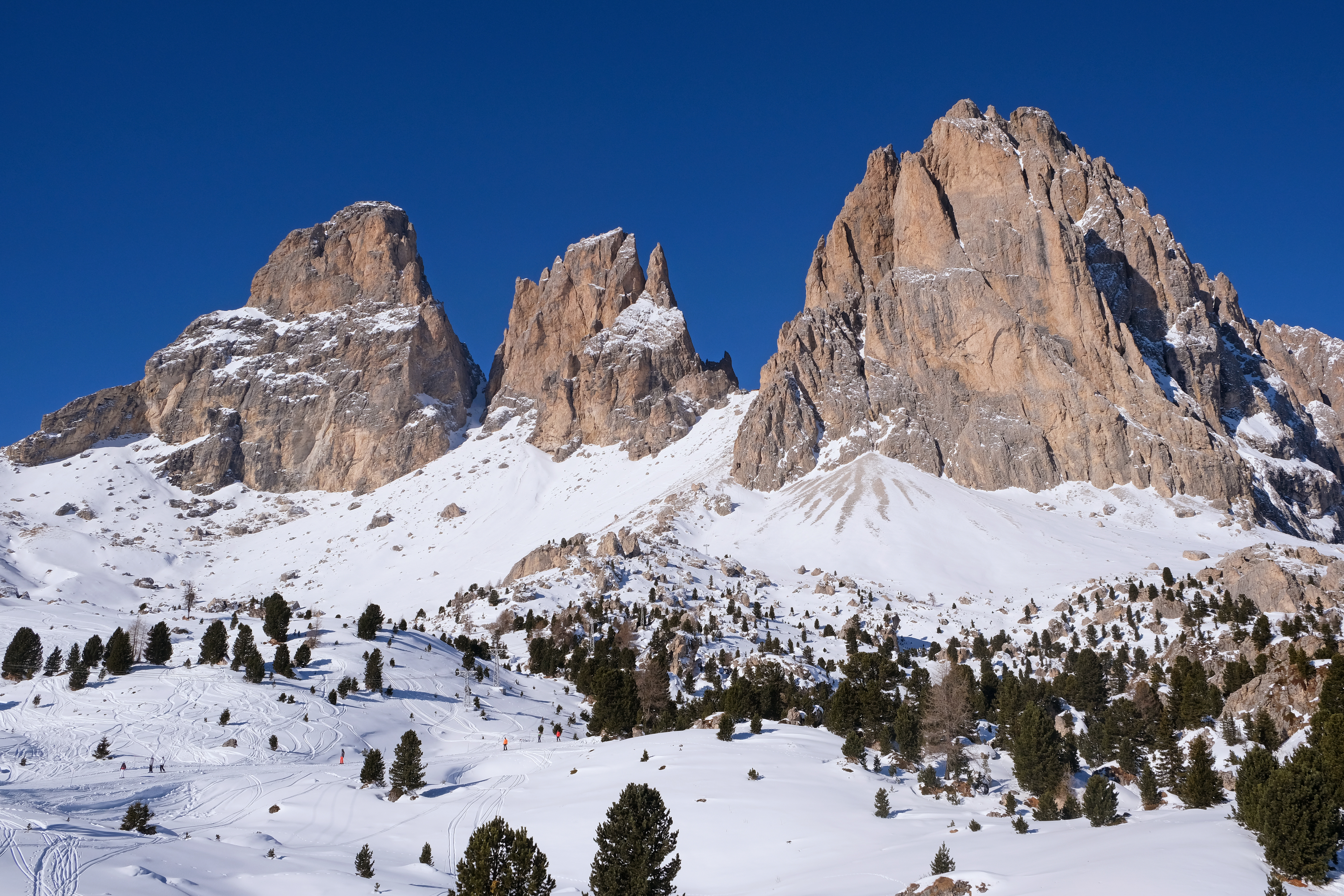
Langkofel group in the western Dolomites in winter

The periadriatic seam, which separates the Southern Alps from the Central Alps, runs through South Tyrol in a southwest–northeast direction. In South Tyrol at least three of the four main structural elements of the Alps come to light: the Southern Alpine comes to light south of the periadriatic suture, the Eastern Alpine north of it, and in the northern part of the country, east of the Brenner Pass, the Tauern window, in which the Peninsular and, according to some authors, the Helvetic are visible.

In South Tyrol, the following structure can be roughly recognized: The lowest floor forms the crystalline basement. About 280 million years ago, in the Lower Permian, multiple magmatic events occurred. At that time the Brixen granite was formed at the northern boundary of the Southern Alps, and at about the same time, further south in the Bolzano area, there was strong volcanic activity that formed the Adige Valley volcanic complex. In the Upper Permian a period began in which sedimentary rocks were formed. At first, these were partly clastic sediments, among which the Gröden sandstone is found. In the Triassic, massive carbonate platforms of dolomitic rocks then formed; this process was interrupted in the Middle Triassic by a brief but violent phase of volcanic activity.

In South Tyrol, the Eastern Alps consist mainly of metamorphic rocks, such as gneisses or mica schists, with occasional intercalations of marble and Mesozoic sedimentary rocks with metamorphic overprint (e.g., in the Ortler or southwest of the Brenner). Various metamorphic rocks are found in the Tauern Window, such as Hochstegen marble (as in Wolfendorn), Grünschiefer (as in Hochfeiler), or rocks of the Zentralgneiss (predominantly in the area of the Zillertal Main Ridge).

The province of South Tyrol has placed numerous geological natural monuments under protection. Among the best known are the Bletterbach Gorge, a 12 km (7½ mile) long canyon in the municipality of Aldein, and the Ritten Earth Pyramids, which are the largest in Europe with a height of up to 30 metres (98 ft).

=== Mountains ===
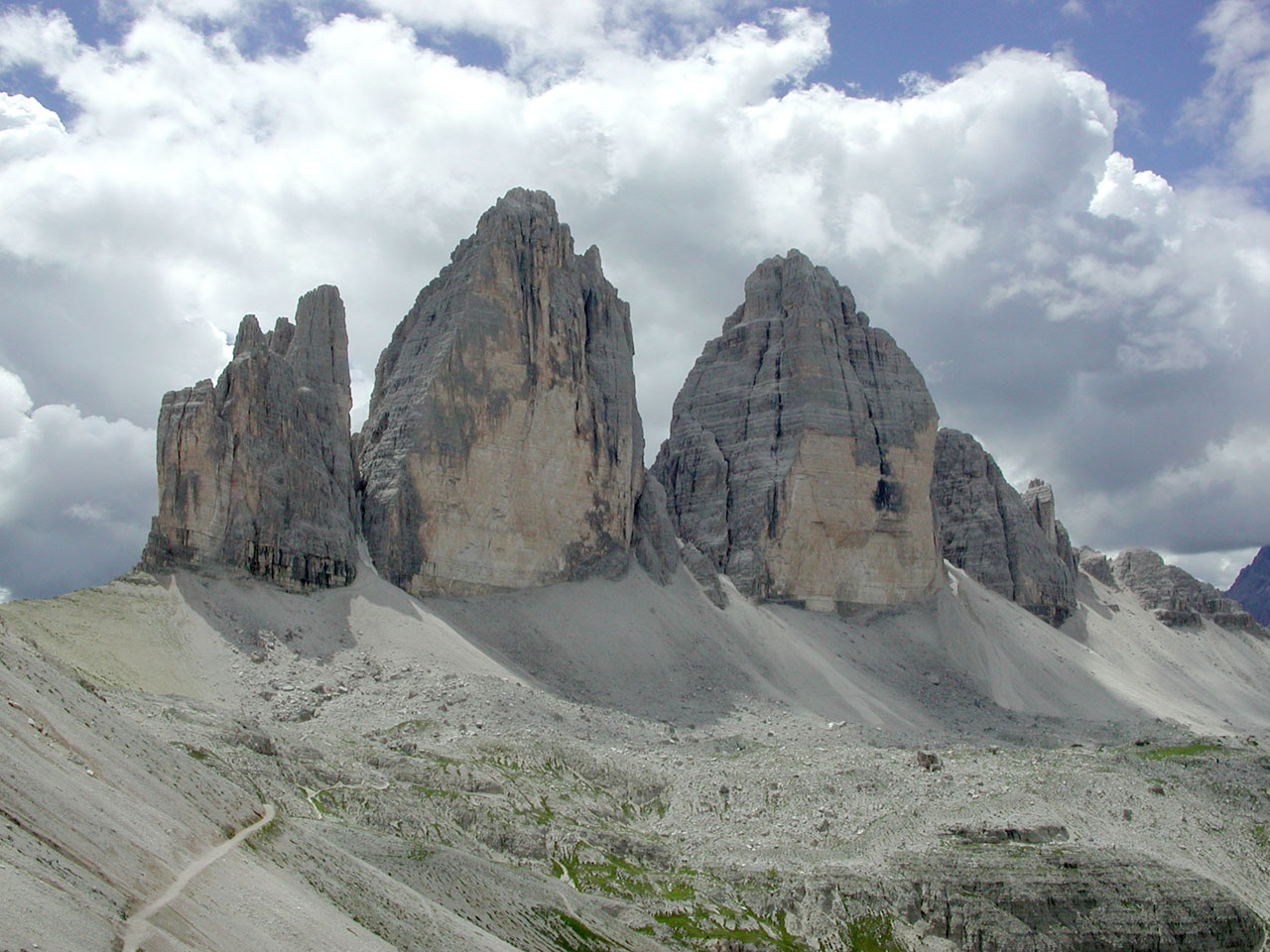
Drei Zinnen-Tre Cime di Lavaredo in the Sexten Dolomites bordering the province of Belluno

According to the Alpine Association, South Tyrol is home to 13 mountain groups of the Eastern Alps, of which only the Sarntal Alps are entirely within national borders. The remaining twelve are (clockwise, starting from the west): Sesvenna Group, Ötztal Alps, Stubai Alps, Zillertal Alps, Venediger Group, Rieserferner Group, Villgratner Mountains, Carnic Alps, Dolomites, Fleimstal Alps, Nonsberg Group and Ortler Alps. Of particular note are the Dolomites, parts of which were recognized by UNESCO in 2009 as a "Dolomite World Heritage Site".

Although some isolated massifs approach 4,000 metres (13,000 ft) and show strong glaciation (especially in the Ortler Alps and on the main ridge of the Alps), South Tyrol is by far dominated by mountains with altitudes of between 2,000 and 3,000 metres (6,600 and 9,800 ft). Among the multitude of peaks, the Dolomites are the highest in the Alps. Among the large number of peaks, three stand out for their alpine or cultural importance: the Ortler (3,905 metres, 12,812 ft) as the highest mountain in South Tyrol, the Schlern (2,563 metres, 8,409 ft) as the country's "landmark" and the Drei Zinnen (2,999 metres, 9,839 ft) as the center of alpine climbing. Other well-known mountains are the Königspitze (3,851 metres, 12,635 ft), the Weißkugel (3,739 metres, 12,267 ft), the Similaun (3,599 metres, 11,808 ft), the Hochwilde (3,480 metres, 11,417 ft), the Sarner Weißhorn (2,705 metres, 8,875 ft), the Hochfeiler (3,509 metres, 11,512 ft), the Dreiherrnspitze (3,499 metres, 11,480 ft), the Hochgall (3,436 metres, 11,273 ft), the Peitlerkofel (2,875 metres, 9,432 ft), the Langkofel (3,181 metres, 10,436 ft) and the Rosengartenspitze (2,981 metres, 9,780 ft).

The extensive mountain landscapes, about 34% of the total area of South Tyrol, are alpine pastures (including the 57 square kilometres (22 sq mi) of the great Alpe di Siusi). Along the main valleys, the mountain ranges descend in many places to valley bottoms over gently terraced landscapes, which are geological remains of former valley systems; situated between inhospitable high mountains and formerly boggy or deeply incised valley bottoms, these areas known as the "Mittelgebirge" (including, for example, the Schlern area) are of particular importance in terms of settlement history.

=== Valleys ===
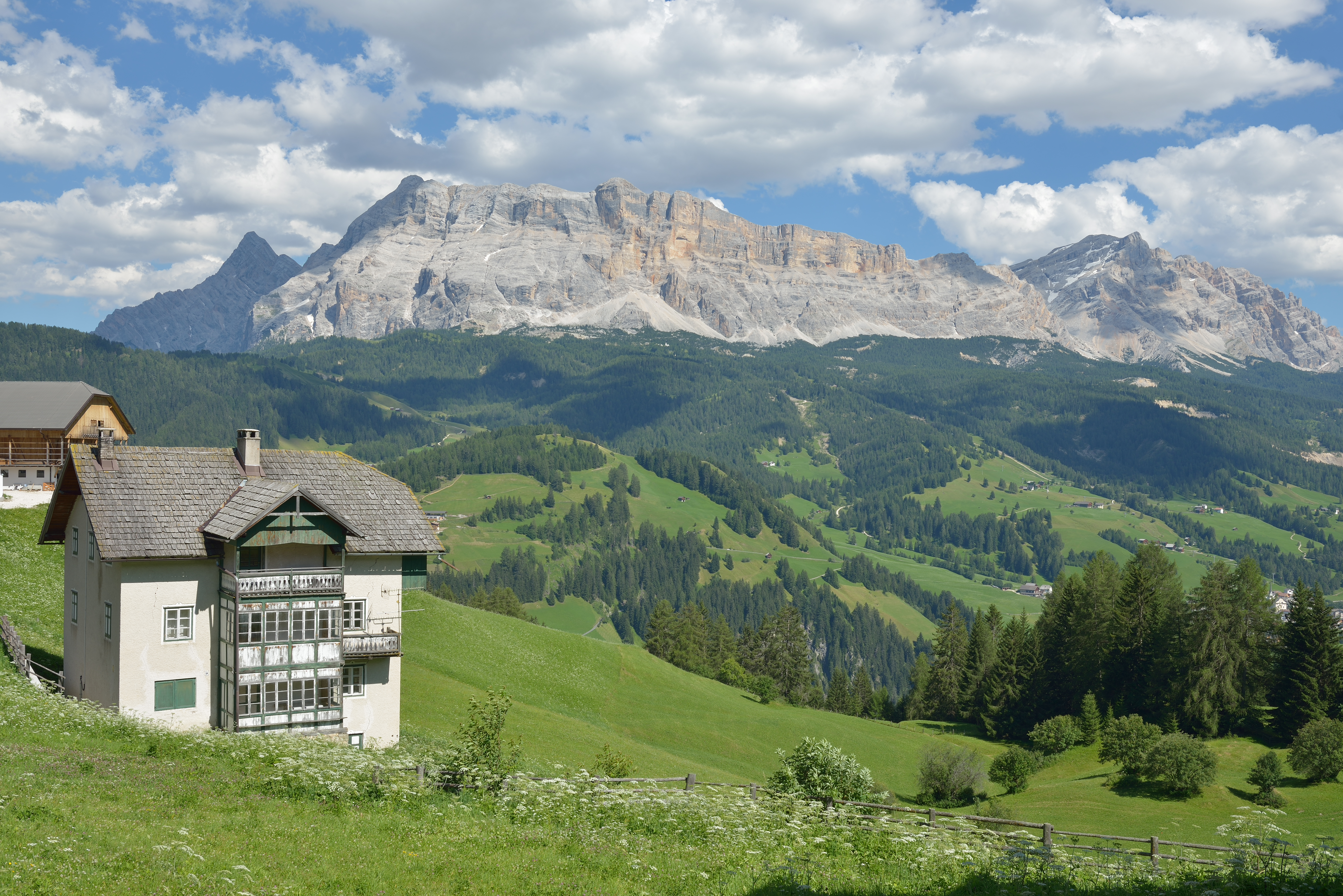
Val Badia, near the town of Badia

The three main valleys of South Tyrol are the Adige Valley, the Eisack Valley and the Puster Valley, formed by the Ice Age Adige glacier and its tributaries. The highest part of the Adige valley in western South Tyrol, from Reschen (1,507 metres or 4,944 feet) to Töll (approx. 500 metres or 1,600 feet) near Merano, is called Vinschgau; the southernmost section, from Bolzano to Salurner Klause (207 metres or 679 feet), is divided into Überetsch and Unterland. From there, the Adige Valley continues in a southerly direction until it merges with the Po plain at Verona.

At Bolzano, the Eisack Valley merges into the Adige Valley. The Eisack Valley runs from Bolzano northeastward to Franzensfeste, where it merges with the Wipp Valley, which runs first northwestward and then northward over the Brenner Pass to Innsbruck. In the town of Brixen, the Eisack Valley meets the Puster Valley, which passes through Bruneck and reaches Lienz via the Toblacher Sattel (1,210 metres or 3,970 feet). In addition to the three main valleys, South Tyrol has a large number of side valleys. The most important and populated side valleys are (from west to east) Sulden, Schnals, Ulten, Passeier, Ridnaun, the Sarntal, Pfitsch, Gröden, the Gadertal, the Tauferer Ahrntal and Antholz.

In mountainous South Tyrol, about 64.5% of the total land area is above 1,500 metres (4,900 ft) above sea level and only 14% below 1,000 metres (3,300 ft). Therefore, a large part of the population is concentrated in relatively small areas in the valleys at an altitude of between 100 and 1,200 metres (330 and 3,940 ft), mainly in the area of the extensive alluvial cones and broad basins. The most densely populated areas are in the Adige valley, where three of the four largest cities, Bolzano, Merano and Laives, are located. The flat valley bottoms are mainly used for agriculture.

=== Hydrography ===
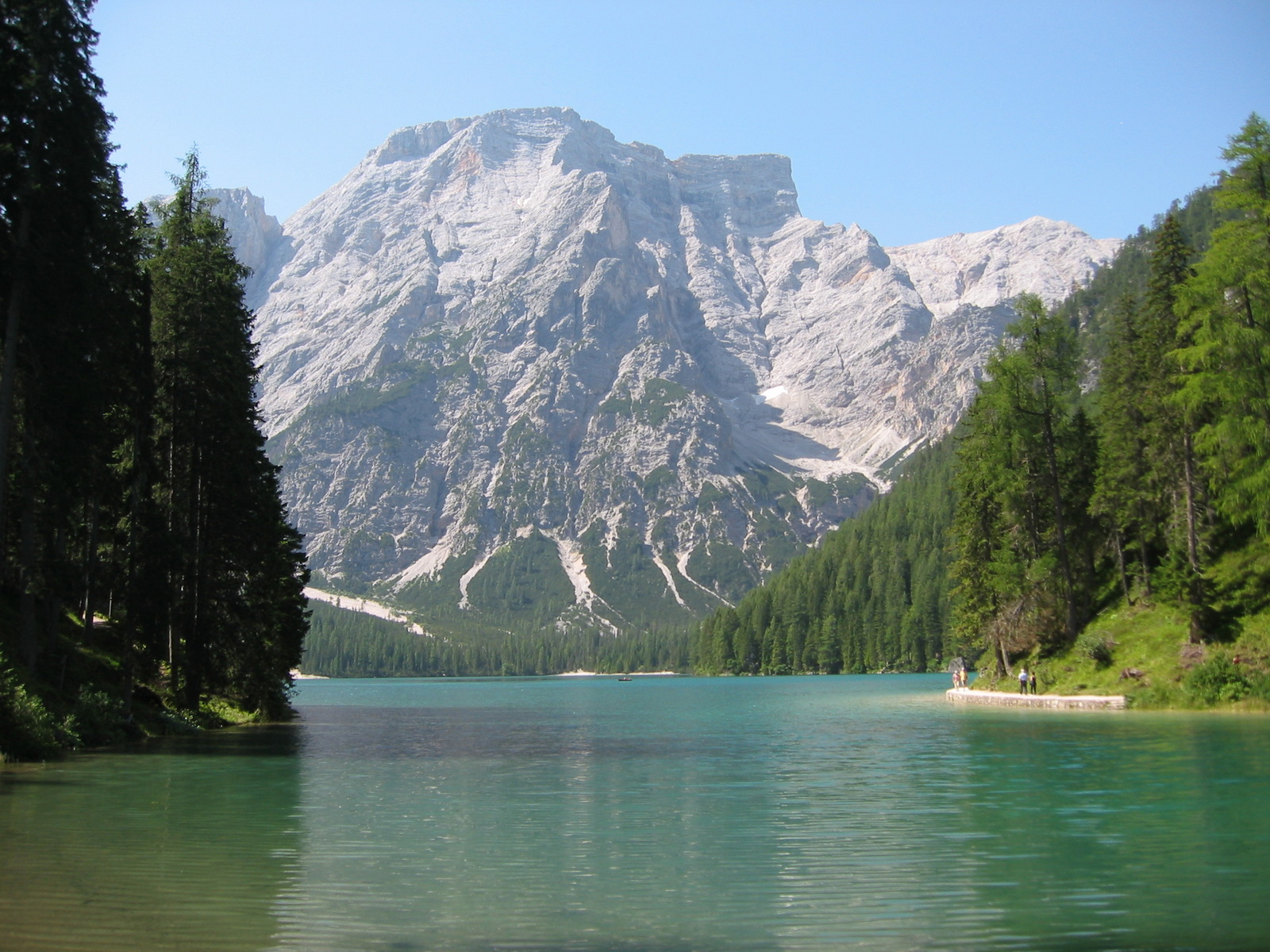
Braies Lake or Pragser Wildsee

The most important river in South Tyrol is the Adige, which rises at the Reschen Pass, flows for a distance of about 140 kilometres (87 mi) to the border at the Salurner Klause, and then flows into the Po Valley and the Adriatic Sea. The Adige, whose total length of 415 kilometres (258 mi) in Italy is exceeded only by the Po, drains 97% of the territory's surface area. Its river system also includes the Eisack, about 100 kilometres (62 mi) long, and the Rienz, about 80 kilometres (50 mi) long, the next two largest rivers in South Tyrol. They are fed by numerous rivers and streams in the tributary valleys. The most important tributaries are the Plima, the Passer, the Falschauer, the Talfer, the Ahr and the Gader. The remaining 3% of the area is drained by the Drava and Inn river systems to the Black Sea and by the Piave river system to the Adriatic Sea, respectively.

In South Tyrol there are 176 natural lakes with an area of more than half a hectare (1¼ acre), most of which are located above 2,000 metres (6,600 ft) altitude. Only 13 natural lakes are larger than 5 ha, and only three of them are situated below 1,000 metres (3,300 ft) altitude: the Kalterer See (215 metres, 705 ft), the Großer (492 metres, 1,614 ft) and the Kleiner Montiggler See (514 metres, 1,686 ft). Fourteen South Tyrolean reservoirs used for energy production include the Reschensee (1,498 metres, 4,915 ft), which with an area of 523 hectares (2.02 sq mi) forms the largest standing body of water in South Tyrol, the Zufrittsee (1,850 metres, 6,070 ft) and the Arzkarsee (2,250 metres, 7,382 ft).

The natural monuments designated by the province of South Tyrol include numerous hydrological objects, such as streams, waterfalls, moors, glaciers and mountain lakes like the Pragser Wildsee (1,494 metres, 4,902 ft), the Karersee (1,519 metres, 4,984 ft) or the Spronser Seen (2,117–2,589 metres, 6,946–8,494 ft).

=== Vegetation ===
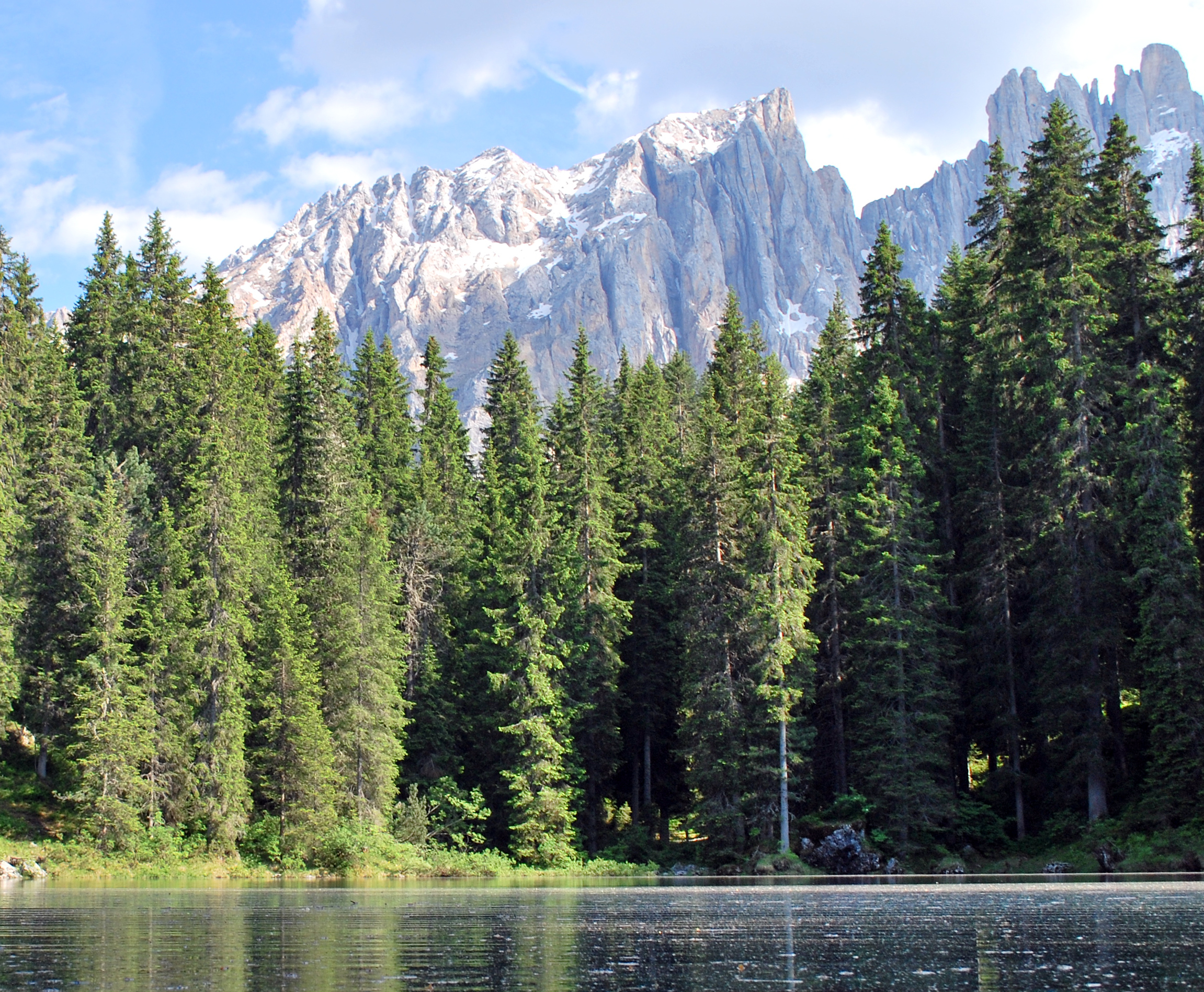
Group of spruce and pine trees in Latemar forest

Approximately 50% of the area of South Tyrol is covered by forests, another 40% is above 2,000 metres (6,600 ft) and thus largely beyond the forest demarcation line, which varies between 1,900 and 2,200 metres (6,200 and 7,200 ft). In each case, more than half of the total forest area is located on land with a slope steeper than 20° and at altitudes between 1,200 and 1,800 metres (3,900 and 5,900 ft). Approximately 24% of the forest area can be classified as protective forest preserving settlements, traffic routes and other human infrastructure. A 1997 study classified about 35% of South Tyrol's forests as near-natural or natural, about 41% as moderately modified and about 24% as heavily modified or artificial. The forests are found in the valley bottoms.

The flat valley bottoms were originally completely covered with riparian forests, of which only very small remnants remain along the rivers. The remaining areas have given way to settlements and agricultural land. On the valley slopes, sub-Mediterranean mixed deciduous forests are found up to 800 or 900 metres (2,600 or 3,000 ft) altitude, characterized mainly by manna ash, hop hornbeam, hackberry, sweet chestnut and downy oak. From about 600 metres (2,000 ft) of altitude, red beech or pine forests can appear instead, colonizing difficult and arid sites (more rarely). At altitudes between 800 and 1,500 metres (2,600 and 4,900 ft), spruce forests are found; between 900 and 2,000 metres (3,000 and 6,600 ft), montane and subalpine spruce forests predominate. The latter are often mixed with tree species such as larch, rowan, white pine and stone pine. The larch and stone pine forests at the upper edge of the forest belt occupy relatively small areas. Beyond the forest edge, subalpine dwarf shrub communities, alpine grasslands and, lately, alpine tundra dominate the landscape as vegetation types.

== Politics ==
Since the end of the Second World War, the political scene of the Autonomous Province of Bolzano has been dominated by the Südtiroler Volkspartei (SVP). Since its foundation, the SVP has consistently held a majority in the Provincial Council (an absolute majority until the elections of 27 October 2013) and has always provided the provincial governor, most members of the provincial government, as well as the mayors of the vast majority of South Tyrolean municipalities. Ideologically, it is a centrist party with Christian-democratic and Christian-social roots, but in practice it functions as a "big tent" (Sammelpartei in German), gathering the support of most German- and Ladin-speaking citizens, while remaining formally open to anyone. The SVP usually governs alone or in alliance with civic lists in smaller municipalities. In towns with stronger Italian-speaking populations, and at national or European level, it historically allied with Christian Democracy; after its collapse, it reached agreements first with center-left coalitions and later with the Democratic Party, while always maintaining full political autonomy.

By the late 20th and early 21st century, the Die Freiheitlichen ("The Libertarians") emerged as the second party in South Tyrol. Founded in 1992 and inspired by Austria's Freedom Party, they position themselves on the right, focusing on defending South Tyrolean identity against what they see as outside influences. They call for stricter limits on immigration, hold conservative stances on civil rights (opposing gender quotas and the demands of the LGBT community), and are the strongest advocates of outright secession of South Tyrol from Italy to form a sovereign state. At times, they have collaborated at national level with the Lega Nord.

More radical secessionist positions are represented by Süd-Tiroler Freiheit ("South Tyrolean Freedom"), founded in 2007 by Eva Klotz, a leading figure of South Tyrolean irredentism, and the Bürger Union für Südtirol (formerly Union für Südtirol). Both movements call for the province's reunification with Austria and demand stronger protection for the German- and Ladin-speaking population. Though generally placed on the right, they prefer not to define themselves in rigid ideological terms. Together, independence-oriented parties have at times reached close to 30% of the vote in provincial elections. Except for Die Freiheitlichen, they usually abstain from fielding candidates in Italian national elections, as a way of rejecting Rome's authority over South Tyrol.

On the left, the Sozialdemokratische Partei Südtirols (Social Democratic Party of South Tyrol) briefly existed between 1973 and 1981, born from the left wing of the SVP but soon reabsorbed by it. Since the late 20th century, moderate left-wing voters have been represented within the SVP itself through the Arbeitnehmer faction. Longer-lasting has been the Verdi del Sudtirolo (South Tyrolean Greens), founded in 1978 by Alexander Langer. An ecological party, the Greens also emphasize interethnic cooperation among the province's language groups and have gradually established themselves as the province's third political force.

Within the Italian-speaking community, Christian Democracy and the Italian Social Movement were long dominant until their dissolution. In the 2003 provincial elections, Alleanza Nazionale was the strongest Italian party; in 2008, Il Popolo della Libertà took that position, though with fewer votes than Alleanza Nazionale and Forza Italia had gained combined. The 2013 provincial elections saw a collapse of the Italian center-right, divided into multiple lists, and the Democratic Party emerged as the strongest Italian party. In 2018, however, Italian-speaking voters shifted back to the right, with the Lega Nord becoming both the largest Italian party and the third-largest overall in South Tyrol.

As for the Ladin community, the Moviment Politich Ladins represents Ladin-specific interests, though with modest results, since most Ladins continue to find representation within the SVP, which maintains a dedicated Ladin section.

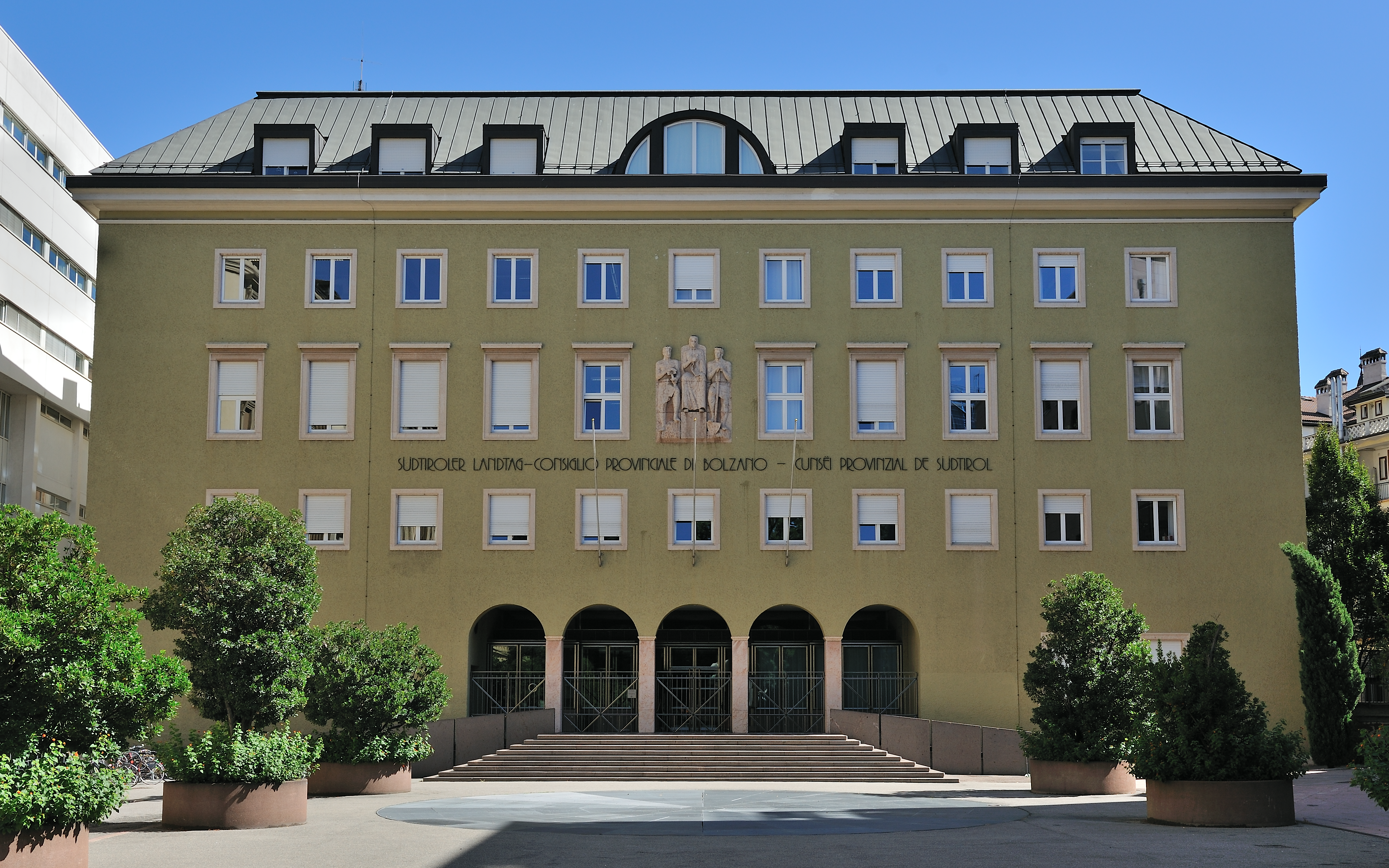
The assembly building of South Tyrol

The local government system is based upon the provisions of the Italian Constitution and the Autonomy Statute of the Region Trentino-Alto Adige/Südtirol. The 1972 second Statute of Autonomy for Trentino-Alto Adige/Südtirol devolved most legislative and executive competences from the regional level to the provincial level, creating de facto two separate regions.

The considerable legislative power of the province is vested in an assembly, the Landtag of South Tyrol (German: Südtiroler Landtag; Italian: Consiglio della Provincia Autonoma di Bolzano; Ladin: Cunsëi dla Provinzia Autonoma de Bulsan). The legislative powers of the assembly are defined by the second Statute of Autonomy.

The executive powers are attributed to the government (German: Landesregierung; Italian: Giunta Provinciale) headed by the Landeshauptmann Arno Kompatscher. He belongs to the South Tyrolean People's Party, which has been governing with a parliamentary majority since 1948. South Tyrol is characterized by long sitting presidents, having only had two presidents between 1960 and 2014 (Silvius Magnago 1960–1989, Luis Durnwalder 1989–2014).

A fiscal regime allows the province to retain a large part of most levied taxes, in order to execute and administer its competences. Nevertheless, South Tyrol remains a net contributor to the Italian national budget.

=== Last provincial elections ===
Party	Votes	%	Seats	+/–
South Tyrolean People's Party	97,092	34.53	13	−2
Team K	31,201	11.09	4	−2
South Tyrolean Freedom	30,583	10.88	4	+2
Greens	25,445	9.05	3	±0
Brothers of Italy	16,747	5.96	2	+1
JWA List	16,596	5.90	2	New
Die Freiheitlichen	13,836	4.92	2	±0
Democratic Party	9,707	3.45	1	±0
For South Tyrol with Widmann	9,646	3.43	1	±0
League–United for Alto Adige	8,541	3.04	1	−3
La Civica	7,301	2.60	1	New
Vita	7,222	2.57	1	New
Five Star Movement	2,086	0.74	–	−1
Enzian	1,990	0.71	–	New
Forza Italia	1,625	0.58	–	±0
Centre-Right	1,601	0.57	–	New
Total	281,219	100.00	35	–
Valid votes	281,219	96.87		
Invalid/blank votes	9,080	3.13		
Total votes	290,299	100.00		
Registered voters/turnout	429,841	67.54		
Source: Official Results

Popular vote
SVP	34.53%
TK	11.09%
STF	10.88%
Grüne	9.05%
FdI	5.96%
JWA	5.90%
dF	4.92%
PD	3.45%
Widmann	3.43%
Lega	3.04%
Civica	2.60%
Vita	2.57%
M5S	0.74%
Enzian	0.71%
FI	0.58%
CD	0.57%

=== List of governors ===
Governors of South Tyrol
Governor	Portrait	Party	Term		Coalition	Legislature	Election
Karl Erckert (1894–1955)		SVP	20 December 1948	19 December 1952	SVP • DC • PSDI • UI (Note: Union of Independents.)	I Legislature	1948
Karl Erckert (1894–1955)		SVP	20 December 1952	15 December 1955 (Note: Died in office.)	SVP • DC	II Legislature	1952
Alois Pupp (1900–1969)		SVP	7 January 1956	14 December 1956	SVP • DC	II Legislature	1952
Alois Pupp (1900–1969)		SVP	15 December 1956	30 December 1960	SVP • DC	III Legislature	1956
Silvius Magnago (1914–2010)		SVP	31 December 1960	3 February 1965	SVP • DC	IV Legislature	1960
Silvius Magnago (1914–2010)		SVP	4 February 1965	16 February 1969	SVP • DC	V Legislature	1964
Silvius Magnago (1914–2010)		SVP	17 February 1969	14 May 1970	SVP • DC	VI Legislature	1968
Silvius Magnago (1914–2010)		SVP	15 May 1970	14 March 1974	SVP • DC • PSI	VI Legislature	1968
Silvius Magnago (1914–2010)		SVP	15 March 1974	10 April 1979	SVP • DC • PSI	VII Legislature	1973
Silvius Magnago (1914–2010)		SVP	11 April 1979	26 April 1984	SVP • DC • PSDI	VIII Legislature	1978
Silvius Magnago (1914–2010)		SVP	27 April 1984	16 March 1989	SVP • DC • PSI	IX Legislature	1983
Luis Durnwalder (b. 1941)		SVP	17 March 1989	10 February 1994	SVP • DC • PSI	X Legislature	1988
Luis Durnwalder (b. 1941)		SVP	11 February 1994	3 February 1999	SVP • PPI • PDS	XI Legislature	1993
Luis Durnwalder (b. 1941)		SVP	4 February 1999	17 December 2003	SVP • DS • PPI • UDAA	XII Legislature	1998
Luis Durnwalder (b. 1941)		SVP	18 December 2003	17 December 2008	SVP • DS • UDAA	XIII Legislature	2003
Luis Durnwalder (b. 1941)		SVP	18 December 2008	8 January 2014	SVP • PD	XIV Legislature	2008
Arno Kompatscher (b. 1971)		SVP	9 January 2014	16 January 2019	SVP • PD	XV Legislature	2013
Arno Kompatscher (b. 1971)		SVP	17 January 2019	17 January 2024	SVP • LAAST	XVI Legislature	2018
Arno Kompatscher (b. 1971)		SVP	18 January 2024	Incumbent	SVP • FdI • DF • LAAST (Note: In January LAAST's provincial minister Christian Bianchi switched to FI.) • LC (Note: External support.)	XVII Legislature	2023

=== Provincial government ===
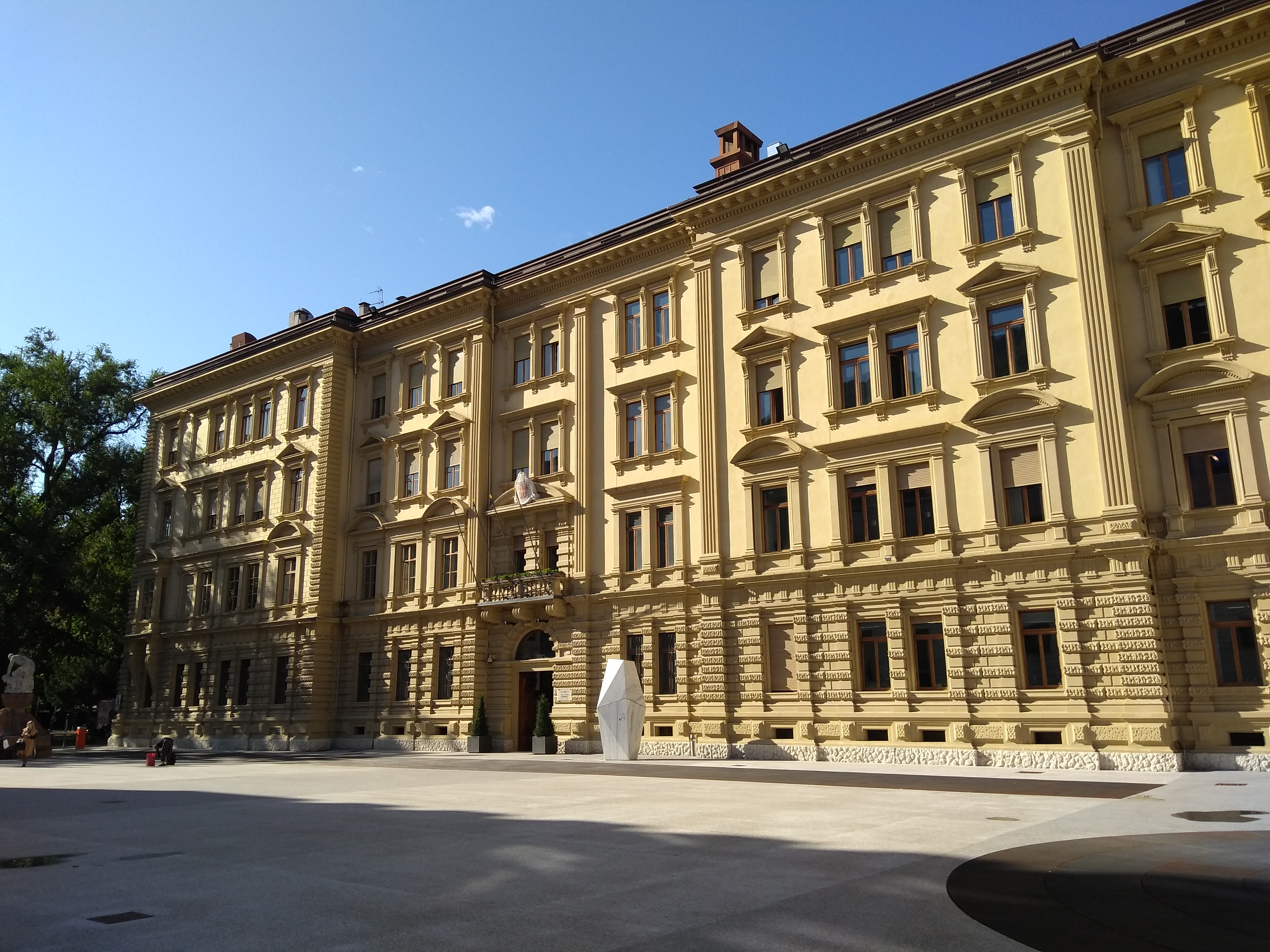
Widmann Palace in Bolzano, seat of the provincial government

The provincial government (Landesregierung) of South Tyrol (formerly also called provincial committee, Giunta provinciale in Italian, Junta provinziala in Ladin) consists of a provincial governor and a variable number of provincial councilors. Currently (2021), the provincial government consists of eight provincial councilors and the provincial governor. The deputies of the provincial governor are appointed from among the provincial councilors. The current governor is Arno Kompatscher (SVP), his deputies are the provincial councilors Arnold Schuler (SVP), Giuliano Vettorato (LN) and Daniel Alfreider (SVP).

The Governor and the Provincial Councilors are elected by Parliament by secret ballot with an absolute majority of votes. The composition of the provincial government must in any case reflect the proportional distribution of the German and Italian language groups in the provincial parliament. In the past, this provision prevented the German-dominated South Tyrol People's Party (SVP) from governing alone and allowed Italian parties to participate in the provincial government. Since the Ladin language group, with just under 4% of South Tyrol's resident population, has little electoral potential, a separate provision in the autonomy statute allows Ladin representation in the provincial government regardless of their proportional representation in the provincial parliament.

=== Administrative divisions ===
The province is divided into eight districts (German: Bezirksgemeinschaften, Italian: comunità comprensoriali), one of them being the chief city of Bolzano. Each district is headed by a president and two bodies called the district committee and the district council. The districts are responsible for resolving intermunicipal disputes and providing roads, schools, and social services such as retirement homes.

The province is further divided into 116 Gemeinden or comuni.

=== Districts ===
Map of South Tyrol with its eight districts

District (German/Italian)	Capital (German/Italian)	Area	Inhabitants
Bozen/Bolzano	Bozen/Bolzano	52 km^{2}	107,436
Burggrafenamt/Burgraviato	Meran/Merano	1,101 km^{2}	97,315
Pustertal/Val Pusteria	Bruneck/Brunico	2,071 km^{2}	79,086
Überetsch-Unterland/Oltradige-Bassa Atesina	Neumarkt/Egna	424 km^{2}	71,435
Eisacktal/Valle Isarco	Brixen/Bressanone	624 km^{2}	49,840
Salten-Schlern/Salto-Sciliar	Bozen/Bolzano	1,037 km^{2}	48,020
Vinschgau/Val Venosta	Schlanders/Silandro	1,442 km^{2}	35,000
Wipptal/Alta Valle Isarco	Sterzing/Vipiteno	650 km^{2}	18,220

=== Municipal administrations ===
The use of the proportional system (considered an appropriate tool to reflect the province's ethnic composition) also applies to the election of municipal councillors, which in South Tyrol is technically separate from that of the mayor. In municipalities with fewer than 15,000 inhabitants, the mayor is the candidate who obtains a relative majority of votes (counting both those for the list and those cast directly for the candidate), while in municipalities with more than 15,000 inhabitants, the winner must surpass 50% of the vote; otherwise, a runoff is held. In both cases, the list or coalition of the winning candidate is not granted any majority bonus.

=== Secessionist movement ===
Given the region's historical and cultural association with neighboring Austria, calls for the secession of South Tyrol and its reunification with Austria have surfaced from time to time among minor groups of German speakers; however, most of the population of South Tyrol does not support a separation. Among the political parties that support South Tyrol's reunification into Austria are South Tyrolean Freedom, Die Freiheitlichen and Citizens' Union for South Tyrol.

== Demographics ==
Historical population
Year	Pop.	±%
1921	256,610	—
1931	282,158	+10.0%
1936	298,290	+5.7%
1951	333,900	+11.9%
1961	373,863	+12.0%
1971	414,041	+10.7%
1981	430,568	+4.0%
1991	440,508	+2.3%
2001	462,999	+5.1%
2011	504,643	+9.0%
2021	532,616	+5.5%
Source: ISTAT

As of 2026, the population is 542,134, of which 49.7% are male, and 50.3% are female. Minors make up 17.9% of the population, and seniors make up 21.4%.

=== Languages ===
Languages of South Tyrol Language majorities by municipality in 2024
- Official: German majority (102 municipalities) Ladin majority (8 municipalities) Italian majority (6 municipalities)
- Source: astat Jahrbuch 2024

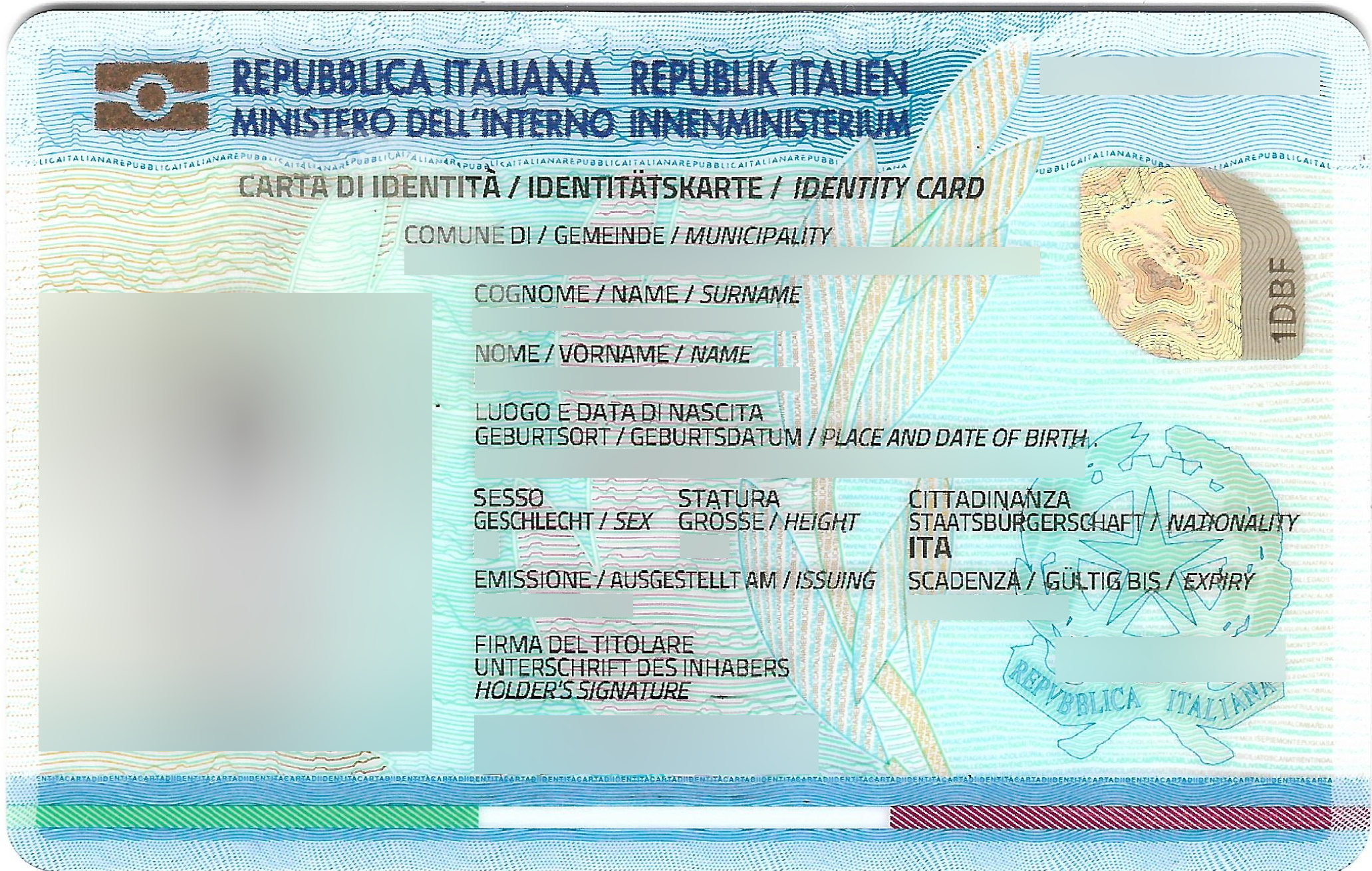
Electronic identity cards are issued in three languages (Italian, German, English) in South Tyrol.

German and Italian are both official languages of South Tyrol. In some eastern municipalities Ladin is the third official language.

A majority of the inhabitants of contemporary South Tyrol speak the native Southern Bavarian dialect of the German language. Standard German plays a dominant role in education and media. All citizens have the right to use their own mother tongue, even at court. Schools are separated for each language group. All traffic signs are officially bi- or trilingual. Most Italian place names were translated from German by Italian Ettore Tolomei, the author of the Prontuario dei nomi locali dell'Alto Adige.

At the time of the annexation of the southern part of Tyrol by Italy in 1920, the overwhelming majority of the population spoke German: in 1910, according to the last population census before World War I, the German-speaking population numbered 224,000, the Ladin 9,000 and the Italian 7,000.

At the 2024 census, German speakers made up 68.61% of the province's Italian citizens, or 57.6% when considering the total population of the autonomous province. In private and public life within the German-speaking community, an Alpine Austro-Bavarian dialect (the South Tyrolean dialect) predominates, characterized by a certain presence of Romance-derived vocabulary. Standard German in its Austrian variant remains the language taught in schools, used in written communication, and in official settings. The German-speaking group is the majority in 102 out of 116 municipalities (reaching as high as 99.52% in Moos in Passeier); in as many as 75 of these municipalities, the German language group constitutes more than 90% of residents.

According to the 2024 ASTAT language census, 26.98% of the Italian citizens who are residents of South Tyrol are Italian-speakers (they were 33.31%, 138,000 of 414,000 inhabitants in 1971), or 22.6% when considering the total population of the autonomous province. The Italian-speaking population lives mainly around the provincial capital Bolzano, where they are the majority (74.7% of the inhabitants). The other five municipalities where the Italian-speaking population is the majority are Merano (51.37%), Laives (74.47%), Salorno (62.49%), Bronzolo (63.46%) and Vadena (61.52%). Italian speakers, coming from various regions, use mainly Standard Italian in daily life, while in the South of South Tyrol (Bassa Atesina) the Trentino dialect is also common.

About 4.4% of South Tyroleans are native speakers of Dolomite Ladin, mainly in Val Gardena and Val Badia, where they form the majority in La Val, San Martin de Tor, Mareo, Badia, Santa Cristina Gherdëina, Sëlva, Corvara, and Urtijëi (with La Val reaching 96.45%).

At the time of the decennial population census, every citizen over the age of 14 is required to declare their belonging to one of the three language groups. Based on the results, positions in public employment, public housing, and subsidies for institutions and associations are allocated according to the ethnic proportional system. Schools are organized separately for each language group. Even some associations attract members predominantly from only one linguistic group, such as the Club Alpino Italiano and the Alpenverein Südtirol, and even Caritas maintains separate sections.

With regard to schooling in particular, teaching is provided exclusively in either Italian or German, according to linguistic affiliation, by native-speaking teachers. A mitigating element is the learning of the other language beginning in the first or second year of primary school (as if it were a foreign language). At the level of the provincial government, there are three distinct departments: one each for German-language, Italian-language and Ladin-language education.

Demographic composition of South Tyrol by language group (1880–2024) – Absolute numbers and percentages
Year	Italian speakers	German speakers	Ladin speakers	Others	Total
1880	6,884 (3.4%)	186,087 (90.6%)	8,822 (4.3%)	3,513 (1.7%)	205,306
1890	9,369 (4.5%)	187,100 (89.0%)	8,954 (4.3%)	4,862 (2.3%)	210,285
1900	8,916 (4.0%)	197,822 (88.8%)	8,907 (4.0%)	7,149 (3.2%)	222,794
1910	7,339 (2.9%)	223,913 (89.0%)	9,429 (3.8%)	10,770 (4.3%)	251,451
1921	27,048 (10.6%)	193,271 (75.9%)	9,910 (3.9%)	24,506 (9.6%)	254,735
1931	65,503 (23.2%)	195,177 (69.2%)	n.a.	21,478 (7.6%)	282,158
1953	114,568 (33.1%)	214,257 (61.9%)	12,696 (3,7%)	4,251 (1.3%)	345,772
1961	128,271 (34.3%)	232,717 (62.2%)	12,594 (3.4%)	281 (0.1%)	373,863
1971	137,759 (33.3%)	260,351 (62.9%)	15,456 (3.7%)	475 (0.1%)	414,041
1981	123,695 (28.7%)	279,544 (64.9%)	17,736 (4.1%)	9,593 (2.2%)	430,568
1991	116,914 (26.5%)	287,503 (65.3%)	18,434 (4.2%)	17,657 (4.0%)	440,508
2001	113,494 (24.5%)	296,461 (64.0%)	18,736 (4.0%)	34,308 (7.4%)	462,999
2011	118,120 (23.3%)	314,604 (62.2%)	20,548 (4.0%)	51,795 (10.5%)	505,067
2024	121,520 (22.6%)	309,000 (57.6%)	19,853 (3.7%)	86,560 (16.1%)	536,933

The linguistic breakdown of residents with Italian citizenship according to the census of 2024 (does not include "Others" in order to calculate the official linguistic proportionality):

Language	Number	%
German	309,000	68.61%
Italian	121,520	26.98%
Ladin	19,853	4.41%
Total	450,373	100%

=== Religion ===
The majority of the population is Christian, mostly in the Catholic tradition. The Roman Catholic Diocese of Bolzano-Brixen corresponds to the territory of the province of South Tyrol. Since 27 July 2011 the bishop of Bolzano-Brixen is Ivo Muser.

==== Catholic Church ====
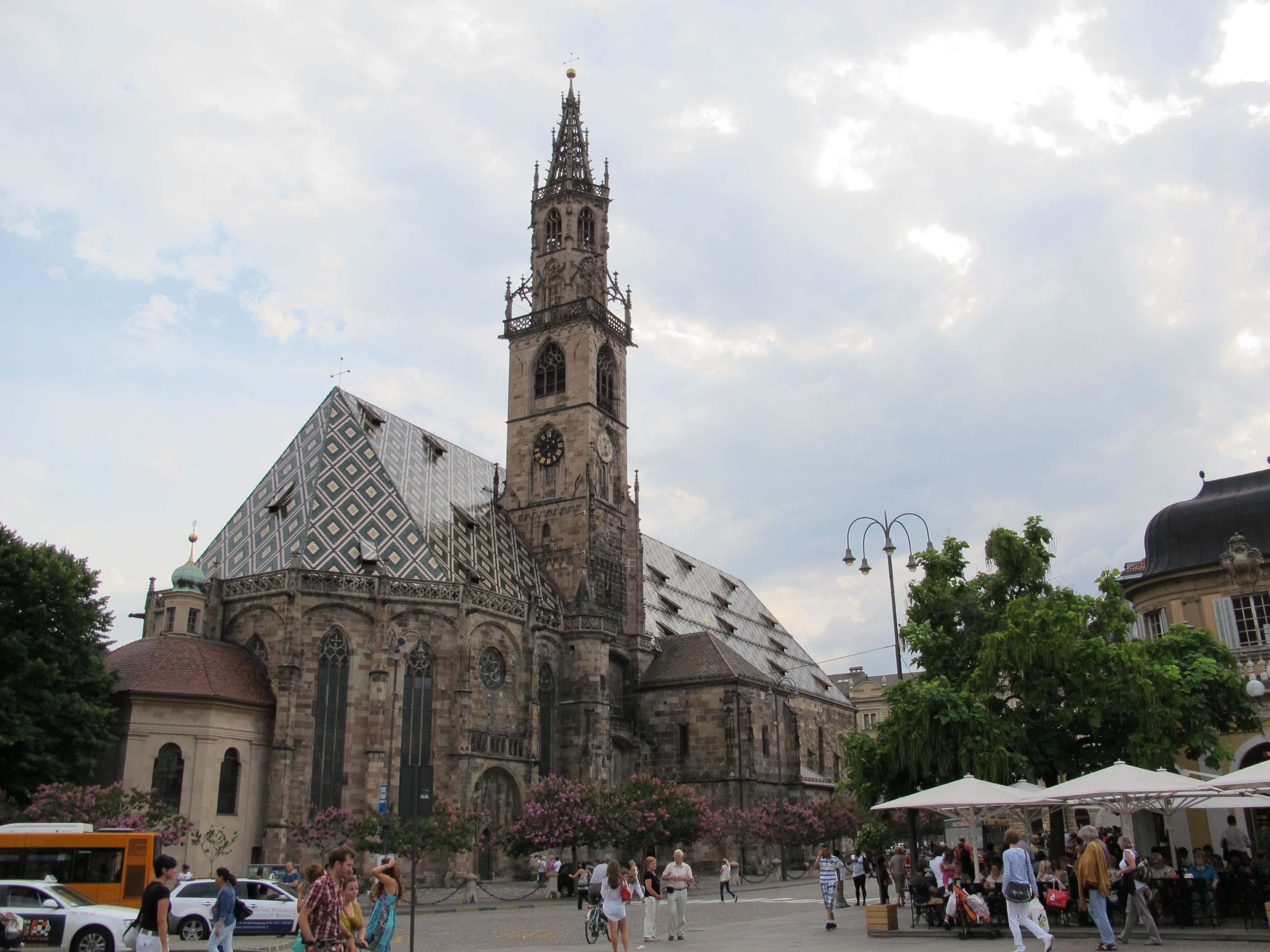
Cathedral of the Assumption of Mary in Bolzano

The vast majority of the population of South Tyrol is baptized Catholic. There is archaeological evidence of early Christian sites in the area as early as Late Antiquity; Säben in the Eisack Valley became an important ecclesiastical center during this period, which was only replaced by Brixen as an episcopal see in the late Middle Ages. The territory of present-day South Tyrol was divided for centuries between the dioceses of Brixen, Chur (until 1808/1816) and Trent (until 1964).

The most famous bishop of Brixen was the polymath Nicholas of Cusa. Important figures of the regional ecclesiastical life in the 19th century were the beatified bishop of Trent Johann Nepomuk von Tschiderer and the mystic Maria von Mörl.

In 1964, with reference to modern political boundaries, the Bishopric of Brixen, which had lost its extensive territories of North and East Tyrol after World War I, was enlarged to form the Diocese of Bolzano-Brixen, whose extension is now identical to that of the province of South Tyrol. Since then, the faithful have been led by Bishops Joseph Gargitter (1964-1986), Wilhelm Egger (1986-2008), Karl Golser (2008-2011) and Ivo Muser (since 2011). The diocese comprises 28 deaneries and 281 parishes (in 2014), 23 its episcopal churches are the Cathedral of Brixen and the Cathedral of Bolzano. Cassian and Vigilius are venerated as diocesan patrons. Important references in the current discourses of the local Catholic Church are St. Joseph Freinademetz and Blessed Joseph Mayr-Nusser.

==== Other communities ====
There is a Lutheran community in Merano (founded 1861) and another one in Bolzano (founded 1889). Since the Middle Ages the Jewish presence has been documented in South Tyrol. In 1901 the Synagogue of Merano was built. As of 2015, South Tyrol was home to about 14,000 Muslims.

=== Immigration ===
As of 2025, immigrants make up 14.8% of the population. The 5 largest foreign countries of birth are Albania, Germany, Austria, Pakistan, and Morocco.

Foreign population by country of birth (2025)
Country of birth	Population
Albania	9,825
Germany	7,864
Austria	5,507
Pakistan	4,933
Morocco	4,475
Romania	3,522
Kosovo	3,314
Ukraine	2,861
North Macedonia	2,804
Slovakia	2,347
India	2,238
Moldova	2,075
Bangladesh	1,742
Peru	1,633
Poland	1,455

== Culture ==
=== Traditions ===
South Tyrol has long-standing traditions, mainly inherited from its membership in the historical Tyrol. The Schützen associations are particularly fond of Tyrolean traditions.

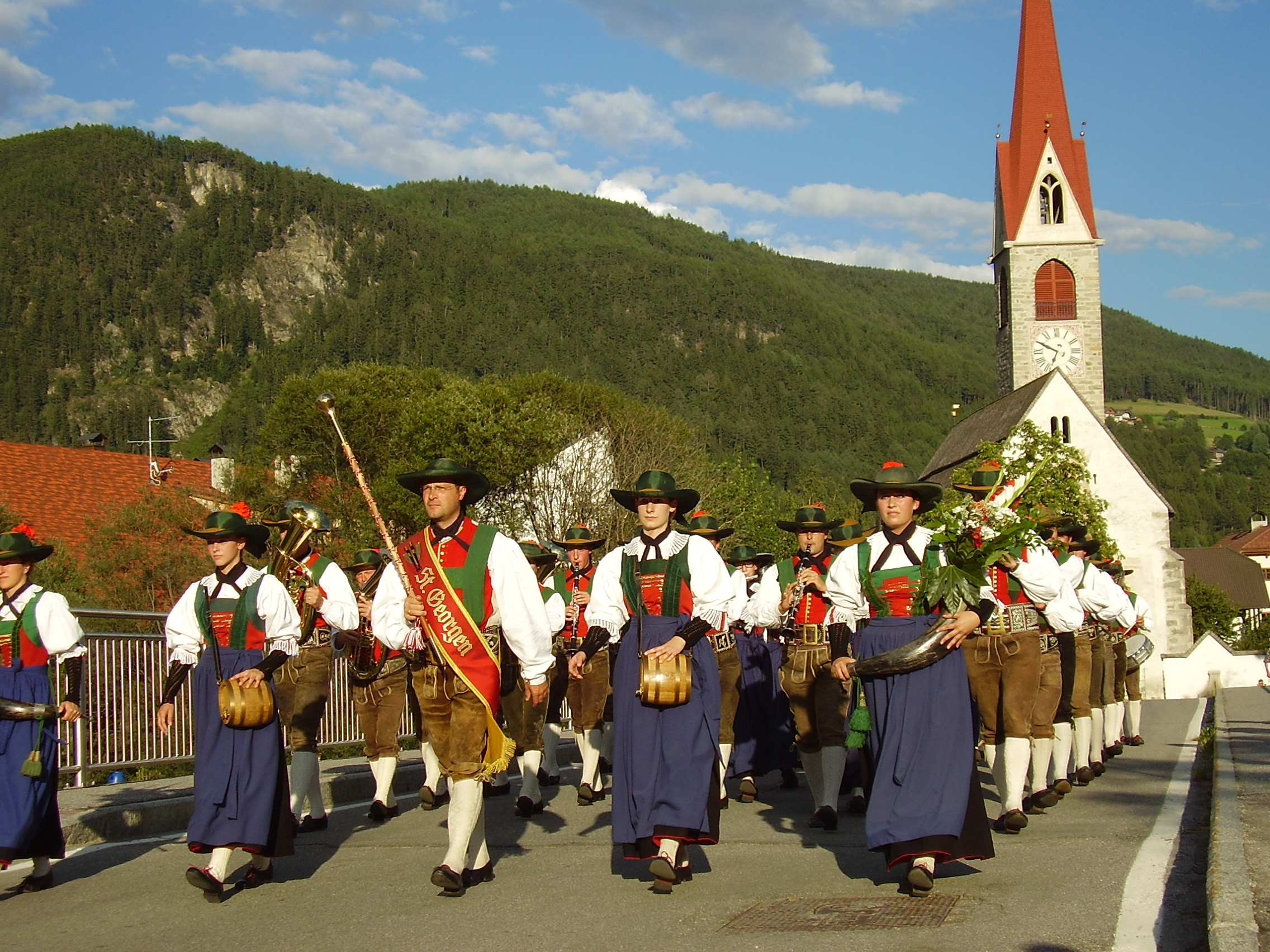
A Musikkapelle in historic Tyrolean costumes

The Scheibenschlagen are the traditional "throwing of burning discs" on the first Sunday of Lent, the Herz-Jesu-Feuer are the "fires of the Sacred Heart of Jesus" that are lit on the third Sunday after Pentecost. The Krampus are disguised demons who accompany St Nicholas.

There are also several legends and sagas linked to the peoples of the Dolomites; among the best known are the legend of King Laurin and that of the Kingdom of Fanes, which belongs to the Ladin mythological heritage.

Alpine Transhumance (from German Almabtrieb), is a farm practice: every year, between September and October, the livestock that stayed on the high pastures is brought back to the valley, with traditional music and dances. Especially, the transhumance between the Ötztal (in Austria) and Schnals Valley and Passeier Valley was recognised by UNESCO as universal intangible heritage in 2019.

=== Education ===
==== Primary and secondary schools ====
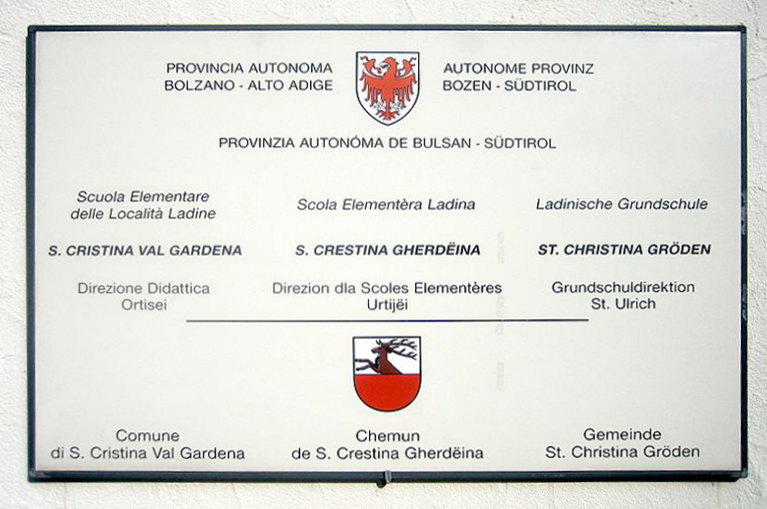
Sign of the Ladin primary school in Santa Christina

The South Tyrolean school system is based in its fundamentals on the standard education system in Italy. Within the framework of South Tyrol's educational autonomy, however, it has been modified by reforms in lower and upper secondary levels to meet local needs. The Italian school system distinguishes between primary school (five years), lower secondary school (scuola media, three years), and upper secondary school (three to five years). Primary and lower secondary school are conceived as comprehensive schools. After completing lower secondary school, pupils are free to choose among various five-year upper secondary schools, including grammar schools, business-oriented high schools, and technical high schools, or alternatively to attend a three- to four-year vocational school. A high school diploma is obtained by passing the state final examination.

A peculiarity of South Tyrol is the coexistence of German, Italian, and Ladin schools. The schools of the three language groups differ essentially in the language of instruction: in German schools, lessons are taught in German; in Italian schools, in Italian; in Ladin schools, roughly equally in German and Italian, while Ladin is used only as a separate subject. In addition to public schools, there are also several private schools in South Tyrol, such as the Franciscan High School in Bolzano and the Vinzentinum in Brixen. Since 2003, compulsory school students have regularly taken part in evaluations coordinated by the OECD, whose results are published at the provincial level as separate South Tyrolean PISA results.

==== Universities ====
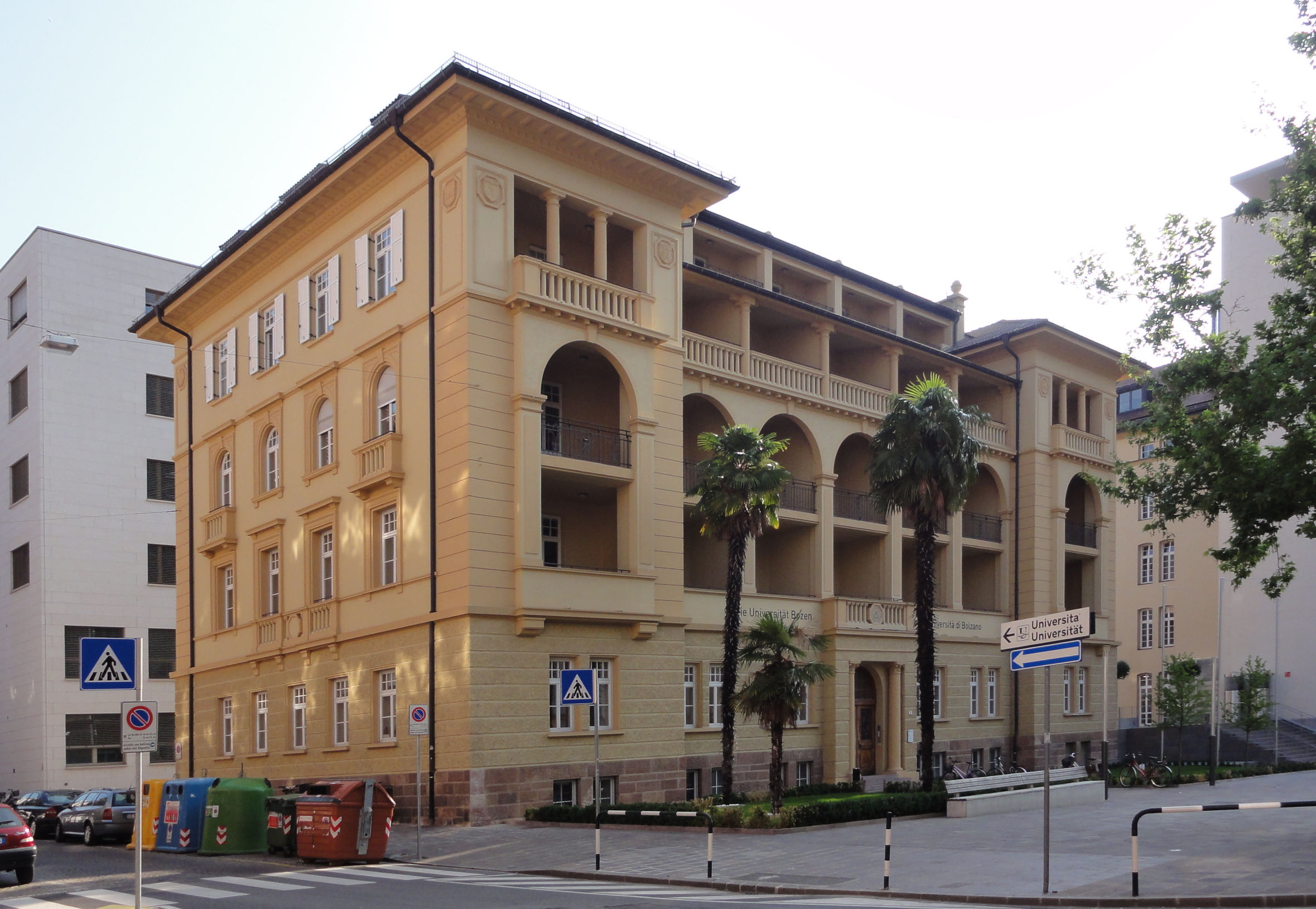
Rectorate building of the Free University of Bozen-Bolzano

In terms of higher education, the University of Innsbruck, founded in 1669, has traditionally been regarded as the "regional university" for the federal state of Tyrol, South Tyrol, Vorarlberg, and the Principality of Liechtenstein. In South Tyrol, the Free University of Bozen-Bolzano (FUB) was established from 1997 as a complementary institution. It has three campuses (Bozen, Brixen, and Bruneck), housing the faculties of Economics, Computer Science, Design and Arts, Natural Sciences and Engineering, and Education. In addition to the FUB, institutions such as the Philosophical-Theological College of Brixen, the Claudiana University College for Health Professions, and the "Claudio Monteverdi" Conservatory in Bozen provide specialized higher education. The largest representative body for South Tyrolean students is sh.asus.

=== Architecture ===
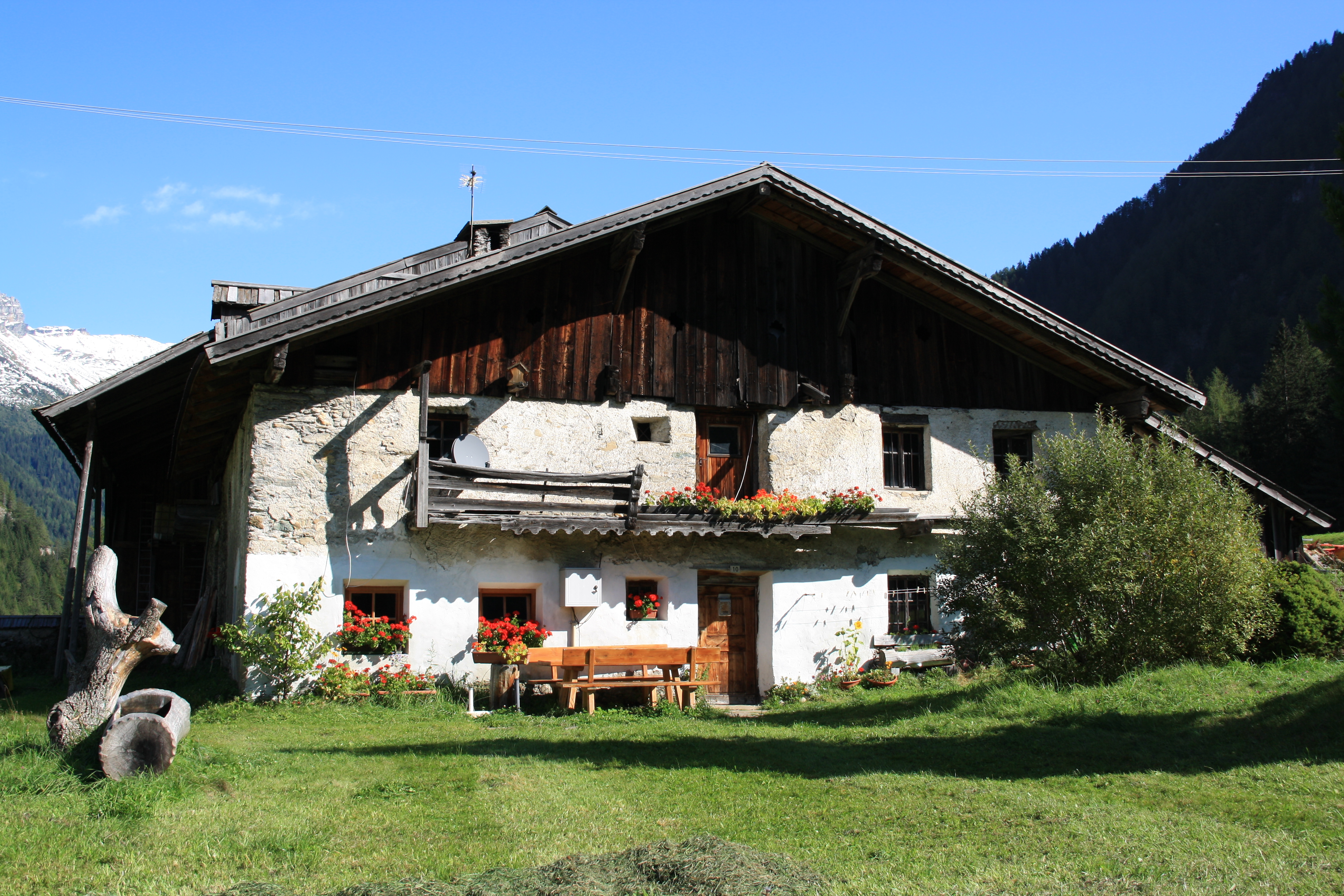
Tyrolean architecture

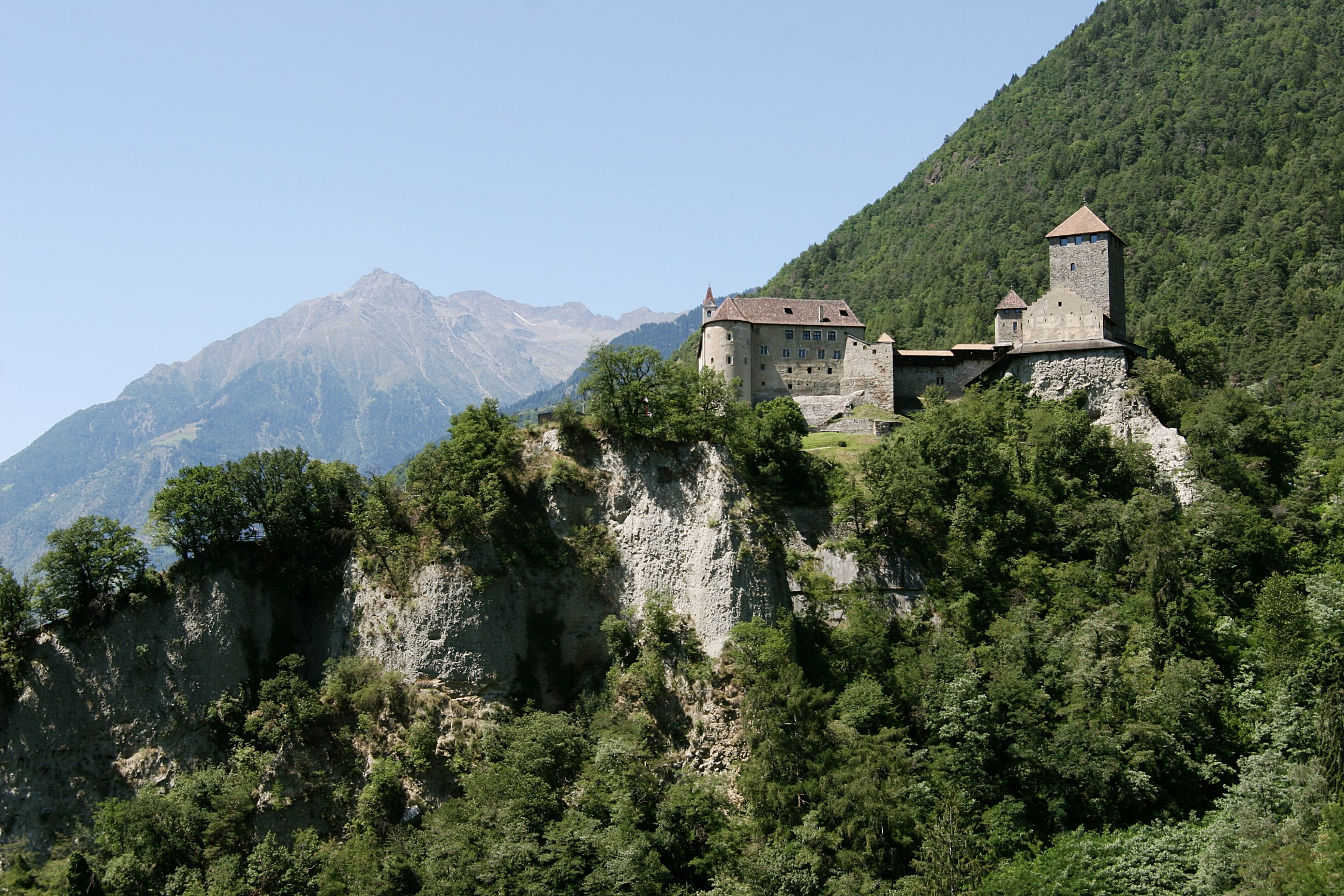
Tyrol Castle, which gave the wider region its name

The region features a large number of castles and churches. Many of the castles and Ansitze were built by the local nobility and the Habsburg rulers. See List of castles in South Tyrol.

=== Museums ===
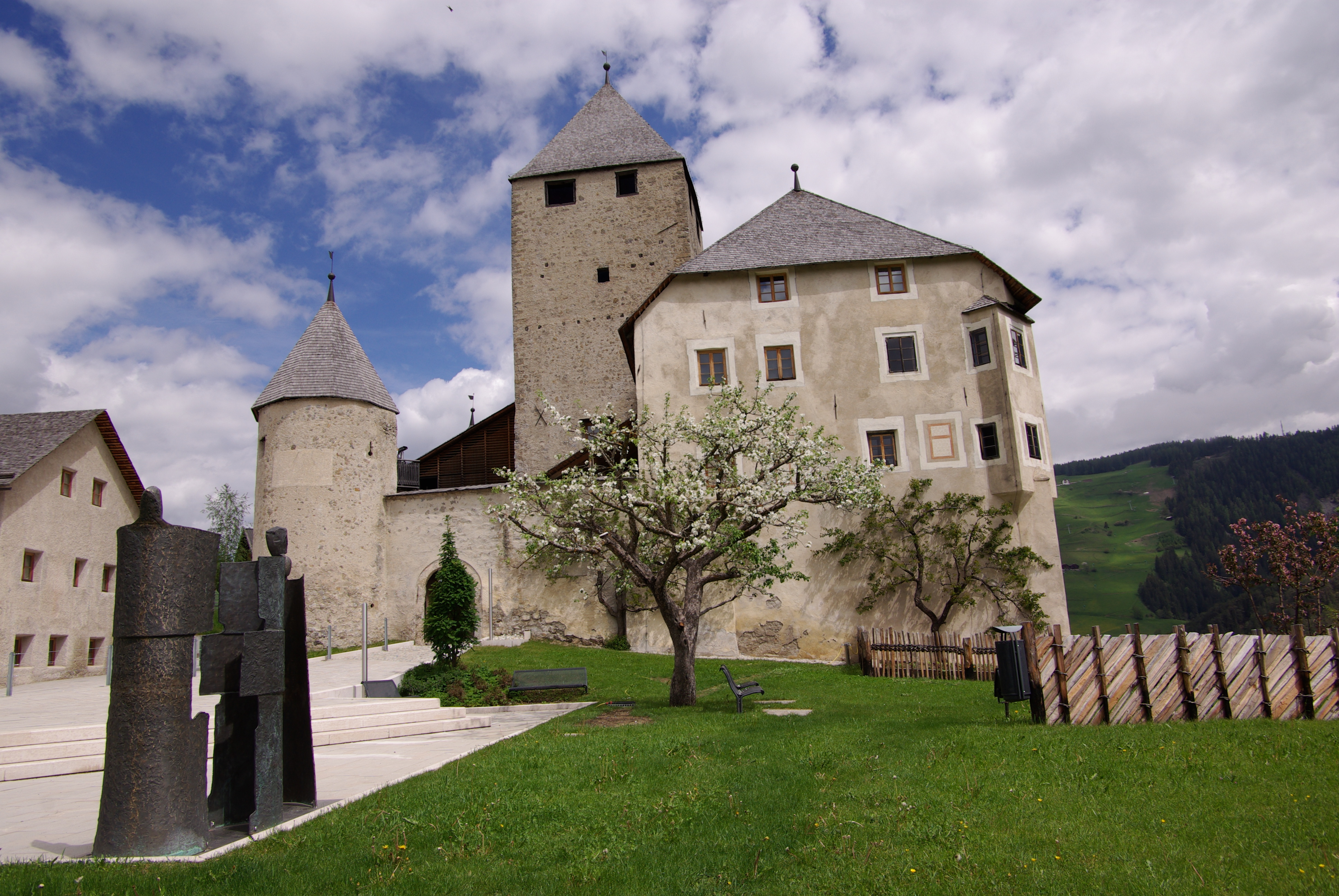
Museum Ladin located in Thurn Castle (Ladin: Ćiastel de Tor)

South Tyrol's museum offerings are wide-ranging. About half of the institutions are privately run, the other half by public bodies or church institutions. The eleven South Tyrolean provincial museums, which are culturally, naturally, and historically oriented, record strong visitor numbers and are in part spread across multiple sites in South Tyrol:

- the South Tyrol Museum of Archaeology, which has the mummy of Ötzi the Iceman
- the Museion, Museum of modern and contemporary art of Bolzano
- the Messner Mountain Museum of Reinhold Messner
- the White Tower (Brixen) museum
- the South Tyrol Mining Museum
- the Eccel Kreuzer Museum
- the Fortress of Franzensfeste
- the South Tyrol Museum of Hunting and Fishing
- the South Tyrol Museum of Culture and Provincial History
- the Museum Ladin
- the South Tyrol Museum of Nature
- the Touriseum with the adjoining gardens of Trauttmansdorff Castle
- the South Tyrol Museum of Folklore
- the South Tyrol Wine Museum

Other institutions with private, church, or mixed sponsorship include, for example, the Messner Mountain Museum initiated by Reinhold Messner on the theme of "mountain," the Diocesan Museum of Brixen with its collection of Christian art from the Middle Ages and modern times, the Pharmacy Museum in Brixen, and the Museion, the Museum of Modern and Contemporary Art in Bozen, which is jointly run by an association and the province.

==== Libraries ====
There are about 280 public libraries in South Tyrol, which are affiliated with many privately run institutions in the South Tyrolean Library Network. Two scholarly libraries stand out in importance and size: the "Dr. Friedrich Teßmann" Provincial Library with its comprehensive Tyrolensia collection, and the library of the Free University of Bozen, which is spread across three locations. Since 1997, the project "Cataloguing Historical Libraries" has been dedicated to indexing South Tyrol's historical holdings.

==== Research institutions ====
The most important research institutions in South Tyrol are located at the Free University of Bozen and at Eurac Research. The university is mainly engaged in research within its faculties, i.e. economics, computer science, natural sciences, engineering, and education. The eleven institutes of Eurac Research, founded in 1992, work in an interdisciplinary way on the topics of autonomy, health, mountains, and technologies.

The Laimburg Research Centre is tasked with practice-oriented agricultural research. An Italian subsidiary of the Fraunhofer Society, founded in 2009, is based in the NOI Techpark in Bolzano. Historical source research is carried out, among others, by the South Tyrol Provincial Archives, the State Archives of Bolzano, and the City Archives of Bolzano. Further research facilities exist at the South Tyrolean Provincial Museums, such as the Centre for Regional History.

=== Music ===
The Bozner Bergsteigerlied and the Andreas-Hofer-Lied are considered to be the unofficial anthems of South Tyrol.

The folk musical group Kastelruther Spatzen from Kastelruth and the rock band Frei.Wild from Brixen have received high recognition in the German-speaking part of the world.

Award-winning electronic music producer Giorgio Moroder was born and raised in South Tyrol in a mixed Italian, German and Ladin-speaking environment.

=== Cuisine ===
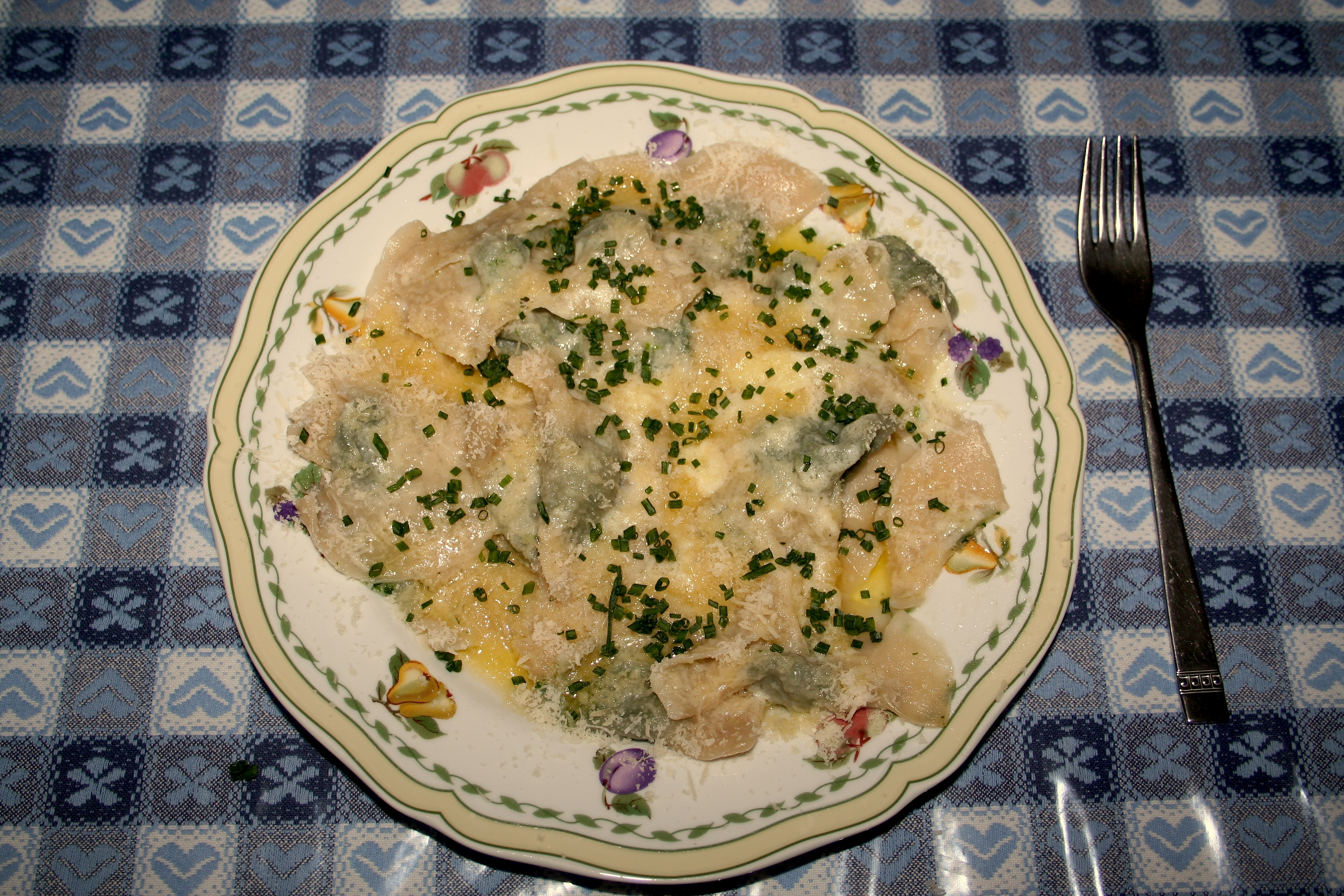
South Tyrolean schlutzkrapfen

Among the traditional dishes and foodstuffs of South Tyrol's rural, grain-based cuisine were once wheat and oat porridge, later also polenta, as well as spelt and rye bread (for example Vinschgauer or Schüttelbrot). Commonly cultivated vegetables included cabbage, turnips, potatoes, and green beans. Due to widespread livestock farming, dairy products were available in abundance. Pork lard was primarily used as cooking fat. Meat was typically processed into smoked products (such as Speck or Kaminwurzen).

With the rise of tourism in the 1960s and 1970s, regional cuisine experienced a revival, for instance through the rapidly popularized tradition of Törggelen or the somewhat later "Specialties Weeks," which sought to introduce tourists to local delicacies. In this process, traditional Tyrolean fare was adapted to modern preparation and processing techniques, and shaped by the influence of Italian cuisine to suit contemporary tastes. In gastronomy, roughly one-third of the offerings come from local cuisine, one-third from Italian cuisine, and one-third from the standard repertoire of international cuisine.

Typical South Tyrolean dishes include dumplings (Knödel), barley soup, schlutzkrapfen, strauben, tirteln, and cold-cut platters, which are often enjoyed with South Tyrolean wine as a Marende (traditional afternoon snack).

=== Sports ===
South Tyroleans have been successful at winter sports and they regularly form a large part of Italy's contingent at the Winter Olympics: in the last edition (2022), South Tyroleans won 3 out of the 17 Italian medals, all three bronzes (of which two won by German-speaking South Tyroleans). Famed mountain climber Reinhold Messner, the first climber to climb Mount Everest without the use of oxygen tanks, was born and raised in the region. Other successful South Tyroleans include luger Armin Zöggeler, figure skater Carolina Kostner, skier Isolde Kostner, luge and bobsleigh medallist Gerda Weissensteiner, tennis players Andreas Seppi and Jannik Sinner, and former team principal of Haas F1 Team in the FIA Formula One World Championship Guenther Steiner.

HC Interspar Bolzano-Bozen Foxes are one of Italy's most successful ice hockey teams, while the most important football club in South Tyrol is FC Südtirol, which won its first-ever promotion to Serie B in 2022.

The province is famous worldwide for its mountain climbing opportunities, while in winter it is home to a number of popular ski resorts including Val Gardena, Alta Badia and Seiser Alm.

== Economy ==
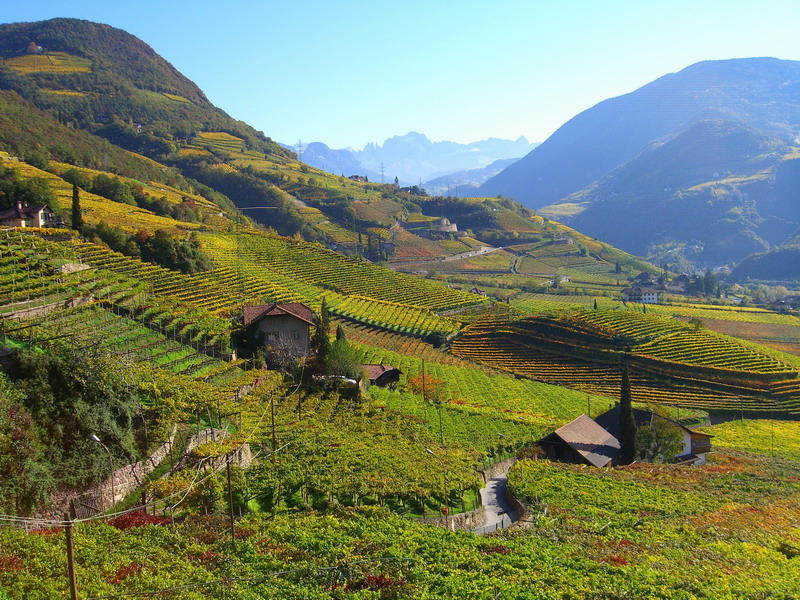
Vineyards of St. Magdalena in Bolzano with St. Justina and Rosengarten group in the background

In 2023 South Tyrol had a GDP per capita of €62,100, making it the richest province in Italy and one of the richest in the European Union.

The unemployment level in 2007 was roughly 2.4% (2.0% for men and 3.0% for women). Residents are employed in a variety of sectors, from agriculture — the province is a large producer of apples, and its South Tyrol wine are also renowned — to industry to services, especially tourism. Spas located on the Italian Alps have become a favorite for tourists seeking wellness.

South Tyrol is home to numerous mechanical engineering companies, some of which are the global market leaders in their sectors: the Leitner Group that specializes in cable cars and wind energy, TechnoAlpin AG, which is the global market leader in snow-making technology and the snow groomer company Prinoth.

The unemployment rate stood at 2% in 2024.

== Infrastructure ==
=== Transport ===
==== Road transport ====
License plate of South Tyrol (Bz)

South Tyrol has a well-developed road network over 5,000 km in length. The most important transport infrastructure is the toll-based Brenner Motorway (A22), also called the Autostrada del Brennero, part of the European Route E45. It also connects to the Brenner Autobahn in Austria. It runs through the region in a north–south direction from the Brenner Pass (1,370 m) past Brixen and Bolzano to the Salurner Klause (207 m). The Brenner is the Alpine pass with the highest volume of freight traffic. In 2023, an average of 25,440 cars and 13,187 trucks traveled on the A22 each day. The region is, together with northern and eastern Tyrol, an important transit point between southern Germany and Northern Italy. The vehicle registration plate of South Tyrol is the two-letter provincial code Bz for the capital city, Bolzano. Along with the autonomous Trentino (Tn) and Aosta Valley (Ao), South Tyrol is allowed to surmount its license plates with its coat of arms.

The key towns, valleys, and passes of South Tyrol are connected by state and provincial roads, which since 1998 have been exclusively maintained and financed by the South Tyrolean provincial administration. In addition, there are numerous municipal roads. The busiest roads are the major state roads, particularly in the more densely populated areas. On the SS 38 serving the west of the region, which between Merano and Bolzano has been expanded into a four-lane expressway known as the MeBo, more than 41,000 daily journeys were recorded around Bolzano in 2024. The SS 42, which connects Bolzano with the Überetsch area, registered more than 24,000 daily journeys, the SS 12 ("Brenner State Road") running parallel to the motorway at the entrance to the Eisack Valley had more than 20,000, and the SS 49 in the Puster Valley recorded more than 21,000 on some sections.

The mountainous terrain of South Tyrol requires a large number of complex engineering structures. On state and provincial roads alone, there are about 1,700 bridges and 208 tunnels. Mountain passes accessible to general motor traffic are particularly maintenance-intensive. Seven of these pass roads rise above 2,000 m in elevation, namely the Stelvio Pass (2,757 m), Timmelsjoch (2,474 m), Sella Pass (2,218 m), Penser Joch (2,211 m), Gardena Pass (2,121 m), Jaufen Pass (2,094 m), and Staller Sattel (2,052 m).

==== Rail transport ====
The South Tyrolean rail network covers about 300 km of track. It is partly operated by Rete Ferroviaria Italiana and partly by South Tyrolean Transport Structures.

The Brenner Railway, part of the Berlin–Palermo axis, connects Innsbruck via Bolzano and Trento with Verona, crossing the region in a north–south direction. The Brenner Base Tunnel (BBT), currently under construction and expected to open in 2032, will run beneath the Brenner Pass, shifting much of the freight transit from road to rail. With a planned length of 55 kilometres (34 mi), this tunnel will increase freight train average speed to 120 kilometres per hour (75 mph) and reduce transit time by over an hour. Western South Tyrol is served by the Bolzano–Merano line and the Vinschgau Railway, while the Puster Valley Railway links Franzensfeste with Innichen and further connects to the Drava Valley Railway in Austrian East Tyrol. In addition, there are several smaller railways of primarily tourist significance, such as the Ritten Railway and the Mendel funicular. Some branch lines, including the Überetsch Railway and Taufers Railway, were closed between 1950 and 1971 with the rise of automobile traffic. Larger cities used to have their own tramway system, such as the Meran Tramway and Bolzano Tramway. These were replaced after the Second World War with buses. Many other cities and municipalities have their own bus system or are connected with each other by it.

Long-distance domestic and international passenger services operate in South Tyrol only on the Brenner Railway. Cross-border regional passenger services exist on both the Brenner and Puster Valley railways. Freight traffic is also carried exclusively on the Brenner Railway, with around 11.7 million tonnes of goods transported in 2013.

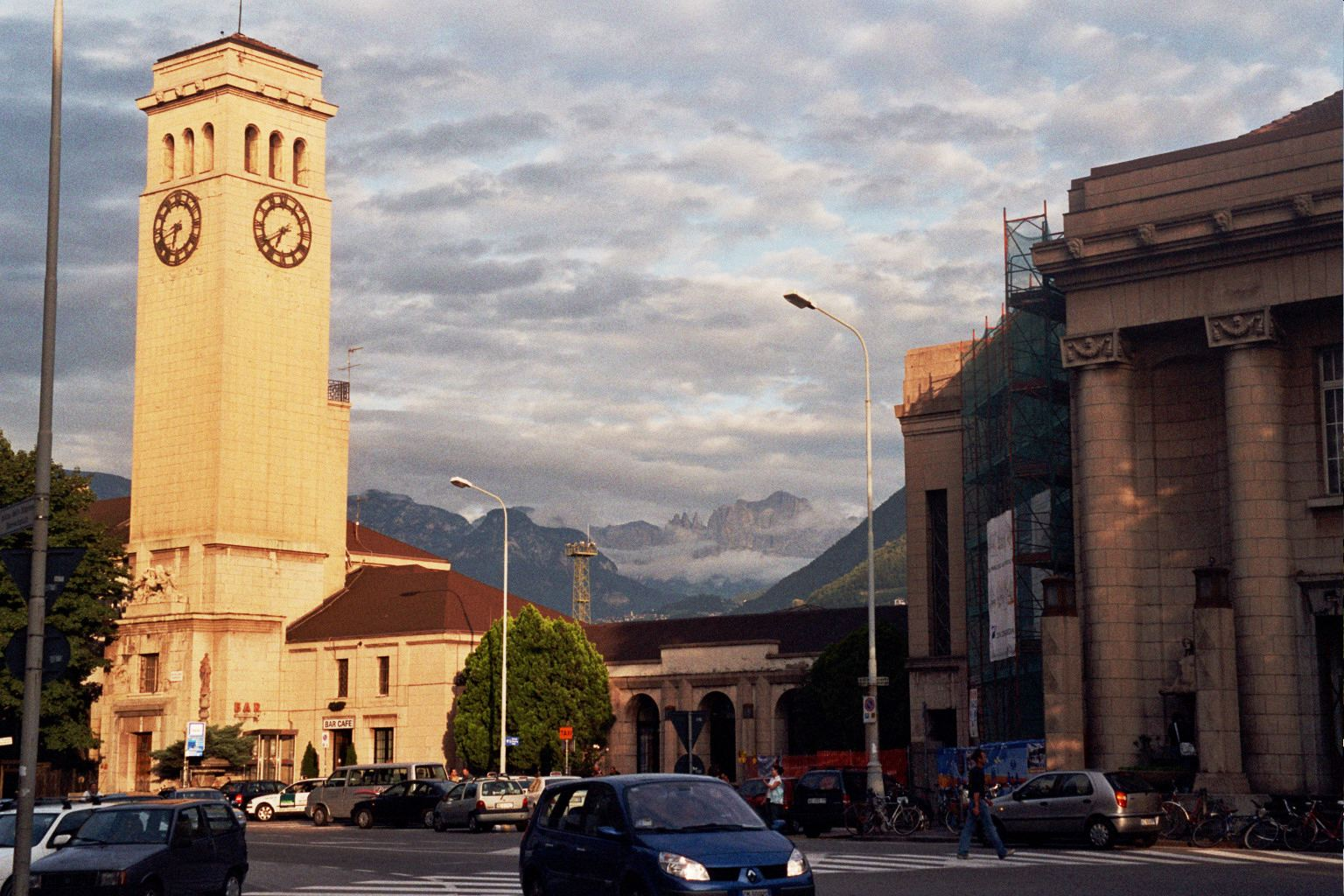
Bolzano station

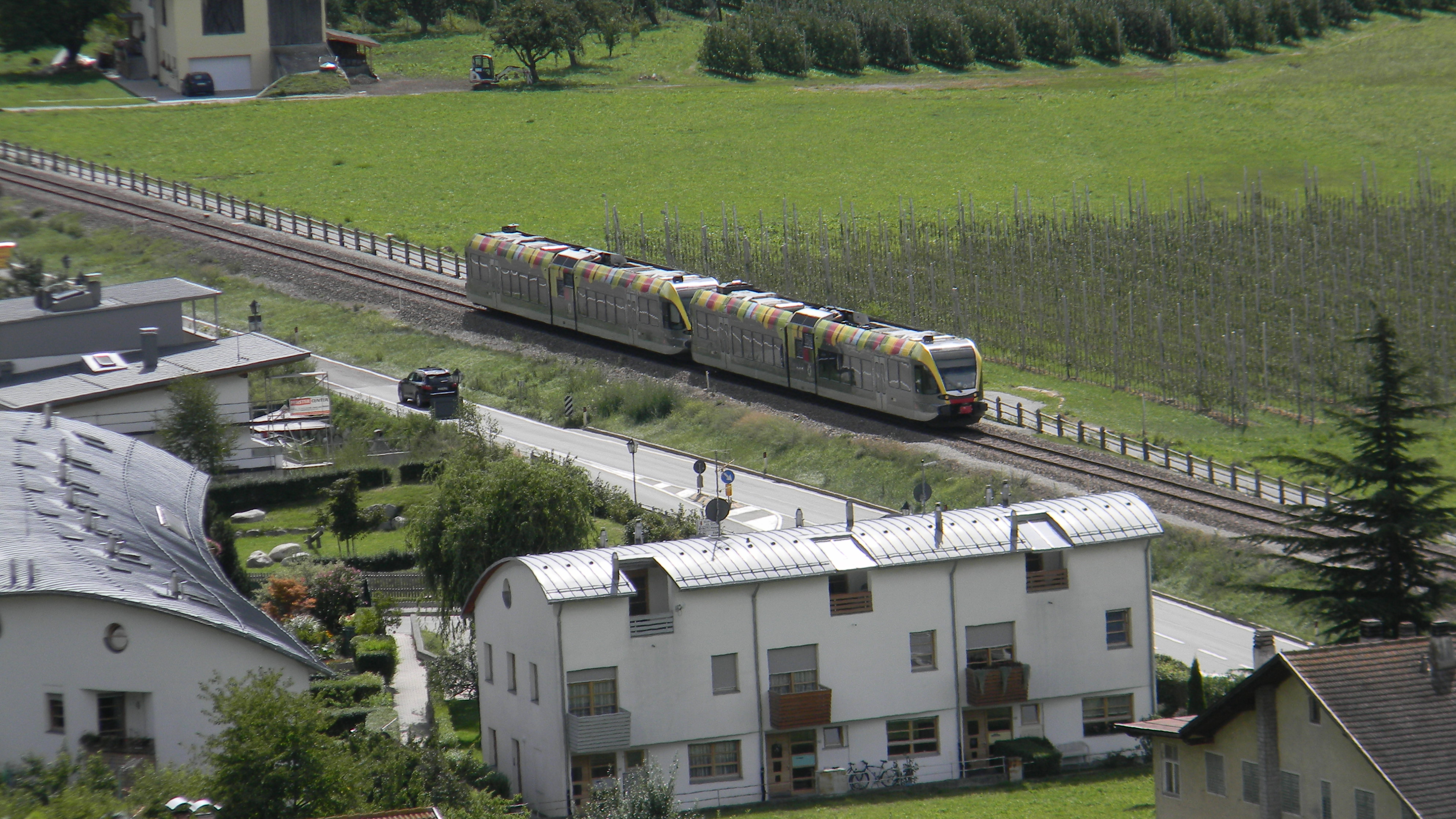
Vinschgau Railway train near Schluderns-Sluderno

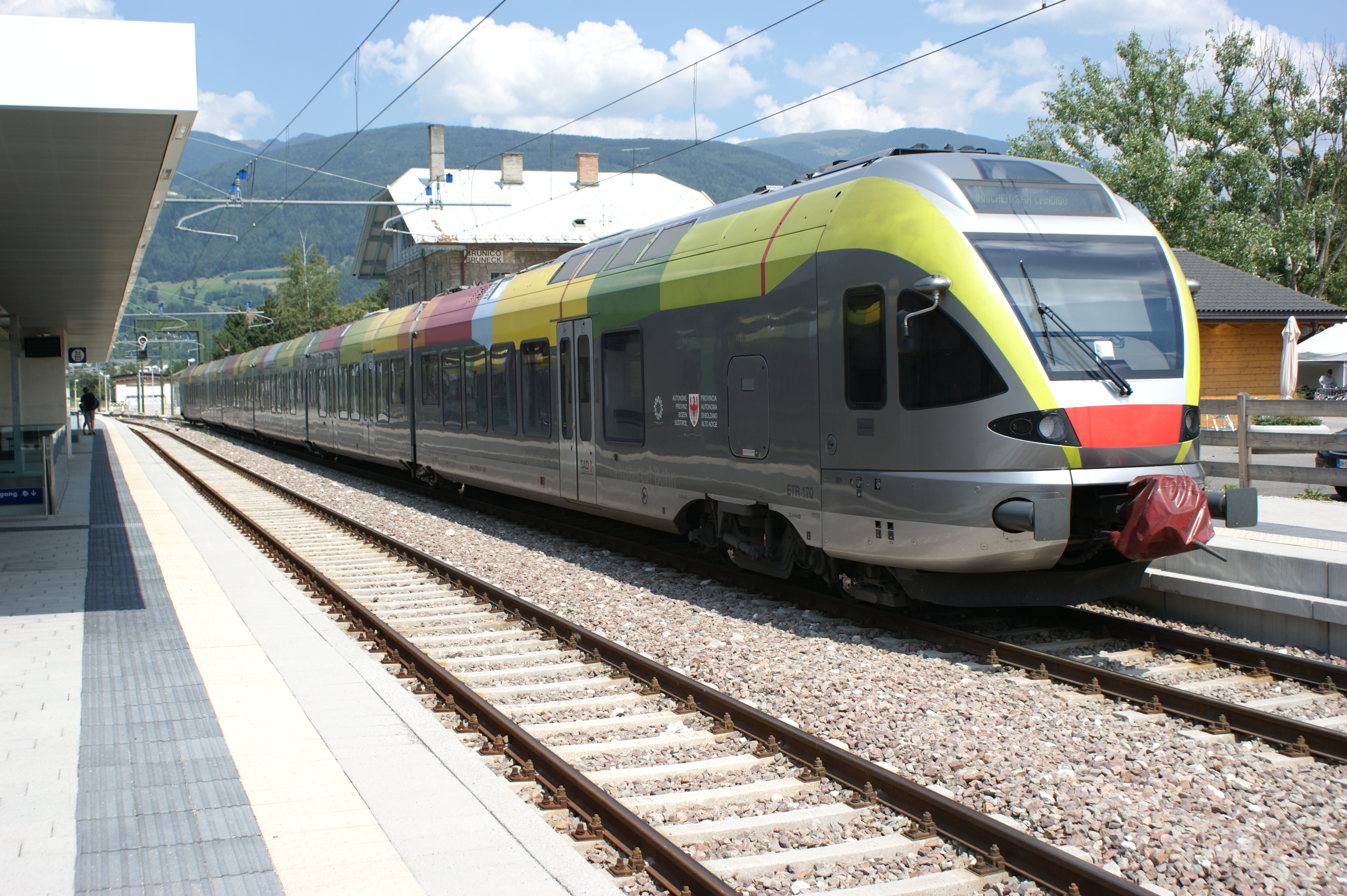
Pustertal Railway at Bruneck station

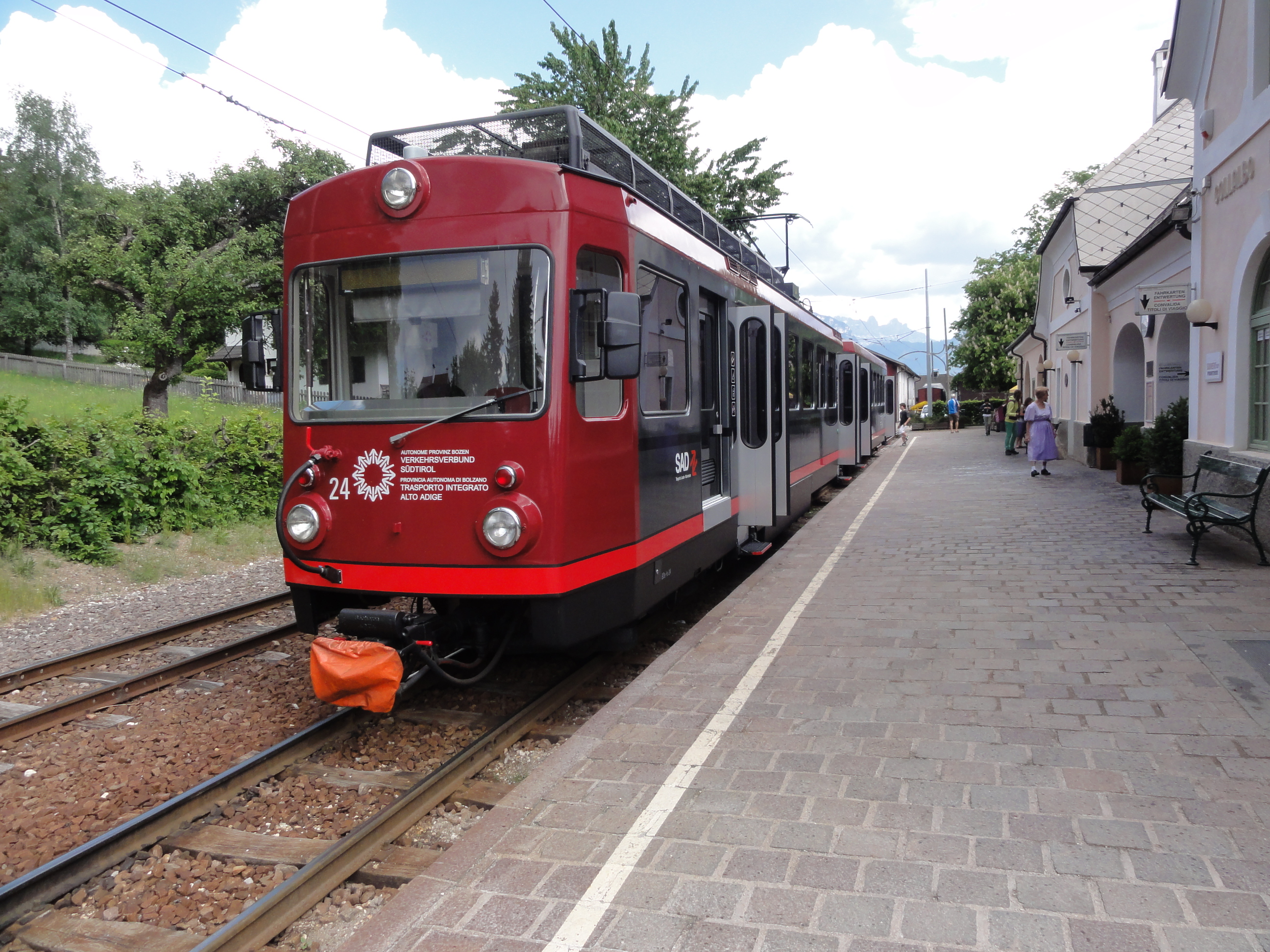
Rittner Railway at Klobenstein station

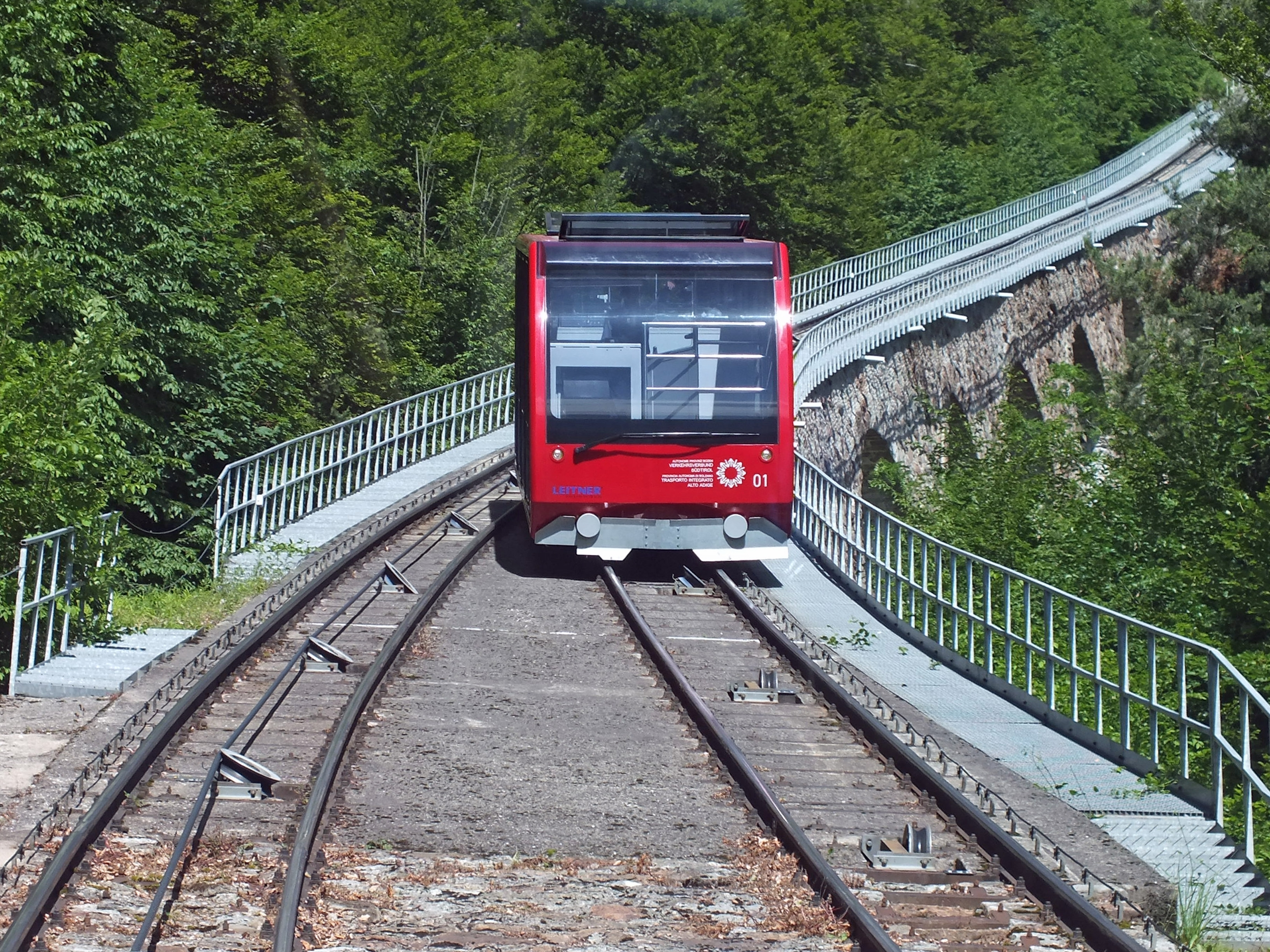
Mendel Railway

==== Bicycle, cableway, and air transport ====
The inter-municipal cycling network has been steadily expanded for years and now covers more than 500 km. The three main cycling routes through the region's major valleys—Route 1 "Brenner–Salurn," Route 2 "Vinschgau–Bolzano," and Route 3 "Puster Valley"—are almost entirely continuous. Within Bolzano alone, the cycling network includes about 50 km of designated paths, accounting for around 30% of urban trips.

In 2024, South Tyrol had 354 cable car installations. Most serve winter sports areas, though some are also used for public transport. More than half of the installations were built after 2000.

Bolzano Airport is used for scheduled flights, charter flights, general aviation, and military purposes. There is also Toblach Airfield, which is primarily military but also partly open to private users.

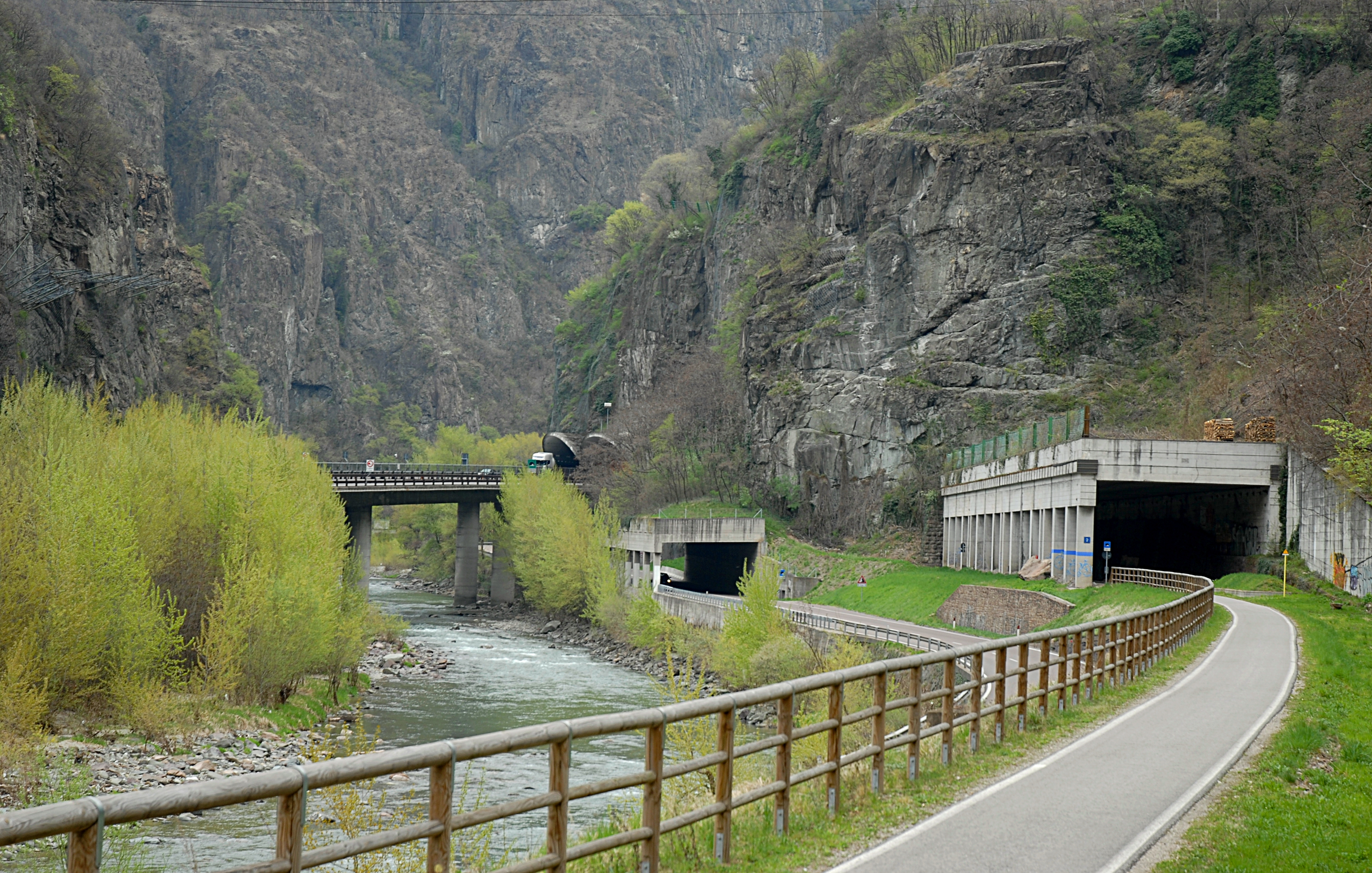
Cycle route 1, SS 12 and A22 between Kardaun and Blumau

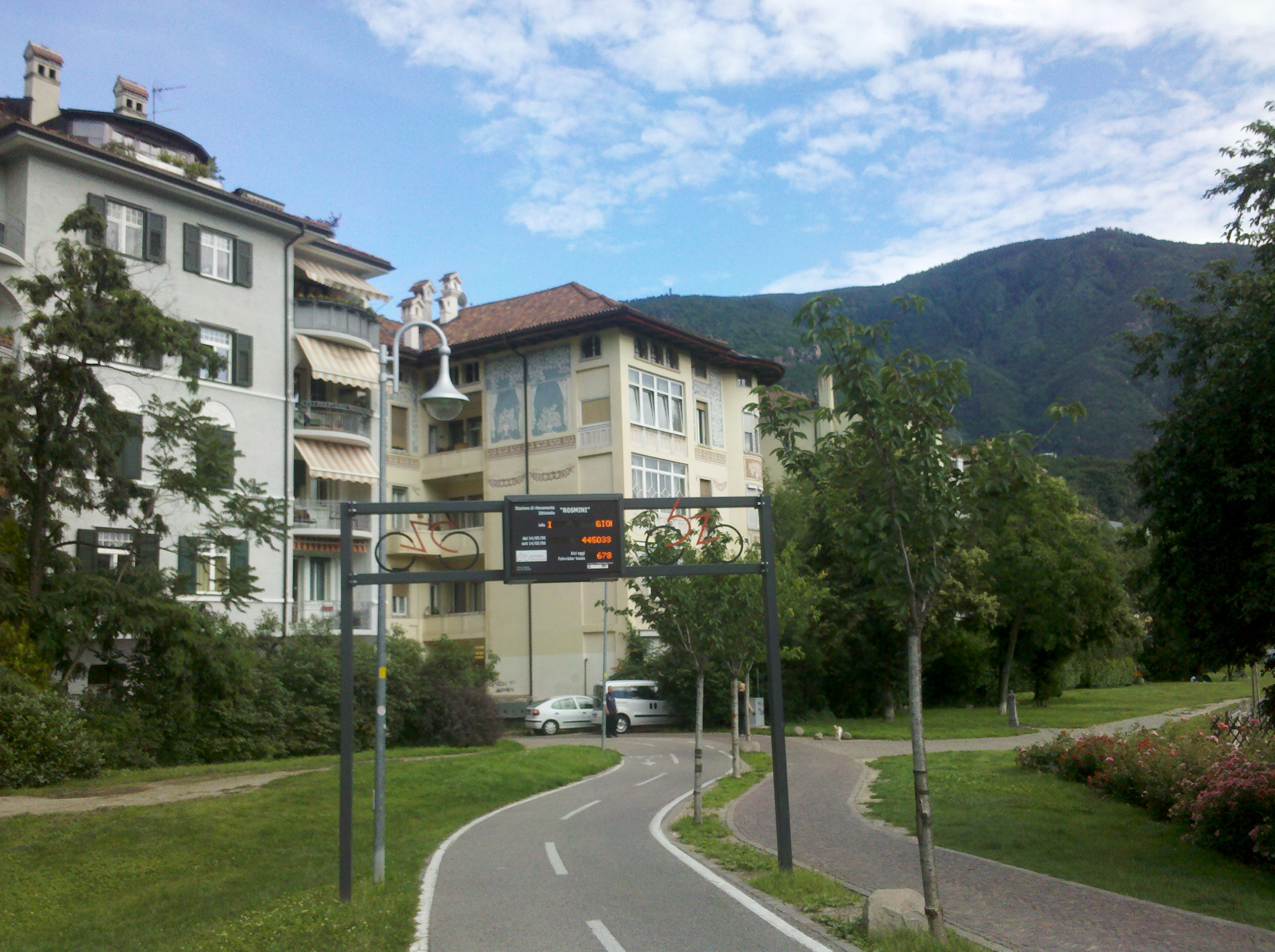
Cycle path in Bolzano

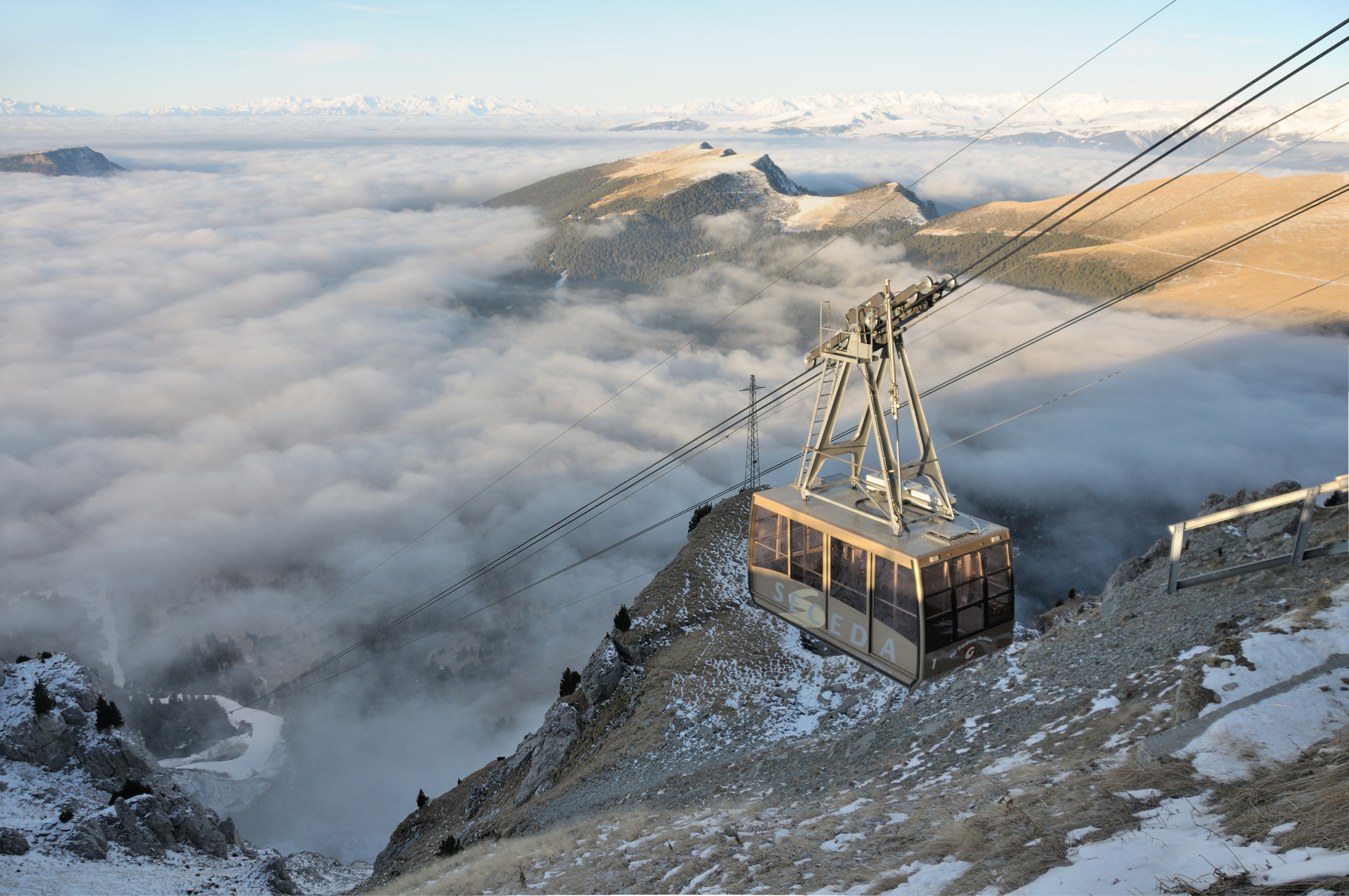
Cable car on Mount Seceda in the Dolomites

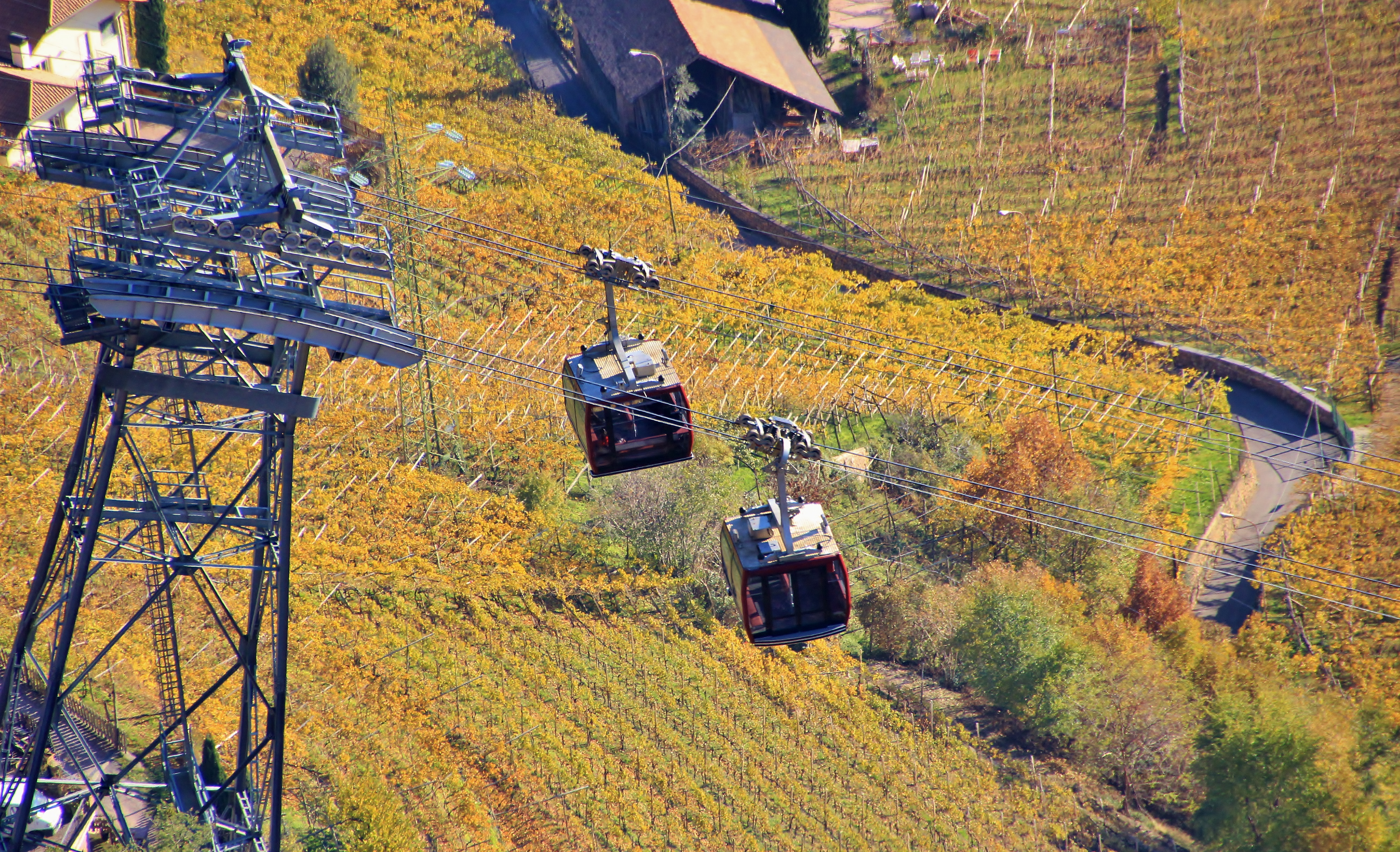
Rittner cable car

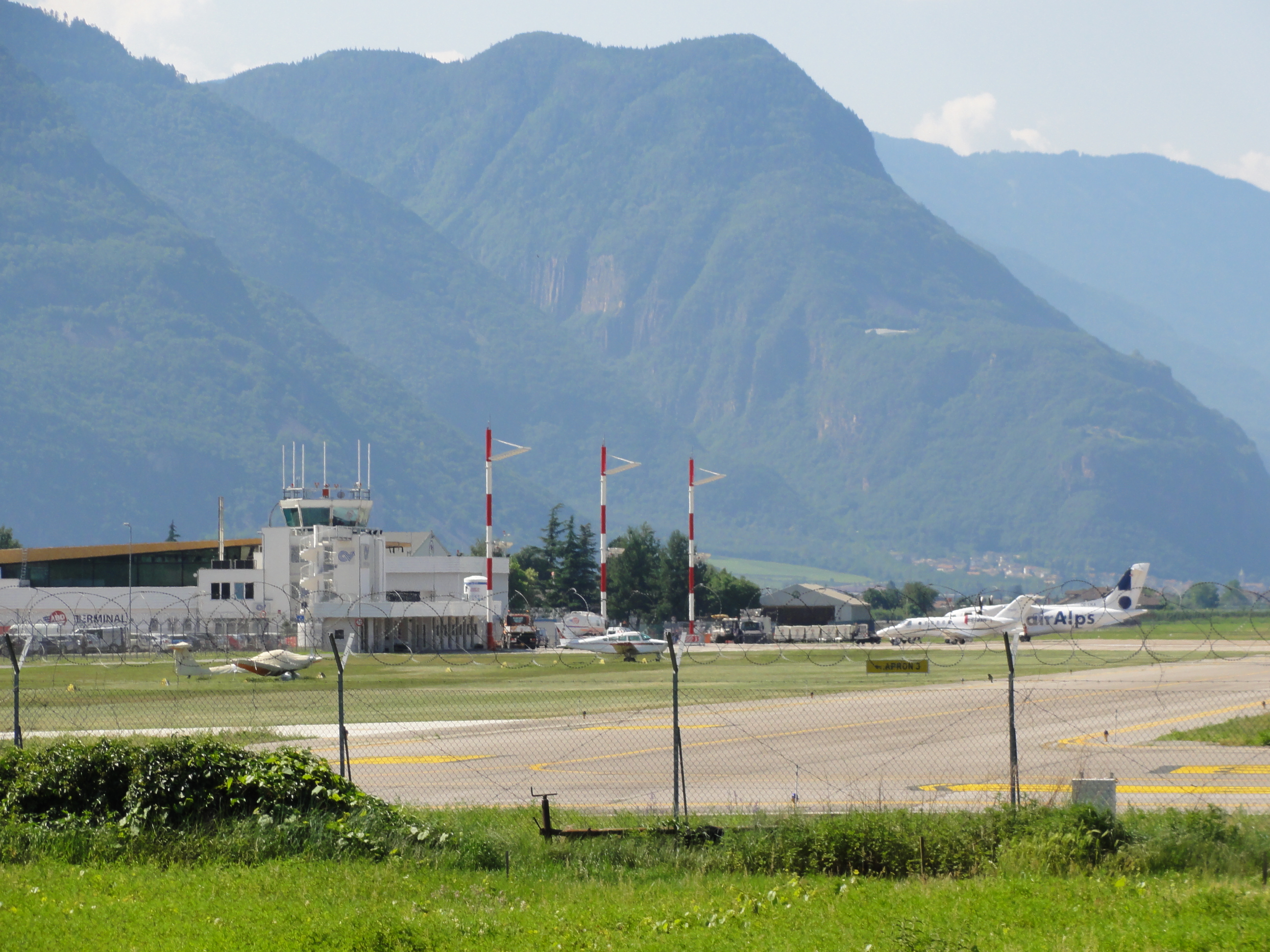
Bolzano Airport

==== Public transport ====
All public transport in South Tyrol is integrated into the Verkehrsverbund Südtirol (South Tyrol Integrated Transport System). More than half of South Tyroleans have a South Tyrol Pass (Südtirol Pass), which allows contactless validation and travel on all network services. These include intercity and urban buses (such as SASA), regional trains operated by SAD and Trenitalia, the Mendel and Ritten railways, and cable cars to Kohlern, Meransen, Mölten, Ritten, and Vöran.

During the 2000s, the province of South Tyrol significantly expanded and improved the frequency of bus and train services. With the gradual introduction of the so-called South Tyrol Takt (timetable system), half-hourly or hourly services were established on the main routes, with denser services at peak times and improved coordination between bus and rail.

=== Healthcare ===
The publicly funded facilities of the healthcare system are centrally managed and coordinated by the South Tyrolean Health Authority (Südtiroler Sanitätsbetrieb). The authority includes seven hospitals: the central hospital in Bolzano, the major hospitals in Brixen, Bruneck, and Meran, as well as the basic care hospitals in Innichen (belonging to the Bruneck health district), Schlanders (belonging to the Meran health district), and Sterzing (belonging to the Brixen health district). In addition, South Tyrol is divided into a number of smaller health districts (Gesundheitssprengel) with local clinics that provide services in prevention, diagnostics, therapy, rehabilitation, and counseling. The health authority represents by far the largest item in South Tyrol's regional budget: in 2024, it accounted for €1.57 billion.

In addition to the public hospitals, there are also several accredited private clinics in Bolzano, Meran, and Brixen.

=== Social services ===
The main public providers of social services in South Tyrol are the district communities (Bezirksgemeinschaften), which have taken over this area of responsibility from the municipalities. Most social services—including financial assistance, home care, basic socio-educational support, and citizen services—are provided by the social districts (Sozialsprengel) distributed throughout the region, whose offices coincide with those of the health districts. However, some services are provided across districts for organizational reasons.

An important element of social policy is the South Tyrolean Housing Institute (Wohnbauinstitut, WOBI), founded in 1972 immediately after the adoption of the Second Statute of Autonomy. This public-law body is responsible for building and renting housing for low-income and middle-class families, elderly people, people with disabilities, as well as for providing dormitories for workers and students. In 2015, WOBI managed 13,000 apartments in 112 municipalities.

Among the non-governmental providers of social services in South Tyrol are, among others, church organizations such as Caritas, associations such as the St. Vincent Society (Vinzenzgemeinschaft) and Lebenshilfe, as well as a variety of social cooperatives.

== Media ==
=== Newspapers and magazines ===
The oldest and most widely circulated daily newspaper is Dolomiten, published in German and to a lesser extent in Ladin, followed by the Italian-language Alto Adige. Since their founding in 1945, both newspapers have represented the leading media of the German- and Italian-speaking subcultures of South Tyrol, consistently taking opposing positions. In 2016, South Tyrol's largest publishing house, Athesia – publisher of Dolomiten – acquired a majority stake in Alto Adige, which until then had always been under Italian ownership.

Of lesser importance in the press landscape are the local edition of Corriere della Sera (Corriere dell'Alto Adige), which emerged from the former daily Il Mattino dell'Alto Adige, as well as the German-language Neue Südtiroler Tageszeitung. Athesia also publishes the German-language Sunday newspaper Zett.

Significant regional weekly papers include the political magazine ff, the church newspapers Katholisches Sonntagsblatt and Il Segno, and the Südtiroler Wirtschaftszeitung. The ff-Media publishing house also produces the business magazine Südtirol Panorama. The Union Generela di Ladins – umbrella organization of Ladin associations – publishes a weekly newspaper in Ladin, La Usc di Ladins ("The Voice of the Ladins"), whose texts are written in the local variety of the valley being covered.

Among scholarly publications are the regional history journals Der Schlern and Geschichte und Region/Storia e regione, the Ladinist yearbook Ladinia, and the botanical-zoological journal Gredleriana. Arunda is South Tyrol's best-known cultural magazine.

=== Book publishing ===
In the book publishing sector, alongside the traditionally dominant Athesia publishing house and the much smaller Weger Verlag, several German-language competitors emerged from the 1990s onwards, such as Edition Raetia, Folio Verlag, and Provinz Verlag, some of which operate beyond the region. The Austrian Studienverlag also maintains a branch in Bolzano. The Italian-language regional book sector of South Tyrol is mainly served by the publishers Praxis 3 and Alpha Beta. Since the early 2000s, some publishing houses have increasingly developed bilingual programs (see also Tirolensien).

=== Radio ===
The logo of Rundfunk Anstalt Südtirol – South Tyrolean public broadcasting company

Among radio broadcasters, special mention goes to the public-service Rai – Radiotelevisione Italiana, which maintains three editorially independent departments at its Bolzano studios. Rai Südtirol broadcasts a full German-language program on its own radio channel. On the same frequency, Ladin-language programs produced by Rai Ladinia are aired as a window program. Rai Alto Adige produces Italian-language regional broadcasts, which are transmitted via Rai Radio 1 or Rai Radio 2.

South Tyrol also has numerous local radio stations in all official languages, including the German-language Radio 2000, Radio Grüne Welle, Radio Holiday, Radio Tirol, and Südtirol 1, as well as the Ladin-language Radio Gherdëina Dolomites. The most listened-to news broadcast is the Südtirol Journal, aired by several private stations.

Via the DAB+ standard, the South Tyrolean Broadcasting Corporation (RAS) distributes the following stations in two region-wide ensembles: Rai Radio 1, Rai Radio 2, Rai Radio 3, Rai Südtirol, Bayern 1, Bayern 2, Bayern 3, BR-Klassik, BR Heimat, BR24, Deutschlandfunk Kultur, Deutschlandfunk Nova, Die Maus, Radio Swiss Pop, Radio Swiss Classic, Radio Swiss Jazz, Radiotelevisiun Svizra Rumantscha, Rete Due, Ö1, Radio Tirol, Ö3, and FM4. Additional ensembles (DABMedia, Club DAB Italia, Eurodab) carry private South Tyrolean and Italian radio stations.

=== Television ===
The most important television broadcasters from a South Tyrolean perspective are Rai – Radiotelevisione Italiana and Österreichischer Rundfunk (ORF). At its Bolzano studios, Rai operates three independent editorial departments. Rai Südtirol airs German-language TV programming, including the daily-produced Tagesschau, on its own channel. On the same channel, Rai Ladinia provides Ladin-language programming, including the news program TRaiL. Rai Alto Adige supplies Rai 3 with Italian-language regional content. ORF maintains a branch of its Tyrol regional studio in Bolzano, where the regional news show Südtirol heute is produced.

The South Tyrolean Broadcasting Corporation (RAS) transmits via DVB-T the Austrian channels ORF 1, ORF 2, ORF III and ORF SPORT +, the German channels Das Erste, ZDF, ZDFneo, 3sat, BR Fernsehen, KiKA, and arte, as well as the Swiss channels SRF 1, SRF zwei, and RSI LA 1. Separately, the Italian public-service TV channels (Rai 1, Rai 2, Rai 3, Rai News 24, Rai Südtirol/Ladinia) and private Italian channels (notably Mediaset programs and La7) are available.

=== News websites ===
Online media play an increasingly important role in regional reporting. The most visited news website is Südtirol Online (stol.it), online since 1997 and, like Südtirol News (suedtirolnews.it), operated by the Athesia Group. The Neue Südtiroler Tageszeitung (tageszeitung.it), Alto Adige (altoadige.it), and Rai Südtirol (rai.it/tagesschau) also maintain online portals. Purely digital newspapers without print editions include salto.bz, which publishes both editorial content and user-generated articles, and unsertirol24.com.

== See also ==
- Tyrol
- Trentino-Alto Adige/Südtirol
- Ladin language

== Bibliography ==
- (in German) Gottfried Solderer (ed.) (1999–2004). Das 20. Jahrhundert in Südtirol. 6 Vol., Bozen: Raetia Verlag. ISBN 978-88-7283-137-3.
- Antony E. Alcock (2003). The History of the South Tyrol Question. London: Michael Joseph. 535 pp.
- Rolf Steininger (2003). South Tyrol: A Minority Conflict of the Twentieth Century. New Brunswick, New Jersey: Transaction Publishers. ISBN 978-0-7658-0800-4.
- Georg Grote (2012). The South Tyrol Question 1866–2010. From National Rage to Regional State. Oxford: Peter Lang. ISBN 978-3-03911-336-1.
- Georg Grote, Hannes Obermair (2017). A Land on the Threshold. South Tyrolean Transformations, 1915–2015. Oxford/Bern/New York: Peter Lang. ISBN 978-3-0343-2240-9.
