= List of Italian film directors =

The following is a list of film directors from Italy.

== A ==
- Giuseppe Adami
- Antonio Albanese
- Marcello Albani
- Giorgio Albertazzi
- Adalberto Albertini
- Filoteo Alberini
- Goffredo Alessandrini
- Ottavio Alessi
- Mario Almirante
- Silvio Amadio
- Giuseppe Amato
- Arturo Ambrosio
- Gianni Amelio
- Mario Amendola
- Tony Amendola
- Roberto Amoroso
- Franco Amurri
- Roberto Andò
- Raffaele Andreassi
- Marcello Andrei
- Alfredo Angeli
- Edoardo Anton
- Michelangelo Antonioni
- Renzo Arbore
- Francesca Archibugi
- Asia Argento
- Dario Argento
- Lello Arena
- Ovidio Gabriele Assonitis
- Antonio Attanasio
- Pupi Avati

== B ==
- Gianfranco Baldanello
- Ferdinando Baldi
- Gian Vittorio Baldi
- Marcello Baldi
- Piero Ballerini
- Luca Barbareschi
- Umberto Barbaro
- Enzo Barboni
- Francesco Barilli
- Carlo Barsotti
- Elio Bartolini
- Andrea Barzini
- Maria Basaglia
- Giulio Base
- Franco Battiato
- Giacomo Battiato
- Luigi Batzella
- Lamberto Bava
- Mario Bava
- Camillo Bazzoni
- Luigi Bazzoni
- Marco Bechis
- Ila Bêka
- Marco Bellocchio
- Carmelo Bene
- Roberto Benigni
- Giuseppe Bennati
- Stefano Benni
- Alessandro Benvenuti
- Paolo Benvenuti
- Sergio Bergonzelli
- Giuliana Berlinguer
- Franco Bernini
- Giulio Berruti
- Bernardo Bertolucci
- Giuseppe Bertolucci
- Alberto Bevilacqua
- Phaim Bhuyian
- Giuliano Biagetti
- Enzo Biagi
- Adelchi Bianchi
- Andrea Bianchi
- Giorgio Bianchi
- Roberto Bianchi Montero
- Paolo Bianchini
- Ferruccio Biancini
- Oreste Biancoli
- Antonio Bido
- Gianni Bisiach
- Alessandro Blasetti
- Silverio Blasi
- Tanio Boccia
- Sandro Bolchi
- Mauro Bolognini
- Adriano Bolzoni
- Enrico Bomba
- Gianni Bongioanni
- Claudio Bonivento
- Mario Bonnard
- Alberto Bonucci
- Carlo Borghesio
- Ruth Borgobello
- Cristiano Bortone
- Franco Bottari
- Bruno Bozzetto
- Anton Giulio Bragaglia
- Carlo Ludovico Bragaglia
- Tinto Brass
- Rossano Brazzi
- Mario Brenta
- Alfonso Brescia
- Enrico Brignano
- Guido Brignone
- Edith Bruck
- Franco Brusati
- Ninni Bruschetta
- Aldo Buzzi

== C ==
- Mario Caiano
- Jerry Calà
- Claudio Caligari
- Francesco Calogero
- Mimmo Calopresti
- Alfio Caltabiano
- Flavio Calzavara
- Mario Camerini
- Giacomo Campiotti
- Carlo Campogalliani
- Cesare Canevari
- Giorgio Capitani
- Alessandro Capone
- Vittorio Caprioli
- Antonio Capuano
- Luigi Capuano
- Alberto Cardone
- Carlo Carlei
- Giuliano Carnimeo
- Fabio Carpi
- Pier Carpi
- Jonas Carpignano
- Donato Carrisi
- Mario Caserini
- Stefania Casini
- Riccardo Cassano
- Renato Castellani
- Franco Castellano
- Sergio Castellitto
- Arnaldo Catinari
- Alberto Cavallone
- Liliana Cavani
- Paolo Cavara
- Massimo Ceccherini
- Guido Celano
- Adriano Celentano
- Adolfo Celi
- Fernando Cerchio
- Ferruccio Cerio
- Ennio Cerlesi
- Tonino Cervi
- Piero Chiambretti
- Luigi Chiarini
- Carlo Alberto Chiesa
- Guido Chiesa
- Nando Cicero
- Tano Cimarosa
- Beppe Cino
- Marcello Ciorciolini
- Daniele Ciprì
- Franco Citti
- Sergio Citti
- Osvaldo Civirani
- Giancarlo Cobelli
- Duilio Coletti
- Giuseppe Colizzi
- Cristina Comencini
- Francesca Comencini
- Luigi Comencini
- Jacopo Comin
- Bruno Corbucci
- Sergio Corbucci
- Pappi Corsicato
- Leonardo Cortese
- Mario Costa
- Maurizio Costanzo
- Saverio Costanzo
- Vittorio Cottafavi
- Tizza Covi
- Luigi Cozzi
- Mario Craveri
- Armando Crispino
- Giorgio Cristallini
- Carlo Croccolo

== D ==
- Antonio D'Agostino
- Alessandro D'Alatri
- Angelo D'Alessandro
- Massimo Dallamano
- Renato Dall'Ara
- Enzo D'Alò
- Damiano Damiani
- Luigi Filippo D'Amico
- Daniele D'Anza
- Alberto D'Aversa
- Fabrizio De Angelis
- Andrea De Carlo
- Ennio De Concini
- Luciano De Crescenzo
- Eduardo De Filippo
- Elsa De Giorgi
- Raimondo Del Balzo
- Ubaldo Maria Del Colle
- Giuseppe De Liguoro
- Wladimiro De Liguoro
- Peter Del Monte
- Renato De Maria
- Alberto De Martino
- Leonardo De Mitri
- Ruggero Deodato
- Raffaele De Ritis
- Francesco De Robertis
- Giannetto De Rossi
- Corrado D'Errico
- Giuseppe De Santis
- Vittorio De Seta
- Christian De Sica
- Manuel De Sica
- Vittorio De Sica
- Vittorio De Sisti
- Roberto D'Ettorre Piazzoli
- Enzo Di Gianni
- Fernando Di Leo
- Carlo Di Palma
- Alessandro Di Robilant
- Rino Di Silvestro
- Marco Di Tillo
- Ignazio Dolce
- Gianmarco Donaggio
- Carlo Duse
- Vittorio Duse

== E ==
- Luciano Emmer
- Luciano Ercoli

== F ==
- Aldo Fabrizi
- Roberto Faenza
- Giovanni Fago
- Dino Falconi
- Ugo Falena
- Corrado Farina
- Felice Farina
- Giuseppe Fatigati
- Massimo Felisatti
- Federico Fellini
- Riccardo Fellini
- Giuseppe Ferlito
- Davide Ferrario
- Marco Ferreri
- Franco Ferrini
- Ignazio Ferronetti
- Giorgio Ferroni
- Alberto Festa
- Pasquale Festa Campanile
- Demofilo Fidani
- Enzo Fiermonte
- Armando Fizzarotti
- Ettore Maria Fizzarotti
- Dario Fo
- Marcello Fondato
- Giovacchino Forzano
- Clemente Fracassi
- Claudio Fragasso
- Gianni Franciolini
- Massimo Franciosa
- Pietro Francisci
- Riccardo Freda
- Lucio Fulci

== G ==
- Daniele Gaglianone
- Giovanna Gagliardo
- Carmine Gallone
- Mario Gariazzo
- Mario Garriba
- Matteo Garrone
- Riccardo Garrone
- Sergio Garrone
- Alessandro Gassman
- Vittorio Gassman
- Ernesto Gastaldi
- Giuseppe Mario Gaudino
- Augusto Genina
- Giacomo Gentilomo
- Pietro Germi
- Clyde Geronimi
- Alfredo Giannetti
- Ettore Giannini
- Gibba
- Marco Tullio Giordana
- Claudio Giorgi
- Attilio Giovannini
- Franco Giraldi
- Enzo Girolami
- Marino Girolami
- Romolo Girolami
- Roberto Girometti
- Valeria Golino
- Claudio Gora
- Enrico Gras
- Ernesto Grassi
- Paolo Grassi
- Emidio Greco
- Ezio Greggio
- Ugo Gregoretti
- Sergio Grieco
- Aldo Grimaldi
- Antonello Grimaldi
- Aurelio Grimaldi
- Gianni Grimaldi
- Luca Guadagnino
- Giovanni Guareschi
- Alfredo Guarini
- Giuseppe Guarino
- Enrico Guazzoni
- Mino Guerrini
- Guidarino Guidi
- Gabriel Cash

== H ==
- Paolo Heusch
- Terence Hill

== I ==
- Angelo Iacono
- Ivo Illuminati
- Mario Imperoli
- Stefano Incerti
- Franco Indovina
- Alex Infascelli
- Carlo Infascelli
- Fiorella Infascelli
- Ciccio Ingrassia
- Ciro Ippolito
- Simona Izzo

== J ==
- Gualtiero Jacopetti
- Valerio Jalongo

== L ==
- Wilma Labate
- Aldo Lado
- Mario Landi
- Mario Lanfranchi
- Alberto Lattuada
- Francesco Laudadio
- Mariano Laurenti
- Gabriele Lavia
- Gianfrancesco Lazotti
- Gavino Ledda
- Umberto Lenzi
- Luca Luongo
- Sergio Leone
- Roberto Leoni
- Antonio Leonviola
- Marco Leto
- Enzo Liberti
- Luciano Ligabue
- Piero Livi
- Carlo Lizzani
- Franco Lo Cascio
- Giovanni Lombardo Radice
- Leo Longanesi
- Nanni Loy
- Daniele Luchetti
- Maurizio Lucidi
- Michele Lupo

== M ==
- Mauro Macario
- Ruggero Maccari
- Giulio Macchi
- Luigi Magni
- Antonio Maria Magro
- Anton Giulio Majano
- Curzio Malaparte
- Nunzio Malasomma
- Guido Malatesta
- Luigi Malerba
- Luca Manfredi
- Nino Manfredi
- Giulio Manfredonia
- Nicola Manzari
- Dacia Maraini
- Lucio Marcaccini
- Romolo Marcellini
- Siro Marcellini
- Marcello Marchesi
- Franco Maresco
- Antonio Margheriti
- Giorgio Mariuzzo
- Vincenzo Marra
- Renzo Martinelli
- Luciano Martino
- Sergio Martino
- Nino Martoglio
- Mario Martone
- Francesco Maselli
- Aristide Massaccesi
- Francesco Massaro
- Stelvio Massi
- Camillo Mastrocinque
- Antonello Matarazzo
- Raffaello Matarazzo
- Gianluca Matarrese
- Bruno Mattei
- Mario Mattòli
- Roberto Mauri
- Carlo Mazzacurati
- Lorenza Mazzetti
- Massimo Mazzucco
- Leo Menardi
- Pino Mercanti
- Raffaele Mertes
- Vittorio Metz
- Ivo Barnabò Micheli
- Riccardo Milani
- Gianfranco Mingozzi
- Felice Minotti
- Mario Missiroli
- Federico Moccia
- Giuseppe Moccia
- Domenico Modugno
- Paolo Moffa
- Flavio Mogherini
- Antonio Monda
- Mario Monicelli
- Giuliano Montaldo
- Indro Montanelli
- Luigi Montefiori
- Enzo Monteleone
- Enrico Montesano
- Adriana Monti
- Beni Montresor
- Nanni Moretti
- Mario Morra
- Giorgio Moser
- Gabriele Muccino
- Edoardo Mulargia
- Vincenzo Musolino

== N ==
- Nico Naldini
- Armando Nannuzzi
- Gian Gaspare Napolitano
- Sergio Nasca
- Piero Natoli
- Anna Negri
- Alberto Negrin
- Baldassarre Negroni
- Maurizio Nichetti
- Giancarlo Nicotra
- Stanislao Nievo
- Salvatore Nocita
- Nick Nostro
- Elvira Notari
- Francesco Nuti
- Paolo Nuzzi

== O ==
- Luciano Odorisio
- Enrico Oldoini
- Ermanno Olmi
- Oscar Orefici
- Giuseppe Orlandini
- Valentino Orsini
- Ferzan Özpetek

== P ==
- Antonello Padovano
- Marcello Pagliero
- Amleto Palermi
- Giorgio Panariello
- Gianfranco Pannone
- Domenico Paolella
- Matteo Papetti
- Giulio Paradisi
- Neri Parenti
- Gianfranco Parolini
- Francesco Pasinetti
- Pier Paolo Pasolini
- Uberto Pasolini
- Sergio Pastore
- Giovanni Pastrone
- Giuseppe Patroni Griffi
- Livio Pavanelli
- Pier Ludovico Pavoni
- Riccardo Pazzaglia
- Glauco Pellegrini
- Lucio Pellegrini
- Ivo Perilli
- Memè Perlini
- Alfonso Perugini
- Sandro Petraglia
- Elio Petri
- Giulio Petroni
- Franco Piavoli
- Gianfranco Piccioli
- Giuseppe Piccioni
- Leonardo Pieraccioni
- Piero Pierotti
- Antonio Pietrangeli
- Paolo Pietrangeli
- Pier Francesco Pingitore
- Massimo Pirri
- Salvatore Piscicelli
- Nicola Pistoia
- Fabio Pittorru
- Michele Placido
- Ferdinando Maria Poggioli
- Gian Luigi Polidoro
- Leone Pompucci
- Gillo Pontecorvo
- Marco Ponti
- Maurizio Ponzi
- Antonella Ponziani
- Pasquale Pozzessere
- Renato Pozzetto
- Franco Prosperi
- Francesco Prosperi
- Giorgio Prosperi
- Gianni Puccini
- Massimo Pupillo

== Q ==
- Pino Quartullo
- Giulio Questi
- Folco Quilici

== R ==
- Ubaldo Ragona
- Simone Rapisarda Casanova
- Filippo Walter Ratti
- Piero Regnoli
- Pina Renzi
- Tonino Ricci
- Gennaro Righelli
- Davide Riondino
- Claudio Risi
- Dino Risi
- Marco Risi
- Nelo Risi
- Antonello Riva
- Alfredo Rizzo
- Alfredo Robert
- Roberto Roberti
- Giuseppe Rocca
- Alice Rohrwacher
- Luca Ronconi
- Brunello Rondi
- Gian Luigi Rondi
- Francesco Rosi
- Gian Paolo Rosmino
- Nello Rossati
- Renzo Rossellini
- Roberto Rossellini
- Franco Rossetti
- Francesco Rosi
- Salvatore Rosso
- Luigi Rovere
- Sergio Rubini
- Antonio Rubino

== S ==
- Vittorio Sala
- Corso Salani
- Luciano Salce
- Vincenzo Salemme
- Enrico Maria Salerno
- Gabriele Salvatores
- Jack Salvatori
- Francesco Salvi
- Guido Salvini
- Salvatore Samperi
- Walter Santesso
- Giancarlo Santi
- Leopoldo Savona
- Massimo Scaglione
- Maurizio Scaparro
- Umberto Scarpelli
- Luigi Scattini
- Aldo Scavarda
- Romano Scavolini
- Franco Scepi
- Riccardo Schicchi
- Mario Schifano
- Tito Schipa jr
- Piero Schivazappa
- Maurizio Sciarra
- Pasquale Scimeca
- Ettore Scola
- Giuseppe Maria Scotese
- Luciano Secchi
- Mario Serandrei
- Gustavo Serena
- Enzo Siciliano
- Mario Siciliano
- Giorgio Simonelli
- Giovanni Simonelli
- Renato Simoni
- Vittorio Sindoni
- Umberto Smaila
- Michele Soavi
- Mario Soldati
- Silvio Soldini
- Sergio Sollima
- Stefano Sollima
- Alberto Sordi
- Paolo Sorrentino
- Paolo Spinola
- Pasquale Squitieri
- Sergio Staino
- Giorgio Strehler

== T ==
- Gino Talamo
- Michele Massimo Tarantini
- Anna Maria Tatò
- Elda Tattoli
- Gianluca Maria Tavarelli
- Paolo Taviani
- Vittorio Taviani
- Vittorio Tedesco Zammarano
- Piero Tellini
- Duccio Tessari
- Sergio Tofano
- Maria Sole Tognazzi
- Ricky Tognazzi
- Ugo Tognazzi
- Giuseppe Tornatore
- Roberta Torre
- Gianni Toti
- Luciano Tovoli
- Fausto Tozzi
- Enzo Trapani
- Luis Trenker
- Leopoldo Trieste
- Massimo Troisi
- Marco Turco
- Carlo Tuzii

== V ==
- Tonino Valerii
- Gino Valori
- Florestano Vancini
- Carlo Vanzina
- Stefano Vanzina
- Giuseppe Vari
- Turi Vasile
- Dino Verde
- Carlo Verdone
- Aldo Vergano
- Giovanni Veronesi
- Marco Vicario
- Piero Vida
- Paolo Virzì
- Eriprando Visconti
- Luchino Visconti
- Piero Vivarelli
- Mario Volpe

== W ==
- Lina Wertmüller
- Fulvio Wetzl
- Edoardo Winspeare

== Z ==
- Pino Zac
- Maurizio Zaccaro
- Giancarlo Zagni
- Gero Zambuto
- Luigi Zampa
- Mario Zampi
- Gianni Zanasi
- Cesare Zavattini
- Franco Zeffirelli
- Primo Zeglio
- Italo Zingarelli
- Giuseppe Zucca
- Piero Zuffi
- Valerio Zurlini

== See also ==
- List of Italian actors
- List of Italian actresses
