= Antonella =

Feminine given name

- Pronunciation: Italian: [antoˈnɛlla]
- Gender: Female
- Language: Italian

Origin
- Origin: Antonius
- Region of origin: Italy

Other names
- Related names: Antonela, Antonia, Antonietta, Antoinette

Antonella is a Danish, Italian, Norwegian, Spanish and Swedish given name that is a diminutive form of Antonia and the feminine form of Antonello used in various regions of the United States, throughout Mexico, Central America, Spanish speaking countries in South America, Spain, Italy, Greenland, Sweden, Denmark, San Marino and Norway. and may refer to:

== People ==
- Antonella Alonso (born 1990), Venezuelan pornographic actress.
- Antonella Anedda (born 1955), Italian writer
- Antonella Attili (born 1963), Italian actress
- Antonella Baldini (born 1966), Italian voice actress
- Antonella Barba (born 1986), American singer
- Antonella Bellutti (born 1968), Italian cyclist
- Antonella Bevilacqua (born 1971), Italian high jumper
- Antonella Bizioli (born 1957), Italian marathoner
- Antonella Bogarín (born 1991), Argentine swimmer
- Antonella Bortolozzi (born 1986), Argentine volleyball player
- Antonella Bragaglia (born 1973), Italian volleyball player
- Antonella Cannarozzi, Italian costume designer
- Antonella Cappuccio (born 1944), Italian artist
- Antonella Capriotti (born 1962), Italian long jumper and triple jumper
- Antonella Carta (born 1967), Italian footballer
- Antonella Clerici (born 1962), Italian television host and journalist
- Antonella Confortola (married name Wyatt, born 1975), Italian cross-country skier and mountain runner.
- Antonella Corazza (born 1965), Italian rower
- Antonella Costa (born 1980), Argentine actress
- Antonella De Santo, Italian physicist
- Antonella Del Core (born 1980), Italian volleyball player
- Antonella Elia (born 1963), Italian entertainer
- Antonella Falcione (born 1991), Argentine squash player
- Antonella Gambino (born 1990), Argentinian handball player
- Antonella Gambotto-Burke (née Antonella Gambotto, born 1965), Italian-Australian author and journalist
- Antonella Grassi, American mathematician
- Antonella Interlenghi (born 1960), Italian actress, also known as Antonellina Interlenghi
- Antonella Kerr, Marchioness of Lothian, also known as Tony Lothian, (born Antonella Reuss Newland; 1922 – 2007), Italian-born British aristocrat
- Antonella Lualdi (1931–2023), Italian actress and singer
- Antonella Mosetti (born 1975), Italian entertainer
- Antonella Mularoni (born 1961), Sammarinese politician
- Antonella Palmisano (born 1991), Italian female racewalker
- Antonella Ponce (born 1997), Ecuadorian entertainer
- Antonella Ponziani (born 1964), Italian actress
- Antonella Ragno-Lonzi (born 1940), Italian fencer
- Antonella Rebuzzi (1954 – 2018), Italian politician
- Antonella Rinaldi (born 1954), Italian actress
- Antonella Ríos (born 1974), Chilean actress
- Antonella Roncelli (born 1959), Italian swimmer
- Antonella Ruggiero (born 1952), Italian singer
- Antonella Salvucci (born 1981), Italian model, journalist, TV personality, and actress.
- Antonella Scanavino (born 1992), Uruguayan swimmer
- Antonella Sorace, linguist
- Antonietta Stefanini, best known as Antonella Steni, (1926 – 2016), Italian actress
- Antonella Terenzi (born 1965), Italian synchronized swimmer
- Antonella Tosti, Italian physician and scientist
- Antonella Valentini, (born 1958), Italian former swimmer
- Antonella Colonna Vilasi, Italian historian
- Antonella Serra Zanetti (born 1980), Italian tennis player

== See also ==
- Antonela
- Antonella (TV series), Argentine Telenovela
- Antonelli
- Antonello (name)
