= Antonello (name) =

Antonello is an Italian masculine given name as well as a nickname and surname that is a variant of Antonio. Notable people with this name include the following:

== Given name ==
- Antonello Bacciocchi (1957–2007), Sammarinese politician
- Antonello Bonci (born 1966), Italian neurologist
- Antonello Crescenzio, the son of Antonio Crescenzio, (born early 16th century), Italian sculptor and painter
- Antonello Cuccureddu (born 1949), Italian footballer
- Antonello da Caserta (fl 14th and 15th century), Italian composer
- Antonello da Messina (c. 1430 – 1479), Italian painter
- Antonello de Folgore (died 1590), Italian Roman Catholic bishop
- Antonello Eustachi (died 1544), Italian Roman Catholic bishop
- Antonello Fassari (1952–2025), Italian actor and comedian
- Antonello Gagini (1478–1536), Italian sculptor
- Antonello Manacorda (born 1970), Italian violinist and conductor
- Antonello Matarazzo (born 1962), Italian artist
- Antonello Padovano (born 1955), Italian film director and producer
- Antonello Palombi (1968―2026), Italian operatic tenor
- Antonello Joseph Sarte Perez, known as AJ Perez (1993–2011), Filipino actor
- Antonello Petrucci (died 1487), Italian nobleman
- Antonello Riccio (active 1576), Italian painter
- Antonello Riva (born 1962), Italian basketball player
- Antonello Savelli (c. 1450 – 1498), Italian condottiero
- Antonello Silverini (born 1966), Italian illustrator
- Antonello Trombadori (1917–1993), Italian politician
- Antonello Zappadu (born 1957), Italian photo reporter

== Nickname ==
- Antonello Grimaldi nickname of Antonio Luigi Grimaldi (born 1955), Italian actor, director, and screenwriter
- Antonello Soro (born Antonio Giuseppe Soro, 1948), Italian politician
- Antonello Venditti, nickname of Antonio Venditti (born 1949), Italian singer-songwriter
- Antonello Carozza, nickname of Antonio Carozza, (born 1985), Italian singer, songwriter, composer, art director

== Surname ==
- Bill Antonello (1927–1993), American baseball player
- Brent Antonello (born 1989), American actor
- Juliano Roberto Antonello, known as Juca (footballer, born 1979), (born 1979), Brazilian footballer

== See also ==
- Antonella
- Antonelli
