= Antonelli =

Antonelli is an Italian surname. Notable people with the surname include:

- Alessandro Antonelli (1798–1888), Italian architect
- Alexandre Antonelli (born 1978), Brazilian executive director
- Andrea Antonelli (1988–2013), Italian motorcycle racer
- Battista Antonelli (or Bautista) (1547–1616) an Italian military engineer designed fortresses in Spanish colonial cities in the Caribbean, including Cartagena de Indias, in Cartagena Colombia and in Havana Cuba, as well as, San Juan Bautista in Puerto Rico.
- Carlotta Antonelli (born 1995), Italian actress
- Cosimo Antonelli (1925–2014), Italian water polo player
- Domenico Antonelli (1857–1943), manufacturer
- Dominic A. Antonelli (born 1967), American astronaut
- Dominic F. Antonelli Jr. (1922-2010), American businessman
- Ennio Antonelli (born 1936), Catholic cardinal
- Filippo Antonelli (born 1978), Italian football player
- Francesco Antonelli (footballer) (born 1999), Italian footballer
- Giacomo Antonelli (1806–1876), lay cardinal
- Giovanna Antonelli (born 1976), Brazilian actress
- Giovanni Antonelli (1818–1872), Italian scientist, astronomer and engineer
- Giovanni Antonelli (archivist) (1919–2009), Italian archivist, historian and politician
- John W. Antonelli (1917–1999), American Marine Corps general and Navy Cross recipient
- Johnny Antonelli (1930–2020), baseball player
- Juan Bautista Antonelli, Italian engineer of the 15th century
- Kathleen Antonelli (1921–2006), ENIAC programmer
- Kimi Antonelli (born 2006), Italian racing driver
- Laura Antonelli (1941–2015), Italian film actress
- Leonardo Antonelli (1730–1811), Italian cardinal
- Lou Antonelli (1957–2021), American writer
- Louis Antonelli, American filmmaker and poet
- Luca Antonelli (born 1987), Italian football player
- Marco Antonelli (born 1964), Italian racing driver
- Matt Antonelli (born 1985), baseball player
- Niccolò Antonelli (born 1996), Italian motorcycle racer
- Paola Antonelli (born 1963), Italian architect
- Peter L. Antonelli (1941–2020), American mathematician
- Pietro Antonelli (1853–1901), Italian diplomat, explorer and politician
- Severo Antonelli (1907–1995), Italian-American photographer

== See also ==
- Antonella
- Antonellis
- Antonello (name)
- Giuseppe Antonicelli
