= Cappuccio (disambiguation) =

Cappuccio is an Italian word, used for a type of headgear. It may refer to:

== People ==
- Alejandro Cappuccio (born 1976), Uruguayan football coach and notary
- Antonella Cappuccio (born 1944), Italian artist
- Ciccio Cappuccio (1842–1892), Italian Camorrista
- Ruggero Cappuccio (born 1964), Italian playwright

== Wine ==
- Nerello Cappuccio, an Italian variety of red wine grape
