= Rebuzzi =

Rebuzzi is a surname. Notable people with the surname include:

- Antonella Rebuzzi (1954–2018), Italian politician
- Pietro Rebuzzi (1918–?), Italian footballer
