= Luisa Tasca =

Italian historian

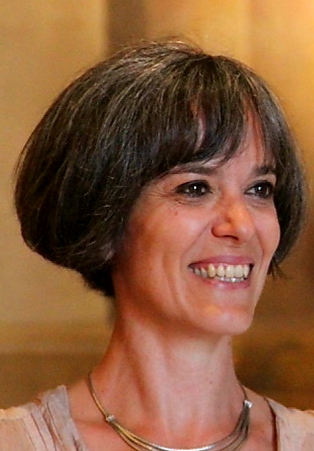

Academic background
- Education: European University Institute
- Thesis: Galatei : buone maniere e cultura borghese nell'Italia dell'Ottocent (2002)

Luisa Tasca is an Italian historian known for her work on social and cultural history.

== Education and career ==
Tasca was a student at the University of Venice where she studied history. She earned a Ph.D. in History and Civilisation from the European University Institute, Florence in 2002. Tasca taught at the University of Florence from 2016 to 2020, and then she moved to the Free University of Bozen-Bolzano where she taught from 2021 until 2024.

Tasca is the editor of the journal, “Passato e Presente”.

== Works ==
In her first book, Galatei. Buone maniere e cultura borghese nell’Italia dell’Ottocento (2004) she interpreted the etiquette books published in nineteenth-century Italy as a tool for building an ideal society. In her second monograph, Le vite e la storia (2010) she examined the characteristics a life had to have in order for it to become an autobiography in nineteenth-century Italy. The collection of essays she edited, La storia raccontata ai bambini (2019), dealt with the transmission of history to children. In her latest book, The Science of the Child in Liberal Italy (2024), she has brought to light a forgotten chapter in Italian history: the contribution of Italian teachers, scholars, and doctors to the international child study movement between the 1880s and the first World War.

== Selected publications ==
- Tasca, Luisa; Hilwig, Stuart (2004). "The "Average Housewife" in Post-World War II Italy". Journal of Women's History. 16 (2): 92–115. doi:10.1353/jowh.2004.0055. ISSN 1527-2036.
- Galatei. Buone maniere e cultura borghese nell’Italia dell’Ottocento, Le Lettere, Firenze, 2004 ISBN 978-88-71-66834-5
- Le vite e la storia. Autobiografie nell’Italia dell’Ottocento, il Mulino, Bologna, 2010 (ISBN 978-88-15-13809-5)
- (ed.), La storia raccontata ai bambini, Le Monnier, Firenze, 2019 (ISBN 978-88-00-74927-5)
- The Science of the Child in Liberal Italy, Palgrave Macmillan, London, 2024 (ISBN 978-3-031-65777-1)
- Piccoli primitivi. Scienza e studio dell’infanzia nell’Italia liberale, Carocci, Roma, 2024 (ISBN 978-88-29-02702-6)
