= Norbert Conrad Kaser =

Italian poet and writer

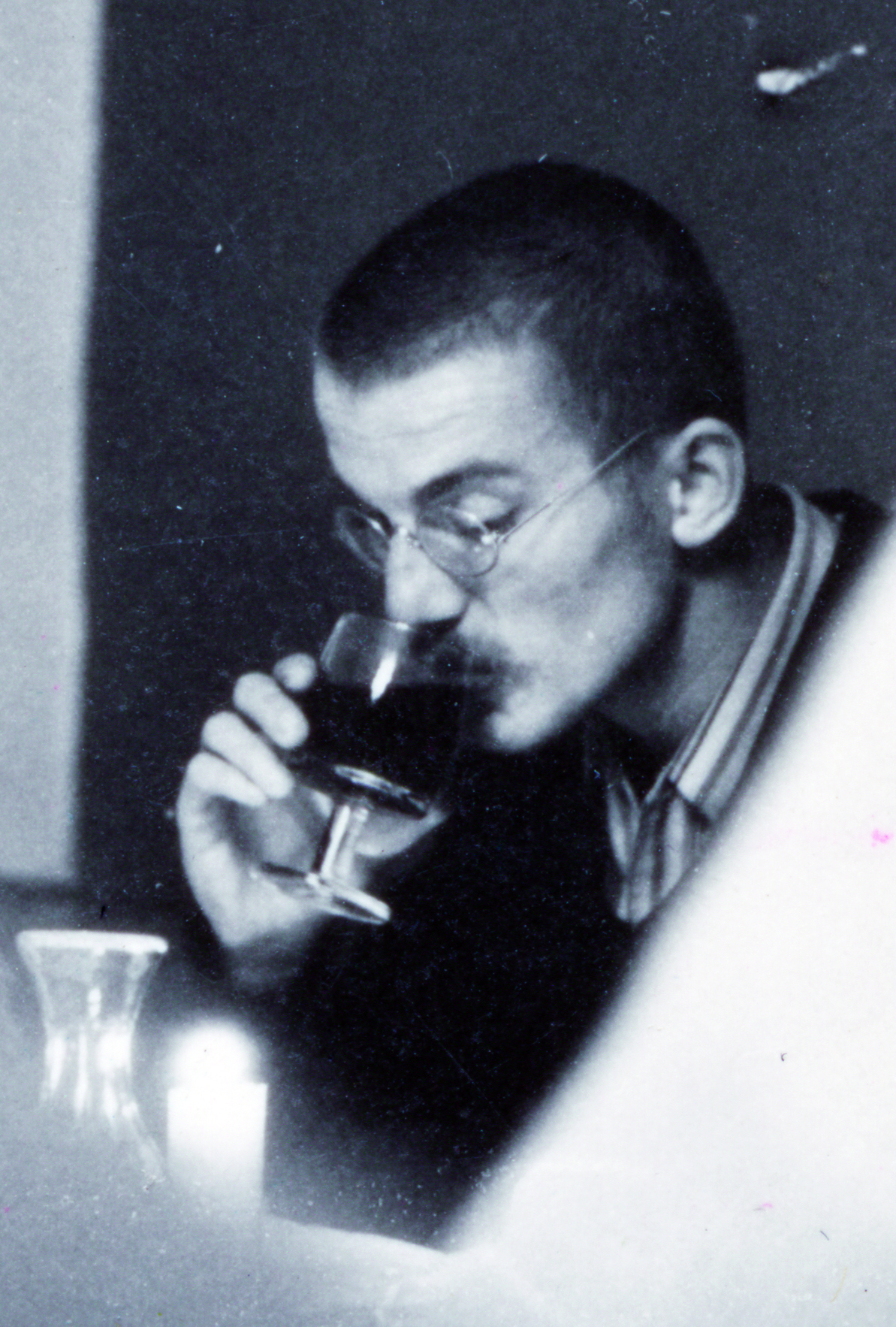
Norbert Conrad Kaser Klaus Gasperi

Norbert Conrad Kaser (19 April 1947 – 21 August 1978) was a writer and poet from the ethnically conflicted South Tyrol / Alto Adige region of north-eastern (since 1918) Italy. His literary works and polemical writings contributed significantly to the establishment of a new South Tyrolean literature during the later 1960s. Much of his work was published only after his death at the early age of 31. Kaser was politically engaged: while many of his attitudes defy easy pigeon-holing, he was born into the region's German-speaking community, and in most respects he comes across as part of the political-intellectual left. Outside Italy, Kaser's work has become better known across the German speaking world only posthumously.

== Biography ==
Norbert C. Kaser was born in Brixen, a regional centre and the seat of a former Prince-Bishopric roughly 25 miles up-river of Bolzano. Paula Thum, his mother, was not married to Alois Mairunteregger (1913-1957), his father. Despite the social conventions of the time and place, Mairunteregger refused to "legitimize" his son retrospectively by marrying the child's mother. The infant was initially farmed out, looked after at one point by the "Grey Sisters of Saint Elizabeth". When Norbert was 10 his father was killed in an accident. By that time his mother had married Franz Kaser, a disabled war veteran and a carpenter by training, who adopted and thereby belatedly "legitimized" Norbert. Norbert Kaser was now able to grow up living with his mother and step-father. No longer able to work at his chosen trade, Franz Kaser instead supported the little family by working as a caretaker-gatekeeper with "J. Moessmer & Co., Nachfolger", a sheep-wool processing factory in nearby Bruneck. The job came with a "service flat", and the family accordingly lived on the factory premises. After completing his compulsory schooling Norbert Kaser transferred to the "Humanistische Gymnasium" (secondary school) at Bruneck, along the Puster Valley. His school career was badly disrupted by serious kidney illness. For much of the time he was nevertheless able to contribute to the family budget, taking jobs washing cars, selling crockery and undertaking hotel clerical work. In 1966 he sat for but failed the Matura (schooling completion exam) which would have opened the way to university-level education. He now left the Puster Valley, relocating to Laas (Vinschgau), a small remote town near the Swiss frontier, some fifty miles to the west. The principal industry in Laas involved marble quarrying: here, during 1966/67, he took a teaching job at the local middle school.

1967 also marked what Kaser would describe as his "entry into literature". publishing his poem "die brücke" ("the bridge") (Note: Kaser made a conscious decision early on to dispense with capital letters, along with punctuation and umlauts, in his published texts.) in the "Südtiroler Zeitschrift", a locally produced and now defunct magazine which slightly unusually (even in the South Tyrol / Alto Adige) was published in two languages. That was quickly followed by his first little volume of poetry, which he entitled "probegaenge" (loosely, "rehearsal"), of which he distributed homemade copies to friends. Between 1967 and 1970 he produced seven such volumes. In 1968 Kaser joined the little Capuchin monastery in Bruneck. He remained with the order for only six months. Shortly after leaving, however, and at the third attempt, he passed the Matura school final exam as a "private student". He participated at the "Youth Culture Week" in Innsbruck during the second part of May 1969. Armed with his exam-pass, in October 1969 he relocated to Vienna, where he embarked on a university-level course in Art history, while living in "an allotment garden settlement" in the Hernals (north-central) quarter of the city.

By the time he moved to Vienna, Norbert Kaser had already acquired a significant public profile in his South Tyrol home region, after giving a poetry reading and interview to the local Bolzano-based service of the RAI (Italian state broadcaster) in July 1969. Then, on 27 August 1969 he delivered a savagely polemical speech at the thirteenth "Studientagung" (student conference) of the South Tyrolean Student association, which that year was organised by Gerhard Mumelter and held at the Cusanus Academy in Brixen. He denounced the state of South Tyrolean literature. He mocked the pre-war fashion for poetry romanticising nature and stirring the reader to patriotic fervour. Another major concern which he set out was the extent to which much of the region's literature had been presented, ever since the political "Italianization" campaigns of the Mussolini years, in translation. Kaser himself wrote in both Italian and in German, and he insisted in his speech that the process of translating text intended for one language into the other detracted unnecessarily from its literary merits. His opening salvo set the mood for the entire speech: "99% of our South Tyrolean writer should never have been born". (Note: "99% unserer Südtiroler Literaten wären am besten nie geboren, meinetwegen können sie noch heute ins heimatliche Gras beißen, um nicht weiteres Unheil anzurichten.") There was more along the same lines. Then, possibly concerned that there might still be audience members whom he had not sufficiently annoyed, he turned to the South Tyrolean flag with its red eagle motif: "There are still so many sacred cows hanging around here. The slaughter will be a grand affair. The knives are sharpened, ready. And among the butchers there are, to be sure, one or two who remain true to their profession, who will relish the opportunity to pluck the Tyrolean eagle like a chicken, and roast it nice and slowly on the spit". (Note: "Bei uns stehn noch so viele heilige Kühe herum, dass man vor lauter Kühen nichts mehr sieht. Das Schlachtfest wird grandios werden. Die Messer sind gewetzt. Und unter den Schlächtern sind sicher zwei drei Leute, die beim Beruf bleiben, denen es gefällt, den Tiroler Adler wie einen Gigger zu rupfen und ihn schön langsam über dem Feuer zu drehen.") A storm of media indignation ensued. Kaser almost certainly did not anticipate the extent of the media outrage that his speech unleashed, but there are nevertheless indications that he quite enjoyed all the attention. He carefully copied out the press reactions and the published "letters to the editor", and using the copying technology available at the time designed a title page, to which he added the heading "How it comes out, if you poke a stick in the wasps' nest" (Note: "wie man ins wespennest sticht, so sticht es heraus.")

During 1970 he travelled to Norway where he stayed two months, supporting himself with a summer job as a community worker on the island of Stord. He was by now publishing more and more texts in the appropriate literary journals. He continued to be based in Vienna between 1969 and 1971. It was a productive period in terms of published output. In March 1971 he broke off his studies in Vienna and returned to the South Tyrol. He worked as a teacher at a middle school servicing the villages around Vernuer (Riffian) during 1971/72 and at another school at Flaas (Jenesien) between 1973 and 1975. His commitment to teaching leaves literary traces in his published texts, which include fables and poems for children. At the Vernuer school, evidence of his dedication survived in a large wall-painting he produced with some of his pupils on a classroom wall. Subsequently, there were further temporary teaching assignments, filling in staffing gaps as a "supply teacher". Along with his poetic texts, he was also providing news-based journalistic contributions to local newspapers through this period.

Ill with kidney disease as a schoolboy during the 1950s, Kaser was considered delicate throughout his life, and in July 1975 he was diagnosed with liver disease. Sources, including those referencing the poet's own correspondence, indicate an above average level of alcohol consumption throughout his adult life, and his dependency seems to have worsened through the 1970s. Between October and December 1975 Kaser was accommodated for three months as an inmate at a Verona psychiatric clinic. During his final years there would be a number of further, mostly briefer, stays in hospitals and clinics. In the early summer of 1976, following the death of his step-father in January, he undertook a six-week cure at a thermal-medical facility in the German Democratic Republic, at Bad Berka, which also afforded the chance to take a number of day trips to nearby Weimar, without becoming encumbered, as he put it, by "Germany's eternal Goethe-Schiller controversy".

In April 1976 he left the church and joined the Italian Communist Party, though his correspondence suggests that he never became an uncritical party loyalist. During 1976 and 1977 he took the opportunity to travel abroad more frequently than hitherto. One of the later trips was one he made to Tunisia in a connection with plans for a film to be produced with his friend Ivo Barnabò Micheli. During his final years Kaser also took an increasing number of short trips to Italian cities, notably to Venice, Trieste and Apulia.

Interaction with the nearby Italian culture was a particularly important element in Kaser's work. He translated poems by Franco Fortini, Umberto Saba and Salvatore Quasimodo, as well as writing Italian texts of his own. Beyond landscapes and places, it was again and again works of art and the images they presented that provided the impetus for his writing. Just as important was his intimate knowledge of the language of the bible, the legends of Catholicism. Kaser's awareness of the important biblical roles of those who resisted the social and political tides of their times is frequently apparent in his own writings, alongside his own brand of radical Christian religiosity. That is also reflected in his important personal rejection of the church in 1976, "because I am a religious person". Repeatedly, he dealt with the local realities of the region, employing satyr and polemic in equal measure in the weekly newspaper contributions that sere a feature of his final years. He railed against "traditionalist groups", against the "monster tourist traffic" and against the creation of ethnic blocs. A dedicated South Tyrol patriot, in one of his final pieces he wrote, "I remain loyal to my native valley with both disgust and loyalty". (Note: "ich bleibe mit mut & ekel meinem tal treu".)

Norbert Conrad Kaser died from liver cirrhosis on 21 August 1978 in the hospital at Bruneck. He had been terminally ill for some years. His final poem, "ich krieg ein kind" ("i'm expecting a child"), references his bloated abdomen and describes the physical deterioration of his final months. Like all his poems it is carefully dated – in this instance, 28 July 1978. It carries no title, but is identified in sources by the first line.
