= Antonellis =

Antonellis is a surname deriving from the name Antonius. Notable people with this surname include the following:

- Darcy Antonellis (born 1962), American businesswoman
- Valeria De Antonellis, Italian computer scientist

== See also ==
- Antonelli
