= Lindsay M. De Biase =

American neuroscientist

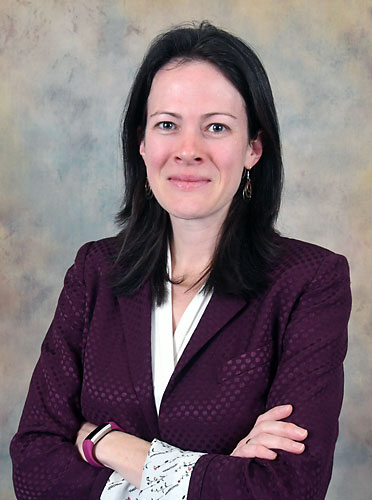
- De Biase in 2018
- Education: Yale University; Johns Hopkins School of Medicine; National Institute on Drug Abuse
- Known for: Diversity of microglia in the brain parenchyma
- Awards: 2019 Glen Foundation and American Foundation for Aging Research Grant, 2018 NARSAD Young Investigator Award, 2017 NIDA Women’s Science Advisory Committee, Excellence in Scientific Research Award
- Scientific career
- Fields: Neuroscience, glial biology
- Workplaces: University of California, Los Angeles

Lindsay M. De Biase is an American neuroscientist and glial biologist as well as an assistant professor at the David Geffen School of Medicine at the University of California, Los Angeles. De Biase explores the diversity of microglia that exist within the basal ganglia circuitry to one day target regional or circuit-specific microglia in disease. De Biase's graduate work highlighted the existence and roles of neuron-OPC synapses in development and her postdoctoral work was critical in showing that microglia are not homogenous within the brain parenchyma.

== Early life and education ==
De Biase pursued her undergraduate degree at Yale University in New Haven, Connecticut. De Biase majored in Cellular, Molecular, and Developmental Biology and received her Bachelors of Science in 2003. After completing her degree at Yale, De Biase worked as a research technician in the lab of Eric Hoffman at the Children's National Medical Center in Washington, D.C. De Biase explored gene expression changes in amyotrophic lateral sclerosis in addition to characterizing various immune cell states. Along with the Hoffman Lab, De Biase explored the gene expression of T helper cells. She found that TH2 cells express the NKG2A and CD56 upon activation while TH1 cells do not.

Following her time as a researcher technician, in 2005 De Biase pursued her graduate degree at Johns Hopkins School of Medicine. De Biase completed her graduate training in neuroscience under the mentorship of Dwight Bergles. She explored the synapses and signaling between neurons and oligodendrocyte precursor cells.

De Biase first characterized the expression patterns and roles of NG2+ oligodendrocyte progenitors in the mouse brain. She found that these NG2+ cells, which go on to form oligodendrocytes later in development, have a unique early expression of voltage gated sodium channels, ionotropic glutamate receptors, and they form synapses with glutamatergic neurons. She further found that these cells exhibited low amplitude spikes, but not action potentials and that later in their development, this spiking ability was lost as well as their synaptic input and glutamate receptors. Overall her early results showed that oligodendrocyte progenitors, through their glutamatergic synapses with neurons, are able to monitor neural activity early in development before transitioning into their oligodendrocyte identities. Next, De Biase explored the role of NMDARs on oligodendrocyte precursors (OPCs) in oligodendrocyte differentiation. When she knocked out NMDARs in OPCs, De Biase did not observe effects on differentiation or cell survival, but she did find significant changes in AMPAR expression, suggesting that NMDARs help to regulate AMPAR signalling with neighbouring axons in development. Overall, De Biase's graduate work highlighted the novel roles and functions of previously unknown OPC-neuron synapses in development.

== Career and research ==
De Biase completed her graduate training in 2011 and then pursued her postdoctoral work under the mentorship of Antonello Bonci at the National Institute on Drug Abuse. De Biase explored the diversity of microglial phenotypes across basal ganglia nuclei, which called into question prior hypotheses about the homogeneity of microglia in the central nervous system. Her discoveries in the Bonci Lab laid the foundation for her independent career and research program.

In 2018, De Biase joined the faculty at the David Geffen School of Medicine at the University of California, Los Angeles. De Biase is an assistant professor in the Department of Physiology and is the principal investigator of the De Biase Lab. The research focus of the De Biase Lab is the development and functions of the diversity of microglia within the basal ganglia circuitry. Based on De Biase's postdoctoral work, microglia appear to be specialized to different brain regions and neural circuits, which allows for specific development of therapies for neurological and psychiatric diseases that target circuit specific microglia based on their unique gene expression, functions, and roles in disease. The De Biase Lab uses high resolution imaging techniques, electrophysiological recordings of microglia, and gene expression analyses to probe microglia in their different circuits and states in the basal ganglia.

=== Diversity of microglia phenotypes ===
Since microglia originate from the same yolk sac progenitors, it has been thought that microglia are homogenous within the brain parenchyma. In probing the roles of microglia in the basal ganglia, De Biase called this hypothesis into question. She found that the anatomical features, lysosomal content, membrane properties, and transcriptomes of microglia differ across the basal ganglia nuclei. These regional differences in microglia phenotype were established within the second postnatal week and are reinforced by local environmental cues. Her findings suggest a critical role for circuit specific microglia contributing to the unique functions and roles of specific neural circuits in the brain. Following up this work in her own lab at UCLA, De Biase and her team explored the time course of microglia specialization and dynamics of microglia maturation across the mesolimbic neural circuits. They found that by the second postnatal week, microglia population numbers peak in nucleus accumbens (NAc) and by the third postnatal week they peak in the ventral tegmental area (VTA). The surge of microglia population expansion occurs on postnatal day 8, only once the microglia have tiled the brain in an even fashion. Microglia then undergo cell death to reach adult brain levels of microglia expression. Lastly, De Biase and her group observed that the regional differences in microglia expression begin around postnatal day 8. Overall, their results showed that during this time of divergence in microglial identity, microglia may play a highly active role in shaping neural circuits.

== Awards and honors ==
- 2019 Glen Foundation and American Foundation for Aging Research Grant for Junior Faculty
- 2018 NARSAD Young Investigator Award
- 2017 NIDA Postdoctoral Fellow Mentoring Award
- 2017 NIDA Women's Science Advisory Committee, Excellence in Scientific Research Award
- 2014-2016 Fellows Award for Research Excellence, NIH
- 2009 Robert Goodman Scholars Award, Johns Hopkins School of Medicine
