= Library of the Free University of Bozen-Bolzano =

The Library of the Free University of Bozen/Bolzano
- German: Bibliothek der Freien Universität Bozen; Italian: Biblioteca universitaria di Bolzano
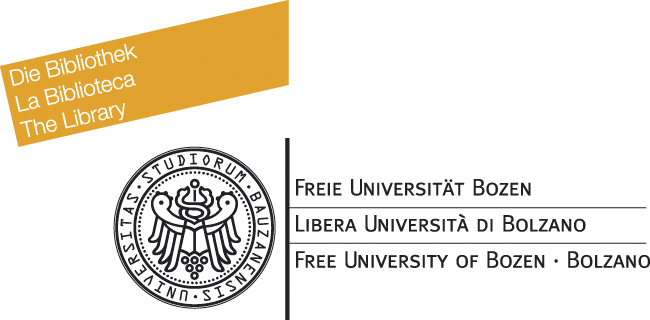
- 46.49818°N 11.35075°E
- Location: Bozen/Bolzano, South Tyrol, Italy
- Type: University library
- Established: 1998; 28 years ago

Collection
- Size: 190,865 cataloged books

Other information
- Affiliation: Free University of Bozen-Bolzano
- Website: www.unibz.it/eng

The Library of the Free University of Bozen-Bolzano (German: Bibliothek der Freien Universität Bozen, Italian: Biblioteca universitaria di Bolzano) is a university library located in Bozen/Bolzano, South Tyrol, Italy. Established in 1998, the library forms part of the big scientific libraries of South Tyrol, similar to the "Dr. Friedrich Teßmann" library, and is associated with the Free University of Bozen-Bolzano.

== Overview ==
The media of the University Library are mainly available in three languages of the Free University of Bozen-Bolzano (German, Italian and English). At the location in Brixen-Bressanone there are Ladin media, too. The Library has its main seat in the central building of the Free University in Bozen-Bolzano (Universitätsplatz 1 - Piazza Università 1). Other locations are situated in Brixen-Bressanone and in Bruneck-Brunico. With the Library of the University of Theology and Philosophy of Brixen-Bressanone, the oldest scientific library of the province, there exists a close collaboration. Until the university building in Brixen-Bressanone was not finished, the premises of the University of Theology and Philosophy were used.

== History ==
With the foundation of the Free University of Bozen-Bolzano began the organization of the University Library. Thanks to the financial support of the Foundation of Südtiroler Sparkasse – Cassa di Risparmio di Bolzano, the Library developed to an institution, which is geared towards students' needs and which is deep-seated within the trilingual region. It assumes important electronic services within the library system of South Tyrol. Since 1998 the Library's collection is accessible through an online catalogue and the setup of an eLibrary started.

== Organisation ==
Like the university itself, the Library has three locations: Bolzano, Bressanone and Brunico but Bolzano functions as the central library. For a better service the primary subdivision in Branch libraries in 2008 has been dispersed and four overlapping departments have been founded:

- Online Services & Resources (Digital Library)
- Subject & Liaison Librarians (specialist counselling and support of students and scientists)
- Customer Service (non-electronic library services and customer service)
- Media processing (acquisition, local public infrastructure and allocation of information carriers and information).

The library services of departments which are not situated on the university campus, like the Language Centre, are coordinated and supervised by the central library in Bolzano or the libraries in Bressanone or Brunico.

== Main tasks ==
The main task of the Library of the Free University of Bozen-Bolzano is it to provide the information required for teaching and learning, research and lifelong learning. Other tasks are:

- the construction and development of a digital library
- the mediation of information literacy through courses, instruction and training
- the allocation of various spaces for sophisticated styles of science and learning
- the development of innovative solutions and active participation in research projects, networking with national and international partners.

=== Services ===
During the academic year the Library in Bozen-Bolzano remains open until midnight. In the academic year 2009/2010, the opening hours during the exam period were extended for Free University of Bozen-Bolzano students and the Library was open on Sundays, too. Graduates, postgraduates and academic staff can have unlimited access. In Bruneck-Brunico students can use the Library from Monday-Sunday from 8AM-10PM.

If library users need media which are not available within the region, they can make an interlibrary loan request by completing a form on the Library's homepage.

The Library offers a free delivery service between the libraries of Brunico-Bruneck, Bressanone-Brixen and Bolzano-Bozen. Since February 2007 there has also been a delivery service between the University Library and the Schlandersburg Library in Schlanders (Vinschgau). Since 2010 media can also be ordered from the Library of the Ladin Cultural Institute Micurà de Rü in San Martin de Tor in Val Badia.

The University Press is the own publishing company of the Free University of Bozen-Bolzano and the Library is coordinating this service since November 2007.

=== Spaces and facilities ===
At the beginning there were no buildings available to house the libraries as they first had to be planned and to be constructed. The libraries were therefore located in temporary premises.

The Library in Bolzano was situated in the former hospital in the city centre of Bolzano. The Bressanone library was housed in the University of Theology and Philosophy in Bressanone. This library was enlarged and rebuilt to accommodate the University Library's collections. Although today these two scientific libraries are divided location-wise, they still work together closely.

Following the construction projects for the university's new premises, the libraries in Bolzano and Bressanone became integrated into the new buildings (completion in Bolzano in 2003 and in Bressanone in 2004).

In Brunico there has been built a new building together with the Civic Library (completed in 2013). There is located also the city archive and the estate of the author N.C. Kaser.

== Collections and departments ==
As of 2014, the collection contained:

- 256,850 Books and Non-Book-Material
- 61,648 E-Books
- 1,159 Subscribed Print Journals
- 76,816 E-Resources
- 91 Databases.

The Library's collection is based on the study and research areas of the university's departments (like the Language Centre) and the five faculties of the Free University of Bozen-Bolzano. The collection covers the following subject areas: economics, law, agricultural sciences, engineering, pedagogy, psychology, sociology, computer science, art and linguistics. In addition media from related academic fields and for language acquisition are acquired. Because of the university's trilingualism most of the media are in German, Italian or English.

For the acquisition of books and other media, the Library follows clearly defined patterns and inserts Approval Plans. The library is also committed to fulfill the current needs of its users. The suggestions they make tend to be acted upon quickly and users can use the media without any bureaucratic obstacles. Since autumn 2009 the Library has been offering a great number of e-books.

The University Library's collections are catalogued according to the RVK (= Regensburger Verbundklassifikation). The whole collection can be researched by using the online catalogue.

== Financing ==
Most of the money to finance the Library comes from the provincial government of South Tyrol. A small percentage comes from the Governmental Department for Education, university and Research and from tuition fees.

The Südtiroler Sparkasse Foundation supports the university and therefore also the Library. The Südtiroler Sparkasse Foundation also finances special projects.

== Projects ==
Since its foundation the Library has collaborated with departments within the university and with external institutions, especially for digital innovations. One of the first projects was the translation of the RVK (= Regensburger Verbundklassifikation) into English and Italian and the guidelines were recorded in the document "Brixener Richtlinien" (29 July 1999).

In collaboration with the Faculty of Computer Science of the Free University of Bozen-Bolzano, "Chatbot" had been developed. The "Cybrarian" supported the librarians' work and answered questions 24 hours 7 days a week. Because of huge changes within the customer service the project "Bob" had been stopped.

Another research project, which was sponsored by the European Union, dealt with "The Development of Multilingual Retrieval systems", and was called CACAO (Cross-Language Access to Catalogues and On-Line Libraries). MuSIL (Multilingual Search in Libraries), which was developed by the Library in cooperation with the Faculty of Computer Science and the company CELI and which has been online since October 2007, was the basis for this EU project and has been the first result of this research collaboration.

The Meta-Catalogue includes the following Southtyrolean Libraries:

- Library of the Free University of Bozen-Bolzano
- Library of the EURAC Research
- Library of the University of Theology and Philosophy of Brixen-Bressanone
- Library of the Museion
- Library of the Ladin Cultural Institute Micurà de Rü
- Catalogue of the project Indexing Historical Libraries
- Library of the German Pedagogic Institute.

In 2012 the Meta-Catalogue has been taken over from a Discovery System, which made it possible to find with one search request both electronic and printed media. The University Library changed the library system in 2013: it participated on the early adopter program of Ex Libris and as the first library of continental Europe it went online with Ex Libris' Alma.

== Cooperations ==
The leading information facilities on the Innsbruck-Bozen-Trent axis decided to cooperate in a more intensive way by realizing different projects and services.

Together with the Research Centre for Agriculture and Forestry Laimburg and the Südtiroler Bauernbund, the Library is working on a virtual agricultural catalogue.

There is a further cooperation with the ESSPER-Service, which evaluates the Italian economic journals. Conventions for an intense collaboration in regard to inventory build-up and the reciprocal stock utilization were made with the University of Theology and Philosophy of Brixen-Bressanone and the Eurac Institute. In January 2011 the collection of the Museion has been moved to the Library of the Free University of Bozen-Bolzano. The same year the stocking of the conservatory C. Monteverdi Bozen-Bolzano has been integrated, too. Since December 2013 all media of the Library of EURAC Research Bozen-Bolzano, of the Library of the University of Theology and Philosophy of Brixen-Bressanone, of the Library of the Research Centre for Agriculture and Forestry Laimburg and of the University Library are researchable through one common catalogue. In 2014 with the coordination and with the technical support of the University Library Bozen-Bolzano the platform Scientific Library South Tyrol went online. There had been added the stockings of the Library of the Ladin Cultural Institute "Micurà de Rü", of the Ladin Educational and Cultural Department and of the Museum of Nature South Tyrol Bozen-Bolzano.

== Rankings ==
Like other libraries, the Library of the Free University of Bozen-Bolzano makes use of the "BIX" (=Bibliotheksindex), the benchmarking system for scientific libraries. In this way, the Library knows its position among other libraries and can therefore improve its services.

"GIM" (Gruppo Interuniversitario per il Monitoraggio dei Sistemi Bibliotecari di Ateneo) is the benchmarking system in Italy since 2000.

- 2015: 3.5 stars in the BIX
- 2014: 4 stars in the BIX
- 2013: 3.5 stars in the BIX
- 2012: 4 stars in the BIX
- 2008, 2009, 2011: 2nd place in the BIX
- 2010: 3rd place in the BIX.
