= Antonela =

Antonela is Croatian a feminine given name that is a diminutive form of Antonia and an alternate form of Antonella used in Croatia. Notable people with this name include the following:

- Antonela Anić (born 1985), Croatian basketball player
- Antonela Curatola (born 1991), Argentine volleyball player
- Antonela Đinđić, known Nela, Croatian singer and songwriter
- Antonela Ferenčić (born 1994), Croatian racing cyclist
- Antonela Fortuna (born 1995), Argentine volleyball player
- Antonela Mena (born 1988), Argentine handball player

== See also ==
- Antonella
- Antoneta Papapavli
