= Free University of Bozen-Bolzano =

University in Italy

Free University of Bozen - Bolzano
- Libera Università di Bolzano; Freie Universität Bozen; Università Liedia de Bulsan
- Latin: Universitas Studiorum Bauzanensis
- Motto: Trilingual and intercultural
- Type: Private promoted by public entity
- Established: 1997
- President: Ulrike Tappeiner
- Rector: Alex Weissensteiner
- Director: Günther Mathá
- Administrative staff: 646 professors and researchers; 295 technical and administrative
- Students: 4488
- Location: Bozen-Bolzano and Brixen, Italy
- Campus: Urban
- Website: www.unibz.it

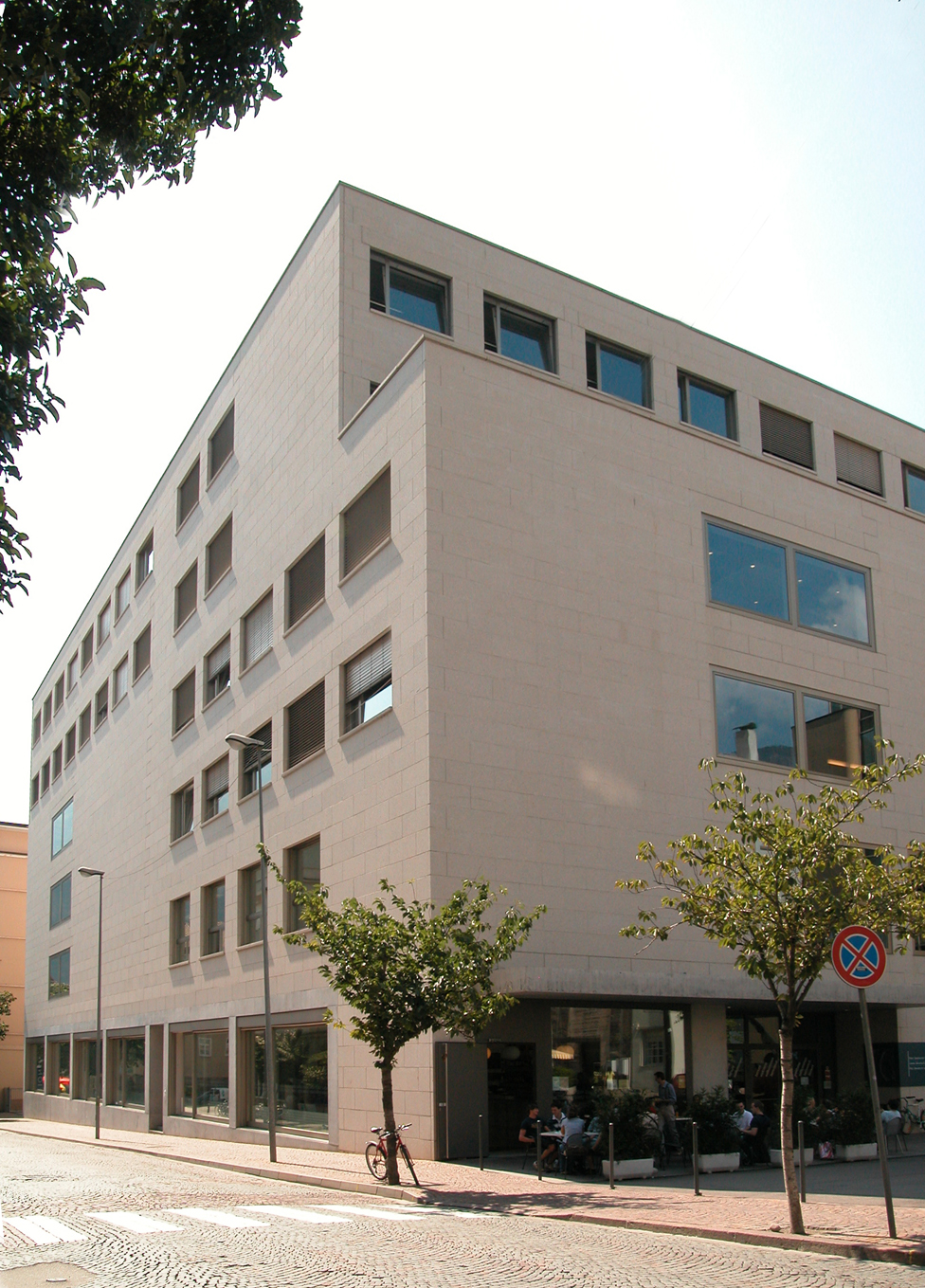
The main building of the Bolzano campus

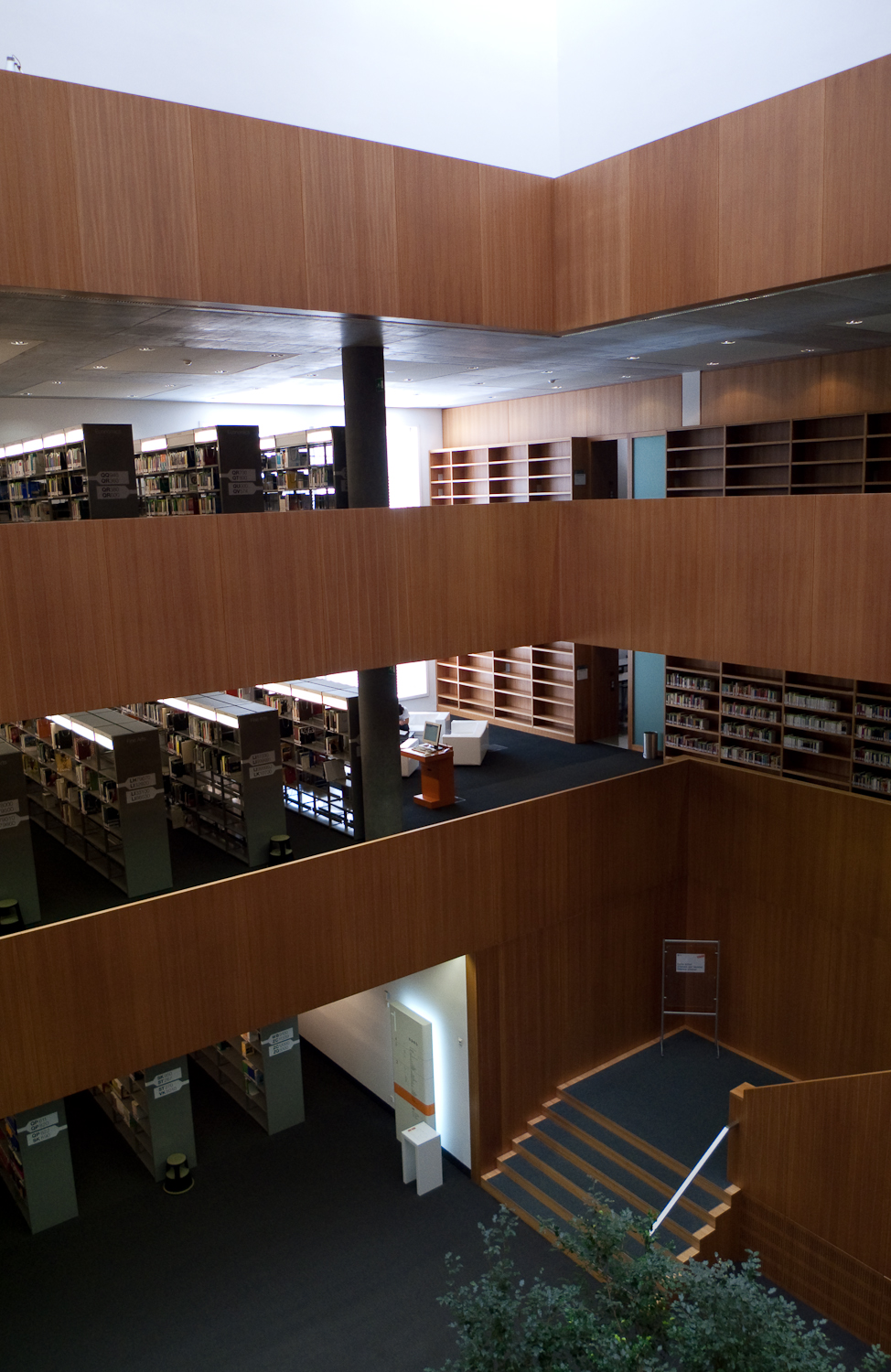
The Library of the Free University of Bozen-Bolzano

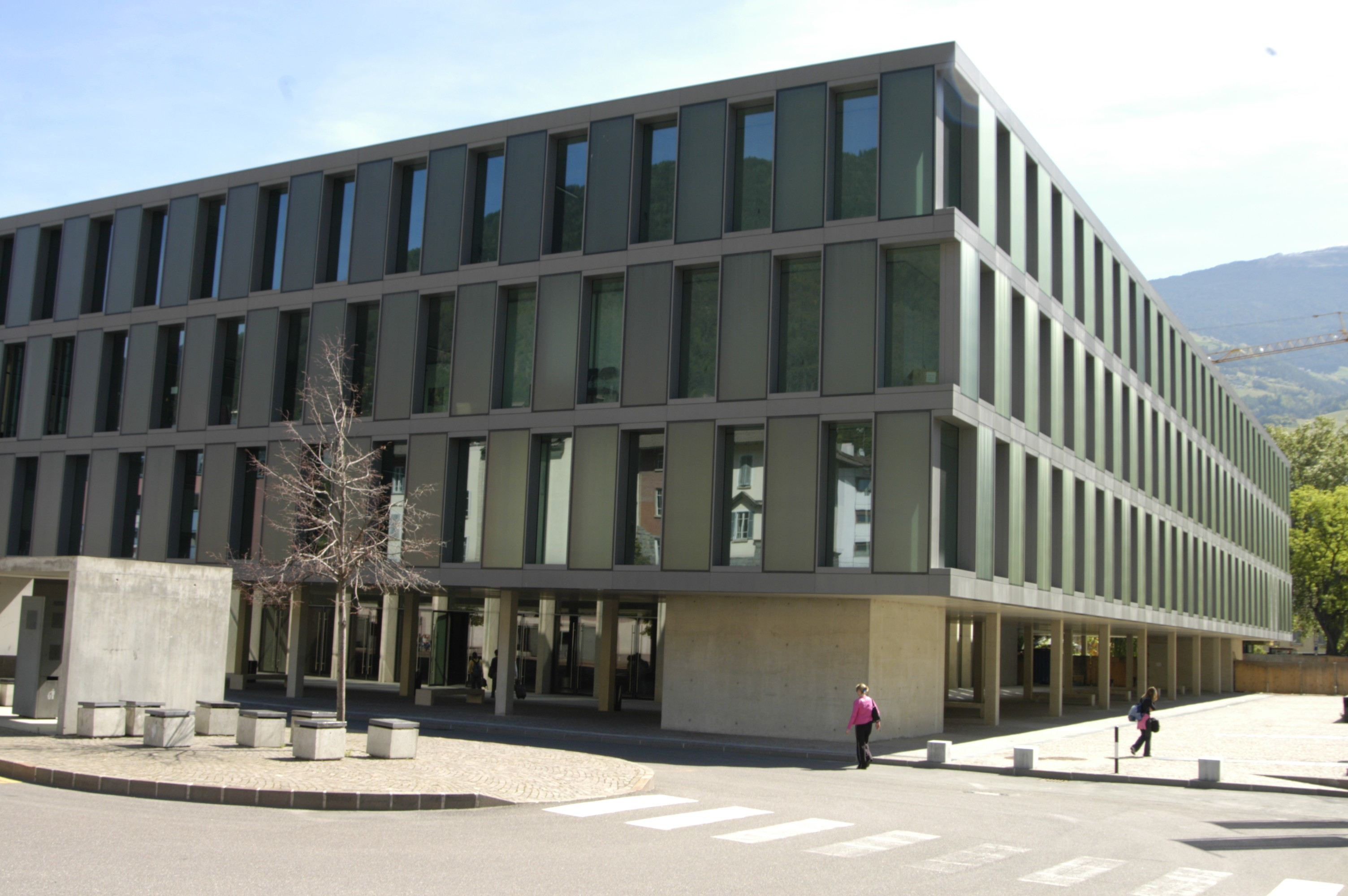
The campus at Brixen

The Free University of Bozen-Bolzano (Italian: Libera Università di Bolzano, German: Freie Universität Bozen, Ladin: Università Liedia de Bulsan) is a university primarily located in Bolzano, South Tyrol, Italy. It was founded on 31 October 1997 and is organized into five faculties with courses taught in German, Italian, and English. The Free University of Bozen-Bolzano regularly achieves top positions in national and international rankings.

== Campus ==
The university has two campuses: in Bolzano and Brixen. The buildings in Bolzano were designed by the architects Matthias Bischoff and Roberto Azzola of Zürich and those in Brixen by Regina Kohlmeyer and Jens Oberst from Stuttgart. The latter won the 9th architecture prize of the city of Oderzo in 2005.

== Rectors ==
Previous rectors of the university were Luxembourg economist Alfred Steinherr (1998 - 2003), Swiss linguist Rita Franceschini (2004 - 2008), and German sociologist Walter Lorenz (2008 - 2016). Italian engineer Paolo Lugli was the rector from 2017 until 2024. Alex Weissensteiner has been since 2024 the rector at the Free University of Bozen-Bolzano. Alex Weissensteiner is a professor of quantitative finance. He completed his doctoral studies at the Leopold-Franzens University of Innsbruck. In the following years, he conducted research and taught at the Universities of Innsbruck and Liechtenstein.

University rankings

Global – Overall
- QS World: =643 (2026)

== Faculties ==
=== Economics and Management ===
The Faculty of Economics and Management is based in Bolzano. It offers four bachelor's, five master's, and three PhD degree programs. The Faculty of Economics and Management is currently ranked 151st-175th among the best 2,800 universities worldwide in the Times Higher Education World University Rankings 2025.

In the 2025 THE World’s Best Small Universities Rankings, Free University of Bozen-Bozano was ranked among the best 10 small universities worldwide.

=== Education ===
The Faculty of Education is based in Brixen and offers three bachelor's, three master's, and one PhD program.

The main research areas of the faculty include:

- Educational and development projects and processes for different age groups and contexts
- Social dynamics, social cohesion, citizenship and solidarity systems
- Languages and communication for a multicultural and multilingual society

=== Engineering ===
The Faculty of Engineering is based in Bolzano and offers five bachelor's, five master's, and three PhD degree programs.

=== Agricultural, Environmental and Food Sciences ===
The Faculty of Agricultural, Environmental and Food Sciences is based in Bolzano and offers two bachelor's, four master's, and two PhD programs.

=== Design and Art ===
The Faculty for Design and Art is based in Bolzano and offers two bachelor's and two master's.

The main research areas of the faculty include:

- Visual culture and its impact on society
- Phenomena, processes and results of three-dimensional projects
- Theories, forms and languages of design, art and visual culture

The faculty also operates a fab lab named Bitz, which is also open to users not affiliated with unibz.

== European Master Programmes ==
The Faculty of Computer Science at the Free University of Bozen-Bolzano is very active in this way and is amongst the research centers recognized by the European Union as a leader in this program. There are two European Master Programmes in the area of computer science running in this university, under Erasmus Mundus Programme:

- European Master Program in Computational Logic
- European Master on Software Engineering

== Studium Generale ==
Since 2011, there has been a multidisciplinary Studium Generale course, which offers a wide range of lectures in fields of general interest.

== Research ==
A total of 917 projects of basic and applied research have been conducted within the university since 1998.

The university has scientific and technological laboratories at each of its sites, at the NOI Techpark, a local technological and innovation hub, and at the Versuchszentrum Laimburg, an agronomy research institute.

== Students activities ==
- The members of the student advisory board are elected every two years, however, between two elections a petition for the representative could be announced. Student representative are members of the University Council, the Academic Senate, the Faculty Council, the Course Council, the Equal Opportunities Committee and the Didactic Joint Committee.
- The South Tyrolean Student association is the most important South Tyrolean association for students. Beside the head office in Bolzano there are seven branch offices in Austria and Italy. The sh.asus was founded in 1955 as a non-profit association. It represents South Tyrolean students studying abroad and students in South Tyrol.
- The M.U.A., Movimento Universitario Altoatesino, is an association which has been recognized by the Autonomous Province of Bozen-Bolzano and has been founded in the 1993. Its principal purposes are "to defend and ease the right to study of the students and the working students of the university" and "to organize conferences, debatings, conventions, cultural, social and university seminar". The association operates in Bolzano and promotes the project WEBZ, "the first web-tv of South-Tyrol made by youngs for youngs."
- Kikero is a cultural association, which has been founded in 2000 and organizes activities such as the debating club and the movie nights. Furthermore, Kikero is also responsible for the university magazine "Kflyer".
- SCUB, Sports Club University Bozen-Bolzano, is the students' association that mainly deals with sports activities and that organizes every year the SNOWDAYS, Europe's biggest wintersport event for students from all over Italy and the EU. SCUB comprises also the UniParty team, which is in charge of organizing university parties for unibz students.
- A further student association is the Bozen – Bolzano local committee AIESEC, which organizes international exchange programmes to permit university students to get in touch with the working world.
- PRO – Students for Business also encourages students to connect with the working environment through the enhancement of economic and business activities.
- The university also has a choir called UnibzVoices, conducted by Prof. Johann Van der Sandt, who teaches "Music and Communication" at the Brixen College of Education.
- The most recent student association is the Alumni Club that comprises graduates of the Free University of Bozen–Bolzano.

== Bibliography ==
- Hans Karl Peterlini & Hannes Obermair (eds), Universitas Est. Essays and documents on the history of education in Tyrol/South-Tyrol, 2 Vol. (Bozen-Bolzano University Press, Raetia Verlag, Bozen/Bolzano 2008), ISBN 978-88-7283-316-2
- Klaus Kempf, Franz Berger, The Library as a Service Point. The Case of the Bozen University Library: Planning, Building, Financing, in "LIBER Quarterly", 10, 2000, pp. 108–116. (Download PDF 52 KB)
- Universitätsreden an der Freien Universität Bozen / Discorsi d'ateneo alla Libera Università di Bolzano / Public Talks at the Free University of Bozen, 6 voll., Bolzano, Bozen-Bolzano University Press, 2005-ss. ISBN (ISSN) 2494716-7
- List of universities in Italy

== See also ==
- Library of the Free University of Bozen-Bolzano
