= Deadbeat (musician) =

Canadian electronica musician

Scott Monteith, better known by his stage name Deadbeat, is a Canadian electronica musician. His music often has a political focus. He uses a laptop to create his music, including live shows. Deadbeat's early albums were created in Montreal, Quebec; he currently works and lives in Berlin.

== Early life ==
Monteith was born in Kitchener, Ontario.

== Career ==
Living and performing in Montreal, Monteith released his first album in 2001; his next album, Wildlife Documentaries, came out a year later. Monteith then began performing with Steve Beaupré in the duo Crackhaus. In 2003, he performed at the Mutek and Sonar festivals.

In 2004, a few months after his marriage, Monteith released a third Deadbeat album, Something Borrowed, Something Blue

In 2005, while Monteith was still living in Montreal, Deadbeat released an album, New World Observer, on Pole's "~scape" label. Pop singer Athésia appeared as a guest vocalist on the album.

In 2006 Monteith moved to Berlin, Germany, and subsequently performed at a number of clubs and festivals.

In 2018, Monteith reached out to Cowboy Junkies to ask if they had any plans to commemorate the 30th anniversary of their breakthrough 1988 album The Trinity Session, which he loves, like they did with Trinity Revisited for its 20th. They told him that they didn't, but would enthusiastically support whatever angle he wanted to run with. Monteith approached musician/producer/fellow Canadian-in-Berlin Fatima Camara about working with him on this project, and she was thrilled to participate. After several meetings, they set up in Berlin's Chez Cherie studio, and made the proceedings reverent to the original by exploring the acoustic properties of the space and minimizing their arrangements to do so. This was also the first project either had done which placed so much emphasis on their singing voices. The end result, released in 2019 on 2LP/CD/download by Constellation, was Deadbeat & Camara's Trinity Thirty, a full cover of the major release of the album. One bit of fun they had was including a cover of Patsy Cline's "Walkin' After Midnight" in their version of the Junkies' original song "I Don't Get It," turning it into "I Don't Get It After Midnight (Medley)."

In 2019, Deadbeat picked his eight favorite cuts from the LNOE back catalog to rework, providing new ‘dub’ interpretations of tracks from Sasha, Hunter/Game, Ejeca, Jody Barr, VONDA7, Alex Niggemann, Jon Gurd and Dubspeeka.

== Albums ==
- Primordia (2001)
- Wild Life Documentaries (2002)
- Something Borrowed, Something Blue (2004)
- New World Observer (2005)
- Journeyman's Annual (2007)
- Roots And Wire (2008)
- Drawn And Quartered (2011)
- Eight (2012)
- Walls And Dimensions (2015)
- Wax Poetic For This Our Great Resolve (2018)
