= Vittorio Tedesco Zammarano =

Vittorio Tedesco Zammarano

Vittorio Tedesco Zammarano (8 June 1890 – 25 August 1959) was an explorer and writer.

== Biography ==
He was born in Paris in 1890 to Italian parents, Ettore Tedesco and Ida D'Ascanio.

After relocating to Rome following his father's death, his mother married Adolfo Zammarano. As a young man Vittorio enrolled in the Accademia Militare di Modena (in Italian) on 5 November 1908, where he graduated on 17 September 1910 with the rank of 1st lieutenant. From there he went on to the 51st Infantry Regiment. After a three-month course for aviator pilots at the Specialist Battalion of the Engineer Corps he was sent to Libya with the 60th Infantry Regiment to fight in the Italo-Turkish War of 1912.

Upon his return to Italy in 1913 he was promoted to lieutenant. At the end of the year he was assigned to the 2nd Infantry Battalion of Libya where he remained until January 1915, at which time he was repatriated to Italy.

His newfound love for Africa was so strong that he requested to be transferred to the Royal Corps of Colonial Somali Troops and was placed at the orders of the Ministry of Colonies in March of the same year. So begins his adventurous career as explorer and big-game hunter, as well as zoologist, geographer, cartographer, hydrographer, meteorologist, anthropologist, writer, film-maker, photographer, and impromptu doctor.

During his stay in the Italian colonies in Africa, he held various government posts, such as:

- Commissioned officer of government troops in civil service.
- Appointed envoy for missions on behalf of the Royal Italian Geographic Society.
- Appointed envoy for missions on behalf of the Ministry of the Colonies.
- Residing Government Officer in Somalia.
- Royal Commercial Agent in Ethiopia.
- Executive Officer for the Italian Political Section of the Italian-English Mission, charged with outlining the borders and defining the treaty for the relinquishment to Italy of what became known as Italian Jubaland.

His most notable geographic discovery was the identification of the final course of the lower Uebi River as a tributary of the Giuba River in Somalia; and while on an expedition in Ethiopia that follows the course of the Blue Nile River to its source [making him the first European to do so] he identified and mapped all the tributaries to its upper basin.

At the time he arrived in the region, only 21 species of mammals were considered native to Somalia. Following his explorations, that number grew to 87. He discovered a genus of blind fish (Uegitglanis zammaranoi), a species of chiropteran (Petalia parisii), a species of murid (Taterillus zammaranoi), a subspecies of viverra (Genetta dongolana tedescoi) and a subspecies of cercopithecus (Cercopithecus albogularis zammaranoi).

In 1917 he was ordered back to Italy due to World War I, and sent to the battlefront where he fought on the Carso, and in the Battle of the Piave River. For his acts of heroism, he received two Silver Medals and two Bronze Medals for Military Valor, two Crosses of War for Military Valor, and two Distinguished Crosses of War. After a short respite following the end of the war, he returned to Africa in 1919.

Tedesco Zammarano regularly donated live animals to the Rome Zoo, visiting them often and even surprising the zoo's visitors by joining the lions in their cage. He also donated many of his hunting trophies for research purposes to the Museum of Natural History in Rome and to the Civic Museum of Natural History in Milan, prompting the city of Milan to honor him with the Grand Gold Medal of Merit in April 1924.

He returned permanently to Rome in November 1925 with his first son, Amedeo, born in Garbatula, Kenya, and with two domesticated cheetah cubs, named Sabatino and Pimpinella, who lived the rest of their lives with him as beloved pets and companions.

In 1931 he received a Gold Medal at the International Colonial Exposition in Paris for his cartography work during his African itineraries.

The rest of his life was dedicated to writing books, treatises for various government organizations, scientific and hunting articles. He also completed his second (Il Rifugio delle Pleiadi) and third (Il Sentiero delle Belve) movies on Africa, his first being Hic Sunt Leones which was released in 1922.

He died in Rome on 25 August 1959.

== Publications ==
- Impressioni di Caccia in Somalia (1920)
- Alle Sorgenti del Nilo Azzurro (1922)
- Esplorazione del Basso Uebi (1923)
- Hic Sunt Leones (1923)
- Auhertzee Mio Sogno (1925) – (Novel; re-published as Auher Mio Sogno in 1935)
- Il Sentiero delle Belve (1929)
- Le Colonie Italiane: Fauna e Caccia (1930)
- Azanago’ non Pianse (1934) – (Novel)
- Cuoresaldo a Caccia Grossa (1934) – (For Children)
- Carovane (1955)
- Anche I Giganti S’Inginocchiano (1958)

== Movies ==
- Hic Sunt Leones (1922)
- Il Rifugio delle Pleiadi (1926)
- Il Sentiero delle Belve (1932)
