= Valeria De Antonellis =

Italian professor of computer science and engineering

Valeria De Antonellis is Professor Emeritus at University of Brescia, Italy, since February 2021. Previously she was a professor of computer science and engineering at University of Brescia, Italy, where she led the research group on "Databases, Information Systems and Web" at Department of Information Engineering.

== Academic career ==
She is an Italian computer scientist and has done extensive research on conceptual modeling, database and information system design. Research interests include Semantic Web: Data, Services and Applications; Big and Open Data exploration in Web Oriented Architecture.

She authored of over 200 papers on computer science related topics. She has been working within several European and National research projects, coordinating parts of or whole projects.

In particular, she led the DATAID research project originating the DATAID-1 methodology for the analysis, design and realization of database systems.

At University of Brescia she was Rector's Delegate for both ICT and University Library System (2010-2016). She was Head of the PhD program in "Information Engineering" (2000-2006) and led its transformation into the PhD Program in "Computer Science, Engineering and Systems Control" (2007-2011).
