= Giovanni Antonelli (archivist) =

Italian archivist, historian (1919–2009)

- Born: 27 January 1919
- Died: 27 May 2009 (aged 90)
- Occupations: archivist, historian, politician

Giovanni Antonelli (Spoleto, 27 January 1919 – Spoleto, 27 May 2009) was an Italian archivist, historian and politician.

== Biography ==
Having graduated as an archivist, in 1950 Antonelli entered the archive administration, serving first at the State Archives of Florence, then Pistoia, Terni and finally in the Central Office of the State Archives (Italy), until becoming general director in 1976.

Antonelli worked as secretary of the Superior Council of Archives and, from 1968 to 1976, of the International Council of Archives. He was appointed an honorary member of the Conseil International des Archives, of the Regional Branch of the Islamic area of the Conseil International and an effective member of the Committee of Historical, Philosophical and Philological Sciences of the National Research Council.

Antonelli was awarded the Lex Spoletina prize in 2002.

Antonelli was the director of the Italian Center for studies on the early Middle Ages in Spoleto from 1952 to 1987, director of the art, history and culture magazine he founded Spoletium from 1953 to 2003, and president of the Deputation of Homeland History for Umbria from 1984 to 1996.

Antonelli served as Municipal Councilor of Spoleto in the Christian Democratic Party and was proposed as president of the committee for the festival dei Due Mondi by Gian Carlo Menotti.
