= Athésia =

Canadian dance musician

Athésia (born in Montreal, Quebec) is a Canadian pop singer who writes and performs songs in French, English, Créole and Portuguese. She has performed in Argentina, Brazil, Peru, China, Hong Kong, Paris and New York.

After a number of years performing with house music DJs in Montreal, she released her debut album Nostalgia in 2004. The album is a mixture of fado, tango, bossa nova and tzigane ambiance with a touch of electronic music.

She was also a guest vocalist on Deadbeat's 2005 album New World Observer.

In 2010, she did a South American concert tour. In Buenos Aires, Argentina, as part of the country's celebration of International Francophonie Day, she was the highlight of those who performed there. Buenos Aires newspaper, Página 12, reported that Athésia's presence was considered important for raising awareness of Haiti's plight after the earthquake. Athésia's parents are Haitian. In Brasilia, Brazil, also part of Francophonie celebrations, she put on a fund-raising concert for Haiti relief.

In Peru's Francophonie festival, the Government of Canada led in organizing the events. The embassies of Belgium, France, Greece, Morocco, Rumania and Switzerland worked together with their Canadian counterpart. Athésia and the Gentlemen gave a concert at the Pontifical Catholic University of Peru's cultural centre where she performed songs in French, English, Créole and Portuguese.

In 2011, Radio-Canada broadcast Stanley Pean's interview, in French, with Athésia.
