= Ivo Barnabò Micheli =

Italian screenwriter and film director

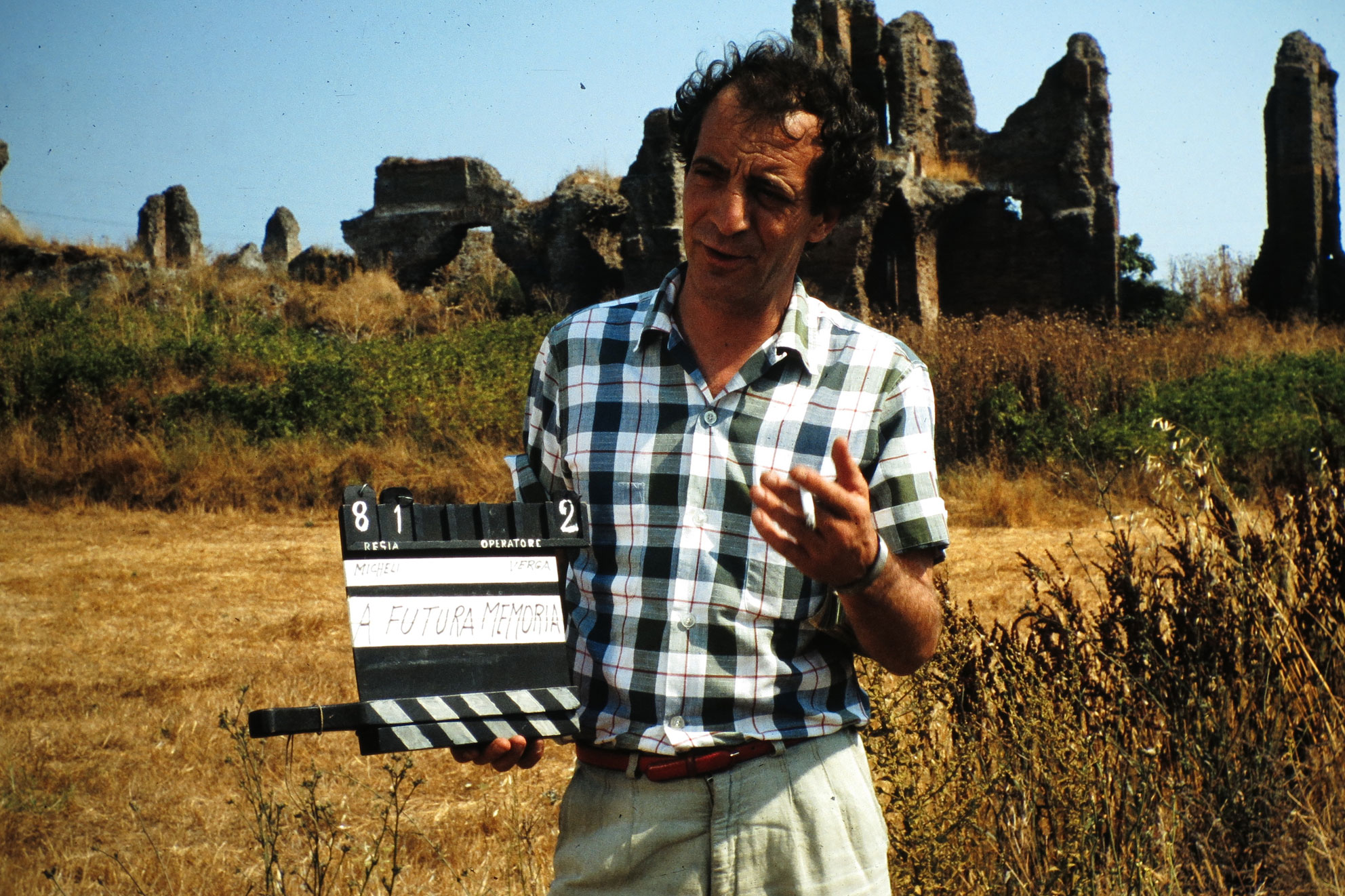
- Born: 29 January 1942; Bruneck, Italy
- Died: 20 July 2005 (aged 63); Bruneck, Italy
- Occupation(s): Film director, screenwriter

Ivo Barnabò Micheli (29 January 1942 – 20 July 2005) was an Italian Film director and screenwriter from the German-speaking South Tyrol / Alto Adige region.

== Filmography (selection) ==
- 1970: La memoria di Kunz
- 1971: I corvi / Die Raben
- 1972: Cesare Zavattini: „Sprechen wir viel von mir“
- 1977: Heinrich Böll
- 1978: Eritrea
- 1984: Eingeklemmt. Notizen für einen Film über Norbert C. Kaser
- 1985: Il lungo inverno / Lange Wintertage
- 1985: A futura memoria: Pier Paolo Pasolini / Annäherung an einen Freibeuter
- 1988: Roberto Rossellini: I giorni dell'avventura / Tage der Abenteuer
- 1989: „Eppur si muove!“ / „Und sie bewegt sich doch!“ Der Prozess Galileo Galilei
- 1992: Im Visier: Die letzten Tage der Menschheit. Ein Film über Karl Kraus, den Krieg und die Journalisten
- 1996: Timbuktu oder Der Traum von einem Ziel
- 1997: Mila 23. C'era una volta il Danubio / Es war einmal die Donau
- 2001: Grenzen
- 2001: George Tabori: Mein Kampf. Filmnotizen zum gleichnamigen Bühnenstück
