= Antonella Ponce =

Ecuadorian musician

Antonella Maria Ponce Cabrera (born August 4, 1997) is an Ecuadorian musician, singer, songwriter and actress.

Very early in life she showed her love for music, and at the age of two she was already singing in tune with family choirs. She studied singing, dancing, and acting at Arte'n 3, an academy of artistic studies in Ecuador. While there, she worked with nationally and internationally known artists such as Riccardo Perotti, Gabriela Villalba ex- Kiruba.

Musician Ricardo Williams, who was looking for a female child's voice to sing with him, featured Ponce on his CD. She also performed with him during the concerts he held after the release of his book and CD, Canción de Cuna para despertar a Papá.

Ponce made her television debut in 2005 on Teleamazonas, which held the exclusive franchise for Club Disney - Ecuador. She worked for almost 4 years as an actress and anchor for Club Disney, where she developed her passion for acting. Because of her discipline and talent, Ponce was considered the main presenter and actress on the show.

In 2007 her musical education took another direction. She was given a test by the director of the Instituto de Música Contemporánea (IMC, Institute of Contemporary Music) of the Universidad San Francisco de Quito, part of the Berklee International Network associated with the Berklee College of Music. The test showed that Ponce had perfect pitch. She began to study at the IMC at the early age of ten, being one of the youngest students at the university. Ponce has performed among university students, impressing the audience with her quality and distinctive confidence. With these studies she developed a new sense for music, and she began to write her own music and lyrics. She has participated several times in the Intercollegiate Musical Festival at the Colegio Menor San Francisco de Quito, where three times she was the only musician singing her own songs. She plays the piano and the flute, and was a member of the Colegio Menor school band. She also taught herself to play the guitar. Ponce has written a variety of songs, with an innovative approach to music. Her abilities are not limited to any particular genre or style; her range allows her to perform jazz, pop, and rock.
