= Louis Antonelli =

American filmmaker and poet (born 1962)

- Born: July 28, 1962 (age 64); Chicago, Illinois
- Occupations: Filmmaker; poet

Louis Antonelli (born July 28, 1962 in Chicago, Illinois) is a filmmaker and poet.

== Biography ==
Louis Antonelli's professional career began in 1980, with the theatrical release of his short film, "The Game". His feature film debut was in 1994 with, "Last Day in Chicago". His films have been official selections at film festivals including, The Chicago International Film Festival (1992, 1993(2), 1994(2), 2008) WorldFEST Houston (1993) The San Francisco Film Festival (1992) The Berlin Film Festival (1992) The Venice Film Festival (1991) and the Cannes Film Festival (1995) Louis Antonelli has won industry honors, including The Chicago International Film Festival (1992, 1993, 1994 x 2, 1995, 2008) MarCom Creative Award (2005) The Videography Awards (2005, 2006, 2007, 2008) and two Silver TELLY Awards (1992, 2005) Louis Antonelli is a two time EMMY nominee (1993, 1997.) His most recent studio release was with Universal Pictures/UMe and Paul Stanley. Their feature, One Live KISS, debuted in 2008 and was awarded a Gold Classic TELLY award in 2009. Louis Antonelli's poetry has been published exclusively by VIA, Voices in Italian America beginning in 1990. His written works have been awarded POET/1990 by World Poetry, San Francisco, Ca. (1990) and Outstanding Writer of America; National Library, LOC. (1994)

Louis Antonelli, in association with Ida Lupino, The Estate of Ida Lupino, Mary Ann Anderson, The Library of Congress, and The Roan Group restored (with Ida Lupino's approval and consent) Ms. Lupino's film, "The Hitch-Hiker" (1953). The restoration took place in Washington, D.C., Alexandria, Virginia, Chicago, Illinois, and Hollywood, California, beginning 1994, and completed late 1996. The film was first reissued in its restored version internationally in 1997. In 1998 the film was inducted into The National Film Registry as, "culturally and historically significant" for permanent archival preservation, joining such motion pictures previously inducted into the registry such as, "Citizen Kane" (1941), "Raging Bull" (1981), and "2001: A Space Odyessy" (1969).

== Further viewing ==
- Antonelli, Louis, Stanley Paul (2008) One Live KISS Universal Pictures, UMe, New Door. OCLC 276881426

Antonelli, Louis, (2018) Fifty Eight Veils to Obscure Who She is, and Her Tears. The Filmakers/2 TM. https://vimeo.com/278841325

Antonelli, Louis, (2017) Secrets From a Brief Ecstasy. Quadrama Film, LLC. https://vimeo.com/278838441

Antonelli, Louis, (1994) The Wizard of Austin Boulevard. Grand Cinema Ltd. https://vimeo.com/114021751

Antonelli, Louis, (1994) Last Day in Chicago. Grand Cinema Ltd, https://vimeo.com/114045113 https://vimeo.com/114115127

Antonelli, Louis, (1990) A Place For Us. Antonelli Film Ltd. https://vimeo.com/114634903 https://vimeo.com/114147695

Antonelli, Louis, (1992) it takes a lot of light to make a city. Grand Cinema Ltd. https://vimeo.com/114636323

Antonelli, Louis, (1990) In the Shadows. Egg Production, Inc. https://vimeo.com/157392388

Antonelli, Louis, (1991) Time Was. Grand Cinema, Ltd. https://vimeo.com/114741385

Antonelli, Louis, (1991) Susie's Windows. Antonelli Film Ltd. https://vimeo.com/114736985

Antonelli, Louis, Hoge, Jeffrey (1993) Sour Angelica. Hannibal Harbinger, LCC. https://vimeo.com/114645434

Antonelli, Louis, (1982) Midnight Movie. Green Core Inc. https://vimeo.com/115271253

Antonelli, Louis, (1981) The Game. Antonelli Film Ltd. https://vimeo.com/114851883

Antonelli, Louis, (2008) One Live KISS. Universal Pictures, UMe, New Door, Quadrama/FILM, Paul Stanley Music, Ltd.http://vimeo.com/115515123http://vimeo.com/115260084 https://vimeo.com/115263907
