= Matteo Papetti =

Italian film director and screenwriter

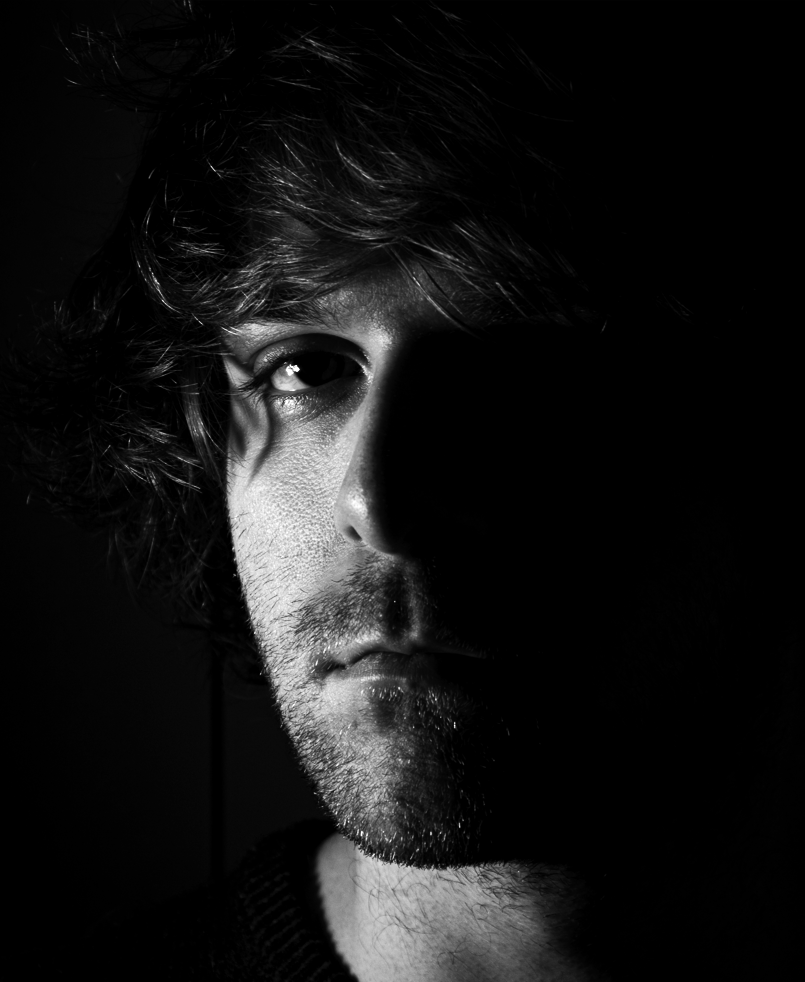
- Matteo Papetti
- Citizenship: Italian
- Education: LABA Brescia
- Occupations: Film director, screenwriter
- Years active: 2022–present

Matteo Papetti (born 31 March 1998) is an Italian film director and screenwriter. He directed the short films Dear Brother (2022) and ResoNumero0051 (2023). ResoNumero0051 was one of the winning works of the 2023 Bookciak, Azione! competition, whose award ceremony was held as a pre-opening event of Giornate degli Autori during the 80th Venice International Film Festival.

== Career ==
Papetti developed an interest in cinema while attending a technical secondary school, where he studied mechanics. He later attended the Cinema and Audiovisual course at the Libera Accademia di Belle Arti (LABA) in Brescia.

In 2022, Papetti directed and served as cinematographer on the self-produced short film Dear Brother. The film received awards at several international film competitions, including a cinematography prize at the Tokyo Film Awards, Best Foreign Short at the San Diego Movie Awards and an Outstanding Achievement recognition in the Best Short Film category at the 4th Dimension Independent Film Festival.

In 2023, Papetti directed and co-wrote ResoNumero0051, a short film freely inspired by Davide Passoni's graphic novel Isometria della memoria. The film was developed as a curricular project by students in LABA's Multimedia Dramaturgy course, coordinated by Alessandra Pescetta. It was selected as one of the winning works of the twelfth edition of Bookciak, Azione! The winning films were presented at the Lido of Venice on 29 August 2023 during the Bookciak, Azione! event preceding Giornate degli Autori.

Papetti later worked as assistant director and production manager on Claudio Recenti's short film A Bed Story. The film was shortlisted for the 2026 Sony Future Filmmaker Awards.

== Selected filmography ==
Year	Title	Role	Ref.
2022	Dear Brother	Director, cinematographer	
2023	ResoNumero0051	Director, co-writer	

== Awards and recognition ==
Year	Work	Festival or award	Category	Result	Ref.
2022	Dear Brother	Tokyo Film Awards	Cinematography	Won	
2022	Dear Brother	San Diego Movie Awards	Best Foreign Short	Won	
2022	Dear Brother	4th Dimension Independent Film Festival	Best Short Film	Outstanding Achievement	
2023	ResoNumero0051	Bookciak, Azione!	Main competition	Won	
