= Marco Di Tillo =

Marco Di Tillo was born in Rome in 1951. He is married and has three sons. He graduated in Psychology and is a Radio and TV personality, film director, novelist, historical fiction, comic strips, adventure books and fairy tales.

== Biography ==
He frequented Cineclub Roma with Nanni Moretti and Andrea Garibaldi. He started working for Radio Rai. He wrote Amore vuol dire together with Nanni Loy and Annabella Cerliani, Che giorno era quel giorno? together with Massimo Guglielmi, Il Guastafeste with Massimo Giuliani and Un'invenzione chiamata disco with Marco Ferrante.

He wrote the telefilm Cercai l'amor (Italian Rai). In 1983, he started to work for TV programs like Forte Fortissimo with Piero Chiambretti and Corinne Cléry, Il sabato dello Zecchino with Topo Gigio, Spazio Aperto, Bellezza e dintorni, Regali di Natale, Ciao Italia with Sydne Rome and Maria Teresa Ruta, Una giornata frizzante with Nino Manfredi, Pomeriggio sul Due with Giulia Fossà, Scrupoli with Enza Sampò.

In 1988, he directed the thriller for children Operazione Pappagallo (Operation Parrot), written with Piero Chiambretti and Claudio Delle Fratte and interpreted by Leo Gullotta, Nicola Pistoia, Siusy Blady, Tiberio Murgia, Didi Perego, Carlotta Leonori.

He wrote the novels for young readersIl giovane cavaliere, Tre ragazzi ed il Sultano, "Il ladro di Picasso", "Due ragazzi nella Firenze dei Medici",Mamma Natale, Mamma Natale ed i Pirati and the travel books Rome for two and Walkin' Rome.

In 2000, he wrote and directed the comedy movie Un anno in campagna (One year in the Countryside) starring Francesca Antonelli, Yari Gugliucci, Giulio Di Mauro, Enzo Cardogna, Ludovica Modugno.

He wrote also texts to comics, such as I grandi del calcio (Football Stars), I grandi del jazz (Jazz Stars), I grandi del cinema (Movie Stars), Yeti (strip), Piero (strip), Hans & Chica (adventure). He wrote italian detective books as " Destini di sangue ", " Dodici Giugno ", "Il palazzo del freddo", "Tutte le strade portano a Genova", "Omicidio all'Acquario di Genova". He published in Us the historical thriller "The other Eisenhower" (Webster House Publishing) written with the American partner Augustine Campana.
