= Antonelli Bros Ltd =

English ice cream manufacturer

Antonelli Bros Ltd are a manufacturer of ice cream cones and wafers, based in Eccles, Greater Manchester.

== History ==
Company founder, Domenico Antonelli was born in Picinisco, Lazio, Italy. After moving to the UK, he started to manufacture ice cream cones and wafers in 1912. Working with his sons Ernest, Luigi and Romolo, the company was known as The International Wafer Company, located at Bridgewater Street, Salford and Ayres Road Old Trafford.

In 1924 the Company started to focus more on the production of biscuits and subsequently changed its name to "International Biscuit Co. Ltd". The biscuit ovens were used to produce 'Iron rations' for the military during WWII when wafer production was banned. Post-war business boomed and in 1961, Romolo's sons Ernest, Roland and Victor opened the bakery in Eccles specialising in biscuits for the ice cream trade. On the retirement of Ernest and Victor, Roland took control and in the early 1990s, his sons Mark and David joined the business which they still run today, although Roland remains chairman.
