= Peter L. Antonelli =

American mathematician (1941–2020)

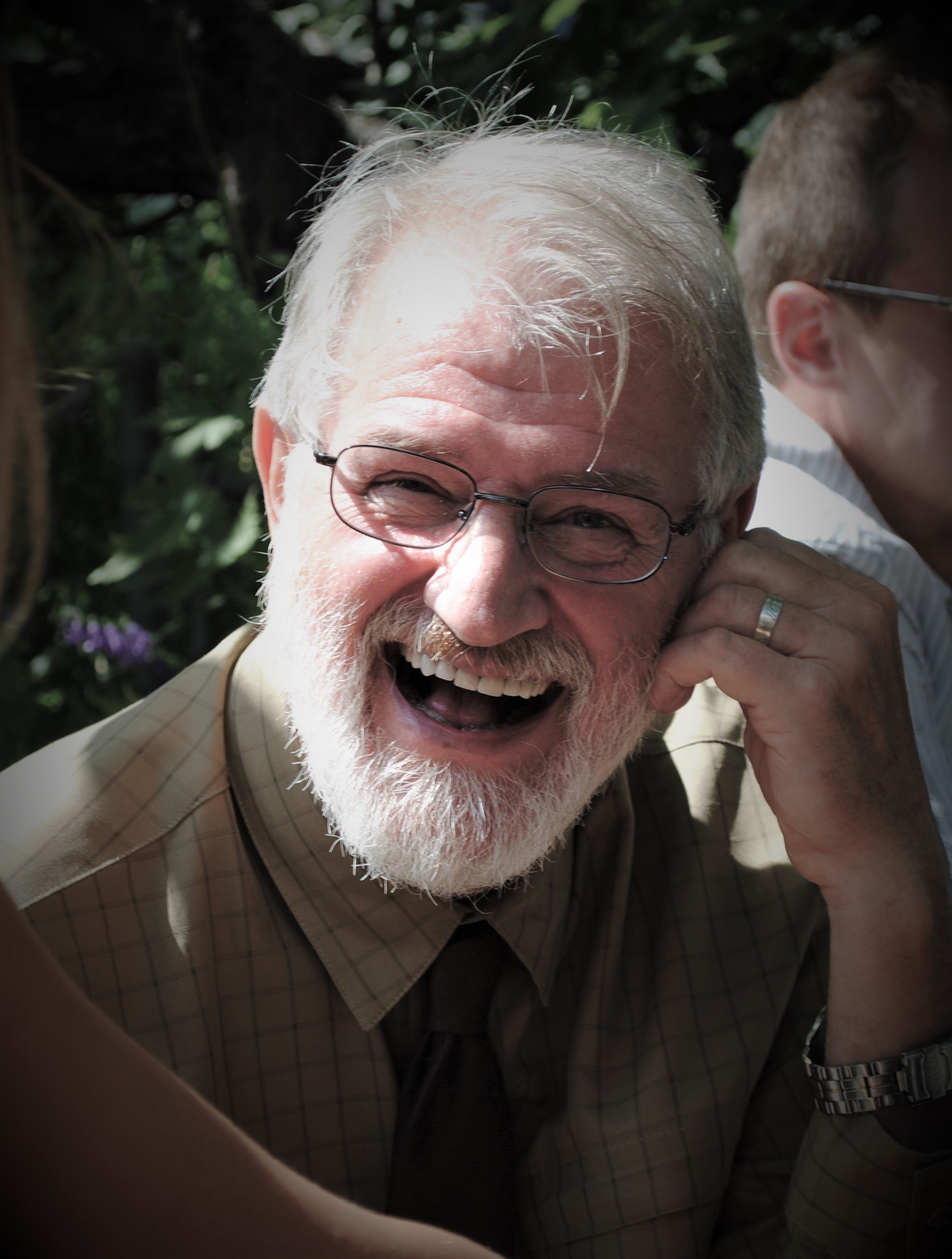
Photo of Peter L. Antonelli (American mathematician) in Edmonton, Alberta, Canada (August. 2010)

Peter Louis Antonelli (March 5, 1941 – February 15, 2020) was an American mathematician known for his work on mathematical biology, Finsler geometry, and their connections.

== Overview ==
Antonelli was born on March 5, 1941, in Syracuse, New York, and became a student at Syracuse University, graduating in 1963. He completed a PhD at Syracuse University, with the 1966 dissertation Structure Theory for Montgomery-Samelson Fiberings Between Manifolds supervised by Erik Hemmingsen.

After a short period as assistant professor at the University of Tennessee, Knoxville from 1967 to 1968, and an NSF post-doctoral fellowship at the Institute for Advanced Study in Princeton, New Jersey, from 1968 to 1970, he took a faculty position at the University of Alberta, Canada, where he stayed for the remainder of his career. In 2006, he moved to Brazil with his wife and colleague S.F. Rutz, where he was a visiting professor at Federal University of Pernambuco, Recife.

He died in 2020.

== Contributions to mathematics ==
In his early years, Peter L. Antonelli's interests were focused on physics, especially general relativity. As a Ph.D. student, he studied mathematical objects such as special groups of diffeomorphisms and exotic spheres. After 1970, his interests shifted towards applied mathematics, especially applications of differential geometry to developmental biology, ecology, and genetics. As a visiting professor in the biology department at the University of Sussex in the early 1970s, he pursued interests that had developed from his work in the early 1960s as a United States Public Health Service Fellow in mathematical biology at the University of Chicago.

During the course of his career, Peter L. Antonelli published over 120 research papers in a variety of domains including non-linear mechanics, Hamiltonian systems, diffusion theory, stochastic calculus and stochastic geometry, geometric probability, differential game theory, bifurcation theory, geometry of paths, and Riemannian, Finslerian and Lagrangian geometries. The geometry of certain non-Riemannian metrics now bear his name. Along with his extensive work on the mathematical ecology of the Great Barrier Reef, he also showed that all living plants and animals are likely derived from two primitive species of bacteria, through the process of endosymbiosis.

== Books ==
Antonelli was the coauthor of books including:

- Antonelli, Peter L.; Burghelea, Dan; Kahn, Peter J. (1971). The Concordance-Homotopy Groups of Geometric Automorphism Groups. Lecture Notes in Mathematics. Vol. 215. Berlin & New York: Springer-Verlag. doi:10.1007/BFb0061176. ISBN 978-3-540-05560-0.
- Antonelli, P. L.; Ingarden, R. S.; Matsumoto, M. (1993). The theory of sprays and Finsler spaces with applications in physics and biology. Fundamental Theories of Physics. Vol. 58. Dordrecht: Kluwer Academic Publishers. doi:10.1007/978-94-015-8194-3. ISBN 0-7923-2577-X.
- Antonelli, P. L.; Bradbury, R. H. (1996). Volterra–Hamilton models in the ecology and evolution of colonial organisms. Singapore: World Scientific Publishing. ISBN 981-02-2450-8.
- Antonelli, P. L.; Zastawniak, T. J. (1999). Fundamentals of Finslerian diffusion with applications. Fundamental Theories of Physics. Vol. 101. Dordrecht: Kluwer Academic Publishers. doi:10.1007/978-94-011-4824-5. ISBN 0-7923-5511-3.

His edited volumes include:

- Antonelli, P. L., ed. (1985). Mathematical essays on growth and the emergence of form. University of Alberta Press.
- Antonelli, P. L., ed. (2000). Finslerian geometries: a meeting of minds. Fundamental Theories of Physics. Vol. 109. Dordrecht: Kluwer Academic Publishers. ISBN 0-7923-6115-6.
- Antonelli, P. L., ed. (2003). Handbook of Finsler geometry, Vols. I & II. Dordrecht: Kluwer Academic Publishers. doi:10.1007/978-94-007-0942-3 (inactive 1 July 2025). ISBN 1-4020-1557-7. MR 2067663.

== Recognition ==
In 1987, Antonelli was awarded a McCalla Professorship at the University of Alberta for research excellence. In 2001, he was awarded the degree of Honorary Professor from Alexandru Ioan Cuza University in Romania. Papers from a conference held there in honor of his 60th birthday were later published as a festschrift.
