= South Tyrolean Student association =

The South Tyrolean student association (German: Südtiroler HochschülerInnenschaft, Italian: associazione universitaria sudtirolese, Ladin: lia di studenc dl’universitè de südtirol) is the most important South Tyrolean association for students. The South Tyrolean student association is in particular special, as this association is not dependent on one place but has different offices in big university cities, mainly 1 head office in Bolzano and 7 branch offices, 4 of them in Austria and 3 in Italy. The sh.asus was founded in 1955 as a non-profit association. The most important function lies in the union representation of interest of the South Tyrolean students and the students who are studying in South Tyrol.

== Functions of the sh.asus ==
The sh.asus is defined as an interethnic association. The most important function of the sh.asus is the representation of interests of the students in social and cultural concerns. The sh.asus takes stands, regarding cultural, social, political issues and after all in matters of educational policy. The sh.asus is therefore present in the public and gives inputs for new ideas or improvements. Furthermore, the sh.asus organizes cultural events and it is an important office for advice regarding studying and universities.

== Structure ==
The association with the head office in Bolzano and the 7 branch offices are controlled by a committee, which is composed of the committees of the 7 branch offices. The head committee elects the president, who afterwards nominates speakers for the different areas where the sh.asus acts (i.e. cultural, political or social area).

=== Head office in Bolzano ===
The head office of the sh.asus is placed in Bolzano. There, 4 employees are working for the interests of more or less 15.000 students. The most important part of their working time is invested in advises for the students. All those who finish their high school have the possibility to be informed by the sh.asus regarding further studies and universities. A very important part of the advice is the online-application of the province for a student grant; nearly 1000 students come every year to the office to complete the request. Furthermore, the office in Bolzano offers also a gratis psychological advice for students.

=== Branch offices ===
The main part of the life in the association takes part in the branch offices. Beside Bolzano there exist 7 branch offices in Innsbruck, Graz, Salzburg, Vienna, Bologna, Padova and Trento. The branch offices offer lodging options and organize cultural events, as well as sport and fun events. Every student has the possibility to participate these events and also to introduce his own ideas and suggestions.

== Members ==
Every person, who accepts the statutes of the sh.asus can become a member of it. The membership is open for all people, independent of their culture, language etc. However, only students have the passive right to vote. Currently, the sh.asus has more than 1000 members.

== Political activity ==
The aspects and issues collected during the advises are put into practice in the political activity. The sh.asus is part of the political committee for university education in South Tyrol and has a right of co-determination. Under constant communication with the politicians, the sh.asus tries to improve everything around university studies. Traditional it is very important for the sh.asus to improve the Italian recognition of university degrees acquired in Austria.

== Cultural activity ==
The third main point of the sh.asus is the cultural activity: At least two times a year, they publish the “Skolast”. The “Skolast” is a magazine, which was founded in 1956 and is therefore one of the oldest multilingual publications of South Tyrol. The idea of a magazine was realized after all by Rainer Seberich and Franz von Walther, and is nowadays one of the most popular projects of the sh.asus. The topics are chosen according to actual issues and problems of the students.

== History ==
The sh.asus was founded in 1955 and has passed through a very moved but after all successful development since then. In the 50s the sh.asus tried to improve the working possibilities in Italy for students who completed their study in Austria. Furthermore, the founders of the sh.asus published the first “Skolast” and started with professional advises for students. In the 60s the sh.asus had to fight with political problems regarding the goals of their organization. Finally the sh.asus was divorces in two parties and the idea of a united student organization was at the risk to fail.

The “studentproblem” was a big issue also in the 70s and the sh.asus veered away in its opinion from the SVP (South Tyrol’s biggest political party). Furthermore, the sh.asus opened the organization for the Italian language students.

In the 80s the situation between the SVP and the sh.asus improved a lot. However the student association had again big problems; In the 90s the committee of the sh.asus took the South Tyrolean publishing house “Athesia” to court, as they had published some false facts about the financial situation of the sh.asus. Finally the sh.asus succeeded in overcoming the problems and is nowadays the most important South Tyrolean association for students.
