= Antonella De Santo =

Italian and British Professor of Experimental Physics

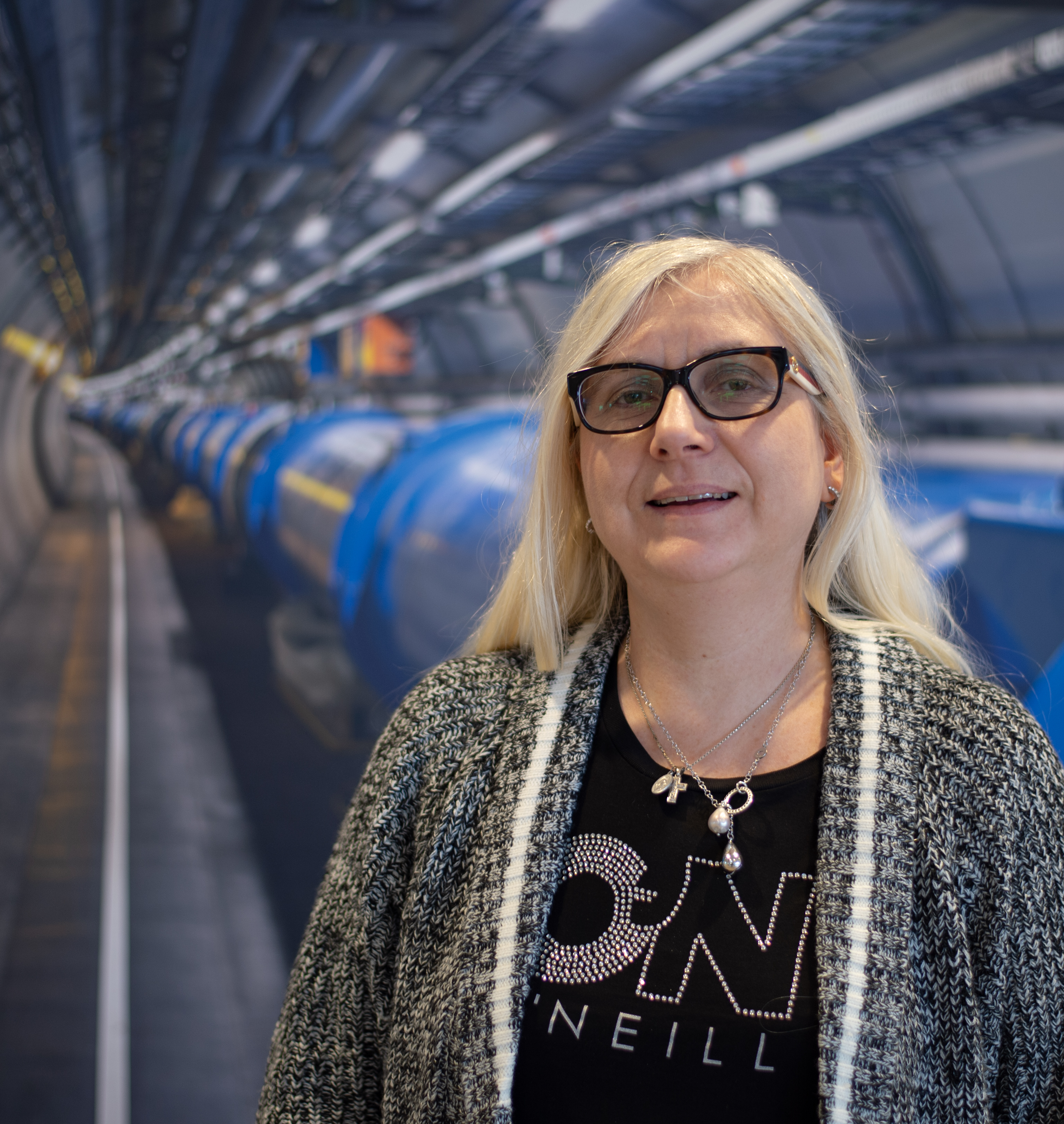
- Professor Antonella De Santo at CERN in 2019
- Education: University of Pisa
- Scientific career
- Fields: Particle Physics
- Workplaces: CERN University of Oxford; Royal Holloway University University of Sussex

Antonella De Santo is an Italian and British Professor of Experimental Physics and works on the ATLAS experiment. She was the first woman in the Department of Physics at the University of Sussex to be made a professor.

== Early life and education ==
De Santo graduated cum laude from the University of Pisa in 1993. She remained there for her graduate studies, earning her PhD in 1997. Whilst she was a PhD student she witnessed the discovery of neutrino oscillations.

== Research ==
De Santo was awarded a research fellowship in the experimental physics division of CERN. She joined the University of Oxford, working with Alfons Weber, as a postdoctoral research fellow in 2000. At Oxford, De Santo studied neutrino physics. In 2003 De Santo joined Royal Holloway, University of London as a lecturer. She was coordinator for the ATLAS experiment-UK supersymmetry group and led the working group looking for three leptons in the excited state.

She was appointed an associate professor at the University of Sussex in 2009. She founded the Sussex team working on the Large Hadron Collider. She is searching for evidence of supersymmetry in proton-proton interactions. She is interested in luminosity upgrades at the ATLAS experiment.

In 2013 she became the University of Sussex's first woman professor in the department of physics. She was the Head of Experimental Particle Physics at the University of Sussex between 2011 and 2017. She was awarded a Science and Technology Facilities Council consolidator grant in 2012 and 2015 that allowed her to work on the ATLAS experiment. She teaches the advanced particle physics course. In 2016 she arranged the annual meeting of the Institute of Physics High Energy Particle Physics group at the University of Sussex.

In 2017 she was awarded a Royal Society Wolfson Research Merit Award allowing her to search for physics beyond the Standard Model. She was a member of the ATLAS experiment Speakers Committee and of the ATLAS Publication Committee.

=== Public engagement ===
De Santo launched the annual University of Sussex particle physics masterclasses for school students. She has presented her work at several Royal Society Summer Exhibitions. The Sussex SUSY Softies, a series of knitted particles that explained the main features of neutralinos, were one of the most popular aspects of the 2014 exhibition. Between 2017 and 2020, she was a governor of Cardinal Newman Catholic School, Hove. She collaborated with the artists Joe Gerhardt and Ruth Jarman to create a work of art, HALO, that incorporated the results of CERN's particle collisions. It was commissioned by Audemars Piguet for Art Basel.
