= Antonello da Caserta =

Italian composer

Antonello da Caserta, also Anthonello de Casetta, Antonellus Marot, was an Italian composer of the medieval era, active in the late 14th and early 15th centuries.

== Life and career ==
Essentially nothing is known of Antonello's life. Earlier in the 20th century, Nino Pirrotta thought Caserta was a Neapolitan composer, but because most of his surviving works are in northern Italian manuscripts, this is now doubted (Günther and Stone 2001). Allusions in his texts suggest that he worked for the Visconti family in Milan around the turn of the 15th century (Nádas and Ziino 1990), and a "frater Antoniello de Caserta" mentioned in an archival document may indicate that he was at the Visconti court in Pavia in 1402 (Günther and Stone 2001). Antonello was a monk, though the order to which he belonged is not known.

== Music ==
Antonello da Caserta is one of the more renowned composers of the generation after Guillaume de Machaut. Antonello set texts in both French and Italian, including Beauté parfaite of Machaut; this is the only surviving musical setting of a poem by Machaut which is not by Machaut himself. He was highly influenced by French musical models, one of the first Italians to be so. One of his ballades quotes Jehan Vaillant, a composer active in Paris. He also made use of irregular mensuration signs, found in few other manuscripts. He also uses proportional rhythms in some ballades, a device which became more popular in later periods. His Italian works tend to be simpler, especially the ballate. Both his French and Italian works take as their subjects courtly love.

== Works ==
=== French ===
(all for three voices)

Ballades

- Amour m'a le cuer mis
- Beauté parfaite
- Dame d'onour en qui
- Du val prilleus (or Du ciel perileus)
- Notes pour moi ceste ballade
- Nulle pitie de ma dame (possibly by Antonello)

Rondeaux

- Dame d'onour c'on ne puet esprixier
- Dame zentil en qui est ma sperance

Virelai

- Tres nouble dame souverayne

=== Italian ===
(all for two voices)

Ballatas

- A pianger l'ochi
- Con dogliosi martire
- Deh, vogliateme oldire
- Madonna, io me ramento
- Or tolta pur me sey
- Più chiar ch'el sol (with a fragmentary third voice)

Madrigal

- Del glorioso titolo d'esto duce

=== Attributable on stylistic or other grounds ===
- Hors suis ye bien (rondeau)
- Je ne puis avoir plaisir (virelai)
- Nulle pitié de ma dame (virelai)
- Puer natus in Betleem unde gaude Yerusalem (hymn)
- Langue puens envenimée (ballade)
