= Antonella Colonna Vilasi =

- Born: Civita Castellana, Italy
- Occupations: Teacher, Writer

Antonella Colonna Vilasi is the President of the Research Center on Intelligence in Rome -Italy- UNI.

She was the first European author to have published a trilogy on intelligence issues. She collaborates with numerous scientific journals, with articles on intelligence and security. She teaches in a number of intelligence Agencies. Her many books have mostly been published in Italian, with some translations

== Bibliography ==
- I crimini internazionali, 2008, Edizioni Univ. Romane, ISBN 9788860220813.
- Intelligence, 2008, Arte, ISBN 9788889776933.
- Segreto di Stato e Intelligence, 2008, Edizioni Univ. Romane, ISBN 9788860220660.
- Intelligence. Nuove minacce e terrorismo, 2008, Edizioni Univ. Romane, ISBN 9788860220646.
- 'Ndrangheta. I mille volti di un sistema criminale, 2008, Edizioni Univ. Romane, ISBN 9788860220776.
- Il bullismo, 2008, Arte Tipografica, ISBN 9788889776940.
- Europol e cooperazione fra gli organi di polizia degli stati membri dell'Unione Europea in materia di criminalità, 2008, Edizioni Univ. Romane, ISBN 9788860220752.
- Un conflitto atipico, 2008, Edizioni Univ. Romane, ISBN 9788860220806.
- Il mercato dell'energia in Italia, 2008, Arte Tipografica, ISBN 9788889776957.
- Crimine e onore, 2008, Edizioni Univ. Romane, ISBN 9788860220721.
- Note di criminologia femminile, 2008, Edizioni Univ. Romane, ISBN 9788860220691.
- Frammenti di diritto pubblico generale, 2008, Edizioni Univ. Romane, ISBN 9788860220684.
- La grafologia, 2008, Edizioni Univ. Romane, ISBN 9788860220653.
- Le testimonianze dei bambini, 2008, Edizioni Univ. Romane, ISBN 9788860220745.
- Il terrosimo marittimo, 2008, Edizioni Univ. Romane, ISBN 9788860220714.
- Il terrorismo, 2009, Mursia, ISBN 9788842543978.
- Roma da scrivere, 2010, Drengo, ISBN 9788888812267.
- Manuale di educazione degli adulti, 2010, QuiEdit, ISBN 9788864640631.
- Pedagogia sociale. Figure del disordine quotidiano, 2010, Pensa Editore, ISBN 9788861521179.
- Pedagogia sociale. Scritti di pedagogia sociale contemporanea, 2010 Pensa Editore, ISBN 9788861521117.
- Scrivere degli altri e di se'. La biografia tra scienza, arte e memoria, 2010, Fond. Buttitta
- Il recupero sociale, 2010, Il Filo, ISBN 9788856720860.
- Manuale di intelligence, 2011, Città del Sole ed., ISBN 9788873514701.
- Islam tra pace e guerra, 2011, Città del Sole ed., ISBN 9788873514695.
- Io, figlio parricida, 2011, Iris, ISBN 9788889322222.
- Mafie. Origini e sviluppo del fenomeno mafioso, 2012, Dissensi ed., ISBN 9788896643129.
- Etnografie, 2012, Aracne ed.
- Un eroe italiano, 2012, Neftasia ed., ISBN 9788860381835.
- Reportage dal Libano. Tra guerre, servizi segreti e primavera Araba, 2012, Satweiss ed. Germania
- Ricette di spie. Gastrocultura di intelligence, 2012, Satweiss ed. Germania
- The History of MI-6, Simon&Schuster
- Storia dell'MI6, Sovera ed.
- Storia dei servizi segreti italiani. Dall'Unità d'Italia alle sfide del XXI secolo, Citta' del Sole edizioni
- The History of Mossad, Penguin
- La storia del Mossad, Sovera edizioni
- Intelligence. Evoluzione e funzionamento dei servizi segreti, Libellula edizioni
- Le Agenzie mondiali di Intelligence, Trilogia, Libellula edizioni
- Reportage dall'Egitto. Tra rivoluzioni mancate, servizi segreti e primavere arabe, Libellula edizioni
- Storie di intelligence, Libellula edizioni
- Spystory-ll fango e la gloria, Romanzo Robin edizioni
- The history of the Cia, Penguin Group Publishing UK Release
- The history of the Cia, Penguin Group Publishing USA Release

== Awards ==
- Parole e poesia Italian Award (2008)
- Premio Nabokov Italian Award (2009)
- Premio Moica Italian Award (2009)
- Premio Giovanni Gronchi Italian Award (2009)
- Premio Tindari Italian Award (2010)
- Premio Pennino d'Oro Italian Award (2010)
- Premio La Rocca d'Oro Italian Award (2010)
- Città di Anagni Italian Award (2010)
- Giovanni Gronchi Italian Award (2010)
- Firenze Capitale d'Europa Italian Award (2010)
