= Franco Scepi =

Italian artist

Franco Scepi (born 1941 in Piacenza, Italy) is an Italian artist, graphic designer and film director.

Scepi attended the Brera Academy in Milan where he was a student of Gianfilippo Usellini. After a spell like set designer at La Scala Theatre in Milan, he replaced Fortunato Depero as Art Director at Campari, where he worked for over ten years.

He directed the films Can Cannes (1980) and Packaging (1982).

In 1999, Mikhail Gorbachev and the Nobel Peace Laureates added their signatures to Scepi's work Man for Peace. Originally created in 1977 for the poster of the Andrzej Wajda film Man of Marble, Man for Peace was inspired by Karol Wojtyła as a symbol that foresaw the fall of the Berlin Wall. With the support of the MAGI Museum in Bologna, several editions of the monument have been subsequently acquired by town municipalities and art galleries.

== Bibliography ==
- Alberto Abruzzese and Morando Morandini “Dietro lo spot Franco Scepi gira Campari”, Mazzotta Editore, Milan, 1986
- Gillo Dorfles, Massimo Di Forti and Franco Scepi, “Images from Italy”, Mazzotta Editore, Milan, 1987
- Marc Le Cannu and Gillo Dorfles, “Over Ad Art: From Depero to Scepi” Electa, Milan, 1989
- Franco Scepi, "Produzione d’immagini”, CDS Milan, 1990
- Guido Vergani, "Thirty Years and a Century of the Campari Company", Campari, 1990
- "Franco Scepi: Over Ad Art", Alex Gallery, Washington, 1993
- Franco Scepi “Strategia dell’immaginazione” Edizioni l’Artistica, Savigliano, 1992
- VV.AA., "Mikhail Gorbachev: Arte per la pace - oltre ogni muro, l’Uomo della Pace di Scepi", Bora, Bologna, 2000
- Franco Scepi, "Man for Peace", Tipleco Editore, Piacenza, 2003
- Franco Scepi, "Man for Peace", Sambero Editore, Troia, 2004 and 2005
- "Percorso nel Tempo: L'antica Casa di Franco Scepi", Sambero Editore, Troia, 2006
