= Antonella Cappuccio =

Italian artist (born 1944)

Antonella Cappuccio (born 21 February 1944) is an Italian artist.

== Life ==
Cappuccio was born in Ischia and moved to Rome with her family. She studied at the Accademia di costume e di moda there, going on to work in cinema and television as a costume designer. During the 1970s, she turned to art as a full-time career.

She has produced works for the Arma dei Carabinieri, for the Roman Catholic Church and for the Italian Republic, as well as for private collectors. Many of her works are in Vatican City. In 2004, she completed a large painting for the new Marriott Hotel in Rome.

Cappuccio was named to the Italian Order of Merit for Labour and was named a Commander in the Order of Merit of the Italian Republic. She was also nominated to the Pontifical Academy of Fine Arts and Letters of the Virtuosi al Pantheon.

While firmly based in the modern world, her work often takes on subjects from the Italian Renaissance and incorporates the style of the Italian masters.

She married Luigi Muccino; the couple have three children.
