= Antonello Padovano =

Italian film director and producer

Antonello Padovano, is an Italian film director and producer. He is currently the director of Hands That Should Be Farming Productions based in England. Padovano won the 2019 Bayern 2 – Audience Prize at the Tegernsee International Mountain Film Festival for his documentary The Ascent of Everest which featured footage of Sir Edmund Hillary.

== Filmography ==
- Joe Petrosino: A Shot in the Dark (2006)
- Le quattro porte del deserto (2006)
- The Ascent of Everest (2019)
