= Antonello Bonci =

American physician

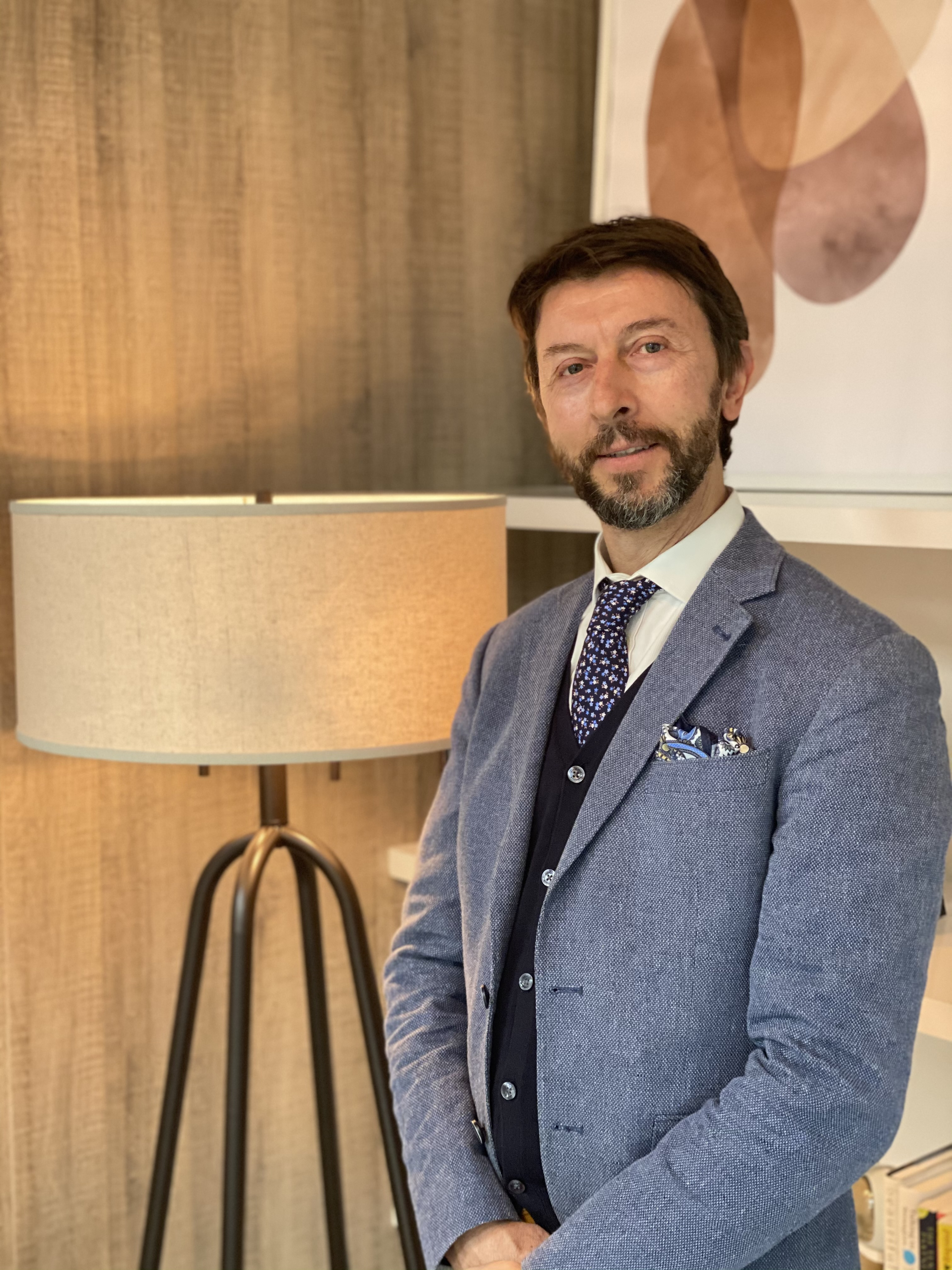
- Education: Università Cattolica del Sacro Cuore (MD)
- Scientific career
- Fields: Neuropsychopharmacology
- Workplaces: University of California, San Francisco; National Institute on Drug Abuse

Antonello Bonci is an Italian-American neurologist and a neuropsychopharmacologist specialized in the long-term effects of drug exposure on the brain. In August 2019, he became president of Global Institutes on Addictions Miami. Bonci was previously the scientific director of the National Institute on Drug Abuse and a professor at the University of California, San Francisco.

== Education ==
In 1985, Bonci went to Medical School at the Università Cattolica del Sacro Cuore, where he graduated cum laude in 1991. In that same year, he started a Residency in Neurology at the University of Rome Tor Vergata where he graduated cum laude in 1995.

== Career ==
Bonci became assistant professor in Residence at the University of California, San Francisco in 1999. He became Associate Professor in Residence in 2004, and Professor in Residence in 2007. When he left in 2010, Bonci was Professor in Residence in the Department of Neurology at the University of California, San Francisco (UCSF), the Howard J. Weinberg Endowed Chair in Addiction Research, and the Associate Director for Extramural Affairs at the Ernest Gallo Clinic and Research Center. In 2010, he was appointed as the Scientific Director of National Institute on Drug Abuse (NIDA). Bonci resigned from his position in August 2019 after a sexual misconduct probe was opened against him for allegedly "sexual targetting" a trainee as well as directing resources to another trainee with whom he had an intimate relationship.

Bonci is currently the President and Chief Scientific Officer at GIA Miami and Vita Recovery.

=== Research ===
Bonci is known for his studies on the long-term effects of drug exposure on the brain. Bonci's laboratory, in collaboration with Robert Malenka, was the first to demonstrate that drugs of abuse, such as cocaine, modify the strength of the connections between neurons. This finding cast a new light on the phenomenon of drug addiction, as a process where maladaptive learning plays a role. Subsequent studies have combined electrophysiological, optogenetic, molecular, and behavioral techniques to determine the long-term effects that are produced by chronic exposure to stress, cocaine or ethanol, with the goal of creating novel therapeutic avenues to decrease the devastating effects of these conditions. In 2013, a study led by Billy T. Chen, provided rationale for the use of non-invasive brain stimulation, such as repeated Transcranial Magnetic Stimulation, in patients with cocaine use disorders. Clinical studies have indeed shown the potential of such technology in the treatment of cocaine use disorders.; In Europe, publications by Dr. Bonci and collaborators have been used by the TMS company Mag Venture to obtain the European CE approval for treatment of addiction.

== Awards and honors ==
- October, 2004 - Jacob P. Waletzky Memorial Award
- December, 2009 - Daniel H. Efron Award at the American College of Neuropsychopharmacology
- February 6, 2014 - Officer of the Order of the Star of Italy.
- November, 2015 - PrimiDieci USA
- July, 2016 - Federation of European Neuroscience Societies and European Journal of Neuroscience Award.
- October, 2016 - Member of the National Academy of Medicine
