= Antonello Matarazzo =

- Born: Antonello Matarazzo; February 23, 1962; Avellino, Italy
- Known for: Painting, Cinema, Video installation
- Movement: Medialismo

Antonello Matarazzo is an exponent of Medialismo, an Italian movement that postulate different media interaction. He has been engaged in his personal search concerning the visual arts, combining moving pictures with "still" ones, shifting from film-making to paintings and realizing video installations and video projections in galleries, museums and festivals in Italy and outside since 1990.

Since 2000, the year of his debut video, The Fable, a short film produced and broadcast by Fuori Orario (Raitre), he has taken part in many national and international festivals, such as the Venice Film Festival, Festival Cinéma Méditerranéen Montpellier, Rome Film Fest, Torino Film Festival, Festival international du film sur l'art de Montréal, Mar del Plata Film Festival and the Locarno International Film Festival), receiving many prizes and rave reviews. Some of the most famous Italian jet set personalities, like the film critic Enrico Ghezzi and the actress Piera Degli Esposti starred in his artistic films. In 2006, a whole retrospective of his works took place within the 42° Mostra Internazionale del Nuovo Cinema di Pesaro.

== Sources ==
=== Enciclopedias ===
- Enciclopedia dell'Arte Zanichelli, Zanichelli editore, Bologna 2004 ISBN 88-08-07931-7
- Cinema italiano, a cura di Stefano Della Casa, editrice il Castoro, Milano 2004 ISBN 88-8033-270-8

=== Books ===
- Videofusion1 – Gabriele Perretta. Stampa Alternativa / Nuovi Equilibri edition, Roma 2007
- Miserere - Andrea Cortellessa, Gabriele Perretta. Squilibri Editore, Roma 2006 ISBN 88-89009-28-4
- Neotelevisione - Marcello Pecchioli. Edizioni Costa & Nolan, Milano 2006 ISBN 88-7437-011-3
- I mestieri di Ergon - Gabriele Perretta. Edizioni Mimesis, Milano 2005 ISBN 88-8483-230-6
- Media.comm(unity)/comm.medium - Gabriele Perretta. Edizioni Mimesis, Milano 2004 ISBN 88-8483-223-3

=== Catalogues ===
- Invideo 2007. Poetroniche – Elena Marcheschi. Mimesis Edizioni, Milano 2007 ISBN 978-88-8483-598-7
- p. I.T.t.u.r.a. (ipotesi figurative italiane) - Gianluca Marziani. Edizioni StudioSei, Milano 2006
- Milano doc Festival 2007 - Bruno Di Marino, Claudio Strinati. Edizioni Doc Fest, Roma 2007
- Invideo 2005. A rovescio – Sandra Lischi, Elena Marcheschi. Revolver edition, Bologna 2005 ISBN 88-88995-10-2
- Antonello Matarazzo: Steak&Steel - Alfonso Amendola, Gabriele Perretta. International Printing Editore, Avellino 2005 ISBN 88-7868-002-8
- BovArchè - Meridiani d'Oriente - Gabriele Perretta. Liriti Editore, Reggio Calabria 2004
- XI Biennale d'Arte Sacra - Maria Luisa Caffarelli. Edizioni Staurós di S. Gabriele, Isola del Gran Sasso TE 2004
- Antonello Matarazzo - Enrico Ghezzi, Marisa Vescovo. Edizioni Studio Vigato, Alessandria 2003
- Laboratorio Politico di Fine Secolo - Gabriele Perretta. Edizioni Dell'Ortica, Bologna 1997
- Aperto Italia '97 - Simona Barucco. Giancarlo Politi Editore, Milano 1997 ISBN 88-7816-098-9

== Exhibitions ==
2008

- Project 59, edited by Irina Danilova, organized by Jade Walker, Creative Research Laboratory, The University of Texas at Austin, Austin, Texas (USA)
- Project 59, edited by Irina Danilova, organized by Laura Conchelos, B1 Lounge, South Pole / The University of Southern Maine, Portland (ME)

2007

- Project 59, edited by Irina Danilova, organized by Karl Lind – Gallery Homeland, Portland, Oregon (USA)
- Made in Italy - Genius Loci, edited by Bruno Roberti / Archivio Raro video, edited by Bruno Di Marino – Filmstudio, Roma
- Attori/Spettatori, edited by Raffaele Curi, Bruno Di Marino – Fondazione Alda Fendi, Roma
- Project 59, organized by Tamara Alexandrovna Galeyeva – Center of Contemporary Culture, The Urals State University, Yekaterinburg (RUS)
- Project 59, edited by Irina Danilova – OkNo Gallery, Chelyabinsk (RUS)
- La posa infinita (solo exhibition), coordinated by Milano Doc Festival – Museo Nazionale della Scienza e della Tecnologia 'Leonardo da Vinci', Milano
- Project 59, edited by Irina Danilova – The Galaxie, Doc Films / University of Chicago, Chicago (USA)
- Interreg III C - Noè, edited by Simona Isgrò, Valentina Valerio – Conseil de la Région PACA office, Marsiglia (FR)
- Miserere, edited by Canio Loguercio – PAN (Palazzo delle Arti), Napoli

2006

- Miserere, edited by Canio Loguercio – Basilica di S. Maria in Ara Coeli, Roma
- 10 secondi (solo exhibition), coordinated by Fondazione RomaEuropa – Teatro Palladium, Roma
- 4° International Designexpo - Transversalità, edited by Federica Dal Falco, Antonella Greco – Ex Magazzini Generali, Roma
- 22nd Art Amsterdam (solo exhibition), stand StudioSei Arte Contemporanea – Amsterdam Art Fair exhibition pavilions, Amsterdam (NL)
- Phoenix, A transformative Multi Media Co-creation, coordinated by Bayennale 2006 – Ghost Town Galleries, Oakland - California (USA)
- Video On/On Video, edited by Bruno Di Marino – Arte Parma exhibition pavilions, Parma
- p. I.T.t.u.r.a. (ipotesi figurative italiane), edited by Gianluca Marziani – StudioSei Arte Contemporanea, Milano
- Arco, stand Changing Role-Move Over Gallery – Arco exhibition pavilions, Madrid (SP)

2005

- Fujiyama vs. Vesuvio (videoretrospective), edited by Alfonso Amendola, Antonello Tolve – Villa Campolieto, Ercolano NA

2004

- XI Biennale d'Arte Sacra, edited by Carlo Chenis, Marisa Vescovo – Museo Staurós d'Arte Sacra Contemporanea, Isola del Gran Sasso TE
- BovArchè - Meridiani d'Oriente (Venice Biennale circuit), edited by Gabriele Perretta – Palazzo Mesiani, Bova RC
- Media.comm(unity)/comm.medium, edited by Gabriele Perretta – Masedu-Museo d'Arte Contemporanea, Sassari

2003

- Testimoni per caso (solo exhibition), testi di Enrico Ghezzi, Marisa Vescovo – Studio Vigato, Alessandria
- Imago Mentis, edited by Gabriele Perretta – galleria Romberg, Latina / galleria La Giarina, Verona

[...] 1997

- Aperto '97, edited by Simona Barucco, organized by Flash Art – Trevi Flash Art Museum, Trevi PG

[...] 1991

- Matarazzo-Miro-Sabatello, edited by Giuseppe Selvaggi – Museo Trasporti, Budapest (H)

== Film Festivals ==
2007

- 9. Festival des Cinémas Différents de Paris, Parigi (F)
- 17. InVideo Mostra Internazionale di Video e Cinema oltre, Spazio Oberdan, Milano
- 2. Rome Film Festival, Roma
- 60. Locarno International Film Festival, Locarno (CH)
- 17. Festival Cinema Africano, d'Asia e America Latina, Milano
- 22. Mar del Plata Film Festival, Buenos Aires (RA)

2006

- 11. Roma Film Festival, (Eventi/Etrange), Roma
- 42. Mostra Internazionale del Nuovo Cinema, (retrospective), Pesaro.
- Reggio Calabria Film Festival, (retrospective), Reggio Calabria
- 24. Festival International du Film sur l'Art (FIFA), Montréal (CDN)
- Festival International de Film et Vidéo de Création, Beirut (RL)

2005

- 15. InVideo Mostra Internazionale di Video e Cinema oltre, Spazio Oberdan, Milano
- 27. Festival International Cinéma Méditerranéen Montpellier, Montpellier (F)
- 62. Venice International Film Festival, Venezia
- 8. Expresión en Corto, Guanajuato (MEX)
- 41. Mostra Internazionale del Nuovo Cinema, Pesaro
- Festival d'Arte di Palazzo Venezia, (Nuovi linguaggi), Roma • 1° Price

2004

- 22. Torino Film Festival, (Spazio Italia), Torino
- 26. Festival International Cinéma Méditerranéen Montpellier, Montpellier (F)
- 7. 'O Curt, Institut Française Le Grenoble, Napoli
- International Film Festival of Fine Art, Szolnok (H)
- 7. Expresión en Corto, Guanajuato (MEX)
- 12. Arcipelago, (E-Movie), Roma • Special Mention

2003

- 21. Torino Film Festival, (Spazio Italia), Torino
- 11. Arcipelago, (Corto.web), Roma • 1° Price
- 21. Bellaria Film Festival, (Anteprima), Bellaria RN

2002

- 20. Torino Film Festival, (Spazio Italia), Torino

2001

- 19. Bellaria Film Festival, (Anteprima), Bellaria RN

2000

- 18. Bellaria Film Festival, (Anteprima), Bellaria RN

== Video-filmography ==
- 4B movie ( © 2007 col. DVcam 5' )
- La posa infinita ( © 2007 b/w DVcam 3 video 1' loop cad)
- Luna Zero ( © 2007 col. DVcam 10' )
- Mummy ( © 2007 col. DVcam 3' loop )
- tribal TRIBAL ( © 2007 col. DVcam 3' )
- Piera e gli assassini ( © 2007 col. DVcam 6' )
- 9 06 83 ( © 2006 col. DVcam 4' )
- Interferenze ( © 2006 col. DVcam 30' )
- En plain air ( © 2005 col. DVcam 10' )
- Miserere (cantus) ( © 2005 col. DVcam 8' )
- Lovers ( © 2004 col. DVcam 24' )
- Apice ( © 2004 col. DVcam 6' )
- A Sua immagine ( © 2004 col. DVcam 3' )
- Miserere ( © 2004 col. DVcam 19' )
- Warh ( © 2003 col. DV 8') VIDEO
- La Camera Chiara ( © 2003 b/w-col. DV 8' )
- Astrolìte ( © 2002 b/w-col. miniDV 40' )
- Mi chiamo Sabino ( © 2001 b/w-col. miniDV 11' )
- Le cose vere ( © 2001 b/w-col. miniDV 28' )
- Dance purge ( © 2000 b/w-col. DV 9' )
- The Fable ( © 2000 b/w-col. DV 9' )
