= Antonella Rebuzzi =

Italian politician

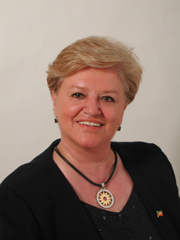
Antonella Rebuzzi senato

Antonella Rebuzzi (29 July 1954 – 30 June 2018) was an Italian politician who served as a Senator from 2006 to 2008.
