= Notari =

Notari is a surname. It may refer to:

== People ==
- Aldo Notari (1932–2006), Italian baseball executive, and a president of the International Baseball Federation
- Angelo Notari (1566/1573–1663), Italian composer
- Eduardo Notari (1903–1986), Italian film actor of the silent era
- Elvira Notari (1875–1946), Italian silent-era film director
- Fabrice Notari (born 1958), Monegasque politician, architect and former alpine skier
- Francesco de' Notari, O.M. (died 1652), Roman Catholic prelate
- Guido Notari (1893–1957), Italian actor and radio presenter
- Louis Notari (1879–1961), Monégasque writer
  - Louis Notari Library, the National library of Monaco
- Mattia Notari (born 1979), Italian footballer
- Nicola Notari, Italian cinematographer and film director
- Roxane Noat-Notari (1913–2004), Monegasque politician
- Umberto Notari (1878–1950), Italian journalist, author, and editor

== Other ==
- Notari Matsutarō, Japanese sports-manga magazine serial

== See also ==
- Notaris, a disambiguation page
