= Soldier's Fantasy =

1927 film

- Directed by: Elvira Notari
- Produced by: Elvira Notari; Nicola Notari
- Cinematography: Nicola Notari
- Production company: Film Dora
- Distributed by: Film Dora
- Release date: June 1927
- Running time: 34 min
- Country: Italy
- Languages: Silent; Italian intertitles

Soldier's Fantasy (Italian: Fantasia 'e surdate) is a 1927 Italian silent film directed by Elvira Notari and starring Geppino Jovine, Eduardo Notari and Oreste Tesorone. It is preserved in the National Film Archive of Rome.

== Cast ==
- Geppino Jovine as Gigi
- Eduardo Notari as Gennariello
- Oreste Tesorone
- Lina Ciprani

== Bibliography ==
- Bruno, Giuliana. Streetwalking on a Ruined Map: Cultural Theory and the City Films of Elvira Notari. Princeton University Press, 1993.
