= Saving the Appearances =

1957 book by Owen Barfield

- Cover of the 2011 Barfield Press edition
- Author: Owen Barfield
- Subject: Consciousness; Philosophy of science Philosophy of mind Religion and science
- Publisher: Wesleyan, Barfield Press
- Publication date: 1957
- Publication place: United Kingdom
- Media type: Paperback, Hardcover
- Pages: 191 (Wesleyan ed.)
- ISBN: 978-0955958281
- Dewey Decimal: 126
- LC Class: BL240.2.B38 1988
- Preceded by: This Ever Diverse Pair (1950)
- Followed by: Worlds Apart: A Dialogue of the 1960s (1963)

Saving the Appearances: A Study in Idolatry, a book by British philosopher Owen Barfield, is concerned with physics, the evolution of consciousness, pre-history, ancient Greece, ancient Israel, the medieval period, the scientific revolution, Christianity, Romanticism, and much else. The book was Barfield's favorite of those he wrote, and the one that he most wanted to continue to be read.

It was first published in England in 1957, and it was first issued in paperback in the United States in 1965. According to Barfield, the book enjoyed a far greater reception by the public in the United States, where Barfield often accepted invitations to lecture, than it did in England.

The book explores approximately three thousand years of history –particularly the history of human consciousness in relation to that which precedes or underlies the world of perception or phenomena. Given the vast field considered by the book, it is concise and brief, about two hundred pages.

Barfield describes the growth of human consciousness as an interaction with nature, leading the reader to a fresh understanding of man's history, circumstances, and destiny. Saving the Appearances has in common with some thoughts of Teilhard de Chardin the understanding of idols as appearances having nothing within. "[A] representation, which is collectively mistaken for an ultimate – ought not to be called a representation. It is an idol. Thus the phenomena themselves are idols, when they are imagined as enjoying that independence of human perception which can in fact only pertain to the unrepresented."

== Reception ==
Saving the Appearances is regarded by Philip Zaleski as being among the 100 most prominent spiritual books of the twentieth century. Theologian Thomas J. J. Altizer said of the work, "I believe that this book is potentially one of the truly seminal works of our time." When the editors of The American Scholar asked noted classicist Norman O. Brown to identify the book published in the last decade which he found himself going back most often to, he responded, "I want to name Owen Barfield’s Saving the Appearances". C.S. Lewis referred to Barfield as "the wisest and best of my unofficial teachers."

== Synopsis ==
=== An evolution of phenomena correlative to an evolution of consciousness ===
Barfield argues that if, as physics suggests, ordinary appearances—including for example colors, sounds, and smells—are a kind of subjective response of the human organism to an unknown underlying base of reality, and if what underlies our phenomena and is real independently of us is only what is suggested by science's experimental hypotheses of a subatomic world; if, that is, we must conclude that there is no such thing as unseen color, unheard sound, or unfelt solidity, because physics tells us the only thing existing independently of us is a subsensible or supersensible base symbolized in some detail by particle theory—then in that case other sciences besides physics, in particular those sciences that deal with the pre-human past, must be profoundly reconceived.

For example, the evolutionary biologist and the archaeologist talk about the pre-human, and even pre-life distant past as if color, sound, solidity, and a phenomenal world rather like that of modern Western humanity were all present even before the advent of life and consciousness, though physics tells us that all that is present in the absence of human beings or life is what can be described quantitatively by the particle theories of physics. Barfield emphasizes that contradiction between physics on the one hand, and on the other, sciences that offer an account of the earth before life and consciousness evolved. Barfield draws out the implications and argues we must learn to conceive of an evolution of phenomena that first begins at the point where life and consciousness manifest. The evolution of phenomena is correlative to the evolution of consciousness. Prior to the point where consciousness, and in particular human consciousness, comes into existence, we should not naively speak as if phenomena similar to our own existed.

Barfield's thesis and intentions in the book, looked at in close enough detail, do not commit him to accepting the view that all that is present independently of human awareness is what physics describes of a subatomic world. Rather, he is positioned to entertain his fundamental thesis when he merely allows that what "underlies" the phenomena is at least provisionally somewhat different from and other than the phenomena (this means, for example, that what "underlies" phenomena could include, in addition to the subatomic world, a non-physical, pre-physical, or spiritual world of "potentia"). Barfield's thesis also depends on recognizing, as virtually every form of cognitive science, psychology, and recent philosophy does recognize, that perception of a coherent phenomenal world of experience is to a great extent dependent on some kind of organizing activity working in or via the percipient. The activity in question is mostly unconscious, and is or resembles a kind of thinking.

When assuming the absence of human percipients (for example in the pre-human past), Barfield says we should no longer naively speak of the world as if phenomena like those of human beings were present. Yet archaeologists and evolutionary biologists still do so all the time, forgetting what physics has been telling us.

=== §1: The Rainbow ===
Barfield argues that one key difference between a dream or hallucination of, say, a rainbow and the sight of an actual rainbow is that — while they are both appearances or "representations" (key words for Barfield) – the dream rainbow is private, whereas the actual rainbow is shared. He is careful to point out, however, that being shared is not the only difference between an actual rainbow and a dream of one. An actual phenomenon is not merely a dream that is shared. Even if one is alone on a desert island, one can learn from the world itself the difference between appearances that are actually there, and appearances that are there only in the manner of hallucinations.

Barfield argues that three components make up an appearance, say, of a real tree: (1) the "unrepresented," namely that which is supposed to be independent of human consciousness (2) a person's vision, and (3) other sense-perceptions. Sometimes he refers to the "unrepresented" as "the particles," (such as atoms and subatomic particles) though he does not mean that literally but only as a kind of concession to the conventional view, which he adopts to begin with for the sake of discussion. If one reads him carefully, however, one discovers that by "unrepresented," he means a provisionally unknown "subsensible" or "supersensible" base; whether that base is in fact merely what physics suggests, or is something more, he leaves open to begin with. During the course of the book, it becomes clear that the unrepresented, while including what physics discovers, is infinitely more.

In the first chapter, he says a "representation" is something I perceive to be there. He wants to establish that

the familiar world which we see and know around us – the blue sky with white clouds in it, the noise of a waterfall or a motor-bus, the shapes of flowers and their scent, the gesture and utterance of animals and the faces of our friends – the world too, which (apart from the special inquiry of physics) experts of all kinds methodically investigate – is a system of collective representations. The time comes when one must either accept this as the truth about the world or reject the theories of physics as an elaborate delusion.

=== §2: Collective Representations ===
Barfield argues that one of the most important tests in distinguishing an appearance or representation that is not really outside us from an appearance that is really present outside us, is to get confirmation from fellow human beings. Barfield also wishes to stress the difference between the collective representations on the one hand and the unrepresented (the subsensible or supersensible base), on the other. He wants to establish that

if the particles, or the unrepresented, are in fact all that is independently there, then the world we all accept as real is in fact a system of collective representations.

(The book considers not merely representations and the "unrepresented," but also the "represented.")

In chapter one, Barfield refers to the unrepresented as that which exists entirely independently of human consciousness. Before human beings came into existence, the unrepresented existed. But now that human beings exist, when our perceptual systems and our consciousness interact with the unrepresented, a phenomenal world is produced, which is the world of collective representations.

Barfield argues that in perception: (1) "we must not confuse the percept with its cause" (for example, if particles/waves cause sounds, we must recognize that the experience of sound is no more like the theorized waves/particles than drops of rain are like the sight of a rainbow) and (2) we do not perceive with a sense-organ alone, but with a great part of our whole human being. Much besides mere sense perception is necessary. Without things "like mental habits, memory, imagination, feeling and ... will" the world would be a blooming, buzzing confusion. Barfield insists that these two maxims are consistent with almost any theory of perception: perception depends to a large extent upon the thinking activity—conscious and mostly less than conscious—of perceivers.

=== §3: Figuration and Thinking ===
Barfield states that there are three different things we can do with representations:

(1) We can simply experience the representations. For experience, it is necessary to have two components: (a) sense-organs must be influenced by the unrepresented (subsensible or supersensible base), and (b) the act of figuration, in which the percipient mind combines and construes sensations into a relatively ordered phenomenal world of beings and things. To begin with, figuration is largely unconscious.

(2) We can think about the representations. At this point, we are still unconscious of the intimate relationship that these representations have with our own figuration activity. In thinking about representations, we begin to treat the representations as entirely other, or distinct, from us and from each other, so they gradually cease to appear to us as representations: we start to perceive them instead as mere "things." For convenience and to avoid the confusion that comes with already loaded popular terms, Barfield calls this thinking about the representations alpha-thinking.

(3) We can think about the nature of collective representations and about how they relate to our own minds. We can think about perceiving and think about thinking. Philosophy and psychology study such things. Again, to avoid confusion, Barfield calls this beta-thinking.

Barfield points out that despite the distinctions between these types of thinking, they blend into one another and interact in important ways. Saving the Appearances is a study of the relationship between figuration and alpha-thinking, but also concerns the ways in which beta-thinking affects and is affected by the other two phases of mental activity.

=== §4: Participation ===
Participation refers to a non-sensory unity between the perceiver and the representations. In this context, Barfield argues against a common view that says 1) the phenomena or representations of primitives are just like ours, and 2) the primitive differs from us in primitively theorizing that spirits are the cause of phenomena. The primitive in that common view is a sort of baby scientist just starting out who comes up with childish, superstitious causal explanations. Barfield disagrees with this portrayal of the primitive mind, citing anthropologists Émile Durkheim and Lucien Lévy-Brühl to the effect that primitive people do not perceive the world in the same way as moderns, nor do they propose spirits in an explanatory way as causes. Rather, primitives live in a world of "original participation," where the phenomena are not perceived as mere "things" separate from each other and from the perceiver. Instead, the primitive is aware of a non-sensory link between himself and the representations, and of the representations among one another. He has barely begun to do "alpha thinking," i.e., the modern person's detached thinking about the representations that tends to isolate them from himself and from each other. The primitive does not use the idea of spirits as a causal explanation of phenomena: in some sense he actually perceives non-sensory elements in the representations, whereby he participates the representations and they participate each other.

Primitive people’s behavior towards the world (as exemplified for example in totemism and animism in ancient literature, artwork, and philosophy) entails above all a different kind of "figuration"—not a primitive alpha thinking applied to the same kind of figuration as that of moderns. The first three chapters of the book focus on the fact that we still participate in the representations, although it is mostly unconscious for us today. Barfield emphasizes that it is no part of his purpose to advocate a return to the primitive's "original participation." He explores how our type of figuration grew out of the primitive type, and can evolve further toward a new form of figuration which he calls "final participation." More generally, the book is concerned with the evolution of consciousness over the last three thousand years.

== Sources ==
- Altizer, Thomas J. J. (October 1964). "Worlds Apart and Saving the Appearances: a review". Journal of Bible and Religion. 32 (4): 384–385. ISSN 0885-2758.
- Barfield, Owen (2011), 'Saving the Appearances: A Study in Idolatry, Barfield Press UK, p. 244, ISBN 978-0-9559582-8-1
- Norman O. Brown (Summer 1965), "Letter in "The Revolving Bookstand,"", The American Scholar, XXXIV: 478
- David Lavery, "How Barfield Thought:The Creative Life of Owen Barfield", The Collected Works of David Lavery (pdf)
- Simon Blaxland-De Lange (2006), Owen Barfield, Romanticism Comes of Age: a Biography, London: Temple Lodge
- David Lavery, Encyclopedia Barfieldiana This encyclopedia on Barfield provides large numbers of articles of commentary and cross referencing of the concepts and specialized lexicon used in Saving the Appearances and other works.
- Lavery, David, "Saving the Appearances:A Study in Idolatry", Encyclopedia Barfieldiana The specific article on the book was also published by same author in "An Owen Barfield Readers Guide." Seven 15 (1998): 97–112
- Philip Zaleski (1999-11-04), "The 100 best spiritual books", The Dallas Morning News, Knight Ridder/Tribune News Service, archived from the original on 2011-07-10
