= Owen Barfield =

British philosopher (1898–1997)

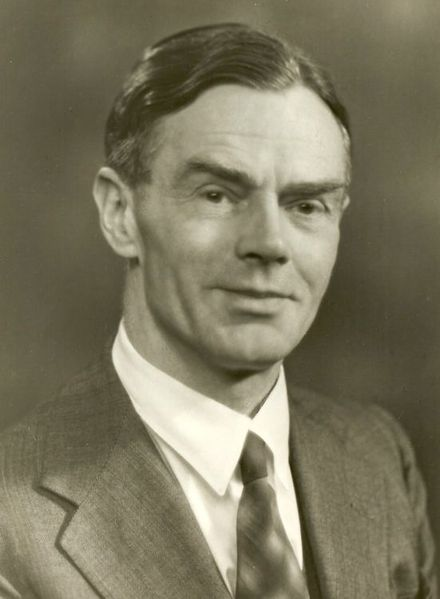
- Owen Barfield in 1937
- Born: 9 November 1898; London, England
- Died: 14 December 1997 (aged 99); Forest Row, England
- Education: Wadham College, Oxford
- Occupations: Philosopher, author, poet

Arthur Owen Barfield (9 November, 1898 – 14 December, 1997) was an English philosopher, author, poet, critic, and member of the Inklings.

== Life ==
Barfield was born in London, to Elizabeth (née Shoults; 1860–1940) and Arthur Edward Barfield (1864–1938). He had three elder siblings: Diana (1891–1963), Barbara (1892–1951), and Harry (1895–1977). He was educated at Highgate School and Wadham College, Oxford and in 1920 received a first class degree in English language and literature. After finishing his B.Litt., which became his third book Poetic Diction, he was a dedicated poet and author for over ten years. After 1934 his profession was as a solicitor in London, from which he retired in 1959 aged 60. Thereafter he had many guest appointments as visiting professor in North America. Barfield published numerous essays, books, and articles. His primary focus was on what he called the "evolution of consciousness," which is an idea which occurs frequently in his writings. He is best known as the author of Saving the Appearances: A Study in Idolatry and as a founding father of Anthroposophy in the English speaking world.

== Family ==
In 1923 he married the musician and choreographer Maud Douie. They adopted three children, Alexander, Lucy, and Geoffrey. After the death of his wife in 1980 he spent his final years in a retirement hotel in Forest Row, East Sussex.

== The Inklings ==
Barfield has been known as "the first and last Inkling." He had a profound influence on C. S. Lewis and, through his books The Silver Trumpet and Poetic Diction (dedicated to Lewis), an appreciable effect on J. R. R. Tolkien, who made use of the ideas in his writings with the theme of decline and fall in Middle-earth. Tolkien embedded this into his legendarium through the device of repeated fragmentation, of the created light, of language, and of peoples especially in the sundering of the Elves. Barfield's contribution, and their conversations, persuaded both Tolkien and Lewis that myth and metaphor have always had a central place in language and literature. "The Inklings work... taken as a whole, has a significance that far outweighs any measure of popularity, amounting to a revitalisation of Christian intellectual and imaginative life."

Barfield and C. S. Lewis met in 1919 as students at Oxford University and were close friends for 44 years. "It is no exaggeration to say that his friendship with Barfield was one of the most important in his [Lewis's] life..." The friendship was reciprocal. Almost a year after Lewis's death, Barfield spoke of his friendship in a talk in the USA: "Now, whatever he was, and as you know, he was a great many things, CS Lewis was for me, first and foremost, the absolutely unforgettable friend, the friend with whom I was in close touch for over 40 years, the friend you might come to regard hardly as another human being, but almost as a part of the furniture of my existence." When they met, Lewis was an atheist who told Barfield, "I don't accept God!" Barfield was influential in converting Lewis. Lewis came to see that there were two kinds of friends, a first friend with whom you feel at home and agree (Lewis's close friend Arthur Greeves was an example of this) and a second friend who brings to you a different point of view. He found Barfield's contribution in this way particularly helpful despite, or because, "during the 1920s, the two were to engage in a long dispute over Barfield's (and their mutual friend, A.C. Harwood's) connection to anthroposophy and the kind of knowledge that imagination can give us... which they affectionately called 'The Great War'. Through their conversations, Lewis gave up materialist realism – the idea that our sensible world is self-explanatory and is all that there is – and moved closer to what he had always disparagingly referred to as "supernaturalism." These conversations influenced Lewis towards writing his Narnia series. As well as being friend and teacher to Lewis, Barfield was (professionally) his legal adviser and trustee.

Barfield was an important intellectual influence on Lewis. Lewis wrote his 1949 book The Lion, the Witch and the Wardrobe, the first Narnia chronicle, for his friend's daughter Lucy Barfield and dedicated it to her. He also dedicated The Voyage of the Dawn Treader to Barfield's adopted son Geoffrey in 1952. Barfield also influenced his scholarship and world view. He dedicated his first scholarly book, The Allegory of Love (1936) to his 'wisest and best of my unofficial teachers,' stating in its preface that he asked no more than to disseminate Barfield's literary theory and practice. Barfield's more than merely intellectual approach to philosophy is illustrated by a well-known interchange that took place between himself and Lewis, which Lewis did not forget. Lewis one day made the mistake of referring to philosophy as "a subject." "It wasn't a subject to Plato," said Barfield, "it was a way". In the third lecture of The Abolition of Man (1947), Lewis suggests that Barfield's mentor, Rudolf Steiner, may have found the way to a "redeemed scientific method that does not omit the qualities of the observed object".

Barfield was also an important influence on Tolkien. In a letter to C. A. Furth of Allen and Unwin in 1937, Tolkien wrote, "the only philological remark (I think) in The Hobbit is...: an odd mythological way of referring to linguistic philosophy, and a point that will (happily) be missed by any who have not read Barfield (few have), and probably by those who have." The reference in question comes when Bilbo visits the dragon Smaug's treasure hoard within the Lonely Mountain: "To say that Bilbo's breath was taken away is no description at all. There are no words left to express his staggerment, since Men changed the language that they learned of elves in the days when all was wonderful. Bilbo had heard tell and sing of dragon-hoards before, but the splendour, the lust, the glory of such treasure had never yet come home to him. His heart was filled and pierced with enchantment..."

Lewis wrote to Barfield in 1928 about his influence on Tolkien: "You might like to know that when Tolkien dined with me the other night he said, apropos of something quite different, that your conception of the ancient semantic unity had modified his whole outlook, and he was always just going to say something in a lecture when your concept stopped him in time. 'It is one of those things,' he said, 'that when you have once seen it there are all sorts of things you never say again."

Barfield's notion of final participation (the idea of a fully conscious participative unity with nature) brought to the Inklings ideas similar to those later expounded by others as radical orthodoxy, with its long theological history. It has roots in the Platonic idea of methexis passed on by Augustine and Aquinas, and offered a sacramental view of reality which Tolkien takes up in The Ring in, for example, the contemplative artistry and natural oneness of the elves, Tom Bombadil and the Hobbits' simple pleasures.

== Anthroposophy ==
Barfield became an anthroposophist after attending a lecture by Rudolf Steiner in 1924. He studied the work and philosophy of Rudolf Steiner throughout his life, translated some of his works, and had some of his own early essays published in anthroposophical publications. This part of Barfield's literary work includes the book The Case for Anthroposophy containing his Introduction to selected extracts from Steiner's Riddles of the Soul. Steiner is always a formative presence in Barfield's work, probably his major influence but Barfield's thought should not be considered merely derivative of Steiner's. Barfield expert G. B. Tennyson suggests that: "Barfield is to Steiner as Steiner was to Goethe", which is illuminating so long as it isn't taken as referring to relative stature. Barfield's writing was not derivative, it was profoundly original, but he did not see himself as having moved beyond Steiner, as, in his opinion, Steiner had moved beyond Goethe. Barfield considered Steiner a much greater man in possession of a greater mind than Goethe, and of course he considered himself very small compared to both of them.

== Influence and opinions ==
Barfield might be characterised as both a Christian writer and a learned anti-reductionist writer. His books have been republished by Barfield UK, with new editions including Unancestral Voice; History, Guilt, and Habit; Romanticism Comes of Age; The Rediscovery of Meaning; Speaker's Meaning; and Worlds Apart. History in English Words seeks to retell the history of Western civilisation by exploring the change in meanings of various words. Saving the Appearances: A Study in Idolatry is on the 1999 100 Best Spiritual Books of the Century list by Philip Zaleski.

Barfield was also an influence on T. S. Eliot who called Barfield's book Worlds Apart "a journey into seas of thought very far from ordinary routes of intellectual shipping."

In her book Splintered Light: Logos and Language in Tolkien's World, Verlyn Flieger analyses the influence of Barfield's Poetic Diction on the writing of J.R.R. Tolkien.

More recent discussions of Barfield's work are published in Stephen Talbott's The Future Does Not Compute: Transcending the Machines in Our Midst, Neil Evernden's The Social Creation of Nature, Daniel Smitherman's Philosophy and the Evolution of Consciousness, Morris Berman's The Reenchantment of the World, and Gary Lachman's A Secret History of Consciousness. In 1996 Lachman conducted perhaps the last interview with Barfield, versions of which appeared in Gnosis magazine and the magazine Lapis.

In his book Why the World Around You isn't as it Appears: A Study of Owen Barfield (SteinerBooks, 2012), Albert Linderman presents Barfield's work in light of recent societal examples and scholarship while writing for an audience less familiar with philosophical categories and history.

In a foreword to Poetic Diction, Howard Nemerov, US Poet Laureate, stated: Among the poets and teachers of my acquaintance who know POETIC DICTION it has been valued not only as a secret book, but nearly as a sacred one.

Saul Bellow, the Nobel Prize–winning novelist, wrote: "We are well supplied with interesting writers, but Owen Barfield is not content to be merely interesting. His ambition is to set us free. Free from what? From the prison we have made for ourselves by our ways of knowing, our limited and false habits of thought, our 'common sense'."

The culture critic and psychologist James Hillman called Barfield "one of the most neglected important thinkers of the 20th Century".

Harold Bloom, describing Poetic Diction, referred to it as "a wonderful book, from which I keep learning a great deal".

The film Owen Barfield: Man and Meaning (1994), co-produced and written by G. B. Tennyson and David Lavery, directed and edited by Ben Levin, is a documentary portrait of Barfield.

Barfield has been held in high esteem by many contemporary poets, including Robert Kelly, Charles Stein, George Quasha, Tom Cheetham, and others.

=== Poetic Diction ===
Barfield's book Poetic Diction begins with examples of "felt changes" arising in reading poetry, and discusses how these relate to general principles of poetic composition. But his greater agenda is "the study of meaning". Using poetic examples, he sets out to demonstrate how the imagination works with words and metaphors to create meaning. He shows how the imagination of the poet creates new meaning, and how this same process has been active, throughout human experience, to create and continuously expand language. For Barfield this is not just literary criticism: it is evidence bearing on the evolution of human consciousness. This, for many readers, is his real accomplishment: his unique presentation of "not merely a theory of poetic diction, but a theory of poetry, and not merely a theory of poetry, but a theory of knowledge". This theory was developed directly from a close study of the evolution of words and meaning, starting with the relation between the primitive mind's myth making capacity, and the formation of words. Barfield uses numerous examples to demonstrate that words originally had a unified "concrete and undivided" meaning, which we now distinguish as several distinct concepts. For example, he points out that the single Greek word pneuma (which can be variously translated as "breath", "spirit", or "wind") reflects the original unity of these concepts of air, spirit, wind, and breath, all included in one "holophrase". This Barfield considers to be not the application of a poetic analogy to natural phenomena, but the discernment of an actual phenomenal unity. Not only concepts, but the phenomena themselves, form a unity, the perception of which was possible to primitive consciousness and therefore reflected in language. This is the perspective Barfield believes to have been primordial in the evolution of consciousness, the perspective which was "fighting for its life", as he phrases it, in the philosophy of Plato, and which, in a regenerate and more sophisticated form, benefiting from the development of rational thought, needs to be recovered if consciousness is to continue to evolve.

=== Worlds Apart ===
Worlds Apart is one of Barfield's most brilliant performances. It is a fictional dialogue between a physicist, a biologist, a psychiatrist, a lawyer-philologist (who might be taken for Barfield himself), a linguistic analyst (more or less the villain), a theologian (who has reminded some readers of C. S. Lewis), a retired Waldorf School teacher, and a young man employed at a rocket research station. During a period of three days, the characters discuss and debate first principles, occasioned at first by the observation that the various branches of modern thought seem to be taking for granted an incompatibility with one another. The discussion culminates in a crescendo of some length from the retired teacher, who expounds the anthroposophical point of view.

=== Saving the Appearances: A Study in Idolatry ===
Saving the Appearances explores the development of human consciousness across some three thousand years of history. Barfield argues that the evolution of nature is inseparable from the evolution of consciousness. What we call matter interacts with mind and wouldn't exist without it. In Barfield's lexicon, there is an "unrepresented" underlying base of reality that is extra-mental. This is comparable to Kant's notion of the "noumenal world". However, unlike Kant, Barfield entertained the idea that the "unrepresented" could be directly experienced, under some conditions.

Similar conclusions have been made by others, and the book has influenced, for example, the physicist Stephen Edelglass (who wrote The Marriage of Sense and Thought), and the Christian existentialist philosopher Gabriel Marcel, who wanted the book to be translated into French.

Barfield points out that the "real" world of physics and particles is completely different from the world we see and live in of things with properties.

In our critical thinking as physicists or philosophers, we imagine ourselves set over against an objective world consisting of particles, in which we do not participate at all. In contrast, the phenomenal, or familiar, world is said to be riddled with our subjectivity. In our daily, uncritical thinking, on the other hand, we take for granted the solid, objective reality of the familiar world, assume an objective, lawful manifestation of its qualities such as color, sound, and solidity, and even write natural scientific treatises about the history of its phenomena—all while ignoring the human consciousness that (by our own, critical account) determines these phenomena from the inside in a continually changing way.

== Major works ==
- The Silver Trumpet (novel) (1925)
- History in English Words (1926) ISBN 978-0-940262-11-9
- Poetic Diction: A Study In Meaning (1928) ISBN 978-0-9559582-4-3
- Romanticism Comes of Age (1944) ISBN 978-0-9569423-1-9
- Greek Thought in English Words (1950) essay in: G. Rostrevor Hamilton, ed. (1950), Essays and Studies 1950, vol. 3, London: John Murray, pp. 69–81
- This Ever Diverse Pair (1950) ISBN 978-0-9559582-5-0
- Saving the Appearances: a Study in Idolatry (1957) ISBN 978-0-9559582-8-1
  - Evolution – Der Weg des Bewusstseins: Zur Geschichte des Europaischen Denkens. (1957) in German, Markus Wulfing (trans.) ISBN 978-3-925177-11-8
  - Salvare le apparenze: Uno studio sull'idolatria (2010) in Italian, Giovanni Maddalena, Stephania Scardicchio (editors) ISBN 978-88-211-6521-4
- Worlds Apart: A Dialogue of the 1960s (1963) ISBN 978-0-9559582-6-7
- Unancestral Voice (1965) ISBN 978-0-9559582-7-4
- Speaker's Meaning (1967) ISBN 978-0-9569423-0-2
- What Coleridge Thought (1971)
- The Rediscovery of Meaning and Other Essays (1977) ISBN 978-0-9569423-3-3
- History, Guilt, and Habit (1979) ISBN 978-1-59731-108-3
- Review of Julian Jaynes, The Origin of Consciousness in the Breakdown of the Bicameral Mind (1979) essay in: Teachers College Record, vol. 80, 1979–2002, pp. 602–604
- Language, Evolution of Consciousness, and the Recovery of Human Meaning (1981)essay reprinted in "Toward the Recovery of Wholeness: Knowledge, Education, and Human Values", ISBN 978-0-8077-2758-4, p 55–61.
- The Evolution Complex (1982) essay in Towards 2.2, vol. 6, Spring 1982, pp. 14–16
- Introducing Rudolf Steiner (1983) essay in Towards 2.4, vol. 42, Fall–Winter 1983
- Orpheus: A Poetic Drama (written in 1937, published in 1983) ISBN 978-0-940262-01-0
- Listening to Steiner (1984) review in Parabola 9.4, 1985, pp. 94–100
- Reflections on C.S. Lewis, S.T. Coleridge and R. Steiner: An Interview with Barfield (1985) in: Towards 2.6, Spring–Summer 1985, pp. 6–13
- Owen Barfield on C. S. Lewis (1989) G. B. Tennyson (ed.) ISBN 978-1-59731-100-7
- The Child and the Giant (1988) short story in: Child and Man: Education as an Art, vol. 22, July 1988, pp. 5–7
  - Das Kind und der Riese – Eine orphische Erzählung (1990) in German, Susanne Lin (trans.)
- A Barfield Reader: Selections from the Writings of Owen Barfield (1990) G. B. Tennyson (ed.) ISBN 978-0-8195-6361-3
- A Barfield Sampler: Poetry and Fiction by Owen Barfield (1993) edited by Jeanne Clayton Hunter and Thomas Kranidas ISBN 978-0-7914-1588-7
- The "Great War" of Owen Barfield and C.S. Lewis: Philosophical Writings, 1927–1930 (2015) Norbert Feinendegen and Arend Smilde (ed.) Inklings Studies Supplements, Nr. 1. ISSN 2057-6099
- The Riddle of the Sphinx: Essays on the Evolution of Consciousness (2023) Rory O'Connor (ed.) ISBN 978-0-956942357

== Sources ==
- Owen Barfield (1973), Poetic Diction: A Study In Meaning, Wesleyan
- Owen Barfield (2010), Worlds Apart (A Dialogue of the 1960s), Middletown, Connecticut: Barfield Press UK, ISBN 978-0-9559582-6-7
- Interview with Bloom, at circa 58 minutes: The Laverytory: Bloom on Barfield
- Saul Bellow (2006), History, Guilt and Habit: Editorial Review, Sophia Perennis, ISBN 1597311081
- Simon Blaxland-De Lange (2006), Owen Barfield, Romanticism Comes of Age: a Biography, London: Temple Lodge
- Flieger, Verlyn (1983). Splintered Light: Logos and Language in Tolkien's World. Wm. B. Eerdmans. ISBN 0-8028-1955-9. Barfield's influence is a significant thesis of this book. Republished by Kent State University Press, 2002.
- Patrick Grant (1982), "The Quality of Thinking: Owen Barfield as Literary Man and Anthroposophist", Seven, 3
- Jane W. Hipolito (2008), "Bibliography of the published Writings of Owen Barfield" ( (PDF)), in Shirley Sugerman (ed.), Evolution of Consciousness: Studies in Polarity, San Rafael, California: Barfield Society, pp. 227–261, ISBN 978-1-59731-116-8, archived from the original on 21 July 2011
- Walter Hooper (19 December 1997). "Obituary: Owen Barfield". The Independent. London.
- Gary Lachman, "One Man's Century: Visiting Owen Barfield", Gnosis, 40: 8
- Gary Lachman, "Owen Barfield and the Evolution of Consciousness", Lapis, 3
- David Lavery, "How Barfield Thought:The Creative Life of Owen Barfield" (PDF), The Collected Works of David Lavery
- David Lavery, Interview with James Hillman, archived from the original on 19 July 2011
- David Lavery, Encyclopedia Barfieldiana, archived from the original on 20 May 2011
- Walter Hooper (1998), C.S. Lewis: A Companion and Guide, HarperCollins, ISBN 978-0-06-063880-1
- C.S. Lewis (1998), Surprised by Joy, Houghton Mifflin Harcourt, ISBN 978-0-15-100185-9
- Shirley Sugerman (2008), "A Conversation with Owen Barfield", Evolution of Consciousness: Studies in Polarity, San Rafael, California: Barfield Press, pp. 3–28, ISBN 978-1-59731-116-8. The work is a festschrift honouring Barfield at age 75.
- G.B. Tennyson; David Lavery (1996), Ben Levin (ed.), Owen Barfield: Man and Meaning documentary (VHS), Encino, California: OwenArts Productions, pp. 40 min
- Donald H. Tuck (1974). The Encyclopedia of Science Fiction and Fantasy. Chicago: Advent. ISBN 0-911682-20-1.
