= Notaris =

Notaris is a surname. It may refer to:

- Carlo De Notaris (1812-1888), Italian painter
- Giuseppe De Notaris (1805–1877), Italian botanist and mycologist
- Sotirios Notaris (fencer) (1879–1924), Greek fencer and Olympic competitor
- Sotirios Notaris (wrestler) (1896–1971), Greek wrestler and Olympic competitor

== See also ==
- Notari, a disambiguation page
- Notaris (beetle), a genus of weevil
