= Italy Has Awakened =

1927 film

- Directed by: Elvira Notari
- Starring: Eduardo Notari
- Cinematography: Nicola Notari
- Production company: Film Dora
- Distributed by: Film Dora
- Release date: November 1927
- Country: Italy
- Languages: Silent; Italian intertitles

Italy Has Awakened (Italian: L'Italia s'è desta) is a 1927 Italian silent film directed by Elvira Notari and starring Eduardo Notari. The title refers to the Italian national anthem "Il Canto degli Italiani".

== Cast ==
- Clara Boni
- Eduardo Notari
- E. Pensa
- Gennaro Santoro
- Oreste Tesorone

== Bibliography ==
- Annette Kuhn. The Women's Companion to International Film. University of California Press, 1990.
