= Carol Zaleski =

Carol Zaleski is an American religious scholar and writer.

Zaleski previously taught at Harvard University, where she received her PhD in the study of religion, and is the professor of world religions at Smith College. She is the author of several acclaimed books on religion, including Otherworld Journeys, The Life of the World to Come and, with her husband Philip Zaleski, The Book of Heaven and Prayer: A History (New York Times notable book; Christian Science Monitor best nonfiction books of 2005). Also with her husband Philip she wrote in 2015 The Fellowship: The Literary Lives of the Inklings J. R. R. Tolkien, C. S. Lewis, Owen Barfield, Charles Williams which received laudatory reviews from The New York Times Book Review, The Washington Post, Time, and the Los Angeles Times. Zaleski is celebrated for her writings on the afterlife, which include the Encyclopædia Britannica articles on heaven, hell, and purgatory. Journalist Lisa Miller has called her "the mother of modern heaven studies". Her published lectures include "In Defense of Immortality", which was part of the Ingersoll Lectures on Human Immortality, and the Albert Cardinal Meyer Lectures at the University of University of Saint Mary of the Lake (published as "The Life of the World to Come"). She writes a regular column on faith for The Christian Century, where she is also editor-at-large, and her essays and reviews appear frequently in newspapers and magazines, including The Washington Post, First Things, America, The New York Times Book Review. Her 2003 First Things essay on "The Dark Night of Mother Teresa" received attention as an early exploration of Mother Teresa's spiritual trials. In 2003, 2005, and 2008, she won the Associated Church Press Award of Excellence in Theological Reflection. Zaleski's intellectual journey to Catholicism was included in the "How my mind has changed" series of reflections by noted theologians published at ten-year intervals by The Christian Century.
