= Adriana Monti =

Italian film director

- Born: 1951 (age 74–75); Italy
- Occupations: Film maker and Independent Producer
- Years active: late 1970s – present

Adriana Monti (born 1951) is an Italian-Canadian film director, independent producer, and screenwriter. She is known for making feminist films. Her films include Scuola senza fine (1983), Filo a catena (1986) and Gentili signore (1989).

== Biography ==
Adriana Monti was born in 1951 and has been making independent feminist films since the late 1970s. Much of her filmmaking is collaborative. She began her career in the context of a larger feminist movement in Italy of the 1970s. For her 1983 film Scuola senza fine (School without End), she put together a group of amateur women to make the film. The group of former housewives had completed a 150-hour secondary school diploma course in 1976 and did not want to stop learning after it ended. With the help of their teacher, they formed a study and research group. Monti shot the film about them from 1979 to 1981, with the first half of it being made collectively by the group. It was completed in 1983. In 1986, Monti and other Italian feminists such as Lea Melandri made a documentary called Filo a catena about the conditions of female textile workers. Monti was also a contributor to the feminist magazine Lapis which was directed by Lea Melandri until 1996.

Adriana Monti moved to Canada in 1996. She worked as reporter and story producer at OMNI Television Rogers Media, and started her own company A&Z Media Ltd. She produced in 2012 Ice Work (a Mark Thompson's Chalmers Award Project), a series of shorts Never too Late to Create, and in 2010 Three Women, Adapting Life, Adopting Lines broadcast by OMNI (Mexico Film Festival, Miami women Film Festival, Italian-Canadian Writer Panel Halifax 2012). Her previous videos and films are still shown in festivals around of the world and won several awards. In 2012 Scuola Senza Fine was presented at the Museo Reina Sofia in Madrid, in 2008 it was at "The Way Things Are" Works From The Thyssen-Bornemisza Art Contemporary Collection, Centre of Contemporary Art 'Znaki Czasu', Torun, Poland. Her experimental films from the 70s Sul Filo del Desidero, Ciclo Continuo, I Bagagli, Il Piacere del Testo, Andata e Ritorno had been used by film maker Alina Marazzi in her film "Vogliamo anche le rose" (2008). The Italian shorts Trame, Scuola Senza Fine, Filo A Catena, Ritratti, and the fiction film Gentili Signore were well received at International and National Film Festivals (Pesaro, Bellaria, Sorrento, Catania, Milan, The Cairo, Annecy, Créteil, Brussels, Montreal, New York, Barcelona, Hamburg).

== Filmography ==
- The Semiotones (2016)
- Famiglia (2015) 5 Episodes for OMNI TV
- What is Love? (2015)
- Never Too Late (2012) in collaboration with musician Ruth Budd
- Ice Work (2012) in collaboration with artist Mark Thompson
- Three women, Adapting Lives Adopting Lines (2010)
- Note su Milano (1996)
- Luigi Micheletti racconta ...(1995)
- Morimondo (Cistercense's Abbey) (1993)
- Ritratti (Portraits), Belle le mie amiche (1991)
- Gentili signore (1988)
- Filo a catena (1986)
- Tracce sulla pelle incantata (1984)
- Spazi vocale (1984)
- Una scuola di cinema a Milano (1983)
- Scuola senza fine (1983)
- Trame (1982)

== See also ==
- Cinema of Italy
- List of female film and television directors
