= The Lion, the Witch and the Wardrobe =

1950 children's novel by C. S. Lewis

- First edition dustjacket
- Author: C. S. Lewis
- Illustrator: Pauline Baynes
- Cover artist: Pauline Baynes
- Language: English
- Series: The Chronicles of Narnia
- Release number: 1
- Genre: Children's fantasy, Christian literature
- Set in: Narnia
- Publisher: Geoffrey Bles
- Publication date: 16 October 1950
- Publication place: United Kingdom
- Media type: Print (hardcover and paperback), e-book
- Pages: 172 pp (first edition)
- OCLC: 7207376
- LC Class: PZ8.L48 Li
- Followed by: Prince Caspian

The Lion, the Witch and the Wardrobe is a portal fantasy novel written by British author C. S. Lewis, published by Geoffrey Bles in 1950. It is the first published and best known of seven novels in The Chronicles of Narnia (1950–1956). Among all the author's books, it is also the most widely held in libraries. It was the first of The Chronicles of Narnia to be written and published, but is marked as volume two in recent editions that are sequenced according to the stories' internal chronology. Like the other Chronicles, it was illustrated by Pauline Baynes, and her work has been retained in many later editions.

Most of the novel is set in Narnia, a land of talking animals and mythical creatures that is ruled by the evil White Witch. The beginning is set in England, where four English children are relocated to a large, old country house following a wartime evacuation. The youngest, Lucy, visits Narnia three times via the magic of a wardrobe in a spare room. Lucy's three siblings are with her on her third visit to Narnia. In Narnia, the siblings seem fit to fulfil an old prophecy and find themselves adventuring to save Narnia and their own lives. The lion Aslan gives his life to save one of the children; he later rises from the dead, vanquishes the White Witch, and crowns the children Kings and Queens of Narnia.

Lewis wrote the book for (and dedicated it to) his goddaughter, Lucy Barfield. She was the daughter of Owen Barfield, Lewis's friend, teacher, adviser and trustee. In 2003, The Lion, the Witch and the Wardrobe was ranked ninth on the BBC's The Big Read poll. Time magazine included the novel in its list of the 100 Best Young-Adult Books of All Time, as well as its list of the 100 best English-language novels published since 1923.

== Plot ==
Peter, Susan, Edmund and Lucy Pevensie are evacuated from London in 1940, to escape the Blitz, and sent to live with an elderly Professor at a large house in the English countryside. While exploring the house, Lucy enters a wardrobe and discovers the magical world of Narnia. Here, she meets the faun named Tumnus, whom she addresses as "Mr Tumnus". Tumnus invites her to his cave for tea and admits that he had intended to report Lucy to the White Witch, the false ruler of Narnia who has kept the land in perpetual winter, but he repents and guides her back home. Although Lucy's siblings initially disbelieve her story of Narnia, Edmund follows her into the wardrobe, finds himself in a separate area of Narnia and meets the White Witch, who calls herself the Queen of Narnia. The Witch plies Edmund with Turkish delight and persuades him to bring his siblings to her with the promise of being made a prince. Edmund reunites with Lucy and they return home. However, Edmund denies Narnia's existence to Peter and Susan after learning of the White Witch's identity from Lucy.

Soon afterwards, all four children enter Narnia together, but find that Tumnus has been arrested for treason. The children are befriended by Mr and Mrs Beaver, who tell them of a prophecy that the White Witch's rule will end when "two Sons of Adam and two Daughters of Eve" sit on the four thrones of Cair Paravel, and that Narnia's true ruler – a great lion named Aslan – is returning after several years' absence, and will go to the Stone Table. Edmund slips away to the White Witch's castle, where he finds a courtyard filled with the Witch's enemies turned into stone statues. Edmund reports Aslan's return to the White Witch, who begins her movement towards the Stone Table with Edmund in tow, and orders the execution of Edmund's siblings and the Beavers. Meanwhile, the Beavers realise where Edmund has gone, and lead the children to meet Aslan at the Stone Table. On the way they meet Father Christmas, who has been kept out of Narnia by the Witch's magic, and he leaves the group with magical gifts, including weapons. Meanwhile, the White Witch and her party realise that the snow is melting, and they have to abandon the sledge.

The children and the Beavers reach the Stone Table and meet Aslan and his army. The White Witch's wolf captain Maugrim approaches the camp and attacks Susan, but is killed by Peter. The White Witch arrives and parleys with Aslan, invoking the "Deep Magic from the Dawn of Time" which gives her the right to kill Edmund for his treason. Aslan then speaks to the Witch alone, and on his return he announces that the Witch has renounced her claim on Edmund's life. Aslan and his followers then move the encampment into the nearby forest. That evening, Susan and Lucy secretly follow Aslan to the Stone Table. They watch from a distance as the Witch puts Aslan to death, as they had agreed in their pact to spare Edmund. The next morning, Aslan is resurrected by the "Deeper Magic from before the Dawn of Time", which has the power to reverse death if a willing victim takes the place of a traitor. Aslan takes the girls to the Witch's castle and revives the Narnians that the Witch had turned to stone. They join the Narnian forces battling the Witch's army. The Narnian army prevails, and Aslan kills the Witch. The Pevensie children are then crowned kings and queens of Narnia at Cair Paravel.

After a long and happy reign, the Pevensies, now adults, go on a hunt for the White Stag who is said to grant the wishes of those who catch it. The four arrive at the lamp-post marking Narnia's entrance and, having forgotten about it, unintentionally pass through the wardrobe and return to England; they are children again, with no time having passed since their departure. They tell the story to the Professor, who believes them and reassures the children that they will return to Narnia one day when they least expect it.

== Main characters ==
- Lucy is the youngest of four siblings. In some respects, she is the primary character of the story. She is the first to discover the land of Narnia, which she enters inadvertently when she steps into a wardrobe while exploring the Professor's house. When Lucy tells her three siblings about Narnia, they do not believe her: Peter and Susan think she is just playing a game, while Edmund persistently ridicules her. In Narnia, she is crowned Queen Lucy the Valiant.
- Edmund is the third-eldest of four siblings. He has a bad relationship with his brother and sisters. Edmund is known to be a liar, and often harasses Lucy. Lured by the White Witch's promise of power and an unlimited supply of Turkish delight, Edmund betrays his siblings. He later repents and helps defeat the White Witch. He is eventually crowned King Edmund the Just.
- Susan is the second-eldest sibling. She does not believe in Narnia until she actually goes there. She and Lucy accompany Aslan on the journey to the Stone Table, where he allows the Witch to take his life in place of Edmund's. Tending to Aslan's carcass, she removes a muzzle from him to restore his dignity and oversees a horde of mice who gnaw away his bonds. She then shares the joy of his resurrection and the endeavour to bring reinforcements to a critical battle. Susan is crowned Queen Susan the Gentle.
- Peter is the eldest sibling. He judiciously settles disputes between his younger brother and sisters, often rebuking Edmund for his attitude. Peter also disbelieves Lucy's stories about Narnia until he sees it for himself. He is hailed as a hero for the slaying of Maugrim and for his command in the battle to overthrow the White Witch. He is crowned High King of Narnia and dubbed King Peter the Magnificent.
- Aslan, a lion, is the rightful King of Narnia and other magic countries. He sacrifices himself to save Edmund, but is resurrected in time to aid the denizens of Narnia and the Pevensie children against the White Witch and her minions. As the "son of the Emperor-beyond-the-Sea" (an allusion to God the Father), Aslan is the all-powerful creator of Narnia. Lewis revealed that he wrote Aslan as a portrait, although not an allegorical portrait, of Christ.
- The White Witch is the land's self-proclaimed queen and the primary antagonist of the story. Her reign in Narnia has made winter persist for a hundred years with no end in sight. When provoked, she turns creatures to stone with her wand. She fears the fulfilment of a prophecy that "two sons of Adam and two daughters of Eve" (meaning two male humans and two female humans) will supplant her. She is usually referred to as "the White Witch", or just "the Witch". Her actual name, Jadis, appears once in the notice left on Tumnus's door after his arrest. Lewis later wrote a prequel to include her back story and account for her presence in the Narnian world.
- The Professor is a kindly old gentleman who takes the children in when they are evacuated from London. He is the first to believe that Lucy did indeed visit a land called Narnia. He tries to convince the others logically that she did not make it up. After the children return from Narnia, he assures them that they will return one day. The book hints that he knows more of Narnia than he lets on (hints expanded upon in later books of the series).
- Tumnus, a faun, is the first individual Lucy (who calls him "Mr Tumnus") meets in Narnia. Tumnus befriends Lucy, despite the White Witch's standing order to turn in any human he finds. He initially plans to obey the order but, after getting to like Lucy, he cannot bear to alert the Witch's forces. He instead escorts her back towards the safety of her own country. His good deed is later given away to the Witch by Edmund. The witch orders Tumnus arrested and turns him to stone, but he is later restored to life by Aslan.
- Mr and Mrs Beaver, two beavers, are friends of Tumnus. They play host to Peter, Susan, Lucy, and Edmund (who soon left when he heard the word "Aslan" and joined the Witch) and lead them to Aslan.

== Writing ==
Lewis described the origin of The Lion, the Witch and the Wardrobe in an essay titled "It All Began with a Picture":

The Lion all began with a picture of a Faun carrying an umbrella and parcels in a snowy wood. This picture had been in my mind since I was about 16. Then one day, when I was about 40, I said to myself: 'Let's try to make a story about it.'

At the beginning of the Second World War, many British children were evacuated from London and other cities to the countryside to escape bombing attacks by Nazi Germany. On 2 September 1939, three schoolgirls, Margaret, Mary and Katherine, came to live at The Kilns in Risinghurst, Lewis's home 3 mi (4.8 km) east of Oxford city centre. Lewis later suggested that the experience gave him a new appreciation of children, and in late September he began a children's story on an odd sheet that has survived as part of another manuscript:

This book is about four children whose names were Ann, Martin, Rose and Peter. But it is most about Peter, who was the youngest. They all had to go away from London suddenly because of Air Raids, and because Father, who was in the Army, had gone off to the War and Mother was doing some kind of war work. They were sent to stay with a kind of relation of Mother's who was a very old professor who lived all by himself in the country.

How much more of the story Lewis then wrote is uncertain. Roger Lancelyn Green thinks that he might even have completed it. In September 1947, Lewis wrote in a letter about stories for children: "I have tried one myself, but it was, by the unanimous verdict of my friends, so bad that I destroyed it."

The plot element of entering a new world through the back of a wardrobe had certainly entered Lewis's mind by 1946, when he used it to describe his first encounter with really good poetry:

I did not in the least feel that I was getting in more quantity or better quality a pleasure I had already known. It was more as if a cupboard which one had hitherto valued as a place for hanging coats proved one day, when you opened the door, to lead to the garden of the Hesperides ...

In August 1948, during a visit by an American writer, Chad Walsh, Lewis talked vaguely about completing a children's book he had begun "in the tradition of E. Nesbit". After this conversation, not much happened until the beginning of the next year. Then everything changed. In his essay "It All Began With a Picture", Lewis continues: "At first I had very little idea how the story would go. But then suddenly Aslan came bounding into it. I think I had been having a good many dreams of lions about that time. Apart from that, I don't know where the Lion came from or why he came. But once he was there, he pulled the whole story together, and soon he pulled the six other Narnian stories in after him."

The major ideas of the book echo lines Lewis had written 14 years earlier in his alliterative poem "The Planets":

... Of wrath ended
And woes mended, of winter passed
And guilt forgiven, and good fortune
Jove is master; and of jocund revel,
Laughter of ladies. The lion-hearted
... are Jove's children.

This resonance is a central component of the case, promoted chiefly by Oxford University scholar Michael Ward, for the seven Chronicles having been modelled upon the seven classical astrological planets, The Lion, the Witch and the Wardrobe being based on Jupiter.

On 10 March 1949, Roger Lancelyn Green dined with Lewis at Magdalen College. After the meal, Lewis read two chapters from his new children's story to Green. Lewis asked Green's opinion of the tale, and Green said that he thought it was good. The manuscript of The Lion, the Witch and the Wardrobe was complete by the end of March 1949. Lucy Barfield received it by the end of May. When on 16 October 1950 Geoffrey Bles in London published the first edition, three new "chronicles", Prince Caspian, The Voyage of the Dawn Treader, and The Horse and His Boy, had also been completed.

== Illustrations ==
Lewis's publisher, Geoffrey Bles, allowed him to choose the illustrator for the novel and the Narnia series. Lewis chose Pauline Baynes, possibly on J. R. R. Tolkien's recommendation. In December 1949, Bles showed Lewis the first drawings for the novel, and Lewis sent Baynes a note congratulating her, particularly on the level of detail. Lewis's appreciation of the illustrations is evident in a letter he wrote to Baynes after The Last Battle won the Carnegie Medal for best children's book of 1956: "is it not rather 'our' medal? I'm sure the illustrations were taken into account, as well as the text."

== Reception ==
Lewis very much enjoyed writing The Lion, the Witch and the Wardrobe and embarked on the sequel Prince Caspian soon after finishing the first novel. He completed the sequel by the end of 1949, less than a year after finishing the initial book. The Lion, the Witch and the Wardrobe had few readers during 1949 and was not published until late 1950, so his initial enthusiasm did not stem from favourable reception by the public.

While Lewis is known today on the strength of the Narnia stories as a highly successful children's writer, the initial critical response was muted. At the time, realistic children's stories were in fashion, while fantasy and fairy tales were seen as indulgent, appropriate only for very young readers and potentially harmful to older children, even hindering their ability to relate to everyday life. Some reviewers considered the tale overly moralistic, or the Christian elements overstated attempts to indoctrinate children. Others were concerned that the many violent incidents might frighten children.

Lewis's publisher, Geoffrey Bles, feared that the Narnia tales would not sell, and might damage Lewis's reputation and affect sales of his other books. Nevertheless, the novel and its successors were highly popular with young readers, and Lewis's publisher was soon eager to release further Narnia stories.

A 2004 U.S. study found that The Lion was a common read-aloud book for seventh graders in schools in San Diego County, California. In 2005, it was included in Time's unranked list of the 100 best English-language novels published since 1923. On the basis of a 2007 online poll, the U.S. National Education Association listed it as one of its "Teachers' Top 100 Books for Children". In 2012, it was ranked number five among all-time children's novels in a survey published by School Library Journal, a monthly with a primarily U.S. readership.

A 2012 survey by the University of Worcester determined that it was the second most common book that UK adults had read as children, after Alice's Adventures in Wonderland. (Adults, perhaps limited to parents, ranked Alice and The Lion fifth and sixth as books the next generation should read, or their children should read during their lifetimes.)

TIME included the novel in its "All-TIME 100 Novels" (best English-language novels from 1923 to 2005). In 2003, the novel was listed at number 9 on the BBC's survey The Big Read. It has also been published in 47 foreign languages.

== Reading order ==
The matter of the reading order of the Narnia series, in the context of the change in their publication order – from its original (beginning with The Lion, the Witch and the Wardrobe) to the later-adopted, now pervasive chronology-of-events order (beginning with The Magician's Nephew) – has been a matter of extensive discussion for many years. The books were not created as a series, and the name "The Chronicles of Narnia" was suggested by Roger Lancelyn Green as a collective title as there was no specific reading order . The Lion... was originally published as the first book in what became known as "the Chronicles", and most reprintings of the novels reflected that order, until departure with the Collins "Fontana Lions" edition in 1980. Change, however, had begun earlier – the listing of the books in the English Puffins editions as early as 1974 presented a list as a suggested reading order that placed Magician's first – and with the Collins edition the move to the chronological order, and the series opening with Magician's, was formalised. Walter Hooper, for one, was pleased with this, stating that the books could now be read in the order that Lewis himself "said they should". When HarperCollins presented its uniform, worldwide edition of the series in 1994, it also used this sequence, going so far as to state that its "editions of the Chronicles ... have been numbered in compliance with the original wishes of the author, C.S. Lewis."

In a work of literary criticism, Imagination and the Arts in C. S. Lewis, scholar Peter J. Schakel calls into question the clarity and simplicity of these conclusions, citing a variety of evidence that opposes a singular view of a correct viewing order, pieces of evidence that include Lewis's own words. Laurence Krieg, a young fan, wrote to Lewis, asking him to adjudicate between views of the correct sequence of reading the novels; he held to reading The Magician's... first, while his mother thought The Lion... should be read first. Lewis wrote back, stating support for the younger Krieg's views, but called rigid conclusions into question, stating: "I think I agree with your order ... [but] perhaps it does not matter very much in which order anyone reads them."

I think I agree with your order for reading the books more than with your mother's. The series was not planned beforehand as she thinks. When I wrote The Lion, I did not know I was going to write any more. Then I wrote P. Caspian as a sequel and still didn't think there would be any more, and when I had done The Voyage, I felt quite sure it would be the last, but I found I was wrong. So perhaps it does not matter very much in which order anyone reads them. I'm not even sure that all the others were written in the same order in which they were published. I never keep notes of that sort of thing and never remember dates.

— C. S. Lewis to Laurence Krieg, an American fan, 23 April 1957

Schakel's writings go on to pointedly question the revised order in literary-critical analyses that recognise the view of Hooper, documents such as the Krieg letter, as well as the commercial inclinations behind the creation of later editions of works in a unique order, but nevertheless argue strenuously with regard to the change in the "imaginative reading experience" in the later revised arrangement, the key difference being that, in the original publication order, the land of Narnia is carefully introduced in The Lion... (e.g., the children hearing the term and having to have it explained), whereas The Magician's... has Narnia mentioned on the first page, without explanation; a similar disconnection is noted with regard to how the central character Aslan is experienced in the two reading orders. Schakel argues the matter through repeated further examples (e.g., the appearances of the lamp-post, the delineation of the characters of the White Witch and Jadis), concluding that "the 'new' arrangement may well be less desirable that the original". Writer Paul Ford likewise cites several scholars who have weighed in against the decision of HarperCollins to present the books in the order of their internal chronology, and continues, "most scholars disagree with this decision and find it the least faithful to Lewis's deepest intentions".

Critically, the reissue of the Puffin series in England, which was proceeding at the time of Lewis's death in 1963 (with three volumes, beginning with The Lion..., already out, and the remaining four due soon) maintained the original order, with contemporary comments ascribed to Lewis – made to Kaye Webb, the editor of that imprint – suggesting he intended "to re-edit the books ... [to] connect the things that didn't tie up". Regardless, as at January 2022, the publication order placing The Lion, the Witch and the Wardrobe second in the series continues – in accord with Walter Hooper's perception of Lewis's intent, whether intended with or without further series changes – so that it remains the production design for the series as it is distributed worldwide.

== Allusions ==
Lewis wrote, "The Narnian books are not as much allegory as supposal. Suppose there were a Narnian world and it, like ours, needed redemption. What kind of incarnation and Passion might Christ be supposed to undergo there?"

The main story is an allegory of Christ's crucifixion: Aslan sacrifices himself for Edmund, a traitor who may deserve death, in the same way that Christians believe Jesus sacrificed himself for sinners. Aslan is killed on the Stone Table, symbolising Mosaic Law, which breaks when he is resurrected, symbolising the replacement of the strict justice of Old Testament law with redeeming grace and forgiveness granted on the basis of substitutionary atonement, according to Christian theology.

The character of the Professor is based on W. T. Kirkpatrick, who tutored a 16-year-old Lewis. "Kirk", as he was sometimes called, taught the young Lewis much about thinking and communicating clearly, skills that would be invaluable to him later.

Narnia is caught in endless winter that has lasted a century when the children first enter. Norse tradition mythologises a "great winter", known as the Fimbulwinter, said to precede Ragnarök. The trapping of Edmund by the White Witch is reminiscent of the seduction and imprisonment of Kai by the Snow Queen in Hans Christian Andersen's novella of that name.

Several parallels are seen between the White Witch and the immortal white queen, Ayesha, of H. Rider Haggard's She, a novel greatly admired by Lewis.

Edith Nesbit's short story "The Aunt and Amabel" includes the motif of a girl entering a wardrobe to gain access to a magical place.

The freeing of Aslan's body from the Stone Table is reminiscent of a scene from Edgar Allan Poe's story "The Pit and the Pendulum", in which a prisoner is freed when rats gnaw through his bonds. In a later book, Prince Caspian, as reward for their actions, mice gained the same intelligence and speech as other Narnian animals.

== Religious themes ==
One of the most significant themes seen in C. S. Lewis's The Lion, The Witch and The Wardrobe is Christianity. Various aspects of characters and events in the novel reflect biblical ideas from Christianity. The lion Aslan is one of the clearest examples, as his death is very similar to that of Jesus Christ. While many readers made this connection, Lewis denied that the themes of Christianity were intentional, saying that his writing began by picturing images of characters, and the rest just came about through the writing process. While Lewis denied intentionally making the story a strictly Christian theological novel, he did admit that it could help young children accept Christianity into their lives when they were older.

After the children enter the world of Narnia through the wardrobe, Edmund finds himself in trouble under the service of the White Witch, as she tempts him with Turkish delight. When Edmund is threatened with death, Aslan offers to sacrifice himself as an atonement for the boy's betrayal. Aslan is shaved of his fur, and stabbed on an altar of stone. This is similar to how Jesus was publicly beaten, humiliated and crucified. After his sacrifice, Aslan comes back to life, and he continues to help the children save Narnia. While this sequence of events is comparable to the death of Jesus, it is not identical to it. A few differences exist, such as the fact that Aslan did not allow himself to be killed to save the entirety of Narnia, but only to save Edmund. Aslan is also only dead for one night, while Jesus returned on the third day. Despite these differences, the image of Aslan and the event of his death and rebirth reflect those of the biblical account of Jesus's death and resurrection, adding to the theme of Christianity throughout the novel.

== Differences between editions ==
Because of labour union rules, the text of The Lion, the Witch and the Wardrobe was reset for the publication of the first American edition by Macmillan US in 1950. Lewis took that opportunity to make these changes to the original British edition published by Geoffrey Bles earlier that same year:

- In chapter 1 of the American edition, the animals in which Edmund and Susan express interest are snakes and foxes rather than the foxes and rabbits of the British edition.
- In chapter 6 of the American edition, the name of the White Witch's chief of police is changed to "Fenris Ulf" from "Maugrim" in the British.
- In chapter 13 of the American edition, "the trunk of the World Ash Tree" takes the place of "the fire-stones of the Secret Hill".

When HarperCollins took over publication of the series in 1994, they began using the original British edition for all subsequent English editions worldwide. The current U.S. edition published by Scholastic has 36,135 words.

== Adaptations ==
=== Television ===
The story has been adapted for television three times. The first was a 10-part serial produced by ABC Weekend Television for ITV and broadcast in 1967. This version was adapted by Trevor Preston and directed by Helen Standage.

In 1979, an animated TV miniseries, directed by Peanuts director Bill Melendez, was broadcast and won the first Emmy Award for Outstanding Animated Program.

A third television adaptation was produced in 1988 by the BBC using a combination of live actors, animatronic puppets, and animation. The 1988 adaptation was the first of a series of four Narnia adaptations over three seasons. The programme was nominated for an Emmy Award for Outstanding Children's Program and received a nomination for Best Children's Programme (Entertainment/Drama) at the British Academy Television Awards in 1989. Lighting director John Mason won the BAFTA TV Craft Award for Best Video Lighting for his work on the production.

=== Theatre ===
Stage adaptations include a 1984 version staged at London's Westminster Theatre, produced by Vanessa Ford Productions. The play, adapted by Glyn Robbins, was directed by Richard Williams and designed by Marty Flood. Jules Tasca, Ted Drachman, and Thomas Tierney collaborated on a musical adaptation published in 1986.

A one-act stage adaptation was written by Le Clanché du Rand and published in 1989. The play has been produced several times in the United States.

In 1997, Trumpets Inc., a Filipino Christian theatre and musical production company, produced a musical rendition that Douglas Gresham, Lewis's stepson (and co-producer of the Walden Media film adaptations), has openly declared that he feels is the closest to Lewis's intention. It starred among others popular young Filipino singer Sam Concepcion as Edmund Pevensie.

In 1998, the Royal Shakespeare Company performed an adaptation by Adrian Mitchell, for which the acting edition has been published. In January 2009, Mitchell's play was performed by Antic Disposition St Stephen's Church in Belsize Park, London. The Stratford Festival in Canada mounted a new production of Mitchell's work in June 2016.

In 2002, an Australian commercial musical production by Malcolm Cooke Productions toured the country, using both life-sized puppets and human actors. It was directed by notable film director Nadia Tass, and starred Amanda Muggleton, Dennis Olsen, Meaghan Davies, and Yolande Brown. The libretto was written by Tass's husband and creative partner, David Parker, and the musical earned nominations in the Helpmann Awards for the Best Direction in a Musical as well as Best Presentation for Children awards in April 2003.

In August 2009 WendyBird Productions put on a show at Edinburgh Fringe. In December 2009, Theresa Heskins produced and directed a new version at the New Vic Theatre in Newcastle-under-Lyme, England.

In 2012, Michael Fentiman with Rupert Goold co-directed The Lion, the Witch and the Wardrobe at a Threesixty "tented production" in Kensington Gardens, London. It received a Guardian three-star review.

A new stage adaptation debuted at Leeds Playhouse in 2017. The production then transferred to London's Bridge Theatre in 2019. In November 2021, the show began a tour across the U.K. and transferred to the West End's Gillian Lynne Theatre for an engagement lasting from 28 July (previews from 18 July) 2022 to 8 January 2023. Directed by Michael Fentiman, the production stars Samantha Womack as the White Witch; Ammar Duffus, Robyn Sinclair, Shaka Kalokoh, and Delainey Hayles as the Pevensie siblings; and Chris Jared as Aslan.

=== Film ===
In 2005, the story was adapted for a theatrical film, co-produced by Walt Disney Pictures and Walden Media. It was followed by two more films: The Chronicles of Narnia: Prince Caspian and The Chronicles of Narnia: The Voyage of the Dawn Treader, the latter of which was produced by 20th Century Fox instead of Disney.

After Walden Media's contract of The Chronicles of Narnia film rights expired in 2011, the C. S. Lewis Company announced in October 2013 that it had agreed with The Mark Gordon Company to adapt the 1953 novel The Silver Chair, the fourth published and sixth chronological novel in the children's book series. In July 2023, following the release of Barbie, it was announced that Greta Gerwig had signed a deal with Netflix to write and direct two films based on the book series The Chronicles of Narnia, with Gordon, Douglas Gresham, Amy Pascal, and Sieber serving as producers. Narnia: The Magician's Nephew is scheduled to be released theatrically worldwide excluding France on February 12, before streaming on Netflix on April 2. It will be the first film by Netflix to receive a wide theatrical release.
