= The Lion, the Witch and the Wardrobe (1989 play) =

- Original language: English
- Written by: Le Clanché du Rand
- Characters: Lucy, White Witch, others; Peter, Aslan, others; (two actors)
- Genre: One-act adaptation of a children's fantasy novel
- Setting: Narnia (world)

Premiere
- Date: 1989

The Lion, the Witch and the Wardrobe is a 1989 American dramatization of The Lion, the Witch and the Wardrobe by C.S. Lewis, the 1950 British children's novel that inaugurated The Chronicles of Narnia.

== Description ==
The Lion, the Witch and the Wardrobe is a one-act play for two actors, written by Le Clanché du Rand and published in 1989 by Dramatic Publishing of Woodstock, Illinois. It is aimed at school-age audiences, and licensed by Dramatic to theaters worldwide.

The play premiered in 1989

== Notable productions ==
- 2011 & 2014: Off-Broadway at St. Luke's Theatre, New York, directed by Julia Beardsley O'Brien, featuring Rockford Sansom and Abigail Taylor-Sansom
- 2013: Marin Theatre Company in Mill Valley, California, directed by Jessa Berkner and featuring Reggie White and Elena Wright
- 2014: South Carolina Children's Theater in Greenville, South Carolina, part of their touring roster for the 2014–2015 season
