= Lea Melandri =

Italian writer and journalist (born 1941)

- Born: Maddalena Melandri; 1941 (age 84–85); Fusignano, Kingdom of Italy
- Education: Scuola Normale Superiore di Pisa; University of Bologna
- Scientific career
- Workplaces: Free University for Women

Lea Melandri (born 1941) is an Italian feminist scholar, journalist and writer. She is one of the leading feminists in Italy and is part of the second-wave feminist movement. She has established various magazines and published books on feminist theory.

== Biography ==
Melandri was born in Fusignano in 1941. She graduated from Scuola Normale Superiore di Pisa. Following her graduation she worked as a teacher. Next she obtained her master's degree in history from the University of Bologna. Then she continued to teach at secondary schools until her retirement in 1986.

Melandri and Elvio Fachinelli started a radical feminist journal L’erba voglio in 1971 and edited it until 1978 when it folded. Melandri established a feminist magazine, Lapis, in 1987 which existed until 1997. She published articles in Noi donne, a feminist magazine. She and other Milan-based Italian feminists, including Ciulia Alberti, Paola Melchiori and Adriana Monti, organized activities with housewives and factory workers between 1979 and 1983.

Her book L’infamia originaria was published in 1977. Her another book was translated into English under the title of Love and Violence: The Vexatious Factors of Civilization in 2019. She has also written poems. She has contributed to the daily newspaper Il manifesto, and in one of her articles she bitterly criticized Pope Benedict XVI in 2004 due to his letter containing a conservative and traditionalist view about women.

Melandri teaches at Free University for Women in Milan of which she has been the president since 2011.

Melandri is a member of the Global Information Society Watch.
