= Lucy Barfield =

Godchild of C.S. Lewis (1935–2003)

- Born: 2 November 1935; Carlisle, England
- Died: 3 May 2003 (aged 67); London, England
- Known for: Lent her name to Lucy Pevensie in Narnia series
- Relatives: C. S. Lewis (godfather)

Lucy Barfield (2 November 1935 – 3 May 2003) was the godchild of C. S. Lewis. The Lion, the Witch and the Wardrobe is dedicated to Lucy, who also lent her name to the book's heroine, Lucy Pevensie.

== Lewis's letter ==
Lewis's letter and the dedication to The Lion, the Witch and the Wardrobe reads:

My Dear Lucy,

I wrote this story for you, but when I began it I had not realized that girls grow quicker than books. As a result, you are already too old for fairy tales, and by the time it is printed and bound you will be older still. But some day you will be old enough to start reading fairy tales again. You can then take it down from some upper shelf, dust it, and tell me what you think of it. I shall probably be too deaf to hear, and too old to understand a word you say but I shall still be,

your affectionate Godfather,

C. S. Lewis.

== Life ==
In 1923 Owen Barfield, who had been friends with Lewis since 1919, married musician and choreographer Maud Douie (1888–1980). They had three children: Alexander, born in 1928, his adopted sister Lucy, born on 2 November 1935 and Geoffrey, born in 1940, who was a foster child. In May 1949, Lewis sent Lucy the completed manuscript of The Lion, the Witch and the Wardrobe with a letter in which he wrote that the book was originally written for her. On 16 October 1950, when the book was officially published in London, this letter was printed as its dedication. In September 1952, Lewis dedicated his The Voyage of the Dawn Treader to Lucy's brother Geoffrey.

Lucy was born in Carlisle, Cumberland and adopted by the Barfields at the age of two. She was a lively, friendly and happy child. From an early age she trained to be a ballet dancer. She showed musical taste and ability. In about 1958 she became a qualified dance and music teacher and in 1960 her sinfonietta in three movements was publicly performed at Malvern College. She taught piano and dance at a Kentish school for girls, then at a specially-built chalet in the garden of her family home, Westfield, in Hartley, Kent.

She was interested in her father's work and accompanied him in 1965–66 during his second visiting professorship in America at Brandeis University. Lucy Barfield, then 30 years old, was a piano teacher of twelve students at the local music school in Cambridge, Massachusetts. In June at the end of the school year Lucy's mother, Maud, joined them and, as part of their holiday, the three went together to visit Owen Barfield's friend Professor Craig Miller in Vancouver. Upon their return to England, Lucy was diagnosed with multiple sclerosis.

She had already been feeling some MS symptoms since 1963, the year C. S. Lewis died. At first, she continued dancing and teaching. Later, she could not leave her home and finally not even her bed. In 1968 Lucy was hospitalised and in 1977 she was hospitalised for the second time. She was able to leave the hospital in June 1978, when she married Bevan Rake (1921–1990). In 1990, after Bevan died, Lucy returned to the hospital permanently.

== Failing health ==
For the last five years of her life she was unable to move, speak or feed herself. Walter Hooper writes in his obituary and also Paul Ford notes it in his Companion to Narnia: "As every creature comfort was taken from her, Lucy's faith in God grew and blessed not only her, but also those who knew her. Owen Barfield, touched by her humility, said many times, 'I could go down on my knees before my daughter.'"

== Death ==
Her mother died in 1980, and her father in 1997. Her brother Alexander visited her often. She liked to listen to Geoffrey reading her The Chronicles of Narnia. Lucy Barfield died at the Royal Hospital for Neuro-disability in south west London on 3 May 2003, having lived with multiple sclerosis for almost 40 years.
