= Naples (film) =

- Directed by: Louis Lumière
- Starring: Non-professional actors: various passengers and passers-by.
- Cinematography: Lumière Brothers
- Edited by: Lumière Brothers
- Color process: Black and white
- Release date: 1898
- Running time: 2 minutes
- Country: France

Naples is an 1898 silent documentary short shot of Naples by the Lumière Brothers. The film played and important role for the history of Neapolitan cinema, being one of the first if not the first shot at Naples on video, while also being one of the first films shot by the Lumière Brothers.

== Plot ==
The film is made up of various shots taken in via Marina, via Toledo, at the port with a view of Vesuvius and finally in Borgo Santa Lucia.
