= David Lavery =

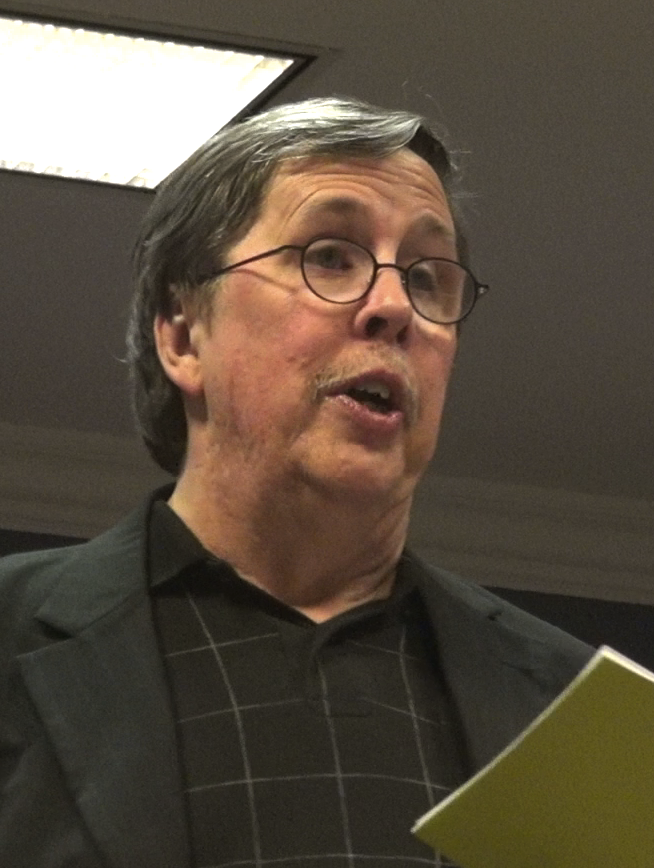
Lavery at a conference in New Orleans in 2011

David Lavery (August 27, 1949 – August 30, 2016) was an American linguist and professor of English at Middle Tennessee State University who specialized in studying pop culture, especially television. From 2006 to 2008 he served as Chair in Film & Television at Brunel University in London. He authored or edited over 20 books on popular culture, including Conversations with Joss Whedon.

He co-produced (with George Tennyson) Owen Barfield: Man and Meaning (1994; directed and edited by Ben Levin), a documentary portrait of Owen Barfield.

Lavery was considered an expert on several television series, including The Sopranos, Lost, and Buffy the Vampire Slayer.

== Partial bibliography ==
=== Authored works ===
- Late for the Sky: The Mentality of the Space Age

=== Edited works ===
- Conversations with Joss Whedon
- Seinfeld: Master of its Domain
- Deny All Knowledge: Reading The X-Files
- Fighting the Forces
- Reading the Sopranos
- Reading Deadwood
- This Thing of Ours: Investigating the Sopranos
