= Carlo De Notaris =

Italian painter (1812–1888)

Carlo De Notaris (1812–1888) was an Italian painter, active in a Neoclassic style.

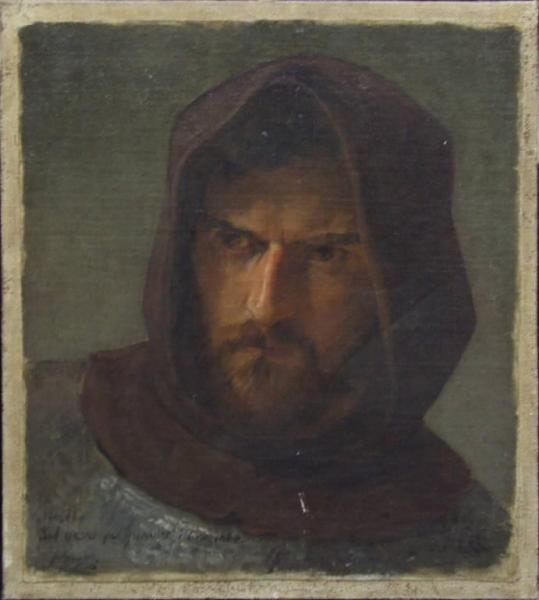
Carlo de Notaris by Francesco Hayez

He was born and died in Milan. He was a pupil of Carlo Bellosio and Francesco Hayez. His fellow students under Bellosio included Domenico Biraghi, Pedroli Carlo, Francioli Enrico, Carlo Corti, and Baldassare Verazzi.

A portrait of the artist by his master Hayez can be seen at the Brera Academy. His son, Stefano De Notaris, was a writer.
