= Eduardo Notari =

Italian actor (1903–1986)

- Born: 1 January 1903; Naples, Italy
- Died: 1986 (aged 83)
- Occupation: Actor
- Years active: 1912 - 1929 (film)

Eduardo Notari (1903–1986) was an Italian film actor of the silent era. Notari came from Naples, and most of the films he starred in were set in or around the city. His parent Elvira Notari and Nicola Notari ran the Dora Film studio. He began his career in 1912 as one of the first professional child actors in Italy.

== Selected filmography ==
- Soldier's Fantasy (1927)
- Italy Has Awakened (1927)

== Bibliography ==
- Bruno, Giuliana. Streetwalking on a Ruined Map: Cultural Theory and the City Films of Elvira Notari. Princeton University Press, 1993.
- Holmstrom, John. The Moving Picture Boy: An International Encyclopaedia from 1895 to 1995, Norwich, Michael Russell, 1996, pp. 20–21.
