= Nicola Notari =

Italian cinematographer and film director

- Occupation: Cinematographer
- Years active: 1911–1929 (film career)

Nicola Notari was an Italian cinematographer and film director. In 1902 he married director and screenwriter Elvira Notari, and in 1906 they founded and ran the Naples-based Dora Film company. They had three children including the actor Eduardo Notari.

== Selected filmography ==
- Soldier's Fantasy (1927)
- Italy Has Awakened (1927)

== Bibliography ==
- Maristella Cantini. Italian Women Filmmakers and the Gendered Screen. Palgrave Macmillan, 2013.
