= Gian Piero Brunetta =

Italian film critic and academic

Gian Piero Brunetta (Cesena, 20 May 1942) is an Italian film critic, film historian, and academic.

He is a Full Professor of Cinema History and Criticism at the University of Padua, he is known for being the author of an important four-volume work dedicated to the history of Italian cinema (Storia del cinema italiano, Editori Riuniti).

== Biography ==
Born to Venetian parents displaced during the Second World War, he graduated from the University of Padua in 1966 with a thesis on the formation of film theory and criticism in Italy in the 1930s and the genesis of the idea of neorealism. His training is led by masters such as Gianfranco Folena and Sergio Bettini: hence his semiotic and linguistic interests with those of narratology and contemporary art history.

From the second half of the seventies his work takes on a historical dimension.

He has directed various film series and has collaborated with the newspaper La Repubblica and with numerous Italian and foreign literary and film magazines.

He collaborated with the director Gianfranco Mingozzi for the television programs The Last Diva: Francesca Bertini (1982) and Stories of cinema and emigrants (1988), and was a consultant for the film Splendor (1988), by Ettore Scola.

He has curated major exhibitions on Italian art (Painting with light for the Palazzo Grassi exhibition; Italian art, 1900–1945, in 1989), as well as eleven videos for the exhibition La città del cinema di Cinecittà (1995).

He conceived and edited the Radiocelluloid radio broadcast and conceived and directed the exhibition The distant war (Museo della guerra, Rovereto, 1985).

In 1995 he was appointed commander of the Italian Republic. On November 16, 2017 he received the "Antonio Feltrinelli" award from the Accademia dei Lincei.

On 12 June 2001 he became a member of the Turin Academy of Sciences.

== Works ==
=== Author ===
- Umberto Barbaro e l'idea di neorealismo, Liviana, 1969.
- Forma e parola nel cinema, Liviana, 1970.
- Accostamento al cinema, Sagittaria, 1970.
- Hitchcock e l'universo della relatività, Deltatre, 1971.
- Intellettuali cinema e propaganda tra le due guerre, Pàtron, 1972.
- Nascita del racconto cinematografico, Patron, 1974.
- Cinema italiano tra le due guerre, Mursia, 1975.
- Miti modelli e organizzazione del consenso nel cinema fascista, Consorzio di pubblica lettura, 1976.
- Bolognini, Ministero degli Affari Esteri, 1977.
- Parabola del mito americano, Consorzio di pubblica lettura, 1978.
- Storia del cinema italiano, 1895–1945. vol. I, 1979.
- Roberto Rossellini, Ministero degli affari esteri, 1980.
- Cinema perduto, Milano, Feltrinelli, 1981.
- Storia del cinema italiano. Dal 1945 agli anni ottanta, Editori Riuniti, 1982.
- La guerra lontana, Rovereto, 1985.
- Buio in sala, Venezia, Marsilio Editori, 1989.
- Cent'anni di cinema italiano, Bari, Laterza, 1991.
- Storia del cinema italiano, II edizione. in IV volumi, Editori Riuniti, 1993.
- Spari nel buio, Venezia, Marsilio, 1994.
- Hitchcock, Venezia, Marsilio, 1995.
- Il viaggio dell'icononauta, Venezia, Marsilio, 1997.
- Gli intellettuali italiani e il cinema, Milano, Bruno Mondadori, 2004.
- Il cinema neorealista italiano, Bari, Editori Laterza, 2009.

=== Curator ===
- Umberto Barbaro, Neorealismo e realismo, Editori Riuniti, 1976.
- Lotte Eisner, Lo schermo demoniaco, Editori Riuniti, 1983.
- Stanley Kubrick, Tempo spazio, storia e mondi possibili, Pratiche, 1984.
- Paolo e Vittorio Taviani, E.T.R., 1986.
- Akira Kurosawa, Le radici e i ponti 1987.
- Cinema & Film Voll. I-III, Curcio, 1987.
- La città che sale (con Antonio Costa), 1990.
- Hollywood in Europa (con David Ellwood), La casa Usher, 1991.
- L'oro d'Africa del cinema italiano (con Jean Gili), Materiali di lavoro, 1991.
- L'Italia al cinema (con Livio Fantina), Venezia, 1992.
- La città del cinema, I primi cent'anni del cinema italiano, Skira, 1995.
- Cinetesori della Biennale, Marsilio Editori, 1996.
- Identità italiana e identità europea nel cinema italiano dal 1945 al miracolo economico, Fondazione Agnelli, 1996.
- Storia del cinema mondiale (5 tomi, a cura di), Einaudi, 1999–2001.
- Dizionario dei registi del cinema mondiale (3 tomi, a cura di), Einaudi, 2005–2006.
- Il cinema italiano contemporaneo, Laterza, Bari, 2007.
- Il cinema italiano muto, Laterza, Bari, 2008.
