= Lapis (magazine) =

Italian feminist magazine (1987-1996)

- Director: Lea Melandri
- Categories: Feminist magazine
- Frequency: Quarterly; Monthly
- Publisher: Tartaruga
- Founder: Lea Melandri
- Founded: 1987
- First issue: November 1987
- Final issue: December 1996
- Country: Italy
- Based in: Milan
- Language: Italian

Lapis was a feminist magazine based in Milan, Italy, with the subtitle Percorsi della riflessione femminile (Italian: Paths of female reflection). It was in circulation between 1987 and 1996.

== History and profile ==
Lapis was launched in 1987, and the first issue appeared in November that year. The founder was a feminist theorist, Lea Melandri. The magazine was started to document the women's transversal reflections and was an independent feminist publication.

The publisher of the magazine changed over time. A company in Milan, Faenza, was the publisher from June 1989. Then the magazine was published on a quarterly basis by a feminist publishing house, Tartaruga, in Milan from March 1993. Later the frequency of the magazine was switched to monthly.

Lea Melandri was also the director of Lapis from its start to its closing in 1996. Its notable contributors included Giuliana Bruno, Giovanna Grignaffini, Paola Melchiori, Adriana Monti, Maria Nadotti and Patrizia Violi.

Lapis covered a wide variety of topics from women in workforce to their contributions to cultural development. The magazine had a regular section on cinema. Its last issue appeared in December 1996. The magazine produced 32 issues during its run.
