= Giuliana Bruno =

Italian American visual art and media scholar

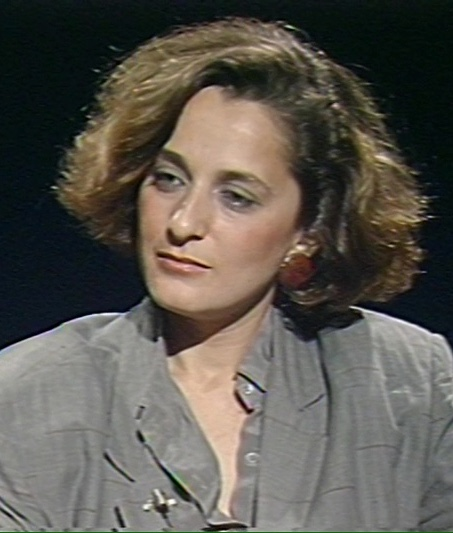
Bruno on CUNY TV's Cinema Then, Cinema Now (1986)

Giuliana Bruno is a scholar of visual art and media. She is currently the Emmet Blakeney Gleason Professor of Visual and Environmental Studies at Harvard University. She is internationally known as the author of numerous influential books and articles on art, architecture, film, and visual culture.

== Academic and Professional Career ==
Bruno first arrived in the United States from her native city of Naples in 1980 as a recipient of a Fulbright Fellowship as part of the Cultural Exchange Program between Italy and the United States. In 1990, she completed her PhD thesis Streetwalking on a Ruined Map: City Films of Elvira Notari (Italy: 1875-1946) at NYU, under the supervision of art critic and film scholar Annette Michelson. She served as assistant professor at Bard College from 1988 to 1990. Professor Bruno then joined Harvard's Visual and Environmental Studies Department in 1990, became a full professor in 1998, and assumed her endowed chair as Emmet Blakeney Gleason Professor in 2014. Professor Bruno also has an active role at the Harvard Graduate School of Design, serving on the doctoral degree committee in Architecture, Landscape Architecture, and Urban Planning and is an Affiliated Faculty member in the Masters in Art, Design, and the Public Domain program.

Professor Bruno is a Founding Member and former member of the Governing Board of the International Association for Visual Culture. She has served on the Editorial or Advisory Boards for a number of American and international journals and publishing houses, including: Screen (former editor), Lapis, and presently at the Journal of Visual Culture, Estetica, Vesper, Venti Journal, Mimesis publishing house and others. A Senior Researcher at metaLAB in the Berkman Klein Center for Internet and Society at Harvard University since 2011, she has served as a member of the editorial board for its metaLAB Projects book series.

In addition to her scholarly work, Bruno is active as a cultural critic in print and media, and as a public intellectual. She also often collaborates with artists and art institutions, and has written extensively in exhibition catalogues published by, among others, the Solomon R. Guggenheim Museum, the Museum of Modern Art, the Museo Reina Sofia, the Venice Biennale, and the Whitney Museum.

In 2017, along with nine other international artist-scholars, Bruno participated as a curator in the “Carta Bianca: Capodimonte Imaginaire," an art exhibition at the Museo e Real Bosco di Capodimonte in Naples that was based on the curators’ personal and creative interpretations of the museum's internal holdings.

Bruno's work has been translated into a dozen languages, and has been influential in various creative circles, in and beyond academia. Her books have inspired the Map of Tenderness couture collection that Alessandro Michele designed for GUCCI, an award-winning couture collection of the designer Marios Schwab, and the creation of Aria Magazine based on her theory of affective mapping. Her writings have also inspired Michael Nyman's music scores for urban silent films, and the work of numerous artists, including Renée Green’s Some Chance Operations (1999); Constanze Ruhm’s X Characters / RE(hers)AL (2003-4); Jesper Just’s trilogy A Room of One’s Own, A Voyage in Dwelling, A Question of Silence (2008); Roberto Paci Dalò’s Atlas of Emotion Stream (2009); Charles LaBelle’s Public Intimacy (2010-11); Rachel Rose’s Palisades in Palisades (2014); and Carola Spadoni's "Archiving the Peripatetic Film and Video Collection" (2021-).

== Major works and conceptual themes ==
=== Early works ===
Bruno’s first book, Off Screen: Women and Film in Italy (Routledge, 1988), and her second book, Immagini allo schermo (Rosenberg & Sellier, 1991), two essay collections co-authored and edited with Maria Nadotti, established critical connections between Anglo-American and Italian feminist film theories, promoting a dialogue that enriched their different perspectives.

=== Streetwalking on a Ruined Map ===
Bruno’s third book, Streetwalking on a Ruined Map: Cultural Theory and the City Films of Elvira Notari (Princeton University Press, 1993), elaborated on this theoretical basis with an interdisciplinary study of early Italian cinema and urban visual culture as projected in the work of prolific filmmaker Elvira Notari (1875-1946). Combining extensive archival research with theoretical inventiveness, Streetwalking forged a feminist media history that superseded the modalities of textual analysis and authorial monograph, more common at the time. Confronted with a landscape of suppressed knowledges, Bruno created a cultural archaeology, working on the margins, with a processual method that emphasized the gaps and the unfinished. A series of “inferential walks” through literature, photography, art history, urban studies, and the history of medicine as well as film history widened the horizon of feminist and media studies. This intellectual tapestry introduced transdisciplinary methodologies and topics that Bruno would continue to revisit throughout her work, in particular a “kinetic analytic” emphasizing cultural mobility. In this early work, her embodied and mobilized approach to space and spectatorship takes the form of a female psychogeography oriented around a flâneuse traversing sites of modernity such as cinemas, arcades, and trains.

=== Atlas of Emotion ===
Bruno's fourth book, Atlas of Emotion: Journeys in Art, Architecture, and Film (Verso, 2002), was a pioneering work of visual studies, advancing an interwoven theorization of art, architecture, film, and philosophy within a personal framework. Conceived as a scholarly travelogue, the book has been widely recognized for its poetic wordplay and conceptual intersections, for instance, in the blurred meanings of optic and haptic, motion and “e-motion,” sight and “site.” Drawing widely from varied methodologies and philosophies, and creating its own, the book inventively links concepts from classical film theory, art history, architectural modernism, cultural geography and cartographic thinking, phenomenologies of embodiment and haptic experience, and affect theory as well as feminist thought. Close analyses of urban visual practices and modernist media spaces constitute the book's nonlinear structure, including sections on the arcades, phantasmagoria, pre-cinematic viewing devices, cabinets of curiosity, memory theaters, movie palaces, the “theatrical” anatomy table, urban panoramas, site-seeing voyages, and the city symphony. In a 2018 review of the book, media theorist Jussi Parikka reflects on how the book's combinatory, media-genealogical approach in 2002 prefigured “some of the infrastructures of theory and method of contemporary contexts,” including the field of media archaeology.

=== Public Intimacy ===
Bruno's fifth book, Public Intimacy: Architecture and the Visual Arts (MIT Press, 2007), was an essay collection published as part of the Anyone Corporation's Writing Architecture series. It continues Bruno's engagement with the form and figure of the architectural promenade through writings on the material textures of cinema, fashion, the museum, and everyday life. With studies of the relation between cinema and the museum, the art of Jane and Louise Wilson, Rebecca Horn, Rachel Whiteread and Mona Hatoum, and the films of Andy Warhol and Tsai Ming-Liang, the book reconsiders medium-specific histories of artistic development through its notion of “public intimacy.” Bruno conceives of this intimacy as the “tangible, ‘superficial’ contact” through which “we apprehend the art object and the space of art.”

=== Surface ===
Bruno's sixth book, Surface: Matters of Aesthetics, Materiality and Media (University of Chicago Press, 2014) offers a dynamic and densely philosophical archaeology of surface. Surface charts a textured and materialist course through screen history and contemporary exhibition practice as a response both to the historical devaluation of the superficial and ornamental as well as to contemporary claims that technological transformations produce increasing dematerialization. The book interweaves poetic reflections on screens, stains, skins, dust, films, canvases, fabrics, façades, and volumetric installations of light with theoretical engagements with Deleuzian folds, Einfühlung and empathetic projection, and experiential and materialist philosophies to argue for a new materialism based on an expanded field of surface contact. Readings of artists include Anni Albers, Matthew Buckingham, Tacita Dean, Tara Donovan, Olafur Eliasson, Isaac Julien, Anthony McCall, Sarah Oppenheimer, Gerhard Richter, Do Ho Suh, Doris Salcedo, Lorna Simpson, James Turell, and Krzyztof Wodiczko.

=== Atmospheres of Projection ===
Bruno's seventh book, Atmospheres of Projection: Environmentality in Art and Screen Media is forthcoming from University of Chicago Press. Tracing the histories of projection and atmosphere in visual culture, this book reveals their relevance to contemporary artistic practices that engage environmentality. Moving across the fields of psychoanalysis, history of science, architecture, and environmental studies as well as visual art and moving-image culture throughout time, Bruno performs an excavation into the expansive history of projection and atmosphere, theorizing them as mediums and milieus, intermedial sensory processes, transitional and relational sites. A series of case studies of contemporary artists and architects, ranging from Robert Irwin to Peter Zumthor, Chantal Akerman to Diana Thater, Cristina Iglesias to Rosa Barba, then shows how today's projective media constitute environments, modifying our capacity to sense variable elemental conditions. Conceptually addressing “the projective imagination” with a form of “atmospheric thinking,” this book reveals how atmosphere is formed and mediated, how it can change, and what projection can do to modify a site. Ultimately, it demonstrates why we need these sites of the transmission of energies and intermixing between human and nonhuman entities. In this way, Bruno's notion of “environmentality” —an ecology of interrelationality—produces new sites of contact and vital exchange.

== Awards ==
Bruno's books have won numerous awards and recognitions. Streetwalking on a Ruined Map: Cultural Theory and the City Films of Elvira Notari was cited as best book in film studies in 1995, winning the Society for Cinema and Media Studies’ Katherine Singer Kovács Book Award and Italy’s Premio Filmcritica-Umberto Barbaro. Atlas of Emotion won the 2003 Kraszna-Krausz Moving Image Book Award, a prize awarded to "the world's best book on the moving image,” and was also recognized as an Outstanding Academic Title by the American Library Association, and named a Book of the Year in 2003 by The Guardian.

She is the recipient of a Fulbright Fellowship, the Jay Leyda Award for Academic Achievement, and a Ph.D. honoris causa awarded by the Institute for Doctoral Studies in the Visual Arts. In 2019, she was the Louis Kahn Scholar in Residence in the History of Art at the American Academy in Rome.

== Selected bibliography ==
=== Books ===
- Off Screen: Women and Film in Italy, with Maria Nadotti (Routledge, 1988) ISBN 9781138994584
- Immagini allo schermo (Rosenberg & Sellier, 1991) ISBN 9788870114485
- Streetwalking on a Ruined Map: Cultural Theory and the City Films of Elvira Notari (Princeton University Press, 1993) ISBN 9780691086286
- Atlas of Emotion: Journeys in Art, Architecture, and Film (Verso, 2002) ISBN 9781786633224
- Public Intimacy: Architecture and the Visual Arts (MIT Press, 2007) ISBN 9780262524650
- Surface: Matters of Aesthetics, Materiality, and Media (University of Chicago Press, 2014) ISBN 9780226104942
- Atmospheres of Projection: Environmentality in Art and Screen Media (University of Chicago Press, forthcoming 2022)

=== Selected articles ===
- "Ramble City: Postmodernism and Blade Runner," October, no. 41, Summer 1987.
- "Streetwalking around Plato's Cave", October, no. 60, Spring 1992.
- "Bodily Architectures," Assemblage, no. 19, December 1992.
- "Site-seeing: Architecture and the Moving Image," Wide Angle, special issue “Cityscapes I,” eds. Clark Arnwine and Jesse Lerner, vol. 19, no. 4, October 1997.
- “Pleats of Matter, Folds of the Soul,” LOG: Observations on Architecture and the Contemporary City, no. 1, Fall 2003.
- “Havana: Memoirs of Material Culture,” Journal of Visual Culture, vol. 2, no. 3, Dec. 2003.
- “Film, Aesthetics, Science: Hugo Münsterberg’s Laboratory of Moving Images,” Grey Room, no. 36, Summer 2009.
- “Surface Encounters,” e-flux journal, special issue Supercommunity, no. 65, May-Aug. 2015.
- “Projection: On Chantal Akerman’s Screens, from Cinema to the Art Gallery,” Senses of Cinema, Dec. 2015.
- “A Questionnaire on Materialisms,” October no. 155, 2016.
