= Philip Zaleski =

Philip Zaleski is the author and editor of several books on religion and spirituality, including The Recollected Heart, The Benedictines of Petersham, and Gifts of the Spirit. In addition, he is coauthor with his wife Carol Zaleski of The Book of Heaven, Prayer: A History, and The Fellowship: The Literary Lives of The Inklings J. R. R. Tolkien, C. S. Lewis, Owen Barfield, Charles Williams.

His books have received laudatory reviews in The New York Times Book Review, Time Magazine, The Los Angeles Times, The Boston Globe, and The Washington Post. Zaleski is also the editor of the acclaimed Best Spiritual Writing series (1998–present). His essays and reviews on religion, culture, and the arts appear regularly in national periodicals including The New York Times, The Washington Post, The Boston Globe, and First Things. Zaleski was for many years a book critic for the Boston Phoenix, and later worked as executive editor and senior editor at Parabola Magazine, where he contributed frequent essays on Christianity and other world religions. During this period he also published a pioneering essay on Vladimir Nabokov's lepidoptery, which won him the David McCord Essay Prize. In 1999, Zaleski compiled, under the auspices of HarperCollins Publishers, a list of the 100 Best Spiritual Books of the 20th Century.

Zaleski has taught religion, literature, film, and creative writing at Wesleyan University, Smith College, and Tufts University.

One of Zaleski's main subjects is prayer, which he has described in a television interview as "communication between the human and transcendent realms, an act that for most people means talking with a personal God, coming into the presence of a Person who cares about them and loves them and can offer them help. This communication may in time become a two-way street, as God responds. Vast numbers of people report this sort of experience and make it the basis of their daily lives, people who wake up every morning, pray, and believe that they have been in communion with God. They pray to God and receive an answer. And this relationship makes people profoundly happy, which tells us that prayer is something essential to our nature, as if it were hardwired in us."

He is the son of Malta-born artist Jean Zaleski.
