= Elvira Notari =

Italian film director

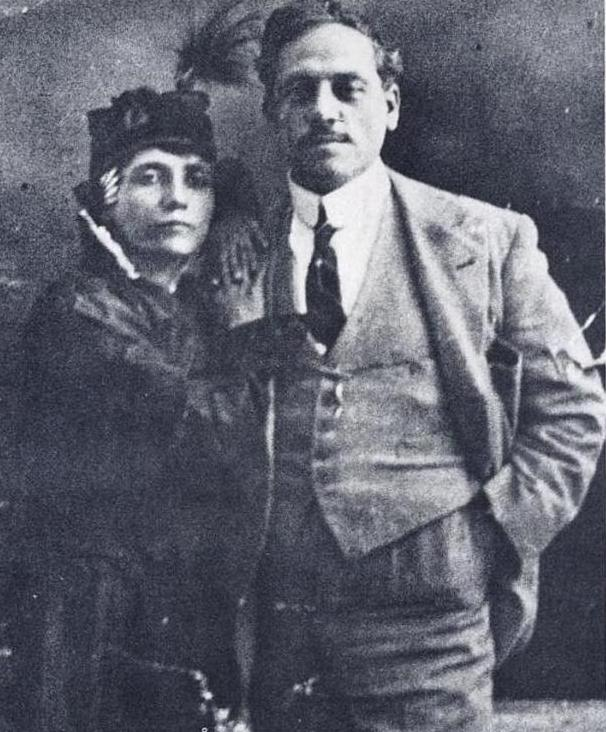
- Elvira and Nicola Notari
- Born: Elvira Coda; 10 February 1875; Salerno, Italy
- Died: 17 December 1946 (aged 71); Cava de' Tirreni, Italy
- Occupation: filmmaker

Elvira Notari (born Elvira Coda; 10 February 1875 – 17 December 1946) was an Italian film director, one of the country's early and more prolific female filmmakers. She is credited with making over 60 feature films and about 100 shorts and documentaries, quite often writing the subjects and screenplays, inspired by Naples. The Elvira Notari Prize is named after her.

She was of modest social origins. She married Nicola Notari. Together they founded Dora Film, and she became the first Italian woman to create a family film production company. She directed the films, while he worked as a cameraman. Their son, Eduardo or "Gennariello", based on a character he played, worked as an actor in many of the films. Eduardo nicknamed his mother "The General", based on her strong will and determination displayed in her film company. In an example, tears on screen for her films had to be real, brought up from a "painful or emotionally sensitive detail of a player's private life", rather than the use of glycerin for artificial tears.

== Early life ==
She was born to Diego Coda and Agnese Vignes. Elvira was uncommonly allowed to attend school and pursue an education at the School of Science in literature while dancing as a hobby. In school, she developed her skills in the use of language and this was shown in her writing. In 1902, when she finished school she and her family moved to Naples. She worked as a "milliner" which she continued to do even after she became a filmmaker. Where after some time she found and in August 1902, married Nicola Notari. They had three children, Eduardo, Dora and Maria.

== Career ==
Elvira along with her husband established their production company. After a few name changes they settled on Dora Films, which was named after her daughter, who never worked in the business. Notari's company stood out with their hand-colored film titles called Cinecittà, which were used to preview events and attractions. It was not until 1912 that the Dora Film company built a stage set, or teatro di posa¸ and became a full-fledged production house. Her husband worked the camera while Elvira directed and wrote the films. She is credited as the first woman film director. Most of the work done by Dora films was lost, with only a few records remaining. Dora Films was a true production company, which included editing, labs and other necessities to create films. The live synchronization of music and songs with the images on screen, often hand-drawn or machine colored, are quite possibly the first form of multimedia entertainment ever.

By the 1920s, the Notari's films had to be distributed throughout the American market as they were denied national circulation in Italy, despite being one of, if not the most, successful and important production company of Italian Cinema for the times. Dora Films eventually formed an office in New York, fittingly enough in Little Italy; the films made brought Italian immigrants together and gave education to ideas of Italy for those unaware.

Dora films also had an acting school of cinematic art. At Dora Films, Elvira produced documentaries and short films. According to a testimony by her son, Elvira was one to demand a real and true performance from her actors. The films produced at Dora films were done through a female gaze as well as dealing with natural life in Italy. Elvira would remind her actors about sad moments in her life. This was "reminiscent of neorealism". Elvira is credited with contributing to the acting school as well as being a scriptwriter. It is understood that she might have also worked on the editing of the films they produced.

Elvira Notari relied on women's literature when it came to the development of her ideas. In her "female melodramas" she focuses on the female perspective. Elvira had a tendency of portraying the "dark woman", the femme fatale, a woman who deviated from the norm. There was a focus on the female body as well as female fantasy, which is an aspect of Elvira Natori's work. In her works 'Nfama! and A Piedigrotta the female leads are described as the "unruly female figure"[6] the films go on to portray the struggle of these women. One of the other themes in her films, that present these types of women, is desire. Men desiring women, women desiring some sort of feeling or emotion.

Censorship in Italy had come down on Dora films. The films shined a light on aspects of Italian life that many found unsuitable to be portrayed. The films often dealt with “crude language and sexual undertones,” which tested the idea of censorship. Censorship often asked for scenes to be edited or removed. Furthermore, Notari’s decline came through Fascist intervention in her own home and she inevitable shifted to Hollywood-style film, including soundtrack over her original live singers signature, with her film Napoli terra d’amore (1928) being a disaster with her public. A slight revival with her film, Trionfo cristiano (1930) (though the release date is controversial), Notari shifted once again to religious themes, again controversially due to desire for its identity change or potentially just the popularity of the style.

Moreover and more recently, Notari’s film, A Santanotte (1922), was restored between 2007-2008, piecing together titles explaining the censorship of a multitude of depictions within the film ranging from physical violence to drinking and more. These depictions gave Notari a difficult time with United States censorships as well, though she found success in the United States verified through ads.

== Style and themes ==
The feature films made by Notari were often based on Neapolitan (especially middle-class women) forms of drama. Notari shifted to the sceneggiata, a hybrid theatrical form drawing on popular dramatic songs and the variety stage, by the early 1920s, and shot on the streets of Naples using non-professional actors. The amateur actors gave realistic vibes to her films, while each of Notari's scenes utilized the street as a natural stage filled with lights, crowds, and their voices alike, rather than shot in a Cinecittà. Notari defined her passionate dramas as part of a series defined by her as grandi lavori popolari ("great popular works"). The Notari's realist touch has been linked to the later neorealist movement. Elvira Notari's work presented a lot of windows representing several aspect, as well as the city being of extreme importance, especially due to her style of location shooting. Further, the city and windows expand on Notari's public and private stories, with nodes to men being part of the public space while the women the domestic space. Though Notari often featured women in the public space, they were often surrounded by men.

== Later life ==
At the end of Dora films in 1930, Elvira and her husband moved on in the film industry through the 1930s. Due to the incoming of sound in films and the rise of censorship, Dora films ended. Though lack of desire and sound may not be the reason she truly retired, but solely on the censorship front. Furthermore, it may also be due to the fact that it was must for Italian filmmakers to move to Rome due to the governments choices and Elvira had no desire to. Elvira moved to Cava de ‘Tirreni, near Salerno, where she retired and eventually passed on 17 December 1946. The Notari’s started a photography equipment store. Later on her husband became a film distributor.

== Filmography ==
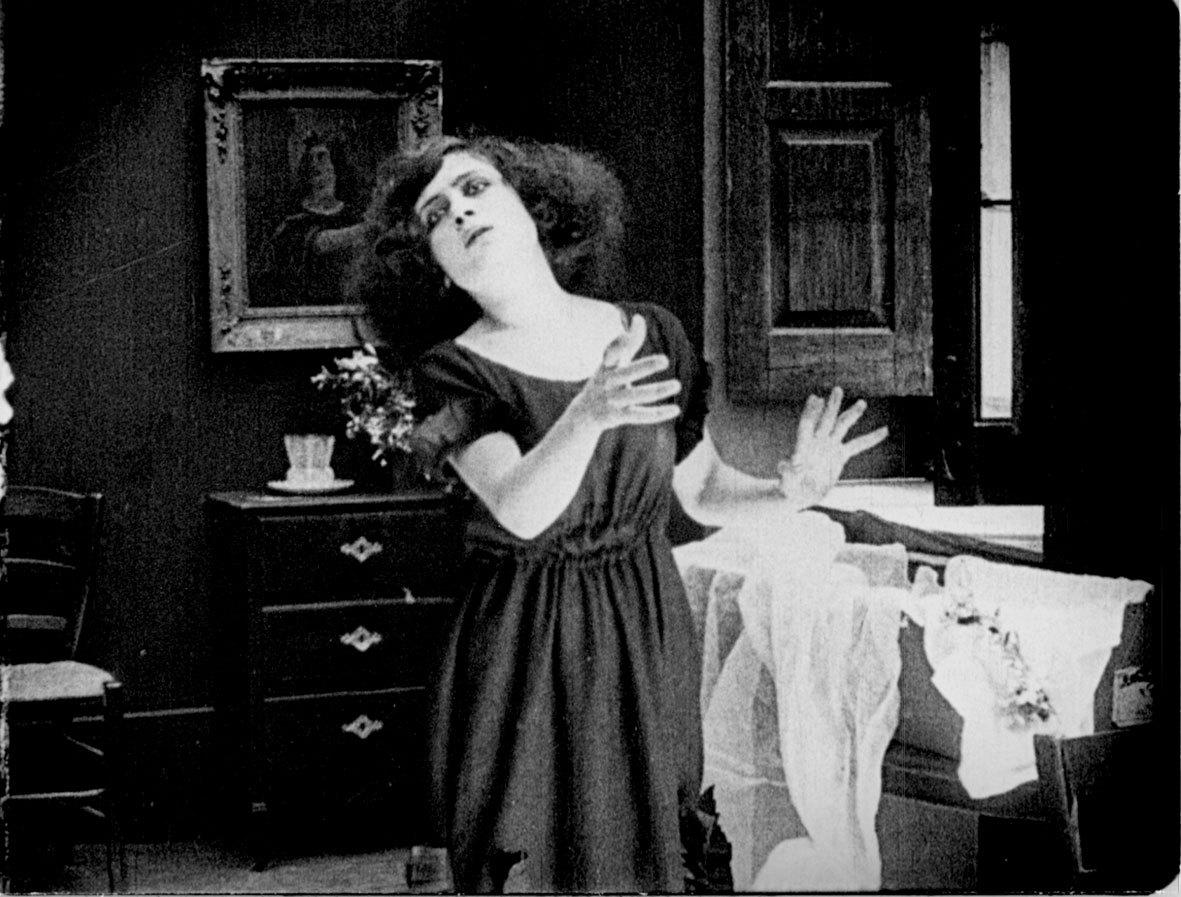
Rosè Angione as Nanninella in 'A Santanotte, 1922

Year	Title	Contribution	Notes
1911	Maria Rosa di Santa Flavia	Director, actress	Short
1911	Carmela la pazza	Director	Short
1911	Bufera d'anime	Director, actress	Short
1912	La figlia del Vesuvio	Director	Short
1912	Eroismo di un aviatore militare a Tripoli	Director, actress	
1913	Povera Tisa, povera madre!	Director, actress	Short
1913	I nomadi	Director	Short
1913	Il tricolore	Director, actress	Short
1914	Ritorna all'onda	Director, actress & writer	Short
1914	La fuga del gatto	Director	Short
1915	Sempre avanti, Savoia!	Director	
1916	Gloria ai caduti	Director	
1916	Carmela, la sartina di Montesanto	Director	
1916	Ciccio, il pizzaiuolo del Carmine	Director	
1917	Il nano rosso	Director	
1917	Mandolinata a mare	Director	
1917	La maschera del vizio	Director, actress	
1917	'E Scugnizze	Director	
1918	Il barcaiuolo d'Amalfi	Director	
1918	Pusilleco addiruso	Director	Short
1918	Gnesella	Director	
1919	Chiarina la modista	Director	
1919	Gabriele, il lampionaro di porto	Director	
1919	Medea di Portamedina	Director	
1920	A Piedigotta	Director, writer	Short
1920	'A Legge	Director	
1921	'O munaciello	Director	
1921	Gennariello polizziotto	Director	
1921	Luciella	Director	
1921	Gennariello, il figlio del galeotto	Director	Short
1922	Il miracolo della Madonna di Pompei	Director	
1922	'A Santanotte	Director	Extant
1922	E'Piccerella	Director, writer	Short, extant
1923	Sotto San Francisco	Director	Short
1923	'O cuppè d'a morte	Director	
1924	Brother's Heart	Director	
1924	A Marechiare 'nce sta 'na fenestra	Director	
1924	'Nfama	Director	
1925	Mettete l'avocato	Director	
1927	Fantasia 'e surdate	Director, actress, editor & producer	Short
1927	L'Italia s'è desta	Director	
1928	Napoli Terra d'Amore	Director	
1928	Duie Paravise	Director	
1929	Napoli sirena della canzone	Director	

== Sources ==
- Bruno, Giuliana (1993). Streetwalking On A Ruined Map: Cultural Theory and the City Films of Elvira Notari. Princeton University Press. ISBN 978-0691086286.
- Bruno, Giuliana (February 1993). "Elvira Coda Notari und der neapolitanische Film: ein historisches Panorama". Frauen und Film (56–57).
- Foster, Gwendolyn Audrey (1995). Women film directors: an international bio-critical dictionary. Greenwood Publishing Group. ISBN 0-313-28972-7.
- Scalia, Rossella (2013). "Elvira Notari: A Woman in Search of Desire". Film International.
- Tomadjogiou, Kimberly (1922). "I film-sceneggiata". Bianco e Nero. LXXII (570).
