= Geschichte und Region/Storia e regione =

Geschichte und Region Storia e regione
- Language: German; Italian
- Edited by: Brunet Francesca

Publication details
- Publisher: Arbeitsgruppe Geschichte und Region/Storia e regione (Austria)
- Frequency: Biannual

Standard abbreviations
- ISO 4: Gesch. Reg. Stor. reg.

Indexing
- ISSN: 1121-0303
- OCLC no.: 1323243408

Links
- Journal homepage

Geschichte und Region/Storia e regione (GR/SR) is an Italian academic journal established in 1992 by the Arbeitsgruppe Geschichte und Region/Storia e regione, based in Bolzano, South Tyrol. It is a German-Italian bilingual and peer-reviewed publication.
